= List of Canadian Football League annual receiving leaders =

The Canadian Football League (CFL) was officially formed in 1958. Statistics for the IRFU/Eastern Division date back to 1954 whereas WIFU/Western Division statistics date back to 1950.

CFL annual receiving leaders
Season	Receiving yards	Receptions	Touchdown receptions
1950	1,060 Morris Bailey	67 Morris Bailey	4 Morris Bailey
1951	1,024 Neill Armstrong	61 Bob Shaw	10 Neill Armstrong
1952	1,094 Bob Shaw	65 Paul Salata	11 Paul Salata
1953	1,164 'Red' O'Quinn	68 Bud Grant	8 'Red' O'Quinn
1954	1,142 Al Pfeifer	68 Al Pfeifer	8 Ray Ramsey
1955	1,342 Al Pfeifer	78 Red O'Quinn	15 Al Pfeifer
1956	1,914 Hal Patterson	88 Hal Patterson	12 Hal Patterson
1957	1,006 Red O'Quinn	61 Red O'Quinn	7 Hal Patterson, Bob Simpson & Pete O'Garro
1958	1,065 Jack Hill	60 Jack Hill	16 Jack Hill
1959	1,126 Ernie Pitts	68 Ernie Pitts	16 Ernie Pitts
1960	1,380 Dave Mann	61 Dave Mann	13 Dave Mann
1961	892 Dave Mann	53 Dave Mann	8 Farrell Funston
1962	951 Tommy Joe Coffey	65 Tommy Joe Coffey	10 Garney Henley
1963	1,104 Tommy Joe Coffey	74 Bobby Taylor	10 Dick Shatto
1964	1,142 Tommy Joe Coffey	81 Tommy Joe Coffey	11 Hugh Campbell
1965	1,329 Hugh Campbell	81 Tommy Joe Coffey	10 Hugh Campbell
1966	1,266 Terry Evanshen	67 Terry Evanshen	17 Hugh Campbell
1967	1,662 Terry Evanshen	96 Terry Evanshen	17 Terry Evanshen
1968	1,306 Herm Harrison	68 Ken Nielsen	13 Whit Tucker
1969	1,402 Margene Adkins	71 Tommy Joe Coffey	11 Tommy Joe Coffey & Hugh Campbell
1970	1,043 Hugh Oldham	70 Herm Harrison	13 Hugh Oldham
1971	1,436 Jim Thorpe	70 Herm Harrison	9 Jim Thorpe
1972	1,362 Jim Young	70 Jim Thorpe	12 Gerry Shaw
1973	1,123 George McGowan	81 George McGowan	9 George McGowan
1974	1,024 Johnny Rodgers	64 Rudy Linterman	8 Peter Dalla Riva
1975	1,472 George McGowan	98 George McGowan	13 Terry Evanshen
1976	1,320 Tony Gabriel	72 Tony Gabriel	14 Tony Gabriel
1977	1,362 Tony Gabriel	68 Molly McGee	10 Tom Scott
1978	1,091 Tom Scott	75 Joe Poplawski	11 Tony Gabriel
1979	1,214 Waddell Smith	74 Waddell Smith	13 Waddell Smith
1980	1,245 Tom Scott	79 Mike Holmes	13 Tom Scott
1981	1,715 Joey Walters	100 Eugene Goodlow	14 Joey Walters & Eugene Goodlow
1982	1,692 Joey Walters	102 Joey Walters	13 Tom Scott
1983	2,003 Terry Greer	113 Terry Greer	11 Brian Kelly & Emanuel Tolbert
1984	1,486 Mervyn Fernandez	91 Craig Ellis	18 Brian Kelly
1985	1,727 Mervyn Fernandez	102 Craig Ellis	15 Mervyn Fernandez
1986	1,746 James Murphy	116 James Murphy	12 James Murphy
1987	1,628 Brian Kelly	94 Marc Lewis	13 Brian Kelly
1988	1,468 David Williams	83 David Williams	18 David Williams
1989	1,656 Tony Champion	95 Tony Champion	15 Tony Champion
1990	1,826 Darrell Smith	106 Craig Ellis	20 Darrell Smith
1991	1,764 Allen Pitts	118 Allen Pitts	15 Allen Pitts
1992	1,591 Allen Pitts	103 Allen Pitts	15 Jim Sandusky
1993	1,484 Dave Sapunjis	103 Dave Sapunjis	15 Dave Sapunjis, Eddie Brown & David Williams
1994	2,036 Allen Pitts	126 Allen Pitts	21 Allen Pitts
1995	1,655 Dave Sapunjis	123 Don Narcisse	13 Earl Winfield
1996	1,426 Mac Cody	116 Mike Clemons	11 Allen Pitts & Mac Cody
1997	1,616 Milt Stegall	122 Mike Clemons	17 Derrell Mitchell
1998	2,000 Derrell Mitchell	160 Derrell Mitchell	11 Allen Pitts
1999	1,449 Allen Pitts	97 Allen Pitts	11 Terry Vaughn
2000	1,560 Curtis Marsh Sr.	102 Curtis Marsh	15 Milt Stegall & Travis Moore
2001	1,497 Terry Vaughn	98 Terry Vaughn	14 Milt Stegall
2002	1,896 Milt Stegall	106 Milt Stegall	23 Milt Stegall
2003	1,757 Jeremaine Copeland	112 Ben Cahoon	15 Milt Stegall
2004	1,750 Geroy Simon	103 Geroy Simon	14 Geroy Simon
2005	1,411 Jason Tucker	97 Kerry Watkins	17 Milt Stegall
2006	1,856 Geroy Simon	105 Geroy Simon	15 Geroy Simon
2007	1,293 Geroy Simon	89 Ben Cahoon	10 Jeremaine Copeland, Ken-Yon Rambo & D. J. Flick
2008	1,473 Ken-Yon Rambo	107 Ben Cahoon	16 Jamel Richardson
2009	1,402 Fred Stamps	89 Ben Cahoon	12 Jeremaine Copeland
2010	1,380 Andy Fantuz	97 Jamel Richardson	15 Romby Bryant
2011	1,777 Jamel Richardson	112 Jamel Richardson	11 Jamel Richardson
2012	1,328 Chad Owens	100 Nik Lewis	13 Weston Dressler
2013	1,359 Fred Stamps	94 Chad Owens	13 S. J. Green
2014	1,456 Adarius Bowman	112 Adarius Bowman	8 Emmanuel Arceneaux
2015	1,448 Eric Rogers	93 Adarius Bowman	10 Eric Rogers
2016	1,761 Adarius Bowman	120 Adarius Bowman	13 Emmanuel Arceneaux
2017	1,687 Brandon Zylstra	105 Andrew Harris	12 Greg Ellingson
2018	1,579 Duke Williams	116 Brad Sinopoli	11 Brandon Banks, Duke Williams, & Luke Tasker
2019	1,550 Brandon Banks	112 Brandon Banks	13 Brandon Banks
2021	1,014 Kenny Lawler	67 Bryan Burnham	11 Jake Wieneke
2022	1,441 Dalton Schoen	94 Tim White	16 Dalton Schoen
2023	1,269 Tim White	93 Shawn Bane	10 Dalton Schoen
2024	1,469 Justin McInnis	97 Justin Hardy	10 Eugene Lewis
2025	1,688 Keon Hatcher	102 Keon Hatcher, Kevin Mital	14 Kenny Lawler
2026	1,809 Tyson Philpot	124 Tyson Philpot	13 Tyson Philpot, Tyler Snead

== See also ==
- List of Canadian Football League annual passing leaders
- List of Canadian Football League annual rushing leaders
