= Bobby Taylor (Canadian football) =

Canadian Football League receiver (1939–2023)

Profile
- Position: Wide receiver

Personal information
- Born: March 5, 1939; Barrow-in-Furness, England
- Died: August 20, 2023 (aged 84); Toronto, Ontario, Canada
- Listed height: 5 ft 10 in (1.78 m)
- Listed weight: 185 lb (84 kg)

Career history
- 1961–1965: Calgary Stampeders
- 1966–1970: Toronto Argonauts
- 1971: Hamilton Tiger-Cats
- 1971–1973: Edmonton Eskimos
- 1974: Toronto Argonauts

Awards and highlights
- CFL East All-Star (1969)

Robert Taylor (March 5, 1939 – August 20, 2023) was a Canadian Football League receiver who played for the Calgary Stampeders, Toronto Argonauts, Hamilton Tiger-Cats, and Edmonton Eskimos. He attended Clarkson University from 1961 to 1962.

In his fourteen-year career Taylor caught 521 receptions for a total of 8,203 yards and 50 touchdowns. His 56 catches led the CFL in 1968.

He was Toronto's nominee for Most Outstanding Canadian player in 1968 and 1969.

Taylor played minor league hockey, as well, from 1962 to 1970 in the EHL, WHL, AHL, and CPHL.

From 1975 until his death in 2023, he owned the Black Bull Tavern, a popular bar on Toronto's Queen Street West. In 2024, Janine Bartels, Taylor's granddaughter, announced that the tavern would close permanently on April 3, 2024 after nearly 200 years in business; it opened in 1833.

He died from cancer at his home in Toronto, on August 20, 2023, at the age of 84.
