= Ed Joyner =

American gridiron football player

Profile
- Positions: Linebacker, Guard

Personal information
- Born: c. 1945 (age 80–81)
- Listed height: 6 ft 1 in (1.85 m)
- Listed weight: 230 lb (104 kg)

Career information
- College: Lenoir–Rhyne

Career history
- 1968–1970: Ottawa Rough Riders

Awards and highlights
- Grey Cup champion (1968, 1969)

Ed Joyner (born c. 1945) was a Canadian football player who played for the Ottawa Rough Riders. He won the Grey Cup in 1968 and 1969. He previously played college football at Lenoir–Rhyne University.
