= 1968 CFL season =

Canadian Football League season

- East champions: Ottawa Rough Riders
- West champions: Calgary Stampeders

56th Grey Cup
- Champions: Ottawa Rough Riders

CFL seasons
- 1967 1969

Canadian Football League team locations: West, East

The 1968 CFL season is considered to be the 15th season in modern-day Canadian football, although it is officially the 11th Canadian Football League season.

== CFL news in 1968 ==
J.G. (Jake) Gaudaur was appointed CFL Commissioner and the league adopted a new constitution. Gaudaur would serve in that position until 1984; he is the league's longest-tenured commissioner.

Hamilton Tiger-Cats wide receiver Ted Watkins was shot and killed while allegedly robbing a liquor store in California, shortly before the start of the CFL season.

== Regular season standings ==
West Division
Pos	Team	Pld	W	L	T	PF	PA	PD	Pts
1	Saskatchewan Roughriders (C, Q)	16	12	3	1	345	223	+122	25
2	Calgary Stampeders (Q)	16	10	6	0	412	249	+163	20
3	Edmonton Eskimos (Q)	16	8	7	1	228	288	−60	17
4	BC Lions	16	4	11	1	217	318	−101	9
5	Winnipeg Blue Bombers	16	3	13	0	210	374	−164	6

(C) First round bye; (Q) Qualified for playoffs

East Division
Pos	Team	Pld	W	L	T	PF	PA	PD	Pts
1	Ottawa Rough Riders (C, Q)	14	9	3	2	416	271	+145	20
2	Toronto Argonauts (Q)	14	9	5	0	284	266	+18	18
3	Hamilton Tiger-Cats (Q)	14	6	7	1	262	292	−30	13
4	Montreal Alouettes	14	3	9	2	234	327	−93	8

(C) First round bye; (Q) Qualified for playoffs

Saskatchewan and Ottawa have first round byes.

== Grey Cup playoffs ==
Note: All dates in 1968

=== Conference Semi-Finals ===
Eastern Semi-Finals
Hamilton Tiger-Cats @ Toronto Argonauts
Date	Away	Home
November 9	Hamilton Tiger-Cats 21	Toronto Argonauts 33

Western Semi-Finals
Edmonton Eskimos @ Calgary Stampeders
Date	Away	Home
November 10	Edmonton Eskimos 13	Calgary Stampeders 29

=== Conference Finals ===
Western Finals
Calgary Stampeders vs Saskatchewan Roughriders
Game	Date	Away	Home
1	November 16	Calgary Stampeders 32	Saskatchewan Roughriders 0
2 (OT)	November 20	Saskatchewan Roughriders 12	Calgary Stampeders 25
Calgary wins the best of three series 2–0

Eastern Finals
Ottawa Rough Riders vs Toronto Argonauts
Game	Date	Away	Home
1	November 17	Ottawa Rough Riders 11	Toronto Argonauts 13
2	November 24	Toronto Argonauts 14	Ottawa Rough Riders 36
Ottawa won 2 game total-point series 47–27

== Playoff bracket ==
Division Semifinals
East
E2	Toronto Argonauts	33
E3	Hamilton Tiger-Cats	21
West
W2	Calgary Stampeders	29
W3	Edmonton Eskimos	13

Division Finals
E1	Ottawa Rough Riders	47 (11+36)
E2	Toronto Argonauts	27 (13+14)
W1	Saskatchewan Roughriders	0 (0,12)
W2	Calgary Stampeders	2 (32,25)

56th Grey Cup
E1	Ottawa Rough Riders	24
W2	Calgary Stampeders	21

== Grey Cup Championship ==
November 30 56th Annual Grey Cup Game: CNE Stadium – Toronto, Ontario
Western Champion	Eastern Champion
Calgary Stampeders 21	Ottawa Rough Riders 24
The Ottawa Rough Riders are the 1968 Grey Cup Champions
Vic Washington (RB), Ottawa Rough Riders – Grey Cup's Most Valuable Player.

== CFL leaders ==
- CFL passing leaders
- CFL rushing leaders
- CFL receiving leaders

== 1968 CFL All-Stars ==
=== Offence ===
- QB – Russ Jackson, Ottawa Rough Riders
- RB – George Reed, Saskatchewan Roughriders
- RB – Bill Symons, Toronto Argonauts
- RB – Vic Washington, Ottawa Rough Riders
- TE – Tommy Joe Coffey, Hamilton Tiger-Cats
- TE – Herman Harrison, Calgary Stampeders
- F – Ken Nielsen, Winnipeg Blue Bombers
- C – Ted Urness, Saskatchewan Roughriders
- OG – Charlie Parker, Montreal Alouettes
- OG – Bill Danychuk, Hamilton Tiger-Cats
- OT – Bill Frank, Toronto Argonauts
- OT – Clyde Brock, Saskatchewan Roughriders

=== Defence ===
- DT – Ed McQuarters, Saskatchewan Roughriders
- DT – John LaGrone, Edmonton Eskimos
- DE – Billy Ray Locklin, Hamilton Tiger-Cats
- DE – Ed Harrington, Toronto Argonauts
- LB – Wayne Harris, Calgary Stampeders
- LB – Wally Dempsey, Saskatchewan Roughriders
- LB – Ken Lehmann, Ottawa Rough Riders
- DB – Frank Andruski, Calgary Stampeders
- DB – Bob Kosid, Saskatchewan Roughriders
- DB – Garney Henley, Hamilton Tiger-Cats
- DB – Ed Learn, Toronto Argonauts
- DB – Marv Luster, Toronto Argonauts

== 1968 Eastern All-Stars ==
=== Offence ===
- QB – Russ Jackson, Ottawa Rough Riders
- RB – Bo Scott, Ottawa Rough Riders
- RB – Bill Symons, Toronto Argonauts
- RB – Vic Washington, Ottawa Rough Riders
- TE – Tommy Joe Coffey, Hamilton Tiger-Cats
- TE – Mel Profit, Toronto Argonauts
- F – Whit Tucker, Ottawa Rough Riders
- C – Basil Bark, Montreal Alouettes
- OG – Charlie Parker, Montreal Alouettes
- OG – Bill Danychuk, Hamilton Tiger-Cats
- OT – Bill Frank, Toronto Argonauts
- OT – Ellison Kelly, Hamilton Tiger-Cats

=== Defence ===
- DT – Mike Wadsworth, Toronto Argonauts
- DT – Marshall Shirk, Ottawa Rough Riders
- DE – Billy Ray Locklin, Hamilton Tiger-Cats
- DE – Ed Harrington, Toronto Argonauts
- LB – Jerry Campbell, Ottawa Rough Riders
- LB – Allen Ray Aldridge Sr., Toronto Argonauts
- LB – Ken Lehmann, Ottawa Rough Riders
- DB – Larry Fairholm, Montreal Alouettes
- DB – Don Sutherin, Ottawa Rough Riders
- DB – Garney Henley, Hamilton Tiger-Cats
- DB – Ed Learn, Toronto Argonauts
- DB – Marv Luster, Toronto Argonauts

== 1968 Western All-Stars ==
=== Offence ===
- QB – Ron Lancaster, Saskatchewan Roughriders
- RB – George Reed, Saskatchewan Roughriders
- RB – Dave Raimey, Winnipeg Blue Bombers
- RB – Jim Evenson, BC Lions
- SE – Terry Evanshen, Calgary Stampeders
- TE – Herman Harrison, Calgary Stampeders
- F – Ken Nielsen, Winnipeg Blue Bombers
- C – Ted Urness, Saskatchewan Roughriders
- OG – Bob Lueck, Calgary Stampeders
- OG – John Atamian, Saskatchewan Roughriders
- OT – Ken Sugarman, BC Lions
- OT – Clyde Brock, Saskatchewan Roughriders

=== Defence ===
- DT – Ed McQuarters, Saskatchewan Roughriders
- DT – John LaGrone, Edmonton Eskimos
- DE – Bill Whisler, Winnipeg Blue Bombers
- DE – Dick Suderman, Calgary Stampeders
- LB – Wayne Harris, Calgary Stampeders
- LB – Wally Dempsey, Saskatchewan Roughriders
- LB – Phil Minnick, Winnipeg Blue Bombers
- LB – Greg Findlay, BC Lions
- DB – Frank Andruski, Calgary Stampeders
- DB – Bob Kosid, Saskatchewan Roughriders
- DB – Jerry Keeling, Calgary Stampeders
- DB – Bruce Bennett, Saskatchewan Roughriders
- DB – Ernie Pitts, Winnipeg Blue Bombers

== 1968 CFL awards ==
- CFL's Most Outstanding Player Award – Bill Symons (RB), Toronto Argonauts
- CFL's Most Outstanding Canadian Award – Ken Nielsen (F), Winnipeg Blue Bombers
- CFL's Most Outstanding Lineman Award – Ken Lehmann (LB), Ottawa Rough Riders
- CFL's Coach of the Year – Eagle Keys, Saskatchewan Roughriders
- Jeff Russel Memorial Trophy (Eastern MVP) – Larry Fairholm (DB), Montreal Alouettes
- Jeff Nicklin Memorial Trophy (Western MVP) - Ron Lancaster (QB), Saskatchewan Roughriders
- Gruen Trophy (Eastern Rookie of the Year) - Dave Knechtel (DL), Toronto Argonauts
- Dr. Beattie Martin Trophy (Western Rookie of the Year) - Dave Cranmer (RB), Calgary Stampeders
- DeMarco–Becket Memorial Trophy (Western Outstanding Lineman) - Ed McQuarters (DT), Saskatchewan Roughriders
