= Jerry Campbell =

American gridiron football player (1944-2017)

No. 54
- Position: Linebacker

Personal information
- Born: July 14, 1944; Binghamton, New York, U.S.
- Died: August 9, 2017 (aged 73); Toronto, Ontario, Canada.
- Listed height: 5 ft 11 in (1.80 m)
- Listed weight: 210 lb (95 kg)

Career information
- High school: Spokane (WA) Lewis & Clark
- College: Idaho

Career history
- 1966–1968: Calgary Stampeders
- 1968–1975: Ottawa Rough Riders
- 1976: Calgary Stampeders

Awards and highlights
- 3× Grey Cup champion (1968, 1969, 1973); 7× CFL All-Star (1969–1975); 7× CFL East All-Star (1968, 1969, 1970, 1972–1975)
- Canadian Football Hall of Fame (Class of 1996)

Gerald "Soupy" Campbell (July 14, 1944 - August 9, 2017) was an American professional football player, a linebacker in the Canadian Football League for the Calgary Stampeders (1966–1968) and the Ottawa Rough Riders (1968–1975).

== Early life and college ==
Born in Binghamton, New York, Campbell played high school football for the Lewis and Clark Tigers in Spokane, Washington, and graduated in 1962. He then played college football at the University of Idaho in Moscow, about 100 miles (160 km) south, and was a three-year starter for the Vandals on defense under head coaches Dee Andros and Steve Musseau.

At Idaho, he was a roommate of future major league pitcher Bill Stoneman. Tired of spring football practice, Campbell tried out for the Vandal baseball team in 1965 on a whim and made the team as a back-up catcher and outfielder.

== Professional career ==
=== Calgary Stampeders (first stint) ===
Campbell started his CFL career with the Calgary Stampeders in 1966.

=== Ottawa Rough Riders ===
During his third year in the CFL, Campbell became a member of the Ottawa Rough Riders via a trade during the 1968 season. As an outside linebacker, he played next to middle linebacker Ken Lehmann up to 1971 and behind defensive end Billy Joe Booth up to 1970.

He was a savvy and quick linebacker, rarely blowing his assignment. As a result, Campbell was a CFL All-Star for seven straight years (1969–1975) for the Rough Riders and played a significant part on three Grey Cup championship teams for them, in 1968, 1969, and 1973.

=== Calgary Stampeders (second stint) ===
Campbell finished his CFL career where he started, in Calgary, but played only 2 games with the team in 1976.

=== Post-football honors ===
For his high level of play and consistency over many years, Campbell was inducted into the Canadian Football Hall of Fame in 1996.

== Death ==
Campbell died of a heart attack on August 9, 2017, in Toronto, aged 73. He also had Alzheimer's disease in his later years.
