= Wally Dempsey =

American gridiron football player (1944–2024)

Profile
- Position: Linebacker

Personal information
- Born: January 9, 1944; Melrose Park, Illinois, U.S.
- Died: December 3, 2024 (aged 80); California, U.S.
- Listed height: 6 ft 1 in (1.85 m)
- Listed weight: 235 lb (107 kg)

Career information
- High school: Cleveland (Los Angeles, California)
- College: Los Angeles Pierce JC (1961–1962); Washington State (1963–1964)

Career history
- 1965–1969: Saskatchewan Roughriders
- 1970: BC Lions
- 1971–1972: Saskatchewan Roughriders

Awards and highlights
- Grey Cup champion (1966)

William Theodore Dempsey (January 9, 1944 – December 3, 2024) was an American professional football player who played for the Saskatchewan Roughriders and BC Lions. He won the Grey Cup with Saskatchewan in 1966. He played college football at Washington State University. After his CFL career, Dempsey also had a brief career in the World Football League with the Memphis Southmen and Philadelphia Bell. After his retirement from football, he owned and operated a construction company in Sacramento, California.

He died on December 3, 2024 at the age of 80.
