= Cliff Shaw (Canadian football) =

Canadian football linebacker (1943–1993)

Profile
- Position: Linebacker

Personal information
- Born: August 30, 1943
- Died: June 15, 1993 (aged 49)
- Listed height: 6 ft 0 in (1.83 m)
- Listed weight: 221 lb (100 kg)

Career history
- 1966–1970: Saskatchewan Roughriders

Awards and highlights
- Grey Cup champion (1966)

Cliff Shaw (August 30, 1943 – June 15, 1993) was a Canadian football player who played for the Saskatchewan Roughriders. He won the Grey Cup with them 1966. He died of liver disease in 1993.

He is the brother of former Canadian football linebacker Wayne Shaw.
