= Ed Harrington =

American gridiron football player (1941–2011)

Profile
- Position: Defensive end

Personal information
- Born: February 8, 1941; Speer, Oklahoma, U.S.
- Died: November 26, 2011 (aged 70); Field, Ontario, Canada
- Listed height: 6 ft 3 in (1.91 m)
- Listed weight: 225 lb (102 kg)

Career information
- College: Langston

Career history
- 1963–1965 1967–1971, 1974: Toronto Argonauts

Awards and highlights
- 3× CFL All-Star (1968, 1969, 1970); 4× CFL East All-Star (1964, 1968, 1969, 1970)

Ed Harrington (February 8, 1941 – November 26, 2011) was a star defensive lineman in the Canadian Football League.

Harrington played college football at Langston University and later with the Toronto Rifles of the Continental Football League. He had a 10-year career in the Canadian Football League from 1963 to 1974 for the Toronto Argonauts. He was a CFL All-Star three times. His name was put in the All-time Argos on September 19, 2010.

== Personal ==
During his career, Harrington worked with various community organization in Toronto including Physical Director of the Toronto YMCA. After football, he worked at the Ontario Ombudsman Office (1974–1986), patient advocate at psychiatric hospitals in Whitby and North Bay.

Harrington died in Field, Ontario of cancer and survived by wife Terryl.
