= Barry Aldag =

Canadian football player

Profile
- Positions: Offensive lineman, Offensive tackle, Defensive tackle

Personal information
- Born: c. 1945
- Listed height: 6 ft 0 in (1.83 m)
- Listed weight: 240 lb (109 kg)

Career information
- CJFL: Regina Rams

Career history
- 1968–1971: Saskatchewan Roughriders

Barry Aldag (born c. 1945) is a Canadian former professional football offensive lineman and defensive tackle who played for the Saskatchewan Roughriders of the Canadian Football League. From 1968 to 1971, he played in 51 regular season games and recovered three fumbles.
