= Andy Walton =

Canadian football player (born 1945)

Andrew Walton
Profile
- Position: Running back

Personal information
- Born: c. 1945 (age 80–81)
- Listed height: 5 ft 9 in (1.75 m)
- Listed weight: 180 lb (82 kg)

Career information
- College: Jackson State

Career history
- 1968: Montreal Alouettes
- 1969: Ottawa Rough Riders

Awards and highlights
- Grey Cup champion (1969)

Andrew Walton (born c. 1945) was a Canadian football player who played for the Ottawa Rough Riders and Montreal Alouettes. He won the Grey Cup with Ottawa in 1969. He previously played college football at Jackson State University.
