= Frank Andruski =

American gridiron football player (born 1943)

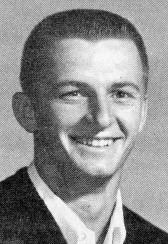
- Andruski, circa 1964

No. 24
- Position: Defensive back

Personal information
- Born: July 14, 1943 (age 83)
- Listed height: 6 ft 2 in (1.88 m)
- Listed weight: 190 lb (86 kg)

Career information
- High school: Olinda (Brea, CA)
- College: Utah (1963-1964)
- NFL draft: 1965: 14th round, 184th overall pick

Career history
- 1966–1973: Calgary Stampeders
- 1974: Portland Storm

Awards and highlights
- Grey Cup champion (1971); 3× CFL All-Star (1967, 1968, 1971); 6× CFL West All-Star (1967, 1968, 1969, 1971, 1972, 1973)

Frank Andruski (born July 14, 1943) is an American former professional football player in the Canadian Football League (CFL) for eight years. Andruski played defensive back for the Calgary Stampeders from 1966 to 1973. He was a CFL All-Star in 1967, 1968 and 1971, and was a part of the Stampeders 1971 Grey Cup winning team. He played college football at the University of Utah. He played one season in the WFL with the Portland Storm.
