= John Cimba =

Canadian football player

Profile
- Positions: Halfback, Linebacker

Personal information
- Listed height: 6 ft 0 in (1.83 m)
- Listed weight: 210 lb (95 kg)

Career history
- 1964–1967: Hamilton Tiger-Cats

Awards and highlights
- Grey Cup champion (1965, 1967)

John E. Cimba was a Canadian professional football player who played for the Hamilton Tiger-Cats. He won the Grey Cup with them in 1965 and 1967. He played college football at the University of Buffalo. He is a member of the University of Buffalo Hall of Fame, inducted in 1988. Draft candidate of The Green Bay Packers, played 4 years with The Hamilton Tiger Cats of the Canadian Football League as outside linebacker and fullback, later ran a brokerage firm and owner of several businesses in Toronto.

In a business started by his father he developed as owner 7 plants with over 100 stores in the Retail Business. In addition he developed over 200 sales force in direct marketing. Owner of several businesses. As a resident of Florida he owns a successful business brokerage firm The Business Exchange of Florida www.TBXflorida.com
