= Vic Washington =

American gridiron football player (1946–2008)

No. 22, 23, 33
- Positions: Running back, safety

Personal information
- Born: March 23, 1946; Plainfield, New Jersey, U.S.
- Died: December 31, 2008 (aged 62); Allentown, Pennsylvania, U.S.
- Listed height: 5 ft 11 in (1.80 m)
- Listed weight: 197 lb (89 kg)

Career information
- High school: Plainfield
- College: Wyoming
- NFL draft: 1970: 4th round, 87th overall pick

Career history
- Ottawa Rough Riders (1968–1969); B.C. Lions (1970); San Francisco 49ers (1971–1973); Houston Oilers (1974); Buffalo Bills (1975–1976)

Awards and highlights
- Pro Bowl (1971); 2× Grey Cup champion (1968, 1969); Grey Cup Most Valuable Player (1968); 2× CFL All-Star (1968, 1969); 2× CFL East All-Star (1968, 1969)

Career NFL statistics
- Rushing attempts: 588
- Rushing yards: 2,208
- Rushing touchdowns: 16
- Receptions: 130
- Receiving yards: 1,090
- Receiving touchdowns: 5
- Stats at Pro Football Reference

Victor Arnold Washington (March 23, 1946 – December 31, 2008) was an American professional football player who was a running back and kick returner in the Canadian Football League (CFL) and National Football League (NFL). After attending the University of Wyoming, he played nine professional seasons, three in the CFL and six in the NFL.

== Early life ==
Washington, who never knew his father, was born to 16-year old Marion Washington in Plainfield, New Jersey in 1946. She was often unable to support him, and he spent much of his childhood being raised by his grandmother, as well as some time in an orphanage.

He played baseball, track, and football at Plainfield High School (New Jersey), where his football talent earned him a scholarship to Wyoming.

== College career ==
Washington played for Wyoming from 1965 to 1967, as a running back, defensive back, and kick returner. As a sophomore, he intercepted three passes and returned 34 punts for 443 yards. In his Junior season, Washington set school records for punt return yards in a season (53 for 565 yards and 2 touchdowns) and in a single game (145 yards). He also had a 95-yard kickoff return touchdown, 40 tackles, 22 pass deflections, and four interceptions. With a team that featured Washington and star running back Jim Kiick, Wyoming finished the season undefeated at 10–0 before losing to Louisiana State University in the Sugar Bowl, 28–13.

The Sugar Bowl loss turned out to be Washington's final college game. A few months later, Washington was charged with assaulting a 19-year-old student referee during an intramural basketball game. He pleaded guilty and received 5-day suspended jail sentence and a 25-dollar fine. Wyoming permanently expelled him. Despite this, Wyoming still voted him into their Athletic Hall of Fame in 2005.

== Professional football career ==
Washington was not drafted by the NFL when he was expelled, but he soon found an opportunity with the Canadian Football League. He joined the Ottawa Rough Riders in 1968. He shared the backfield with future NFL running back Bo Scott. Washington ran 109 times for 678 yards with seven touchdowns in his rookie season. He was also utilized as a receiver and returner. He caught 25 passes for Ottawa in 1968 for 426 yards for two touchdowns. Ottawa advanced all the way to the Grey Cup against the Calgary Stampeders. With Ottawa trailing 14–11 in the fourth quarter, Washington was part of a "quick pitch sweep left" play that would see him take a toss from the quarterback that saw the ball hit the ground but bounce right back to his arm that he would then take for a 79-yard touchdown run from scrimmage, establishing a Grey Cup record that still stands. Ottawa would prevail 24–21 for their first Grey Cup in eight years. Washington was the leading rusher in the game, running 13 times for 128 yards while also catching three passes for 25 yards while receiving the Most Valuable Player Award. The following year, he ran 117 times for 717 yards and five touchdowns while also catching 47 passes for 760 yards and eight touchdowns. He did not play in the 1969 matchup against the Saskatchewan Roughriders due to recovering from a broken leg. In 1970, the San Francisco 49ers drafted Washington in the fourth round. He elected to play for the BC Lions that season, where he was utilized more as a receiver than rusher, catching 28 passes for 475 yards (while rushing only three times) before joining the 49ers as a free agent.

Washington would be utilized for each of rushing, receiving, and returning kicks that season for San Francisco. He scored his first NFL touchdown in Week 2 in a win against the New Orleans Saints on a 46-yard return. He had his first multi-touchdown game against the Saints seven weeks later on two touchdown receptions. In total, Washington ran 191 times for 811 yards while catching 36 passes for 317 yards and returning 33 kicks for 858 yards for a total of seven touchdowns and a league-leading 1,986 all-purpose yards. In 1971, he rushed for 811 yards with a 4.2 average, which led the league with 1,986 all-purpose yards. It garnered him his first and only Pro Bowl. That year, Washington was part of the playoff run for the team. He ran for 59 yards on 16 carries with one catch and four returns in the 24-20 victory over Washington to set up a second-straight NFC Championship Game against the Dallas Cowboys. In that game, he had ten carries for 58 yards while catching three passes for 28 yards as the Cowboys won 14-3. In the next season, Washington ran 141 times for 468 yards while catching 43 passes for 393 yards and returning 27 kicks for 771 yards with five total touchdowns. In the Divisional Round game against Dallas, he started the game off with a 97-yard kickoff return for a touchdown. It set a new record for the longest kick return in a postseason game (previously set by Ed Podolak in 1971), a mark that stood until Fulton Walker returned a kick 98 yards for Miami in Super Bowl XVII eleven years later; Washington's 97 yard return is still the longest for a 49er in a postseason game. He ran ten times for 56 yards with one reception but the Cowboys rallied late to win 30-28. In 1973 preseason, Washington suffered a cracked kneecap due to a hard tackle on artificial turf that saw him put on painkillers and cortisone injections. He ran 151 times for 534 yards in his third season with the 49ers to go with 33 catches for 238 yards and 24 returns for 549 yards with no touchdowns on the season.

He joined the Houston Oilers for 1974. Washington ran 74 times for 281 yards while catching just thirteen passes for 92 yards with seven returns for 177 yards and two total touchdowns. He then joined the Buffalo Bills to close out his last two seasons in the NFL, where he played mostly as returner in 1975, running back 35 kickoffs for 923 yards. He played only the opening two games in 1976, rushing for nine yards on three carries in his final game on September 19 against Houston.

In his NFL career, Washington rushed for 2,208 yards on 588 carries for 16 touchdowns while having 130 receptions for 1,090 yards and 129 kick returns for 3,341 yards for 22 overall touchdowns.

== NFL career statistics ==
Legend
| **Bold** | Career high |

=== Regular season ===
| Year | Team | Games | | Rushing | | | | | Receiving | | | | |
| Year | Team | GP | GS | Att | Yds | Avg | Lng | TD | Rec | Yds | Avg | Lng | TD |
|---|---|---|---|---|---|---|---|---|---|---|---|---|---|
| 1971 | SFO | **14** | **13** | **191** | **811** | 4.2 | **42** | 3 | 36 | 317 | 8.8 | **40** | **4** |
| 1972 | SFO | 13 | **13** | 141 | 468 | 3.3 | 33 | 3 | **43** | **393** | 9.1 | 33 | 1 |
| 1973 | SFO | 13 | **13** | 151 | 534 | 3.5 | 25 | **8** | 33 | 238 | 7.2 | 20 | 0 |
| 1974 | HOU | 12 | 5 | 74 | 281 | 3.8 | 23 | 2 | 13 | 92 | 7.1 | 15 | 0 |
| 1975 | BUF | 13 | 4 | 9 | 49 | **5.4** | 9 | 0 | 2 | 21 | **10.5** | 15 | 0 |
| 1976 | BUF | 2 | 1 | 22 | 65 | 3.0 | 10 | 0 | 3 | 29 | 9.7 | 11 | 0 |
| | | 67 | 49 | 588 | 2,208 | 3.8 | 42 | 16 | 130 | 1,090 | 8.4 | 40 | 5 |

=== Playoffs ===
| Year | Team | Games | | Rushing | | | | | Receiving | | | | |
| Year | Team | GP | GS | Att | Yds | Avg | Lng | TD | Rec | Yds | Avg | Lng | TD |
|---|---|---|---|---|---|---|---|---|---|---|---|---|---|
| 1971 | SFO | **2** | **2** | **26** | **117** | 4.5 | **27** | 0 | **4** | **38** | **9.5** | **20** | 0 |
| 1972 | SFO | 1 | 1 | 10 | 56 | **5.6** | 22 | 0 | 1 | 8 | 8.0 | 8 | 0 |
| | | 3 | 3 | 36 | 173 | 4.8 | 27 | 0 | 5 | 46 | 9.2 | 20 | 0 |

== Post NFL ==
Washington struggled heavily after his playing career was over, due to lingering injuries and a drug addiction, which led to the breakup of his marriage and a brief period of homelessness. In 1983 he filed for disability benefits with the NFL, citing a degenerative bone disease and depression. He was diagnosed with arthritis, degenerative joint disease and other ailments but was awarded just $750 a month out of a possible $4,000.

== Death ==
Washington died in Allentown, Pennsylvania, on December 31, 2008, at the age of 62. He was survived by his four children and three grandchildren.

== See also ==
- List of NCAA major college yearly punt and kickoff return leaders
