= Basil Bark =

Canadian football player

No. 45
- Positions: Centre, Linebacker

Personal information
- Born: July 21, 1945 (age 81); Montreal, Quebec, Canada
- Listed height: 6 ft 3 in (1.91 m)
- Listed weight: 250 lb (113 kg)

Career information
- Junior team: Notre-Dame-de-Grace Maple Leafs (QSFL)

Career history
- 1965–1969: Montreal Alouettes
- 1970–1977: Calgary Stampeders

Awards and highlights
- Grey Cup champion (1971); 2× CFL East All-Star (1968, 1969); 2× CFL West All-Star (1971, 1973)

Basil Bark (born July 21, 1945) is a Canadian former professional football offensive lineman who played 13 seasons in the Canadian Football League for two different teams. He was a member of the Calgary Stampeders 1971 Grey Cup-winning team.
