= List of Hofstra Pride in the NFL draft =

This is a list of Hofstra Pride football players in the NFL draft.

== Key ==
B	Back	K	Kicker	NT	Nose tackle
C	Center	LB	Linebacker	FB	Fullback
DB	Defensive back	P	Punter	HB	Halfback
DE	Defensive end	QB	Quarterback	WR	Wide receiver
DT	Defensive tackle	RB	Running back	G	Guard
E	End	T	Offensive tackle	TE	Tight end

== Selections ==
Year	Round	Pick	Overall	Player	Team	Position
1955	27	5	318	Bill Sanford	Pittsburgh Steelers	B
1963	10	2	128	Terry Kosens	Minnesota Vikings	B
1967	5	3	110	Fran Lynch	Denver Broncos	RB
1968	10	18	264	Mike D'Amato	New York Jets	DB
1969	6	1	131	Wandy Williams	Denver Broncos	RB
1969	17	21	437	Jim Thorpe	Los Angeles Rams	DB
1971	8	20	202	Tony Garay	Los Angeles Rams	DE
1991	10	16	266	Erik Rigoen	Seattle Seahawks	LB
1998	4	27	119	Lance Schulters	San Francisco 49ers	DB
2000	3	3	65	Giovanni Carmazzi	San Francisco 49ers	QB
2006	4	34	131	Willie Colon	Pittsburgh Steelers	G
2006	7	44	252	Marques Colston	New Orleans Saints	WR
