= John Couture =

Canadian football player

Profile
- Position: Slotback

Personal information
- Born: September 6, 1947 (age 79); Hamilton, Ontario, Canada
- Listed height: 5 ft 8 in (1.73 m)
- Listed weight: 170 lb (77 kg)

Career history
- 1970: Montreal Alouettes

Awards and highlights
- Grey Cup champion (1970)

John Couture (born September 6, 1947) is a Canadian former professional football player who played for the Montreal Alouettes. He won the Grey Cup with them in 1970. He previously played junior football for the Hamilton Hurricanes.
