= Ed Learn =

Canadian football player (1935–2026)

Profile
- Position: Defensive back

Personal information
- Born: September 30, 1934; Welland, Ontario, Canada
- Died: March 7, 2026 (aged 90)
- Listed height: 6 ft 0 in (1.83 m)
- Listed weight: 170 lb (77 kg)

Career history
- 1958–1966: Montreal Alouettes
- 1967–1969: Toronto Argonauts

Awards and highlights
- CFL All-Star (1968); 4× CFL East All-Star (1964, 1966, 1968, 1969)

Ed Learn (September 30, 1935 – March 7, 2026) was a Canadian football player in the Canadian Football League for twelve years. He starred as a defensive back for the Montreal Alouettes, where he played from 1959 to 1966 before finishing his career during the last three years as a member of the Toronto Argonauts. He had 34 interceptions with Montreal, his top total being 6 during both 1959 and 1966 seasons. In Toronto, he closed his career with 7 interceptions in 1968 and 8 in 1969. For his efforts, he was named CFL east all-star in 1964, 1966, 1968, and 1969. In addition, he was often used as a punt returner, returning 496 punts for a lifetime average of 6.0 yards per return.

After his CFL career, he became owner of car dealerships in Welland, St Catharines, Guelph and Cambridge Ontario.

Learn died on March 7, 2026, at the age of 90.
