= Jim Worden =

American gridiron football player (1942–2007)

Profile
- Positions: End, tight end

Personal information
- Born: May 16, 1942; Lorain, Ohio, U.S.
- Died: February 25, 2007 (aged 64); Springfield, Ohio, U.S.
- Listed height: 6 ft 1 in (1.85 m)
- Listed weight: 230 lb (104 kg)

Career information
- High school: Clearview (Lorain, Ohio)
- College: Wittenberg

Career history
- 1964: Dallas Cowboys*
- 1964–1969: Saskatchewan Roughriders
- * Offseason or practice squad member only

Awards and highlights
- 2× All-OAC (1962, 1963); Grey Cup champion (1966); CFL All-Star (1966); CFL West All-Star (19660

Career CFL statistics
- Games played: 97

James F. Worden (May 16, 1942 – February 25, 2007) was a tight end in the Canadian Football League (CFL) for the Saskatchewan Roughriders. He played college football at Wittenberg University.

== Early life ==
Worden attended Clearview High School, where he played as a linebacker and offensive end, while helping his team win a championship in 1959 and earning Lakeland Conference honors.

He moved on to Division III Wittenberg College, where he played as an offensive and defensive end. He was a member of teams that had a combined record of 33-2-1 and won three Ohio Athletic Conference championships under head coach Bill Edwards. He was twice selected All-OAC and was the top vote getter on the All-league team as a junior.

In 1988, he was inducted into the Wittenberg University Athletics Hall of Honor.

== Professional career ==
Worden was selected by the Dallas Cowboys in the 14th round (185th overall) of the 1964 NFL draft. He was waived before the start of the season.

In 1964, he signed with the Saskatchewan Roughriders of the Canadian Football League. He played as a tight end and was also known as a great blocker, helping fullback George Reed being named the CFL's Most Outstanding Player in 1965.

In 1966, he made a career-high 28 receptions for 462 yards and 3 touchdowns. In the 29-14 Grey Cup win against the Ottawa Rough Riders, he was the leading receiver with 3 receptions for 48 yards, including a six-yard touchdown reception in the first quarter. He also played in the 1967 Grey Cup.

Worden finished his career with 97 receptions for 1,789 yards, an 18.4 yards per catch average and 11 touchdowns. In 1996, he was inducted into the Roughriders Plaza of Honor.

== Personal life ==
After football he returned to the Cleveland area, where he was a high school teacher at Columbia High School, before working in highway construction as a member of the Laborers Union Local 758 until his retirement in 1998.

His father Jim played in the NFL for the Cleveland Rams in 1945. His brother Dirk was a captain of the 1968 Ohio State University Football National Championship team, coached by Woody Hayes.

On February 25, 2007, Worden died of a heart attack after a period of declining health.
