= 1969 CFL season =

Canadian Football League season

- East champions: Ottawa Rough Riders
- West champions: Saskatchewan Roughriders

57th Grey Cup
- Champions: Ottawa Rough Riders

CFL seasons
- 1968 1970

Canadian Football League team locations: West, East

The 1969 CFL season is considered to be the 16th season in modern-day Canadian football, although it was officially the 12th Canadian Football League season.

== CFL news in 1969 ==
Home teams started wearing their coloured (dark) jerseys.

The 1969 Grey Cup game started play on a Sunday for the first time in CFL history; all Grey Cup games since (except for 1970) have been played on a Sunday. (The CFL did play a Grey Cup game on Sunday before, in 1962, when the original Saturday Grey Cup game was delayed due to heavy fog that caused the final 9 minutes and 28 seconds to be played the following day.)

The Grey Cup was held in Montreal, Quebec for the first time since 1931.

A new logo was introduced to the league on November 26, four days before that year's Grey Cup game: A white helmet with a one-bar face mask with a maple leaf in the centre and the word CFL in white in the maple leaf. It replaced the leaf/football/ribbon logo used since the league's formation in 1958, and would be used until 2002.

Records: The Rough Riders' Margene Adkins set the record for average gain per pass in a season with 25.0 yards. The record stood for 28 years, until Milt Stegall broke it.

== Regular season standings ==
West Division
| Pos | Team | Pld | W | L | T | PF | PA | PD | Pts |
|---|---|---|---|---|---|---|---|---|---|
| 1 | Saskatchewan Roughriders (C, Q) | 16 | 13 | 3 | 0 | 392 | 261 | +131 | 26 |
| 2 | Calgary Stampeders (Q) | 16 | 9 | 7 | 0 | 327 | 314 | +13 | 18 |
| 3 | BC Lions (Q) | 16 | 5 | 11 | 0 | 235 | 335 | −100 | 10 |
| 4 | Edmonton Eskimos | 16 | 5 | 11 | 0 | 241 | 246 | −5 | 10 |
| 5 | Winnipeg Blue Bombers | 16 | 3 | 12 | 1 | 192 | 359 | −167 | 7 |

(C) First round bye; (Q) Qualified for playoffs

East Division
| Pos | Team | Pld | W | L | T | PF | PA | PD | Pts |
|---|---|---|---|---|---|---|---|---|---|
| 1 | Ottawa Rough Riders (C, Q) | 14 | 11 | 3 | 0 | 399 | 298 | +101 | 22 |
| 2 | Toronto Argonauts (Q) | 14 | 10 | 4 | 0 | 406 | 280 | +126 | 20 |
| 3 | Hamilton Tiger-Cats (Q) | 14 | 8 | 5 | 1 | 307 | 315 | −8 | 17 |
| 4 | Montreal Alouettes | 14 | 2 | 10 | 2 | 304 | 395 | −91 | 6 |

(C) First round bye; (Q) Qualified for playoffs

Saskatchewan and Ottawa had first round byes.

== Grey Cup playoffs ==
Note: All dates in 1969

=== Conference semi-finals ===
Western semi-finals
BC Lions @ Calgary Stampeders
| Date | Away | Home |
|---|---|---|
| November 8 | BC Lions 21 | Calgary Stampeders 35 |

Eastern semi-finals
Hamilton Tiger-Cats @ Toronto Argonauts
| Date | Away | Home |
|---|---|---|
| November 9 | Hamilton Tiger-Cats 9 | Toronto Argonauts 15 |

=== Conference finals ===
Western finals
Calgary Stampeders vs Saskatchewan Roughriders
| Game | Date | Away | Home |
|---|---|---|---|
| 1 | November 15 | Calgary Stampeders 11 | Saskatchewan Roughriders 17 |
| 2 | November 19 | Saskatchewan Roughriders 36 | Calgary Stampeders 13 |
Saskatchewan won the best of three series 2–0.

Eastern finals
Ottawa Rough Riders vs Toronto Argonauts
| Game | Date | Away | Home |
|---|---|---|---|
| 1 | November 16 | Ottawa Rough Riders 14 | Toronto Argonauts 22 |
| 2 | November 22 | Toronto Argonauts 3 | Ottawa Rough Riders 32 |
Ottawa won the 2 game total-point series by 46–25.

== Playoff bracket ==
Division semifinals
East
E2 | Toronto Argonauts | 15
E3 | Hamilton Tiger Cats | 9
West
W2 | Calgary Stampeders | 35
W3 | BC Lions | 21

Division finals
E1 | Ottawa Rough Riders | 46 (14+32)
E2 | Toronto Argonauts | 25 (22+3)
W1 | Saskatchewan Roughriders | 2 (17,36)
W2 | Calgary Stampeders | 0 (11,13)

57th Grey Cup
E1 | Ottawa Rough Riders | 29
W1 | Saskatchewan Roughriders | 11

=== Grey Cup Championship ===
November 30 57th Annual Grey Cup Game: Autostade—Montreal, Quebec
| Western Champion | Eastern Champion |
|---|---|
| Saskatchewan Roughriders 11 | Ottawa Rough Riders 29 |
1969 Grey Cup Champions: Ottawa Rough Riders
Grey Cup Most Valuable Player: Russ Jackson (QB), Ottawa Rough Riders

== CFL leaders ==
- CFL passing leaders
- CFL rushing leaders
- CFL receiving leaders

== 1969 CFL All-Stars ==
=== Offence ===
- QB – Russ Jackson, Ottawa Rough Riders
- RB – George Reed, Saskatchewan Roughriders
- RB – Vic Washington, Ottawa Rough Riders
- RB – Dave Raimey, Toronto Argonauts
- TE – Herman Harrison, Calgary Stampeders
- SE – Margene Adkins, Ottawa Rough Riders
- F – Ken Nielsen, Winnipeg Blue Bombers
- C – Ted Urness, Saskatchewan Roughriders
- OG – Jack Abendschan, Saskatchewan Roughriders
- OG – Charlie Bray, Toronto Argonauts
- OT – Clyde Brock, Saskatchewan Roughriders
- OT – Ellison Kelly, Hamilton Tiger-Cats

=== Defence ===
- DT – John LaGrone, Edmonton Eskimos
- DT – Ed McQuarters, Saskatchewan Roughriders
- DE – Billy Joe Booth, Ottawa Rough Riders
- DE – Ed Harrington, Toronto Argonauts
- LB – Ken Lehmann, Ottawa Rough Riders
- LB – Jerry "Soupy" Campbell, Ottawa Rough Riders
- LB – Phil Minnick, Winnipeg Blue Bombers
- DB – John Wydarney, Edmonton Eskimos
- DB – Marv Luster, Toronto Argonauts
- DB – Bruce Bennett, Saskatchewan Roughriders
- DB – Don Sutherin, Ottawa Rough Riders
- DB – Garney Henley, Hamilton Tiger-Cats
- DB – Larry Fairholm, Montreal Alouettes

== 1969 Eastern All-Stars ==
=== Offence ===
- QB – Russ Jackson, Ottawa Rough Riders
- RB – Dennis Duncan, Montreal Alouettes
- RB – Vic Washington, Ottawa Rough Riders
- RB – Dave Raimey, Toronto Argonauts
- TE – Mel Profit, Toronto Argonauts
- SE – Margene Adkins, Ottawa Rough Riders
- F – Bobby Taylor, Toronto Argonauts
- C – Basil Bark, Montreal Alouettes
- OG – Charlie Parker, Montreal Alouettes
- OG – Charlie Bray, Toronto Argonauts
- OT – Danny Nykoluk, Toronto Argonauts
- OT – Ellison Kelly, Hamilton Tiger-Cats

=== Defence ===
- DT – John Barrow, Hamilton Tiger-Cats
- DT – Marshall Shirk, Ottawa Rough Riders
- DE – Billy Joe Booth, Ottawa Rough Riders
- DE – Ed Harrington, Toronto Argonauts
- LB – Ken Lehmann, Ottawa Rough Riders
- LB – Jerry "Soupy" Campbell, Ottawa Rough Riders
- LB – Henry Sorrell, Hamilton Tiger-Cats
- DB – Ed Learn, Toronto Argonauts
- DB – Marv Luster, Toronto Argonauts
- DB – Dick Thornton, Toronto Argonauts
- DB – Don Sutherin, Ottawa Rough Riders
- DB – Garney Henley, Hamilton Tiger-Cats

== 1969 Western All-Stars ==
=== Offence ===
- QB – Ron Lancaster, Saskatchewan Roughriders
- RB – George Reed, Saskatchewan Roughriders
- RB – Jim Evenson, BC Lions
- RB – Jim Young, BC Lions
- TE – Herman Harrison, Calgary Stampeders
- SE – Terry Evanshen, Calgary Stampeders
- F – Ken Nielsen, Winnipeg Blue Bombers
- F – Hugh Campbell, Saskatchewan Roughriders
- C – Ted Urness, Saskatchewan Roughriders
- OG – Jack Abendschan, Saskatchewan Roughriders
- OG – Ken Sugarman, BC Lions
- OT – Clyde Brock, Saskatchewan Roughriders
- OT – Lanny Boleski, Calgary Stampeders

=== Defence ===
- DT – John LaGrone, Edmonton Eskimos
- DT – Ed McQuarters, Saskatchewan Roughriders
- DE – Bill Whisler, Winnipeg Blue Bombers
- DE – John Helton, Calgary Stampeders
- LB – Wayne Harris, Calgary Stampeders
- LB – Wayne Shaw, Saskatchewan Roughriders
- LB – Wally Dempsey, Saskatchewan Roughriders
- DB – John Wydarney, Edmonton Eskimos
- DB – Frank Andruski, Calgary Stampeders
- DB – Bruce Bennett, Saskatchewan Roughriders
- DB – Jerry Bradley, BC Lions
- DB – Rich Robinson, BC Lions

== 1969 CFL awards ==
- CFL's Most Outstanding Player Award – Russ Jackson (QB), Ottawa Rough Riders
- CFL's Most Outstanding Canadian Award – Russ Jackson (QB), Ottawa Rough Riders
- CFL's Most Outstanding Lineman Award – John LaGrone (DT), Edmonton Eskimos
- CFL's Coach of the Year – Frank Clair, Ottawa Rough Riders
- Jeff Russel Memorial Trophy (Eastern MVP) – Russ Jackson (QB), Ottawa Rough Riders
- Jeff Nicklin Memorial Trophy (Western MVP) - Ron Lancaster (QB), Saskatchewan Roughriders
- Gruen Trophy (Eastern Rookie of the Year) - Al Phaneuf (DB), Montreal Alouettes
- Dr. Beattie Martin Trophy (Western Rookie of the Year) - Dave Easley (DB), BC Lions
- DeMarco–Becket Memorial Trophy (Western Outstanding Lineman) - Ed McQuarters (DT), Saskatchewan Roughriders
