= Gord Christian =

Canadian football player (1946–2008)

Profile
- Positions: Halfback, End

Personal information
- Born: March 3, 1946
- Died: September 23, 2008 (aged 62); Cochrane, Ontario, Canada
- Listed height: 6 ft 4 in (1.93 m)
- Listed weight: 228 lb (103 kg)

Career history
- 1967–1972: Hamilton Tiger-Cats

Awards and highlights
- Grey Cup champion (1967, 1972)

Gord Christian (March 6, 1946 – September 23, 2008) was a Canadian football player who played for the Hamilton Tiger-Cats. He won the Grey Cup in 1967 and 1972.
