= Bruce Bennett (Canadian football) =

American gridiron football player (1943–2021)

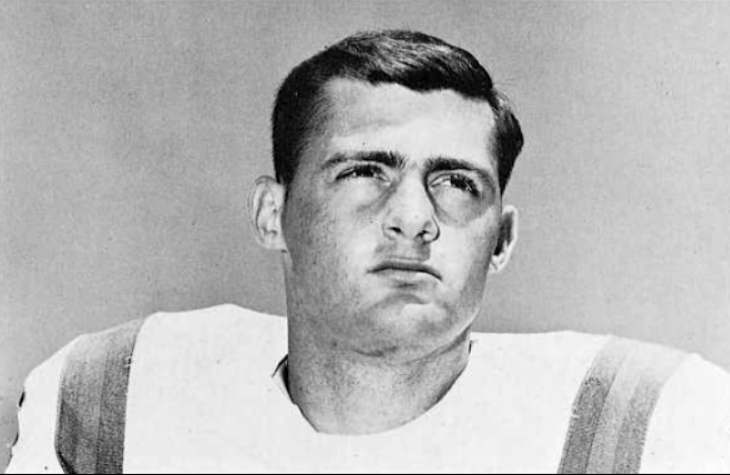
- Bennett from 1965 Seminole yearbook

No. 30
- Position: Safety

Personal information
- Born: December 13, 1943; Valdosta, Georgia, U.S.
- Died: January 12, 2021 (aged 77); Ocala, Florida, U.S.
- Listed height: 5 ft 10 in (1.78 m)
- Listed weight: 175 lb (79 kg)

Career information
- High school: Valdosta
- College: Florida

Career history
- 1966–1972: Saskatchewan Roughriders

Awards and highlights
- Grey Cup champion (1966); CFL All-Star (1969); 6× CFL West All-Star (1967, 1968, 1969, 1970, 1971, 1972); First-team All-American (1965); Second-team All-American (1964); 2× First-team All-SEC (1964, 1965); University of Florida Athletic Hall of Fame

Career CFL statistics
- Games played: 112
- Interceptions: 35
- INT return yards: 606

Lamar Bruce Bennett Jr. (December 13, 1943 – January 12, 2021) was an American college and professional football player who was a safety in the Canadian Football League (CFL) for seven seasons during the 1960s and early 1970s. He played college football for the University of Florida, and was recognized as an All-American. Thereafter, Bennett played professionally for the Saskatchewan Roughriders of the CFL.

== Early life ==
Bennett was born in Valdosta, Georgia, in 1943. He attended Valdosta High School, and played quarterback for the Valdosta Wildcats high school football team. As a junior in 1960, he led the Wildcats to a 20–14 victory over Avondale High School in the Georgia state championship game. Bennett ran for a touchdown, threw for another, and ran for a third with twenty-nine seconds remaining to win the game. As a senior in 1961, he was recognized as a high school All-American.

== College years ==
Bennett accepted an athletic scholarship to attend the University of Florida in Gainesville, Florida, and played for coach Ray Graves' Florida Gators football team from 1963 to 1965. Bennett set a Gators career record with thirteen interceptions, including three in the Gators' 21–14 victory over the Georgia Bulldogs in 1963. He was the senior defensive team captain of the 1965 Gators team that finished 7–3 and earned a berth in the 1966 Sugar Bowl, the Gators' first-ever New Year's Day bowl. He was a first-team All-Southeastern Conference (SEC) selection in 1964 and 1965, and a United Press International first-team All-American in 1965. Ray Graves rated Bennett as the Gators' best free safety of the 1960s.

Bennett graduated from the university with a bachelor's degree in 1968, and was later inducted into the University of Florida Athletic Hall of Fame as a "Gator Great." In a 2006 article series published by The Gainesville Sun, the Sun sports editors rated him as the No. 38 all-time greatest Gator from the first 100 years of Florida football.

== Professional career ==
Bennett joined the CFL's Saskatchewan Roughriders in 1966, and participated in the team's 29–10 Grey Cup victory over Ottawa. He played for the Roughriders from 1966 to 1972, and became one of the league's top safeties. He also was the team's go-to "good hands" player for onside kicks, and served as the team's emergency quarterback, completing 8 of 17 passes in his CFL career. He registered career highs of eight interceptions in both 1969 and 1971. In seven CFL seasons, Bennett played in 112 games, and totaled thirty-five interceptions (including two he returned for touchdowns), and 606 return yards. His career interception total still ranks third on the Roughriders' all-time list. Bennett's teammates selected him as the team captain four times, and he earned six Western Conference All-Star selections (1967–1972) and one CFL All-Star selection (1969).

== Death ==
Bruce Bennett died from complications of pneumonia and COVID-19 in Ocala, Florida, on January 12, 2021. He was 77.

== See also ==
- 1965 College Football All-America Team
- List of Florida Gators football All-Americans
- List of University of Florida alumni
