= 1967 CFL season =

Canadian Football League season

- Duration: June – October, 1967
- East champions: Hamilton Tiger-Cats
- West champions: Saskatchewan Roughriders

55th Grey Cup
- Date: December 2, 1967
- Venue: Lansdowne Park, Ottawa
- Champions: Hamilton Tiger-Cats

CFL seasons
- 1966 1968

Canadian Football League team locations: West, East

The 1967 CFL season was the tenth Canadian Football League season, and the 14th season in modern-day Canadian football.

== CFL news in 1967 ==
The offices of the CFL was set up at 11 King Street, inside the Montreal Trust Building in Toronto, with Senator Keith Davey as CFL Commissioner. Later on, Davey was succeeded on Thursday, February 23 by Ted Workman and then later, Allan McEachern.

The Committee on One League (COO) made recommendations to bring operating matters to be under the control of the league; it was later approved by the Board of Governors.

The Canadian Rugby Union changed their name to Canadian Amateur Football Association (now Football Canada) on Sunday, January 1 and turned over the Grey Cup trophy to the CFL.

In addition, the CFL set up and establishes the Players' Pension Fund.

The Hamilton Tiger-Cats wore special helmets to commemorate Canada's Centennial as the country turned 100 years old.

== Regular season standings ==
West Division
Pos	Team	Pld	W	L	T	PF	PA	PD	Pts
1	Calgary Stampeders (C, Q)	16	12	4	0	382	219	+163	24
2	Saskatchewan Roughriders (Q)	16	12	4	0	346	282	+64	24
3	Edmonton Eskimos (Q)	16	9	6	1	266	246	+20	19
4	Winnipeg Blue Bombers	16	4	12	0	212	414	−202	8
5	BC Lions	16	3	12	1	239	319	−80	7

(C) First round bye; (Q) Qualified for playoffs

East Division
Pos	Team	Pld	W	L	T	PF	PA	PD	Pts
1	Hamilton Tiger-Cats (C, Q)	14	10	4	0	250	195	+55	20
2	Ottawa Rough Riders (Q)	14	9	4	1	337	209	+128	19
3	Toronto Argonauts (Q)	14	5	8	1	252	266	−14	11
4	Montreal Alouettes	14	2	12	0	166	302	−136	4

(C) First round bye; (Q) Qualified for playoffs

Calgary and Hamilton have first round byes.

== Grey Cup playoffs ==
Note: All dates in 1967

=== Conference Semi-Finals ===
Western Semi-Finals
Edmonton Eskimos @ Saskatchewan Roughriders
Date	Away	Home
November 11	Edmonton Eskimos 5	Saskatchewan Roughriders 21

Eastern Semi-Finals
Toronto Argonauts @ Ottawa Rough Riders
Date	Away	Home
November 12	Toronto Argonauts 22	Ottawa Rough Riders 38

=== Conference Finals ===
Western Finals
Saskatchewan Roughriders vs Calgary Stampeders
Game	Date	Away	Home
1	November 18	Saskatchewan Roughriders 11	Calgary Stampeders 15
2	November 22	Calgary Stampeders 9	Saskatchewan Roughriders 11
3	November 26	Saskatchewan Roughriders 17	Calgary Stampeders 13
Saskatchewan wins the best of three series 2–1

Eastern Finals
Hamilton Tiger-Cats vs Ottawa Rough Riders
Game	Date	Away	Home
1	November 19	Hamilton Tiger-Cats 11	Ottawa Rough Riders 3
2	November 25	Ottawa Rough Riders 0	Hamilton Tiger-Cats 26
Hamilton won 2 game total-point series 37–3

== Playoff bracket ==
Division Semifinals
East
E2	Ottawa Rough Riders	38
E3	Toronto Argonauts	22
West
W2	Saskatchewan Roughriders	21
W3	Edmonton Eskimos	5

Division Finals
E1	Hamilton Tiger-Cats	37 (11+26)
E2	Ottawa Rough Riders	3 (3+0)
W1	Calgary Stampeders	1 (15,9,13)
W2	Saskatchewan Roughriders	2 (11,11,17)

55th Grey Cup
E1	Hamilton Tiger-Cats	24
W2	Saskatchewan Roughriders	1

=== Grey Cup Championship ===
December 2 55th Annual Grey Cup Game: Lansdowne Park – Ottawa, Ontario
Western Champion	Eastern Champion
Saskatchewan Roughriders 1	Hamilton Tiger-Cats 24
The Hamilton Tiger-Cats are the 1967 Grey Cup Champions
Joe Zuger (QB), Hamilton Tiger-Cats – Grey Cup's Most Valuable Player.

== CFL leaders ==
- CFL passing leaders
- CFL rushing leaders
- CFL receiving leaders

== 1967 CFL All-Stars ==
=== Offence ===
- QB – Peter Liske, Calgary Stampeders
- RB – George Reed, Saskatchewan Roughriders
- RB – Bo Scott, Ottawa Rough Riders
- RB – Jim Thomas, Edmonton Eskimos
- SE – Terry Evanshen, Calgary Stampeders
- TE – Tommy Joe Coffey, Hamilton Tiger-Cats
- F – Whit Tucker, Ottawa Rough Riders
- C – Ted Urness, Saskatchewan Roughriders
- OG – Jack Abendschan, Saskatchewan Roughriders
- OG – Roger Perdrix, Ottawa Rough Riders
- OT – Clyde Brock, Saskatchewan Roughriders
- OT – Bill Frank, Toronto Argonauts

=== Defence ===
- DT – John Barrow, Hamilton Tiger-Cats
- DT – Ed McQuarters, Saskatchewan Roughriders
- DE – E. A. Sims, Edmonton Eskimos
- DE – John Baker, Montreal Alouettes
- LB – Wayne Harris, Calgary Stampeders
- LB – Garner Ekstran, Saskatchewan Roughriders
- LB – Wayne Shaw, Saskatchewan Roughriders
- DB – Jerry Keeling, Calgary Stampeders
- DB – Phil Brady, Montreal Alouettes
- DB – Gene Gaines, Ottawa Rough Riders
- DB – Garney Henley, Hamilton Tiger-Cats
- DB – Frank Andruski, Calgary Stampeders

== 1967 Eastern All-Stars ==
=== Offence ===
- QB – Russ Jackson, Ottawa Rough Riders
- RB – Willie Bethea, Hamilton Tiger-Cats
- RB – Bo Scott, Ottawa Rough Riders
- RB – Jim Dillard, Toronto Argonauts
- SE – Margene Adkins, Ottawa Rough Riders
- TE – Tommy Joe Coffey, Hamilton Tiger-Cats
- F – Whit Tucker, Ottawa Rough Riders
- C – Gene Ceppetelli, Hamilton Tiger-Cats
- OG – Bill Danychuk, Hamilton Tiger-Cats
- OG – Roger Perdrix, Ottawa Rough Riders
- OT – Danny Nykoluk, Toronto Argonauts
- OT – Bill Frank, Toronto Argonauts

=== Defence ===
- DT – John Barrow, Hamilton Tiger-Cats
- DT – Bob Minihane, Montreal Alouettes
- DE – Bob Brown, Ottawa Rough Riders
- DE – John Baker, Montreal Alouettes
- LB – Ken Lehmann, Ottawa Rough Riders
- LB – Mike Blum, Ottawa Rough Riders
- LB – Bob Krouse, Hamilton Tiger-Cats
- DB – Jim Rountree, Toronto Argonauts
- DB – Phil Brady, Montreal Alouettes
- DB – Gene Gaines, Ottawa Rough Riders
- DB – Garney Henley, Hamilton Tiger-Cats
- DB – Marv Luster, Toronto Argonauts

== 1967 Western All-Stars ==
=== Offence ===
- QB – Peter Liske, Calgary Stampeders
- RB – George Reed, Saskatchewan Roughriders
- RB – Dave Raimey, Winnipeg Blue Bombers
- RB – Jim Thomas, Edmonton Eskimos
- SE – Terry Evanshen, Calgary Stampeders
- TE – Herm Harrison, Calgary Stampeders
- F – Ken Nielsen, Winnipeg Blue Bombers
- C – Ted Urness, Saskatchewan Roughriders
- OG – Jack Abendschan, Saskatchewan Roughriders
- OG – Bob Lueck, Calgary Stampeders
- OT – Clyde Brock, Saskatchewan Roughriders
- OT – Roger Kramer, Calgary Stampeders

=== Defence ===
- DT – John LaGrone, Edmonton Eskimos
- DT – Ed McQuarters, Saskatchewan Roughriders
- DE – Bill Whisler, Winnipeg Blue Bombers
- DE – Dick Suderman, Calgary Stampeders
- LB – Wayne Harris, Calgary Stampeders
- LB – Garner Ekstran, Saskatchewan Roughriders
- LB – Wayne Shaw, Saskatchewan Roughriders
- DB – Jerry Keeling, Calgary Stampeders
- DB – John Wydarney, Edmonton Eskimos
- DB – Joe Hernandez, Edmonton Eskimos
- DB – Bruce Bennett, Saskatchewan Roughriders
- DB – Frank Andruski, Calgary Stampeders

== 1967 CFL awards ==
- CFL's Most Outstanding Player Award – Peter Liske (QB), Calgary Stampeders
- CFL's Most Outstanding Canadian Award – Terry Evanshen (TE), Calgary Stampeders
- CFL's Most Outstanding Lineman Award – Ed McQuarters (DT), Saskatchewan Roughriders
- CFL's Coach of the Year – Jerry Williams, Calgary Stampeders
- Jeff Russel Memorial Trophy (Eastern MVP) – Ron Stewart (RB), Ottawa Rough Riders
- Jeff Nicklin Memorial Trophy (Western MVP) - Peter Liske (QB), Calgary Stampeders
- Gruen Trophy (Eastern Rookie of the Year) - Wayne Giardino (LB), Ottawa Rough Riders
- Dr. Beattie Martin Trophy (Western Rookie of the Year) - Ted Gerela (K), BC Lions
- DeMarco–Becket Memorial Trophy (Western Outstanding Lineman) - John LaGrone (DT), Edmonton Eskimos
