= Terry Evanshen =

Canadian retired football player and motivational speaker

No. 25
- Position: Wide receiver

Personal information
- Born: June 13, 1944 (age 82); Montreal, Quebec, Canada
- Listed height: 5 ft 10 in (1.78 m)
- Listed weight: 185 lb (84 kg)

Career information
- College: Utah State

Career history
- 1965: Montreal Alouettes
- 1966–1969: Calgary Stampeders
- 1970–1973: Montreal Alouettes
- 1974–1977: Hamilton Tiger-Cats
- 1978: Toronto Argonauts

Awards and highlights
- Grey Cup champion (1970); 2× Most Outstanding Canadian Award (1967, 1971); Dave Dryburgh Memorial Trophy (1967); 2× Outstanding Canadian - West (1966, 1967); Outstanding Canadian - East (1971); Gruen Trophy (1965); CFL All-Star (1967); 3× CFL East All-Star (1965, 1971, 1975); 3× CFL West All-Star (1967, 1968, 1969); CFL Records: Most receiving touchdowns in a season (Canadian Record) = 17 (1967); Most consecutive games with a touchdown = 10 (1967-1968)
- Canadian Football Hall of Fame (Class of 1984)

Terrence Anthony "Terry" Evanshen (born June 13, 1944) is a motivational speaker and former star receiver in the Canadian Football League.

== CFL ==
Drafted by the Montreal Alouettes, Terry played with the Portland Sea Hawks in 1964 before going on to have an outstanding career in the CFL for 13 seasons from 1965–1978, with the Montreal Alouettes, the Calgary Stampeders, the Hamilton Tiger-Cats, and the Toronto Argonauts playing in 198 games and scoring 80 touchdowns.

Terry won the Gruen Trophy as the Eastern Rookie of the Year in 1965, the Most Outstanding Canadian Award in 1967 and 1971, was an all star 7 times, won the Grey Cup in 1970 and was inducted into the Canadian Football Hall of Fame in 1984.

In 1994, the CFL instituted the Terry Evanshen Trophy which is awarded annually to the Outstanding Player in the East Division.

== Post-football car crash and memory loss ==
On July 4, 1988, Terry's life was nearly ended when a car ran a red light crashing into his Jeep. His injuries were so serious that a priest was called to perform last rites. Against great odds, he survived in a coma, but when he awoke a month later he had no memory of his life before the crash. His struggles with this great loss eventually led him to become a motivational speaker. In the year 2000, author June Callwood wrote an award-winning book, The Man Who Lost Himself: The Terry Evanshen Story, which was turned into a 2005 movie for CTV, The Stranger I Married (also known as The Man Who Lost Himself), starring David James Elliott and Wendy Crewson and directed by Helen Shaver.

== Videos ==
Canadian Football Hall of Fame member on YouTube
