= Larry Fairholm =

Canadian gridiron football player (born 1941)

Profile
- Position: Safety

Personal information
- Born: December 15, 1941 (age 84); Montreal, Quebec, Canada
- Listed height: 6 ft 0 in (1.83 m)
- Listed weight: 195 lb (88 kg)

Career information
- High school: Rosemount (Montreal, Quebec)
- College: Arizona

Career history
- 1965–1972: Montreal Alouettes

Awards and highlights
- Grey Cup champion (1970); CFL All-Star (1969); CFL East All-Star (1968); Jeff Russel Memorial Trophy (1968)

Lawrence D. Fairholm (born December 15, 1941) is a former all-star Canadian Football League safety.

== Junior and college football ==
Fairholm first played football with a Quebec junior team, the Rosemont Bombers, which led to an opportunity to play college ball with the University of Arizona. In 1964, he was second on the Wildcats with 3 interceptions for 43 yards and one touchdown.

== Montreal Alouettes ==
Turning pro in his hometown with the Montreal Alouettes, Fairholm had an 8-year career from 1965 to 1972, in which he did not miss a single game, a total of 112 regular season games. Over this period, Fairholm intercepted 19 passes, returning one for a TD, and returned 2 fumbles for TDs. His best year was 1969, when he picked off 5 passes. He was also a steady punt returner in the days when they were not protected by blocking rules. Chosen as an all-star in both 1968 and 1969, he also won the Jeff Russel Memorial Trophy in 1968 as the Eastern conference MVP in the CFL. His superior play at safety was one of the main reasons the Alouettes won the 58th Grey Cup championship over the Calgary Stampeders.

He has fond memories of his time with the Als:

"I was from the East End of Montreal, kind of a lower-middle-class neighbourhood that was very close-knit. I know the people of Montreal and I know their sentiments so it was a privilege to have that opportunity to come back and play in front of them and for my hometown. Not many kids get that opportunity."

== Personal information ==
He was married to Joyce Edna Marie Sweet (1942-2023) and he has three children - Jeffrey, Randy and Joy. He also has seven grandchildren.

He is retired and now lives in Port Credit, Ontario. He also lived in Ile Bizard in Montreal. He is a former board member of DIRTT Environmental Solutions as well as the Lakeshore General Hospital Foundation. He was a long standing member at Royal Montreal.
