= Billy Joe Booth =

No. 65
- Position: Defensive end

Personal information
- Born: April 7, 1940; Minden, Louisiana, U.S.
- Died: June 30, 1972 (aged 32); Dorchester, Ontario, Canada
- Listed height: 6 ft 0 in (1.83 m)
- Listed weight: 235 lb (107 kg)

Career information
- High school: Minden (LA)
- College: LSU
- NFL draft: 1962: 13th round, 181 (By the New York Giants)th overall pick

Career history
- 1962–1970: Ottawa Rough Riders

Awards and highlights
- 2× Grey Cup champion - 1968, 69; CFL All-Star (1969); 4× CFL East All-Star (1963, 1964, 1966, 1969); Second-team All-SEC (1961)

Billy Joe Booth (April 7, 1940 – June 30, 1972) was an American-born Canadian football player. He played professional football with the Ottawa Rough Riders in the Canadian Football League (CFL) from 1962 to 1970. A graduate of Louisiana State University in Baton Rouge, he was drafted by the New York Giants in round thirteen, draft number 181 of the 1962 NFL draft. Booth was killed in a plane crash in Ontario in 1972.
