= Bill Frank =

American gridiron football player (1938–2014)

No. 68, 76, 64
- Position: Offensive tackle

Personal information
- Born: April 13, 1938; Denver, Colorado, U.S.
- Died: June 26, 2014 (aged 76); White Rock, British Columbia, Canada
- Listed height: 6 ft 5 in (1.96 m)
- Listed weight: 255 lb (116 kg)

Career information
- High school: West (Denver)
- College: Colorado (1960-1961)
- NFL draft: 1963: 18th round, 244th overall pick
- AFL draft: 1963: 24th round, 186th overall pick

Career history
- BC Lions (1962–1964); Dallas Cowboys (1964); Toronto Argonauts (1965–1968); Winnipeg Blue Bombers (1969–1976)

Awards and highlights
- 7× CFL All-Star (1966-1968, 1970-1973); 2× CFL Eastern All-Star (1966, 1967); 5× CFL Western All-Star (1968, 1970-1973); Winnipeg Blue Bombers All-time 90th-Anniversary team

Career NFL statistics
- Games played: 4
- Games started: 1
- Stats at Pro Football Reference
- Canadian Football Hall of Fame

William B. Frank, Jr. (April 13, 1938 – June 26, 2014) was a Canadian football offensive tackle in the Canadian Football League (CFL) for the BC Lions, Toronto Argonauts and Winnipeg Blue Bombers. He also was a member of the Dallas Cowboys in the National Football League (NFL). He played college football at the University of Colorado. He is a member of the Canadian Football Hall of Fame.

== Early life ==
Frank attended West High School. He enrolled at San Diego Junior College in 1959, where he was named to the junior college All-American team.

After his sophomore season he transferred to the University of Colorado, playing until he was declared ineligible when the school was placed on probation by the NCAA in 1962. He was named a member of Colorado's all-time all-star team. He was also practiced wrestling.

== Professional career ==
=== BC Lions ===
Frank began his 15-year CFL career with the BC Lions in 1962 and was a part of the 1963 Grey Cup. He played both offense and defense.

=== Dallas Cowboys ===
Frank was selected by the Dallas Cowboys in the 18th round (244th overall) of the 1963 NFL draft and the San Diego Chargers in the 24th round (186th overall) of the 1963 AFL draft. Because he still was under contract in the Canadian Football League, the Cowboys had to additionally trade running back Amos Bullocks to the BC Lions in exchange for Frank's playing rights. To complicate matters further, he signed a contract with the San Diego Chargers of the American Football League, who selected him in the 24th round (186th overall) of the 1963 AFL draft. The deal was eventually voided by American Football League commissioner Joe Foss.

In 1964, he joined the Cowboys in the week of the ninth game and played in four contests as a backup. He was waived on September 7, 1965.

=== Toronto Argonauts and Winnipeg Blue Bombers ===
In 1965, he was signed in middle of the season to play offensive tackle for the Toronto Argonauts. He played in his first game without any practice time and just hours after arriving from the airport.

In 1968, he held out during training camp and was traded to the Winnipeg Blue Bombers, where he played until 1976. He was an All-star seven times. Frank was named to the Argonauts' quarter-century team, the Blue Bombers' all-time dream team, and in November 2006 was voted one of the CFL's Top 50 players (#49) of the league's modern era by Canadian sports network TSN.

== Personal life ==
Frank spent four years in the Marines. On June 26, 2014, he died in his sleep while at his home in White Rock, British Columbia.

== Awards and honors ==
- CFL All-Star team (offensive tackle) - 1966, 1967, 1968, 1970, 1971, 1972, 1973
- Eastern All-Star (offensive tackle) - 1966, 1967, 1968
- Western All-Star (offensive tackle) - 1970, 1971, 1972, 1973
- Winnipeg Blue Bombers Hall of Fame - 1990
- Canadian Football Hall of Fame - 2001
