= Bill Whisler =

American gridiron football player (born 1940)

Profile
- Positions: Defensive tackle, Defensive end

Personal information
- Born: November 15, 1940 (age 85); Yankton, South Dakota, U.S.
- Listed height: 6 ft 3 in (1.91 m)
- Listed weight: 238 lb (108 kg)

Career history
- 1962–1969: Winnipeg Blue Bombers
- 1970: BC Lions
- 1971: Montreal Alouettes

Awards and highlights
- Grey Cup champion (1962)

Bill Whisler (born November 15, 1940) was an American professional football player who played for the Winnipeg Blue Bombers, BC Lions and Montreal Alouettes. He won the Grey Cup with them in 1962. He played college football at the University of Iowa. Whisler was drafted in the 1962 NFL draft by the Washington Redskins in the 13th round. He was a late cut from the 1962 team. He is a member of the South Dakota Sports Hall of Fame and Winnipeg Blue Bombers Hall of Fame.
