= Jim Worden (halfback) =

No. 21
- Position: Halfback

Personal information
- Born: June 21, 1915; Lorain, Ohio, U.S.
- Died: June 7, 1983 (aged 67); Lorain, Ohio, U.S.
- Listed height: 5 ft 10 in (1.78 m)
- Listed weight: 180 lb (82 kg)

Career information
- High school: Lorain (Ohio)
- College: Waynesburg (1934–1937)
- NFL draft: 1938: undrafted

Career history
- Cleveland Rams (1945)

Awards and highlights
- NFL champion (1945)
- Stats at Pro Football Reference

James Crawford Worden (June 21, 1915 – June 7, 1983) was an American professional football halfback who played for the Cleveland Rams of the National Football League (NFL). He played college football at Waynesburg College.

== Early life and college ==
James Crawford Worden was born on June 21, 1915, in Lorain, Ohio. He attended Lorain High School in Lorain.

Worden was a member of the Waynesburg Yellow Jackets of Waynesburg College from 1934 to 1937.

== Professional career ==
Worden signed with the Cleveland Rams of the National Football League (NFL) on August 18, 1945, at the age of 30. He played in five games for the Rams during the 1945 season, rushing four times for three yards. On December 16, 1945, the Rams beat the Washington Redskins in the 1945 NFL Championship Game by a score of 15–14. Worden did not play in the game.

== Personal life ==
Worden was the father of Canadian Football League player Jim Worden. He died on June 7, 1983, in Lorain.
