= Wayne Shaw (linebacker) =

Canadian football linebacker (born 1939)

Profile
- Position: Linebacker

Personal information
- Born: 1939 (age 86–87); Bladworth, Saskatchewan, Canada
- Listed height: 6 ft 0 in (1.83 m)
- Listed weight: 210 lb (95 kg)

Career information
- High school: Athol Murray College of Notre Dame
- College: none

Career history
- 1961–1972: Saskatchewan Roughriders

Awards and highlights
- Grey Cup champion (1966); CFL All-Star (1967); 6× CFL West All-Star (1963, 1964, 1966, 1967, 1969, 1971); Plaza of Honor (1994)

Wayne Shaw (born 1939) is a retired outside linebacker who played twelve seasons for the Saskatchewan Roughriders of the Canadian Football League.

He is the brother of former Canadian football linebacker Cliff Shaw.

== Early life ==
Educated at Athol Murray College of Notre Dame, Shaw played football for The Notre Dame Hounds and Saskatoon Hilltops before joining the Roughriders in 1961.

== Professional career ==
Wayne Shaw was a 6-time Western Division all-star player at the linebacker position. Shaw helped the Roughriders win the 54th Grey Cup of 1966 by a score of 29-14. He also played in the 55th Grey Cup of 1967 and the 57th Grey Cup of 1969, losses to the Hamilton Tiger-Cats and Ottawa Rough Riders.

== Post-football ==
After his football career, Shaw ran a retail store in Winnipeg, Manitoba for 10 years. He returned to Saskatchewan where he owned and operated a bookstore in Saskatoon up to his retirement in 2009, at which time he donated thousands of books to the Athol Murray College of Notre Dame.
