= John LaGrone =

American football player and judge (1944–2022)

Profile
- Position: Defensive tackle

Personal information
- Born: November 4, 1944; Borger, Texas, U.S.
- Died: March 27, 2022 (aged 77); Fritch, Texas, U.S.
- Listed height: 5 ft 10 in (1.78 m)
- Listed weight: 235 lb (107 kg)

Career information
- College: Southern Methodist

Career history
- 1967–1974: Edmonton Eskimos

Awards and highlights
- DeMarco-Becket Memorial Trophy (1969); CFL Most Outstanding Lineman (1969); 2× CFL All-Star (1968, 1969); 6× CFL West All-Star (1967, 1968, 1969, 1971, 1972, 1973); Edmonton Eskimos Wall of Honour (1988); Consensus All-American (1966); 3× First-team All-SWC (1964, 1965, 1966)

John Wesley LaGrone III (November 4, 1944 – March 27, 2022) was an American professional gridiron football player who played for the Canadian Football League (CFL)'s Edmonton Eskimos.

== CFL ==
After playing college football at Southern Methodist University, where he was an All-American, LaGrone spent his entire eight-year CFL career from 1967 to 1974 as a defensive tackle. He was named a Western Conference All-Star six times, a CFL All-Star twice, and won the CFL's Most Outstanding Lineman Award in 1969.

The Eskimos never won a Grey Cup during his time with them, losing twice under head coach Ray Jauch, the 61st Grey Cup of 1973 and the 62nd Grey Cup of 1974, to Ottawa and Montreal respectively.

== Post-football ==
Since 1990, LaGrone served as a judge in Hutchinson County, Texas. He died on March 27, 2022, in Fritch, Texas, aged 77.
