= Ken Sugarman =

American gridiron football player (born 1942)

Profile
- Position: Offensive tackle

Personal information
- Born: June 16, 1942 (age 84)
- Listed height: 6 ft 3 in (1.91 m)
- Listed weight: 250 lb (113 kg)

Career information
- College: Whitworth
- NFL draft: 1964: 7th round, 92nd overall pick

Career history
- 1964–1972: BC Lions

Awards and highlights
- Grey Cup champion (1964); CFL All-Star (1970); 4× CFL West All-Star (1968, 1969, 1970, 1971)

Ken Sugarman (born June 16, 1942) is a former professional Canadian football player with the Canadian Football League (CFL)'s the British Columbia Lions. After playing college football at Whitworth College, Sugarman spent his entire 9-year CFL career as an offensive lineman for the Lions. He was named CFL All-Star in 1970, and was a part of the Lions Grey Cup victory in 1964.
