= Lanny Boleski =

Canadian gridiron football player

No. 63
- Position: Offensive tackle

Personal information
- Born: 1941; Red Deer, Alberta, Canada
- Died: Feb 22, 1997
- Listed height: 6 ft 4 in (1.93 m)
- Listed weight: 250 lb (113 kg)

Career information
- High school: Squamish, BC
- College: Wyoming

Career history
- 1965–1973: Calgary Stampeders
- 1974: BC Lions

Awards and highlights
- Grey Cup champion (1971); 2× CFL West All-Star (1969, 1970)

Lanny Boleski (born ca. 1941, full name Anthony Landell Boleski) was a former professional Canadian football player with the Canadian Football League's Calgary Stampeders and the British Columbia Lions. After playing college football at the University of Wyoming, Boleski spent his entire 10-year CFL career as an offensive lineman for the Stampeders and Lions. He was named CFL West All-Star in 1969 and 1970, and was a part of the Stampeders Grey Cup victory in 1971.

Lanny Boleski left behind his children: Sarah Boleski, Robin Boleski, Anthony Nielson, Cale Boleski, Dylan Boleski, step daughter Kerry Coates (Ross) and wife Jeannette Sarrasin. After the CFL he became a jack of all trades working in many fields. For more than 10 years he found his calling as an English teacher in many areas of Saskatchewan. He spent his summers on extensive road trips throughout all of Canada a parts of the US with his wife and children.
