= Marshall Shirk =

American gridiron football player (born 1940)

Profile
- Position: Defensive tackle

Personal information
- Born: August 3, 1940 (age 86); Los Angeles County, California, U.S.
- Listed height: 6 ft 2 in (1.88 m)
- Listed weight: 245 lb (111 kg)

Career information
- College: UCLA
- NFL draft: 1962: 9th round, 114th overall pick
- AFL draft: 1962: 9th round, 67th overall pick

Career history
- 1965–1971: Ottawa Rough Riders

Awards and highlights
- Grey Cup champion (1968, 1969)

Marshall Chester Shirk (born August 3, 1940) was an American professional Canadian football player who played for the Ottawa Rough Riders. He won the Grey Cup in 1968 and 1969. He previously played college football at the University of California, Los Angeles.
