= Ken Nielsen =

Canadian football player (1942–2025)

Profile
- Position: Wide receiver

Personal information
- Born: May 10, 1942; Hanna, Alberta, Canada
- Died: November 17, 2025 (aged 83)
- Listed height: 6 ft 1 in (1.85 m)
- Listed weight: 180 lb (82 kg)

Career information
- University: Alberta

Career history
- 1965: Hamilton Tiger-Cats
- 1965–1970: Winnipeg Blue Bombers

Awards and highlights
- Most Outstanding Canadian (1968); Dr. Beattie Martin Trophy (1968); 2× CFL All-Star (1968, 1969); 3× CFL West All-Star (1967, 1968, 1969)

Ken Nielsen (May 10, 1942 – November 17, 2025) was a Canadian football wide receiver for the Winnipeg Blue Bombers of the Canadian Football League (CFL) from 1965 to 1970. Nielsen won the CFL's Most Outstanding Canadian Award in 1968.

== College football ==
Nielsen played Canadian university football at the University of Alberta.

== Winnipeg ==
Though drafted by the Hamilton Tiger-Cats, Ken Nielsen was traded that same year to Winnipeg. Ken Nielsen became a standout wide receiver for the Winnipeg Blue Bombers from 1965 to 1970. In the 1965 Western conference playoffs, Nielsen caught a 109-yard touchdown pass from Ken Ploen which beat the Calgary Stampeders and helped send Winnipeg to the 53rd Grey Cup game. But the Blue Bombers lost that game to the Hamilton Tiger-Cats, the so-called "Wind Bowl", when weather conditions were terrible for passing, punting, and place kicking.

During training camp in 1970, after only five seasons, Nielsen suffered a serious neck injury which cut short his career. He caught 280 passes for 4,340 yards.

== After football ==
Nielsen worked as a dentist in Winnipeg and retired to Kamloops, BC. He had four children and thirteen grandchildren.

Nielsen died on November 17, 2025, at the age of 83.
