= Bob LaRose =

Canadian football player (1946–2022)

Profile
- Position: Wide receiver

Personal information
- Born: March 6, 1946
- Died: April 25, 2022 (aged 76)
- Listed height: 6 ft 3 in (1.91 m)
- Listed weight: 215 lb (98 kg)

Career information
- University: Western Ontario

Career history
- 1970–1977: Winnipeg Blue Bombers

Awards and highlights
- CFL West All-Star (1971)

Bob LaRose (March 6, 1946 – April 25, 2022) was a Canadian professional football player who played professionally for the Winnipeg Blue Bombers.
