= Jim Tomlin =

Canadian football player (born 1945)

New Orleans Saints (1968), Toronto Argonauts (1968), Denver Broncos (1974)
- Position: Defensive back
- CFL status: American

Personal information
- Born: December 6, 1945 (age 80); McAllen, Texas, U.S.
- Listed height: 5 ft 10 in (1.78 m)
- Listed weight: 187 lb (85 kg)

Career information
- High school: McAllen (McAllen, Texas)
- College: Stephen F. Austin

Career history
- 1969–1970: Toronto Argonauts
- 1971: BC Lions

Awards and highlights
- CFL East All-Star (1970)

Jim Tomlin (born June 12, 1945) is a Canadian football player who played professionally for the Toronto Argonauts and BC Lions. Jim Tomlin had an outstanding career in College Football and Track at Stephen F. Austin. As a 9.3 Sprinter and a Tailback. Jim was drafted as a free agent by the New Orleans Saints in 1968. After the ‘68 season, Jim asked to be traded to the Toronto Argonauts. Jim had an All-Pro career with the Argonauts. He was clocked at 4.21 in the 40 yard dash. He is still considered the fastest player in the CFL history. Jim was traded to Denver Broncos in 1974. He retired from Pro Football after the ‘74 season.
