= Bob Kosid =

Canadian football player (1942–2025)

Profile
- Position: Defensive back

Personal information
- Born: February 27, 1942; Brandon, Manitoba, Canada
- Died: July 20, 2025 (aged 83); Hamilton, Ontario, Canada
- Listed height: 5 ft 10 in (1.78 m)
- Listed weight: 185 lb (84 kg)

Career history
- 1964–1972: Saskatchewan Roughriders

Awards and highlights
- Grey Cup champion (1966)

Robert Lee Kosid (February 27, 1942 – July 20, 2025) was a Canadian football player who played for the Saskatchewan Roughriders. He won the Grey Cup with Saskatchewan in 1966. He was an alumnus of the University of Kentucky.
