= Dave Raimey =

American football player (born 1940)

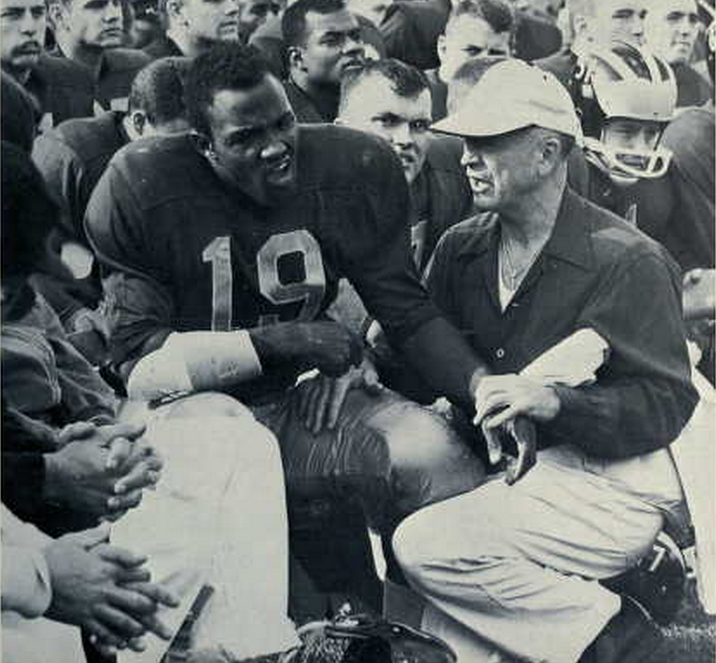

No. 26, 25, 27, 14
- Positions: Defensive back, Running back

Personal information
- Born: November 18, 1940 (age 85); Dayton, Ohio, U.S.
- Listed height: 5 ft 10 in (1.78 m)
- Listed weight: 195 lb (88 kg)

Career information
- High school: Roosevelt (Dayton)
- College: Michigan (1959–1962)
- NFL draft: 1963: 9th round, 121st overall pick

Career history
- Cleveland Browns (1964); Winnipeg Blue Bombers (1965–1969); Toronto Argonauts (1969–1974)

Awards and highlights
- NFL champion (1964); 2× CFL All-Star (1966, 1969); 4× CFL Western All-Star (1965–1968); CFL Eastern All-Star (1969); Second-team All-Big Ten (1961)
- Stats at Pro Football Reference
- Canadian Football Hall of Fame

David E. Raimey (born November 18, 1940) is an American former professional football player in the National Football League (NFL) and Canadian Football League (CFL).

A native of Dayton, Ohio, Raimey twice won state championships in the low hurdles and long jump. He played college football as a halfback and defensive back for the Michigan Wolverines and was the team's leading scorer for three consecutive years from 1960 to 1962.

Raimey played professional football from 1964 to 1974, including stints as a defensive back for the Cleveland Browns in 1964, as a running back in the Canadian Football League (CFL) for the Winnipeg Blue Bombers (1965-1968), and as a defensive back for the Toronto Argonauts (1969-1974). He rushed for over 1,000 yards in 1965 and 1966 and was selected as a CFL all-star in 1966 and 1969. He also played in two Grey Cup championship games, one for the Blue Bombers and one for the Argonauts. He was inducted into the Canadian Football Hall of Fame in 2000.

== Early life ==
Raimey was born in 1940 in Dayton, Ohio. He and three brothers were orphaned due to his mother succumbing to tuberculosis at an early age and were raised by their grandparents. When his grandmother became seriously ill, they moved to a segregated orphanage.

Raimey initially attended Roosevelt High School in Dayton. He was big for his age, and the football coaches wanted him to play on the line. Raimey recalled that he "wanted no part of that line business" and so he did not play football that year. He remained at Roosevelt for his freshman year and the first semester of his sophomore year. He then transferred Woodrow Wilson High School in Xenia, Ohio. He played football at the fullback and halfback positions. As a senior, he began his season at Wilson and then transferred back to Roosevelt in mid-October. He scored 19 touchdowns that year.

Raimey also starred in track in high school. He led Wilson to the Ohio Class A track championship in 1958, placing first in the broad jump and 180-yard low hurdles. He also finished second in the 100-yard dash and as the anchor the school's 880-yard relay team. He repeated in 1959 as state champion in the broad jump and low hurdles. In April 1959, he received the Agonis Award as Dayton's outstanding high school athlete.

== University of Michigan ==
Raimey enrolled at the University of Michigan in 1959 and played for the Wolverines football teams from 1960 to 1962. As a sophomore in 1960, Raimey started three games at the halfback position, gained 342 net rushing yards in 62 attempts, and led the team in scoring with six touchdowns.

=== 1961 season ===
As a junior in 1961, Raimey helped lead Michigan to a 6–3 record, starting all nine games at right halfback. He played on offense, defense, and on special teams as a return specialist. Against Duke on November 4, Raimey played 40 out of a possible 60 minutes. Head coach Bump Elliott noted: "I don't believe people know how well Dave plays on defense. Whenever things get tough for us, I've got him in there." Against Ohio State on November 25, he returned a kickoff 90 yards for a touchdown. For the season, he led Michigan with 496 rushing yards on 99 attempts and was the team's leading scorer for the second consecutive year with six touchdowns.

=== 1962 season ===
As a senior in 1962, Raimey played for one of the worst teams in Michigan football history, a team that compiled a 2–7 record, scored only 70 points for the season, and finished last in the Big Ten. The Michigan Daily wrote that nobody blamed Raimey for the "impotent Michigan offense", noting that he played against defenses stacked to stop him and was nevertheless responsible for two-thirds of the team's touchdowns. The Daily further noted that Raimey had a "rare combination of power and speed to make him a breakaway threat from any point on the field."

Raimey led the Wolverines in rushing in 1962, gaining 385 yards and scoring five touchdowns on 124 carries. He was also selected by his teammates as the team's most valuable player for the 1962 season. He finished his college career with more touchdowns than any Michigan player since Tom Harmon.

Raimey played the 1962 season with a harness over his shoulders to protect an injury that was diagnosed as bone chips. After the season ended, he underwent surgery to remove the chips.

== Professional football ==
=== 1963 and 1964 seasons ===
Raimey was selected in the ninth round of the 1963 NFL draft by the Cleveland Browns. He turned down an offer from the Browns, instead signing with the Winnipeg Blue Bombers of the Canadian Football League for a $5,000 bonus and a three-year contract. He suffered a recurrence of his prior shoulder injury and underwent surgery in the spring. After spending time on Winnipeg's injured list, Raimey was cut by the club in September 1963.

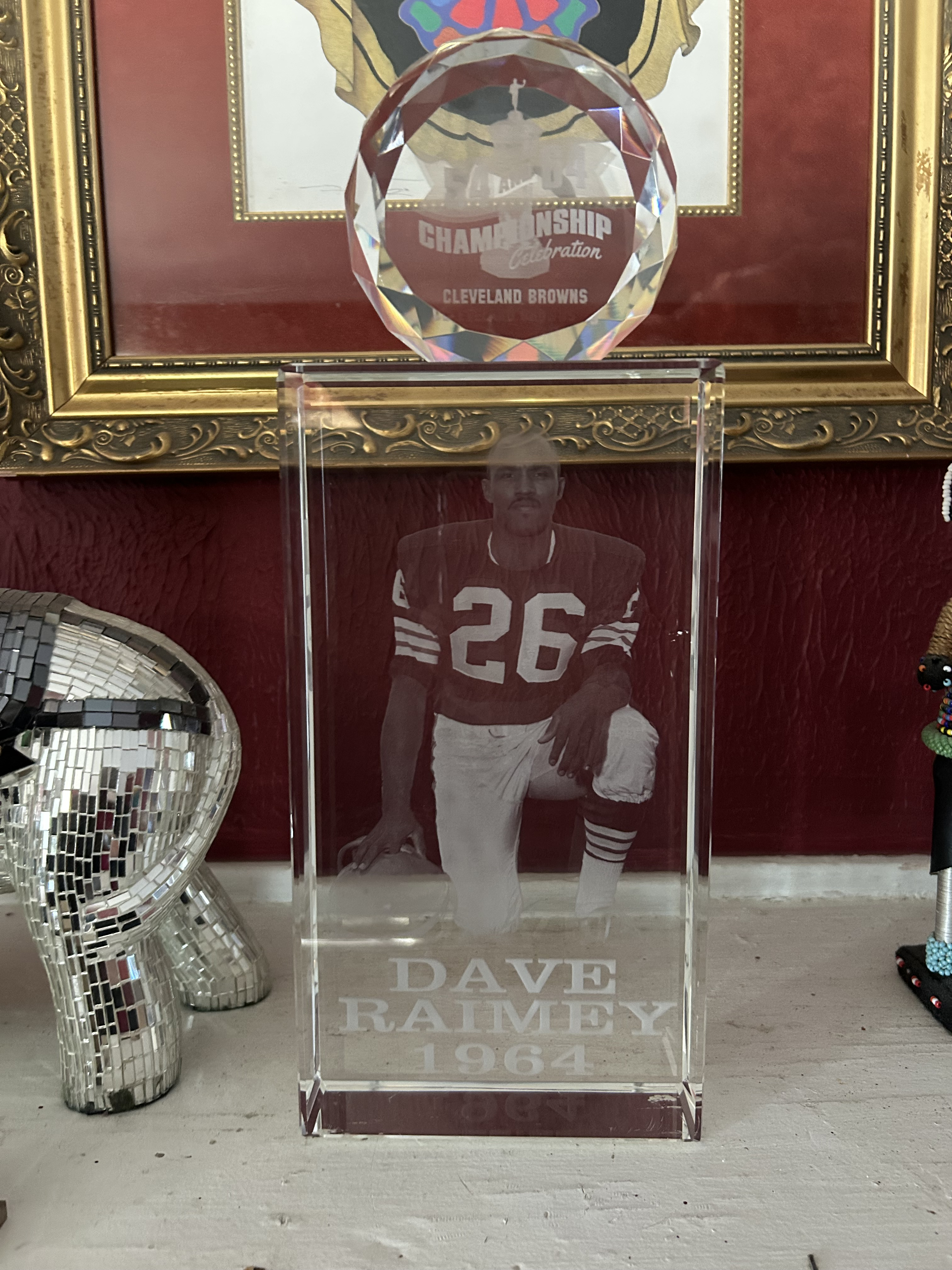

In October 1963, he signed a contract to play for the Browns in 1964. He undertook an isometric training program to strengthen his shoulders and made the final cuts with the Browns in 1964. He appeared in five games during the 1964 NFL season, mostly on defense at cornerback and safety. He was placed on waivers in late November.

=== Winnipeg Blue Bombers (1965–1969) ===
Raimey signed with Winnipeg in March 1965. During the 1965 season, he returned to the offensive halfback position, appearing in 16 games and tallying 1,052 rushing yards on 130 carries for an average of 8.1 yards per carry. He also caught 20 passes for 218 yards and returned 22 kickoffs for 635 yards, including a 105-yard return. Columnist Don Blanchard of the Winnipeg Free Press wrote in August 1965 that Raimey was "operating like the best halfback in the league" since Leo Lewis a decade earlier. He helped lead Winnipeg to a league-best record of 14–2. In the 1965 Western Conference semifinal, he scored both Winnipeg touchdowns on runs of 90 and 25 yards. The team advanced to the 1965 Grey Cup game, known as the "Wind Bowl", where they lost to the Hamilton Tiger-Cats. Raimey was also selected as a Western Conference offensive all-star.

Raimey returned to the Blue Bombers in 1966. He again appeared in all 16 games for the team, tallying a career-high 1,223 rushing yards on 188 carries for an average of 6.5 yards per carry. He also caught 28 passes for 389 yards and returned 21 kickoffs for 474 yards. At the end of the season, he was selected as a CFL offensive all-star; he also received the Blue Bombers' Most Outstanding Player award.

In 1967, Raimey appeared in 15 games for Winnipeg. He totaled 773 rushing yards on 125 carries (6.2 yards per carry), caught 39 passes for 470 yards and four touchdowns, and returned 29 kickoffs for 744 yards (25.7 yard average). He was again selected as a Western Conference All-Star.

In 1968, Raimey appeared in 16 games for the Blue Bombers. He totaled 781 rushing yards, 559 receiving yards, and 930 yards on kickoff returns. His total of 2,278 all-purpose yards was a career high, and he was selected as a Western Conference all-star for the fourth consecutive season. He was also selected for the second time as the Blue Bombers' Most Outstanding Player.

In July 1969, during a practice session, Raimey had an angry "exchange of words" with Winnipeg quarterback John Schneider. Schneider "rifled" a pass at Raimey, and the exchange of words continued, and Raimey was sent home. A short time later, Raimey was traded to the Toronto Argonauts in exchange for another former Michigan player, Wally Gabler.

=== Toronto Argonauts (1969–1975) ===
Raimey appeared in three games for Winnipeg and nine for Toronto during the 1969 season. His season ended in late October when he tore ligaments in his left leg during a game against Hamilton. For the 1969 season, he tallied 829 rushing yards. Despite limited playing time, Raimmey was selected as a CFL all-star in 1969.

In June 1970, Toronto team physicians declared Raimmey's knee fit, but he reported that it still hurt and even rattled at times. He appeared in 14 games during the 1970 season, tallying 839 rushing yards on 142 carries (5.9 yards per carry).

Raimey went through an intensive training program prior to the 1971 season. In June 1971, the Argonauts moved him to the defensive back position. He remained at the defensive back position for the remainder of his career through the 1974 season. Raimey suffered a knee injury late in the 1974 season. He underwent surgery and was expected to return to the Argonauts in 1975. Instead, in June 1975, Raimey announced his retirement. He attempted a comeback, but his knee did not hold up after three days of workouts, and he renewed his retirement.

Over his 10-year career, six at running back, Raimey rushed for 5,528 yards and 25 touchdowns on 883 carries for a 6.3 yard per rush average. He also intercepted 15 passes, two of which he returned for touchdowns.

== Personal life and later years ==
Raimey married Marlena Price in the fall of 1962. His grandchildren Aden and Mila Holloway are both college basketball players.

Raimey was inducted into the Winnipeg Blue Bombers Hall of Fame in 1989. In February 2000, he was selected for the Canadian Football Hall of Fame. He was inducted in September 2000 at age 59. As of December 2000, Raimey was living in Dayton, Ohio, where he was renovating a storefront in the city's Wright-Dunbar Historic District.
