= Herm Harrison =

American gridiron football player (1939–2013)

No. 76
- Position: Tight end

Personal information
- Born: September 29, 1939
- Died: November 2, 2013 (aged 74); Calgary, Alberta, Canada
- Listed height: 6 ft 3 in (1.91 m)
- Listed weight: 210 lb (95 kg)

Career information
- College: Arizona State

Career history
- 1964–1972: Calgary Stampeders

Awards and highlights
- Grey Cup champion (1971); 3× CFL All-Star (1968, 1969, 1970); 6× CFL West All-Star (1965, 1967–1971)
- Canadian Football Hall of Fame (Class of 1993)

Herman Austin "Ham Hands" Harrison (September 29, 1939 – November 2, 2013) was a tight end with the Calgary Stampeders from 1964 to 1972.

== College career ==
Herm Harrison played college football at Arizona State University.

== Professional career ==
Harrison came to the Calgary Stampeders in 1964 as a linebacker, but was converted to tight end . At that position, Harrison became a Western conference all-star 6 times (1965, 1967–1971) and CFL-All Star 3 times (1968, 1969, 1970). In 1968, he led the CFL with 1,306 yards receiving. In 1969 and 1970, Harrison led the Western conference in pass receptions with 68 and 70, respectively, and tied for the lead in 1971 with 70 catches.

Calgary won the 59th Grey Cup of 1971 over the Toronto Argonauts on a wet field. Harrison scored the only touchdown for the Stampeders that day, a 14-yard pass from Keeling in a 14–11 victory. The Stampeders also won the 1968 and 1970 Western Finals but lost the 56th Grey Cup to the Ottawa Rough Riders and the 58th Grey Cup to the Montreal Alouettes.

== Post-football honors ==
For his pass catching and blocking abilities as one of the premier tight ends of his era, Harrison was inducted into the Canadian Football Hall of Fame in 1993 and his number (No. 76) retired as a member of Calgary.
