= Ted Urness =

Canadian gridiron football player (1937–2018)

No. 43
- Position: Center

Personal information
- Born: June 23, 1937; Regina, Saskatchewan, Canada
- Died: December 29, 2018 (aged 81); Saskatoon, Saskatchewan, Canada
- Listed height: 6 ft 3 in (1.91 m)
- Listed weight: 225 lb (102 kg)

Career information
- College: Arizona

Career history
- 1961–1970: Saskatchewan Roughriders

Awards and highlights
- Grey Cup champion (1966); 6× CFL All-Star (1965–1970); 6× CFL West All-Star (1965–1970)
- Canadian Football Hall of Fame (Class of 1989)

Harold Edwards Urness (June 23, 1937 – December 29, 2018) was an offensive lineman for the Saskatchewan Roughriders from 1961 to 1970.

== CFL career ==
Urness played in three Grey Cups for the Roughriders, winning one in 1966, the 54th Grey Cup against the Ottawa Rough Riders, losing two, the 55th Grey Cup of 1967 against the Hamilton Tiger-Cats, and the 57th Grey Cup of 1969 against Ottawa again. Except for his rookie year, he and the Roughriders never missed the playoffs. Urness was an All-Star centre six years in a row and was inducted into the Canadian Football Hall of Fame in 1989. He was the runner-up for the CFL's Most Outstanding Lineman Award in 1968.

== Personal life ==
Al Urness, Ted's father, spent seven seasons with the then-Regina Roughriders. Beginning in 1928, he played for the team in five consecutive Grey Cup games. Al's brother, Harold Urness, played for the Riders in 1930 and 1931. Fred Goodman, Ted's uncle, was a member of the Roughriders from 1929 to 1933. Jack Urness, Ted's brother, was a quarterback with the Roughriders of 1958 and 1959. On November 26, 1989, Ted and his son Mark Urness (5 years with the Riders) became the team's first father-son Grey Cup championship duo.

After football, Ted served as the chairman for the Saskatchewan Liquor Control Board, and long-serving General Manager for Redhead Equipment in Saskatoon. He died on December 29, 2018, at the age of 81.
