= Rich Robinson (Canadian football) =

Canadian football player

Profile
- Position: Defensive back

Personal information
- Born: c. 1946 (age 79–80)
- Listed height: 5 ft 10 in (1.78 m)
- Listed weight: 175 lb (79 kg)

Career information
- College: Miami (Florida)

Career history
- 1968–1970: BC Lions

Awards and highlights
- CFL West All-Star (1969)

Richard Robinson (born c. 1946) is a Canadian football player who played professionally for the BC Lions.
