= Ken Lehmann =

American gridiron football player (born 1942)

Profile
- Position: Linebacker

Personal information
- Born: January 13, 1942 (age 84); Louisville, Kentucky, U.S.
- Listed height: 5 ft 11 in (1.80 m)
- Listed weight: 220 lb (100 kg)

Career information
- College: Xavier

Career history
- 1964–1971: Ottawa Rough Riders
- 1972: BC Lions

Awards and highlights
- 2× Grey Cup champion (1968, 1969); CFL's Most Outstanding Lineman Award (1968); 4× CFL All-Star (1965, 1966, 1968, 1969); 5× CFL East All-Star (1965–1969)
- Canadian Football Hall of Fame (Class of 2011)

Kenneth E. Lehmann (born January 13, 1942) is an American former professional football linebacker for the Ottawa Rough Riders and BC Lions of the Canadian Football League (CFL) from 1964 to 1972. He was a CFL All-Star from 1965 to 1969 and was a part of two Grey Cup victories for the Rough Riders, in 1968 and 1969.

== College ==
Lehmann graduated with an Economics degree from Xavier University in Cincinnati, Ohio.

== Ottawa ==
Lehmann played middle linebacker for the Ottawa Rough Riders from 1964 to 1971. A mainstay of the Ottawa defense, Lehmann participated in a total of three Grey Cup games with the Rough Riders, winning back to back championships 1968 and 1969 and losing one in 1966.

In 1965, Lehmann won the Hiram Walker Trophy and was selected to the Eastern Football Conference All Star Team. Lehmann was chosen as an Eastern All-Star five times throughout his career and All-Canadian four times. In 1966, Lehmann was the Eastern finalist for the Schenleys Most Outstanding Linemen Award and subsequently won the award in 1968. In 1968, Lehmann was named CFL Lineman of the Year. He remains tied for the CFL record for the most blocked punts by a player in a game with 2.

== Post-football honors ==
Lehmann was inducted into the Canadian Football Hall of Fame in 2011. The city of Ottawa declared Sunday, October 23, 2011, Ken Lehmann day to honour Ken's contribution to football in Ottawa.

== Video clips ==
Canadian Football Hall of Fame member on YouTube
