= Charlie Parker (Canadian football) =

American gridiron football player (born 1941)

Profile
- Position: Guard

Personal information
- Born: June 19, 1941 (age 85); Greenville, Alabama, US
- Listed height: 6 ft 0 in (1.83 m)
- Listed weight: 246 lb (112 kg)

Career information
- High school: Mattie T. Blount
- College: Southern Mississippi

Career history
- 1967–1969: Montreal Alouettes

Awards and highlights
- CFL East All-Star (1968)
- Stats at Pro Football Reference

Charles Ruffing Parker (born June 19, 1941) is an American-born Canadian football player who played professionally for the Montreal Alouettes.
