= 1971 CFL season =

Canadian Football League season

- East champions: Toronto Argonauts
- West champions: Calgary Stampeders

59th Grey Cup
- Champions: Calgary Stampeders

CFL seasons
- 1970 1972

Canadian Football League team locations: West, East

The 1971 CFL season is considered to be the 18th season in modern-day Canadian football, although it was officially the 14th Canadian Football League season.

== CFL News for 1971 ==
The Grey Cup Championship was played on artificial turf for the first time in Vancouver. The BC Lions also wore special "CCC"-logo helmets to commemorate the Canadian Confederation Centennial of British Columbia, the province having entered into Canadian Confederation a hundred years earlier, in 1871. The flower in the centre of the "CCC" logo is the pacific dogwood, the official provincial flower of British Columbia.

All CFL teams had their player's last names appearing on the jersey backs (at shoulder height, above the back number) beginning this season.

This would be the last year until 2006 that the Edmonton Eskimos would miss the playoffs; in the intervening years, they would reach the playoffs for 33 straight years.

== Regular season standings ==
West Division
Pos	Team	Pld	W	L	T	PF	PA	PD	Pts
1	Calgary Stampeders (C, Q)	16	9	6	1	290	218	+72	19
2	Saskatchewan Roughriders (Q)	16	9	6	1	347	316	+31	19
3	Winnipeg Blue Bombers (Q)	16	7	8	1	366	349	+17	15
4	BC Lions	16	6	9	1	282	363	−81	13
5	Edmonton Eskimos	16	6	10	0	237	305	−68	12

(C) First round bye; (Q) Qualified for playoffs

East Division
Pos	Team	Pld	W	L	T	PF	PA	PD	Pts
1	Toronto Argonauts (C, Q)	14	10	4	0	289	248	+41	20
2	Hamilton Tiger-Cats (Q)	14	7	7	0	242	246	−4	14
3	Ottawa Rough Riders (Q)	14	6	8	0	291	277	+14	12
4	Montreal Alouettes	14	6	8	0	226	248	−22	12

(C) First round bye; (Q) Qualified for playoffs

Calgary and Toronto had first round byes.

== 1971 Grey Cup Playoffs ==
=== Conference Semi-Finals ===
Western Semi-Finals
Winnipeg Blue Bombers @ Saskatchewan Roughriders
Date	Away	Home
November 6	Winnipeg Blue Bombers 23	Saskatchewan Roughriders 34

Eastern Semi-Finals
Ottawa Rough Riders @ Hamilton Tiger-Cats
Date	Away	Home
November 7	Ottawa Rough Riders 4	Hamilton Tiger-Cats 23

=== Conference Finals ===
Western Finals
Saskatchewan Roughriders vs Calgary Stampeders
Game	Date	Away	Home
1	November 13	Saskatchewan Roughriders 21	Calgary Stampeders 30
2	November 17	Calgary Stampeders 23	Saskatchewan Roughriders 21
Calgary won best-of-three series 2–0

Eastern Finals
Toronto Argonauts vs Hamilton Tiger-Cats
Game	Date	Away	Home
1	November 14	Toronto Argonauts 23	Hamilton Tiger-Cats 8
2	November 20	Hamilton Tiger-Cats 17	Toronto Argonauts 17
Toronto won two-game total-point series 40–25

== Playoff bracket ==
Division Semifinals
East
E2	Hamilton Tiger Cats	23
E3	Ottawa Rough Riders	4
West
W2	Saskatchewan Roughriders	34
W3	Winnipeg Blue Bombers	23

Division Finals
E1	Toronto Argonauts	40 (23+17)
E2	Hamilton Tiger Cats	25 (8+17)
W1	Calgary Stampeders	2 (30,23)
W2	Saskatchewan Roughriders	0 (21,21)

59th Grey Cup
E1	Toronto Argonauts	11
W1	Calgary Stampeders	14

=== Grey Cup Championship ===
November 28 59th Annual Grey Cup Game: Empire Stadium – Vancouver, British Columbia
Western Champion	Eastern Champion
Calgary Stampeders 14	Toronto Argonauts 11
The Calgary Stampeders were 1971 Grey Cup Champions
Wayne Harris (LB), Calgary Stampeders – Grey Cup Most Valuable Player; Dick Suderman (DE), Calgary Stampeders – Grey Cup Most Valuable Canadian

== 1971 CFL All-Stars ==
=== Offence ===
- QB – Don Jonas, Winnipeg Blue Bombers
- RB – George Reed, Saskatchewan Roughriders
- RB – Jim Evenson, BC Lions
- RB – Leon McQuay, Toronto Argonauts
- TE – Mel Profit, Toronto Argonauts
- SE – Jim Thorpe, Winnipeg Blue Bombers
- WR – Bob LaRose, Winnipeg Blue Bombers
- C – Bob Swift, Winnipeg Blue Bombers
- OG – Jack Abendschan, Saskatchewan Roughriders
- OG – Granville Liggins, Calgary Stampeders
- OT – Bill Frank, Winnipeg Blue Bombers
- OT – Ed George, Montreal Alouettes

=== Defence ===
- DT – John Helton, Calgary Stampeders
- DT – Jim Stillwagon, Toronto Argonauts
- DE – Jim Corrigall, Toronto Argonauts
- DE – Craig Koinzan, Calgary Stampeders
- LB – Wayne Harris, Calgary Stampeders
- LB – Mark Kosmos, Montreal Alouettes
- LB – Jerry Campbell, Ottawa Rough Riders
- DB – Dick Dupuis, Edmonton Eskimos
- DB – Frank Andruski, Calgary Stampeders
- DB – Garney Henley, Hamilton Tiger-Cats
- DB – Marv Luster, Toronto Argonauts
- DB – Dick Thornton, Toronto Argonauts

== 1971 Eastern All-Stars ==
=== Offence ===
- QB – Joe Theismann, Toronto Argonauts
- RB – Dennis Duncan, Ottawa Rough Riders
- RB – Bruce Van Ness, Montreal Alouettes
- RB – Leon McQuay, Toronto Argonauts
- TE – Mel Profit, Toronto Argonauts
- SE – Terry Evanshen, Montreal Alouettes
- WR – Mike Eben, Toronto Argonauts
- C – Paul Desjardins, Toronto Argonauts
- OG – Charlie Bray, Toronto Argonauts
- OG – Justin Canale, Montreal Alouettes
- OT – Ellison Kelly, Toronto Argonauts
- OT – Ed George, Montreal Alouettes

=== Defence ===
- DT – Rudy Sims, Ottawa Rough Riders
- DT – Jim Stillwagon, Toronto Argonauts
- DE – Jim Corrigall, Toronto Argonauts
- DE – Tom Laputka, Ottawa Rough Riders
- LB – Mike Blum, Hamilton Tiger-Cats
- LB – Mark Kosmos, Montreal Alouettes
- LB – Steve Smear, Montreal Alouettes
- DB – Johnny Williams, Hamilton Tiger-Cats
- DB – Gene Gaines, Montreal Alouettes
- DB – Garney Henley, Hamilton Tiger-Cats
- DB – Marv Luster, Toronto Argonauts
- DB – Dick Thornton, Toronto Argonauts

== 1971 Western All-Stars ==
=== Offence ===
- QB – Don Jonas, Winnipeg Blue Bombers
- RB – George Reed, Saskatchewan Roughriders
- RB – Jim Evenson, BC Lions
- RB – Mack Herron, Winnipeg Blue Bombers
- TE – Herm Harrison, Calgary Stampeders
- SE – Jim Thorpe, Winnipeg Blue Bombers
- WR – Bob LaRose, Winnipeg Blue Bombers
- C – Bob Swift, Winnipeg Blue Bombers
- C – Basil Bark, Calgary Stampeders
- OG – Jack Abendschan, Saskatchewan Roughriders
- OG – Granville Liggins, Calgary Stampeders
- OT – Bill Frank, Winnipeg Blue Bombers
- OT – Ken Sugarman, BC Lions

=== Defence ===
- DT – John Helton, Calgary Stampeders
- DT – John LaGrone, Edmonton Eskimos
- DE – Bill Baker, Saskatchewan Roughriders
- DE – Dick Suderman, Calgary Stampeders
- DE – Craig Koinzan, Calgary Stampeders
- LB – Wayne Harris, Calgary Stampeders
- LB – Dave Gasser, Edmonton Eskimos
- LB – Rob McLaren, Winnipeg Blue Bombers
- LB – Wayne Shaw, Saskatchewan Roughriders
- DB – Dick Dupuis, Edmonton Eskimos
- DB – Frank Andruski, Calgary Stampeders
- DB – Bruce Bennett, Saskatchewan Roughriders
- DB – Larry Robinson, Calgary Stampeders
- DB – Howard Starks, Calgary Stampeders

== 1971 CFL awards ==
- CFL's Most Outstanding Player Award – Don Jonas (QB), Winnipeg Blue Bombers
- CFL's Most Outstanding Canadian Award – Terry Evanshen (WR), Montreal Alouettes
- CFL's Most Outstanding Lineman Award – Wayne Harris (LB), Calgary Stampeders
- CFL's Coach of the Year – Leo Cahill, Toronto Argonauts
- Jeff Russel Memorial Trophy (Eastern MVP) – Mel Profit (TE), Toronto Argonauts
- Jeff Nicklin Memorial Trophy (Western MVP) - Don Jonas (QB), Winnipeg Blue Bombers
- Gruen Trophy (Eastern Rookie of the Year) - Jim Foley (SB), Montreal Alouettes
- Dr. Beattie Martin Trophy (Western Rookie of the Year) - Bob Kraemer (DB), Winnipeg Blue Bombers
- DeMarco–Becket Memorial Trophy (Western Outstanding Lineman) - Wayne Harris (LB), Calgary Stampeders
