= Clyde Brock =

American football player (born 1940)

No. 77, 75, 67
- Position: Offensive tackle

Personal information
- Born: August 30, 1940 (age 86); Los Angeles, California, U.S.
- Listed height: 6 ft 5 in (1.96 m)
- Listed weight: 278 lb (126 kg)

Career information
- High school: Ogden (Ogden, Utah)
- College: Utah State (1958-1961)
- NFL draft: 1962: 2nd round, 20th overall pick
- AFL draft: 1962: 8th round, 63rd overall pick

Career history
- Dallas Cowboys (1962–1963); San Francisco 49ers (1963); Saskatchewan Roughriders (1964–1975)

Awards and highlights
- Grey Cup champion (1966); 4× CFL All-Star (1966-1969); 5× CFL Western All-Star (1965-1969); Canadian Football Hall of Fame

Career NFL statistics
- Games played: 24
- Stats at Pro Football Reference

Career CFL statistics
- Games played: 169
- Canadian Football Hall of Fame

Clyde Vern Brock (born August 30, 1940) is an American former professional football player who was an offensive tackle in the Canadian Football League (CFL) for the Saskatchewan Roughriders. He also was a member of the Dallas Cowboys and San Francisco 49ers in the National Football League (NFL). He played college football for the Utah State Aggies. He is a member of the Canadian Football Hall of Fame.

== Early life ==
Brock attended Ogden High School before moving on to Utah State University, where he was a multi-sport athlete. He practiced football, basketball, baseball, wrestling and the shot put.

In football, he was a two-way tackle, playing behind Merlin Olsen and Clark Miller. Despite his large size, he was noted for having fast-moving feet and adjusting quickly for blocking routes.

Brock missed the 1961 inaugural Gotham Bowl against Baylor University. It was claimed that he signed a contract with a professional team before the game, and the school suspended him for the contest to avoid any possible sanctions by the NCAA. Baylor won the game 24–9. He was named honorable mention All-Skyline for the 1961 season.

== Professional career ==
=== Chicago Bears ===
Brock was selected by the Chicago Bears in the second round (20th overall) of the 1962 NFL draft and by the Houston Oilers in the eighth round (63rd overall) of the 1962 AFL draft.

Even though he was a reserve for most of his college career, he was chosen by the Bears because of his measurables and performance as a blocker. On August 30, he was waived after struggling in the Shrine game against the Green Bay Packers.

=== Dallas Cowboys ===
On September 2, 1962, the Dallas Cowboys claimed him off waivers. He was a reserve player on both offense and defense. In 1963, he focused on being a defensive tackle, before being released on October 14.

=== San Francisco 49ers ===
On October 16, 1963, he was claimed off waivers by the San Francisco 49ers. He was a backup offensive lineman that appeared in 6 games before being released on August 25, 1964.

=== Saskatchewan Roughriders ===
It was only when Brock got to the Saskatchewan Roughriders in 1964 that he became a standout at right offensive tackle, playing his entire career with the Green Riders. He received CFL All-Star recognition in 4 consecutive years, from 1966 to 1969.

He helped the franchise win its first Grey Cup championship in 1966, a 29–14 win over the Ottawa Rough Riders. He appeared in 159 games during his CFL career and retired after the 1975 season.

He was inducted into the Canadian Football Hall of Fame as a player in 2020.

== Personal life ==
His son Matt Brock also played in the National Football League.
