= Charlie Bray (gridiron football) =

American gridiron football player (born 1945)

Profile
- Position: Guard

Personal information
- Born: September 23, 1945 (age 81); Pittsburgh, Pennsylvania, U.S.
- Listed height: 6 ft 0 in (1.83 m)
- Listed weight: 255 lb (116 kg)

Career information
- High school: Pauls Valley (OK), Lincoln Prep (Kansas City, MO)
- College: Pratt CC, Central State (OK)

Career history
- Orlando Panthers (1966–1967); Toronto Argonauts (1968–1973); Memphis Southmen (1974); Hamilton Tiger Cats (1976)

Career statistics
- CFL games: 75
- WFL games: 31

Charlie Bray (born September 23, 1945) is an American former football offensive lineman. He played 11 years of professional football in the Continental Football League, Canadian Football League (CFL), and World Football League (WFL)

Bray was born in Pittsburgh in 1945 and grew up in Pauls Valley, Oklahoma. He played college football at Pratt Community College and Central State in Oklahoma. He began playing professional football in the Continental Football League as a defensive tackle, offensive guard, and middle linebacker for the Orlando Panthers during the 1966 and 1967 seasons.

In 1968, he joined the Canadian Football League (CFL), playing for the Toronto Argonauts from 1968 to 1973 and the Hamilton Tiger Cats in 1976. He appeared in 75 CFL games. He was named to the All-CFL team in 1969 and 1970.

Bray also played for the Memphis Southmen of the World Football League in 1974 and 1975. He appeared in 31 WFL games.
