= Phil Minnick =

American gridiron football player (born 1942)

Profile
- Position: Linebacker

Personal information
- Born: December 28, 1942 (age 83)
- Listed height: 6 ft 2 in (1.88 m)
- Listed weight: 230 lb (104 kg)

Career information
- College: Iowa State

Career history
- 1965–1973: Winnipeg Blue Bombers

Phil Minnick (born December 28, 1942) was an American professional football linebacker who played for the Winnipeg Blue Bombers. He played college football at the Iowa State University. As a rookie linebacker, he played in 14 games and intercepted one pass on a team that lost the 53rd Grey Cup. Minnick went on to play solid run defense and intercepted a total of 11 passes up to his final year in 1973. He was a CFL-West all-star in 1966 and 1968 and an All-CFL all star in 1968 and 1969, though during the latter year injuries curtailed him to playing only 9 games. A knee injury further limited him to playing only 1 game in 1970, none in 1971, and 8 in 1972, but he reached 15 games in his final year.
