= Jim Thorpe (Canadian football) =

American gridiron football player (1944–2020)

Profile
- Position: Wide receiver

Personal information
- Born: January 10, 1944; Manhasset, New York, U.S.
- Died: July 1, 2020 (aged 76); Glen Cove, New York, U.S.
- Listed height: 6 ft 2 in (1.88 m)
- Listed weight: 185 lb (84 kg)

Career information
- College: Hofstra

Career history
- 1969–1970: Toronto Argonauts
- 1970–1972: Winnipeg Blue Bombers

James A. Thorpe (January 10, 1944 – July 1, 2020) was an American-born Canadian football player who played for the Toronto Argonauts and Winnipeg Blue Bombers. He previously played football at Hofstra University.
