= Marv Luster =

American gridiron football player (1937–2020)

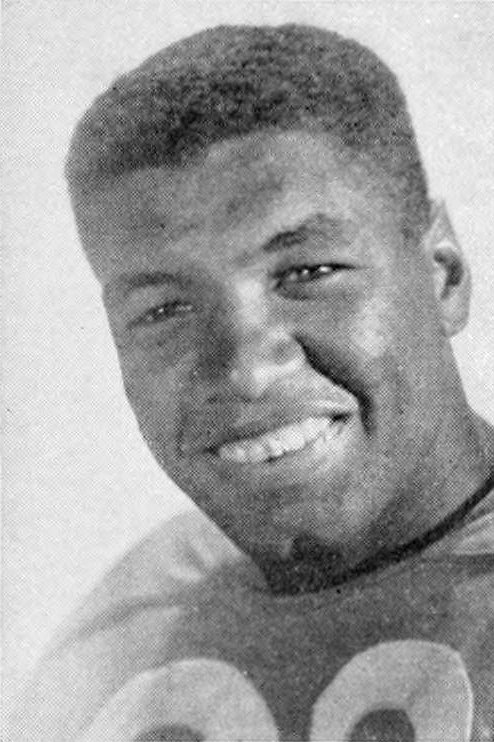
- Marv Luster at UCLA (1960)

Profile
- Positions: Defensive back, End

Personal information
- Born: November 27, 1937; Shreveport, Louisiana, U.S.
- Died: May 25, 2020 (aged 82); Matthews, North Carolina, U.S.
- Listed height: 6 ft 1 in (1.85 m)
- Listed weight: 200 lb (91 kg)

Career information
- College: UCLA
- NFL draft: 1960: 9th round, 97th overall pick
- AFL draft: 1960

Career history
- 1961–1964: Montreal Alouettes
- 1964–1972: Toronto Argonauts
- 1973–1974: Montreal Alouettes

Awards and highlights
- Grey Cup champion (1974); 6× CFL All-Star (1966, 1968–1972); 9× CFL East All-Star (1961, 1962, 1966–1972); First-team All-PCC (1960); Second-team All-PCC (1959)
- Canadian Football Hall of Fame (Class of 1990)

Marvin Luster (November 27, 1937 – May 25, 2020) was an American gridiron football defensive back and end. He played college football at UCLA and professional football in the Canadian Football League (CFL) from 1961 to 1974. He was inducted into the Canadian Football Hall of Fame in 1990.

== Early life ==
A native of Shreveport, Louisiana, Luster later moved westwards where he graduated from Belmont High School in Los Angeles, California. He attended the nearby UCLA where he ran track and also played for the UCLA Bruins football team. During the 1958, 1959, and 1960 NCAA seasons with the UCLA football team, he played on defense and offense (at the back and end positions) and caught 44 passes for 728 yards and eight touchdowns. During the summer of 1959, the movie Sergeant Rutledge was in production in Utah and Luster and his UCLA football teammate Gene Gaines both got one of the eleven uncredited roles as a trooper created by the film's Director, John Ford, according to AFI.com and IMDb.com. He was selected by the United Press International as a first-team end on its 1960 All-Pacific Coast football team.

== Professional career ==
Luster was selected 97th overall in the ninth round by the Los Angeles Rams in the 1960 NFL draft, and by the rival AFL's Buffalo Bills but opted instead to play in the Canadian Football League (CFL). From 1961 to 1974, Luster starred as a defensive back for the Toronto Argonauts and Montreal Alouettes being first in Montreal for 1961-1964, then up Highway 401 to Toronto for 1964-1972, and then back down that highway to Montreal for 1973-1974. He was selected six times as a CFL All-Star (1966, 1968–1972) and was part of the 1974 Alouettes team that won the Grey Cup. After that first Grey Cup win, with his old UCLA teammate and movie co-star Gene Gaines also on that winning team, Luster retired from football. In 1990, Luster was inducted into the Canadian Football Hall of Fame for his efforts. In November 2006, he was selected by the Canadian sports network TSN as one of the Top 50 players (#35) of the CFL's modern era.

== Later years and death ==
After retiring from football, Luster resided in Atlanta. He died from complications of COVID-19 during the COVID-19 pandemic in North Carolina, at an assisted living facility in Matthews, North Carolina.
