= 1966 CFL season =

Canadian Football League season

- Duration: June – October, 1966
- East champions: Ottawa Rough Riders
- West champions: Saskatchewan Roughriders

54th Grey Cup
- Date: November 26, 1966
- Venue: Empire Stadium, Vancouver
- Champions: Saskatchewan Roughriders

CFL seasons
- 1965 1967

Canadian Football League team locations: West, East

The 1966 CFL season was the Canadian Football League's ninth season since the 1958 merger of the Interprovincial Rugby Football Union and the Western Interprovincial Football Union to create a national league. It was the 13th season in modern-day Canadian football.

== CFL news in 1966 ==
The Canadian Football League made several rule changes. The league started to legalize unlimited blocking on rushing plays and introduced their new goose-necked goal posts. The league rewrote its rule book and reduced it in size.

The Canadian Rugby Union, owners of the trophy, granted trusteeship of the Grey Cup to the Canadian Football League in exchange for annual financial support for amateur football.

One of the more notable games of the regular season was Montreal's 1–0 victory over Ottawa, and is the lowest scoring game in CFL history.

== Regular season standings ==
West Division
Pos	Team	Pld	W	L	T	PF	PA	PD	Pts
1	Saskatchewan Roughriders (C, Q)	16	9	6	1	351	318	+33	19
2	Winnipeg Blue Bombers (Q)	16	8	7	1	264	230	+34	17
3	Edmonton Eskimos (Q)	16	6	9	1	251	328	−77	13
4	Calgary Stampeders	16	6	9	1	227	459	−232	13
5	BC Lions	16	5	11	0	254	269	−15	10

(C) First round bye; (Q) Qualified for playoffs

East Division
Pos	Team	Pld	W	L	T	PF	PA	PD	Pts
1	Ottawa Rough Riders (C, Q)	14	11	3	0	278	177	+101	22
2	Hamilton Tiger-Cats (Q)	14	9	5	0	264	160	+104	18
3	Montreal Alouettes (Q)	14	7	7	0	156	215	−59	14
4	Toronto Argonauts	14	5	9	0	166	271	−105	10

(C) First round bye; (Q) Qualified for playoffs

Saskatchewan and Ottawa have first round byes.

== Grey Cup playoffs ==
Note: All dates in 1966

=== Conference semi-finals ===
Western Semi-Finals
Edmonton Eskimos @ Winnipeg Blue Bombers
Date	Away	Home
November 6	Edmonton Eskimos 8	Winnipeg Blue Bombers 16

Eastern Semi-Finals
Montreal Alouettes @ Hamilton Tiger-Cats
Date	Away	Home
November 6	Montreal Alouettes 14	Hamilton Tiger-Cats 24

=== Conference finals ===
Western Finals
Winnipeg Blue Bombers vs Saskatchewan Roughriders
Game	Date	Away	Home
1	November 13	Winnipeg Blue Bombers 7	Saskatchewan Roughriders 14
2	November 16	Saskatchewan Roughriders 21	Winnipeg Blue Bombers 19
Saskatchewan wins the best of three series 2–0

Eastern Finals
Ottawa Rough Riders vs Hamilton Tiger-Cats
Game	Date	Away	Home
1	November 13	Ottawa Rough Riders 30	Hamilton Tiger-Cats 1
2	November 19	Hamilton Tiger-Cats 16	Ottawa Rough Riders 42
Ottawa won 2 game total-point series 72–17

== Playoff bracket ==
Division Semifinals
East
E2	Hamilton Tiger Cats	24
E3	Montreal Alouettes	14
West
W2	Winnipeg Blue Bombers	16
W3	Edmonton Eskimos	8

Division Finals
E1	Ottawa Rough Riders	72 (30+42)
E2	Hamilton Tiger Cats	17 (1+16)
W1	Saskatchewan Roughriders	2 (14,21)
W2	Winnipeg Blue Bombers	0 (7,19)

54th Grey Cup
E1	Ottawa Rough Riders	14
W1	Saskatchewan Roughriders	29

=== Grey Cup Championship ===
November 26 54th Annual Grey Cup Game: Empire Stadium – Vancouver, British Columbia
Western Champion	Eastern Champion
Saskatchewan Roughriders 29	Ottawa Rough Riders 14
The Saskatchewan Roughriders are the 1966 Grey Cup Champions

== CFL leaders ==
- CFL passing leaders
- CFL rushing leaders
- CFL receiving leaders

== 1966 CFL All-Stars ==
=== Offence ===
- QB – Russ Jackson, Ottawa Rough Riders
- RB – George Reed, Saskatchewan Roughriders
- RB – Jim Thomas, Edmonton Eskimos
- RB – Dave Raimey, Winnipeg Blue Bombers
- SE – Jim Worden, Saskatchewan Roughriders
- TE – Tommy Joe Coffey, Edmonton Eskimos
- F – Hugh Campbell, Saskatchewan Roughriders
- C – Ted Urness, Saskatchewan Roughriders
- OG – Al Benecick, Saskatchewan Roughriders
- OG – Chuck Walton, Hamilton Tiger-Cats
- OT – Bill Frank, Toronto Argonauts
- OT – Frank Rigney, Winnipeg Blue Bombers
- OT – Clyde Brock, Saskatchewan Roughriders

=== Defence ===
- DT – John Barrow, Hamilton Tiger-Cats
- DT – Don Luzzi, Calgary Stampeders
- DE – Billy Ray Locklin, Hamilton Tiger-Cats
- DE – E. A. Sims, Edmonton Eskimos
- LB – Wayne Harris, Calgary Stampeders
- LB – Phil Minnick, Winnipeg Blue Bombers
- LB – Ken Lehmann, Ottawa Rough Riders
- LB – Jim Conroy, Ottawa Rough Riders
- DB – Gene Gaines, Ottawa Rough Riders
- DB – Garney Henley, Hamilton Tiger-Cats
- DB – Marv Luster, Toronto Argonauts
- DB – Ed Ulmer, Winnipeg Blue Bombers
- DB – Joe Poirier, Ottawa Rough Riders

== 1966 Eastern All-Stars ==
=== Offence ===
- QB – Russ Jackson, Ottawa Rough Riders
- RB – Don Lisbon, Montreal Alouettes
- RB – Bo Scott, Ottawa Rough Riders
- RB – Dave Thelen, Toronto Argonauts
- TE – Ted Watkins, Ottawa Rough Riders
- SE – Hal Patterson, Hamilton Tiger-Cats
- F – Whit Tucker, Ottawa Rough Riders
- C – Doug Specht, Ottawa Rough Riders
- OG – Tony Pajaczkowski, Montreal Alouettes
- OG – Chuck Walton, Hamilton Tiger-Cats
- OT – Bill Frank, Toronto Argonauts
- OT – Moe Racine, Ottawa Rough Riders

=== Defence ===
- DT – John Barrow, Hamilton Tiger-Cats
- DT – Angelo Mosca, Hamilton Tiger-Cats
- DE – Billy Ray Locklin, Hamilton Tiger-Cats
- DE – Billy Joe Booth, Ottawa Rough Riders
- LB – Wilbert Scott, Montreal Alouettes
- LB – Ken Lehmann, Ottawa Rough Riders
- LB – Jim Conroy, Ottawa Rough Riders
- DB – Gene Gaines, Ottawa Rough Riders
- DB – Garney Henley, Hamilton Tiger-Cats
- DB – Marv Luster, Toronto Argonauts
- DB – Ed Learn, Montreal Alouettes
- DB – Joe Poirier, Ottawa Rough Riders

== 1966 Western All-Stars ==
=== Offence ===
- QB – Ron Lancaster, Saskatchewan Roughriders
- RB – George Reed, Saskatchewan Roughriders
- RB – Jim Thomas, Edmonton Eskimos
- RB – Dave Raimey, Winnipeg Blue Bombers
- SE – Jim Worden, Saskatchewan Roughriders
- TE – Tommy Joe Coffey, Edmonton Eskimos
- F – Hugh Campbell, Saskatchewan Roughriders
- C – Ted Urness, Saskatchewan Roughriders
- OG – Al Benecick, Saskatchewan Roughriders
- OG – Jack Abendschan, Saskatchewan Roughriders
- OG – Tom Hinton, BC Lions
- OT – Frank Rigney, Winnipeg Blue Bombers
- OT – Clyde Brock, Saskatchewan Roughriders

=== Defence ===
- DT – Mike Cacic, BC Lions
- DT – Don Luzzi, Calgary Stampeders
- DE – Garner Ekstran, Saskatchewan Roughriders
- DE – E. A. Sims, Edmonton Eskimos
- LB – Wayne Harris, Calgary Stampeders
- LB – Phil Minnick, Winnipeg Blue Bombers
- LB – Wayne Shaw, Saskatchewan Roughriders
- DB – Jerry Keeling, Calgary Stampeders
- DB – Bob Kosid, Saskatchewan Roughriders
- DB – Ernie Pitts, Winnipeg Blue Bombers
- DB – Ed Ulmer, Winnipeg Blue Bombers
- DB – Bill Redell, Edmonton Eskimos

== 1966 CFL awards ==
- CFL's Most Outstanding Player Award – Russ Jackson (QB), Ottawa Rough Riders
- CFL's Most Outstanding Canadian Award – Russ Jackson (QB), Ottawa Rough Riders
- CFL's Most Outstanding Lineman Award – Wayne Harris (LB), Calgary Stampeders
- CFL's Coach of the Year – Frank Clair, Ottawa Rough Riders
- Jeff Russel Memorial Trophy (Eastern MVP) – Gene Gaines (DB), Ottawa Rough Riders
- Jeff Nicklin Memorial Trophy (Western MVP) - Ron Lancaster (QB), Saskatchewan Roughriders
- Gruen Trophy (Eastern Rookie of the Year) - Mike Wadsworth (DL), Toronto Argonauts
- Dr. Beattie Martin Trophy (Western Rookie of the Year) - Garry Lefebvre (WR/P), Edmonton Eskimos
- DeMarco–Becket Memorial Trophy (Western Outstanding Lineman) - Wayne Harris (LB), Calgary Stampeders
