= 1970 CFL season =

Canadian Football League season

- East champions: Montreal Alouettes
- West champions: Calgary Stampeders

58th Grey Cup
- Champions: Montreal Alouettes

CFL seasons
- 1969 1971

Canadian Football League team locations: West, East

The 1970 CFL season is considered to be the 17th season in modern-day Canadian football, although it is officially the 13th Canadian Football League season.

== CFL news in 1970 ==
3M Tartan Turf was installed at Vancouver's Empire Stadium, making it the first CFL venue to have artificial turf. The first sod was preserved and sent to Hamilton to be used as part of the future Canadian Football Hall of Fame building. The first CFL All-Star Game was held since 1958. The Montreal Alouettes are sold to former Ottawa Rough Rider owner Sam Berger, who changes their colours to green, white and red, and it is the beginning of a great dynasty in Montreal.

== Regular season standings ==
West Division
Pos	Team	Pld	W	L	T	PF	PA	PD	Pts
1	Saskatchewan Roughriders (C, Q)	16	14	2	0	369	206	+163	28
2	Edmonton Eskimos (Q)	16	9	7	0	282	287	−5	18
3	Calgary Stampeders (Q)	16	9	7	0	293	209	+84	18
4	BC Lions	16	6	10	0	295	384	−89	12
5	Winnipeg Blue Bombers	16	2	14	0	184	332	−148	4

(C) First round bye; (Q) Qualified for playoffs

East Division
Pos	Team	Pld	W	L	T	PF	PA	PD	Pts
1	Hamilton Tiger-Cats (C, Q)	14	8	5	1	292	279	+13	17
2	Toronto Argonauts (Q)	14	8	6	0	329	290	+39	16
3	Montreal Alouettes (Q)	14	7	6	1	246	279	−33	15
4	Ottawa Rough Riders	14	4	10	0	255	279	−24	8

(C) First round bye; (Q) Qualified for playoffs

Saskatchewan and Hamilton have first round byes.

== Grey Cup playoffs ==
Note: All dates in 1970

=== Conference Semi-Finals ===
Western Semi-Finals
Calgary Stampeders @ Edmonton Eskimos
Date	Away	Home
November 8	Calgary Stampeders 16	Edmonton Eskimos 9

Eastern Semi-Finals
Montreal Alouettes @ Toronto Argonauts
Date	Away	Home
November 8	Montreal Alouettes 16	Toronto Argonauts 7

=== Conference Finals ===
Western Finals
Calgary Stampeders vs Saskatchewan Roughriders
Game	Date	Away	Home
1	November 14	Calgary Stampeders 28	Saskatchewan Roughriders 11
2	November 18	Saskatchewan Roughriders 11	Calgary Stampeders 3
3	November 22	Calgary Stampeders 15	Saskatchewan Roughriders 14
Calgary wins the best of three series 2–1

Eastern Finals
Hamilton Tiger-Cats vs Montreal Alouettes
Game	Date	Away	Home
1	November 15	Hamilton Tiger-Cats 22	Montreal Alouettes 32
2	November 21	Montreal Alouettes 11	Hamilton Tiger-Cats 4
Montreal won the 2 game total-point series 43–26

== Playoff bracket ==
Division Semifinals
East
E2	Toronto Argonauts	7
E3	Montreal Alouettes	16
West
W2	Edmonton Eskimos	9
W3	Calgary Stampeders	16

Division Finals
E1	Hamilton Tiger Cats	26 (22+4)
E3	Montreal Alouettes	43 (32+11)
W1	Saskatchewan Roughriders	1 (11,11,14)
W3	Calgary Stampeders	2 (28,3,15)

58th Grey Cup
E3	Montreal Alouettes	23
W3	Calgary Stampeders	10

=== Grey Cup Championship ===
November 28 58th Annual Grey Cup Game: Exhibition Stadium – Toronto, Ontario
Western Champion	Eastern Champion
Calgary Stampeders 10	Montreal Alouettes 23
The Montreal Alouettes are the 1970 Grey Cup Champions
Sonny Wade (QB), Montreal Alouettes – Grey Cup's Most Valuable Player.

== 1970 CFL All-Stars ==
=== Offence ===
- QB – Ron Lancaster, Saskatchewan Roughriders
- RB – Bill Symons, Toronto Argonauts
- RB – Hugh McKinnis, Calgary Stampeders
- RB – Jim Evenson, BC Lions
- TE – Herman Harrison, Calgary Stampeders
- SE – Tommy Joe Coffey, Hamilton Tiger-Cats
- F – Jim Thorpe, Toronto Argonauts
- C – Ted Urness, Saskatchewan Roughriders
- OG – Charlie Bray, Toronto Argonauts
- OG – Bill Danychuk, Hamilton Tiger-Cats
- OG – Ken Sugarman, BC Lions
- OT – Bill Frank, Winnipeg Blue Bombers
- OT – Ellison Kelly, Hamilton Tiger-Cats

=== Defence ===
- DT – Angelo Mosca, Hamilton Tiger-Cats
- DT – Greg Pipes, Edmonton Eskimos
- DE – Steve Smear, Montreal Alouettes
- DE – Ed Harrington, Toronto Argonauts
- LB – Wayne Harris, Calgary Stampeders
- LB – Jerry Campbell, Ottawa Rough Riders
- LB – Greg Findlay, BC Lions
- DB – John Wydareny, Edmonton Eskimos
- DB – Garney Henley, Hamilton Tiger-Cats
- DB – Al Phaneuf, Montreal Alouettes
- DB – Al Marcelin, Ottawa Rough Riders
- DB – Marv Luster, Toronto Argonauts

== 1970 Eastern All-Stars ==
=== Offence ===
- QB – Gary Wood, Ottawa Rough Riders
- RB – Bill Symons, Toronto Argonauts
- RB – Moses Denson, Montreal Alouettes
- RB – Dave Fleming, Hamilton Tiger-Cats
- TE – Mel Profit, Toronto Argonauts
- SE – Tommy Joe Coffey, Hamilton Tiger-Cats
- F – Jim Thorpe, Toronto Argonauts
- C – Gene Ceppetelli, Montreal Alouettes
- OG – Charlie Bray, Toronto Argonauts
- OG – Bill Danychuk, Hamilton Tiger-Cats
- OT – Ed George, Montreal Alouettes
- OT – Ellison Kelly, Hamilton Tiger-Cats

=== Defence ===
- DT – Angelo Mosca, Hamilton Tiger-Cats
- DT – Marshall Shirk, Ottawa Rough Riders
- DE – Steve Smear, Montreal Alouettes
- DE – Ed Harrington, Toronto Argonauts
- LB – Charlie Collins, Montreal Alouettes
- LB – Jerry Campbell, Ottawa Rough Riders
- LB – Mike Widger, Montreal Alouettes
- DB – Jim Tomlin, Toronto Argonauts
- DB – Garney Henley, Hamilton Tiger-Cats
- DB – Al Phaneuf, Montreal Alouettes
- DB – Al Marcelin, Ottawa Rough Riders
- DB – Marv Luster, Toronto Argonauts

== 1970 Western All-Stars ==
=== Offence ===
- QB – Ron Lancaster, Saskatchewan Roughriders
- RB – Silas McKinnie, Saskatchewan Roughriders
- RB – Hugh McKinnis, Calgary Stampeders
- RB – Jim Evenson, BC Lions
- TE – Herman Harrison, Calgary Stampeders
- SE – Rick Shaw, Winnipeg Blue Bombers
- F – Mike Eben, Edmonton Eskimos
- C – Ted Urness, Saskatchewan Roughriders
- OG – Jack Abendschan, Saskatchewan Roughriders
- OG – Ken Sugarman, BC Lions
- OT – Bill Frank, Winnipeg Blue Bombers
- OT – Lanny Boleski, Calgary Stampeders

=== Defence ===
- DT – John Helton, Calgary Stampeders
- DT – Greg Pipes, Edmonton Eskimos
- DE – Ron Forwick, Edmonton Eskimos
- DE – Ken Frith, Saskatchewan Roughriders
- LB – Wayne Harris, Calgary Stampeders
- LB – Dave Gasser, Edmonton Eskimos
- LB – Greg Findlay, BC Lions
- DB – John Wydareny, Edmonton Eskimos
- DB – Bruce Bennett, Saskatchewan Roughriders
- DB – Paul Brule, Winnipeg Blue Bombers
- DB – Ted Dushinski, Saskatchewan Roughriders
- DB – Joe Hernandez, Edmonton Eskimos

== 1970 CFL awards ==
- CFL's Most Outstanding Player Award – Ron Lancaster (QB), Saskatchewan Roughriders
- CFL's Most Outstanding Canadian Award – Jim Young (WR), BC Lions
- CFL's Most Outstanding Lineman Award – Wayne Harris (LB), Calgary Stampeders
- CFL's Coach of the Year – Ray Jauch, Edmonton Eskimos
- Jeff Russel Memorial Trophy (Eastern MVP) – Bill Symons (RB), Toronto Argonauts
- Jeff Nicklin Memorial Trophy (Western MVP) - Ron Lancaster (QB), Saskatchewan Roughriders
- Gruen Trophy (Eastern Rookie of the Year) - Jim Corrigall (DL), Toronto Argonauts
- Dr. Beattie Martin Trophy (Western Rookie of the Year) - John Senst (WR), Winnipeg Blue Bombers
- DeMarco–Becket Memorial Trophy (Western Outstanding Lineman) - Greg Pipes (DT), Edmonton Eskimos

== 1970 Miss Grey Cup ==
Team Nominees
Miss BC Lions	Shelley Schwartz
Miss Calgary Stampeders	Patricia Sundberg
Miss Edmonton Eskimos	Anita Urschel
Miss Hamilton Tiger-Cats	Linda Endicott
Miss Montreal Alouettes	Nancy Durrell
Miss Ottawa Rough Riders	Wendy Thomas
Miss Saskatchewan Roughriders	Susan Pugsley
Miss Toronto Argonauts	Janice Boyd
Miss Winnipeg Blue Bombers	Shirley Richlew

- Miss Montreal Alouettes Nancy Durrell was named Miss Grey Cup 1970, with Miss Edmonton Eskimos Anita Urschel the first runner-up, and Miss Hamilton Tiger-Cats Linda Endicott the second runner-up. A fourth-year student at McGill University, she received a new 1971 Buick Opel, a mink stole, a diamond watch, a rhinestone tiara, a peignoir set, a stadium coat, a pant suit, boots, a shoulder bag, a Miss Grey Cup brooch, a two-year "keep fit" membership at a health club, and a professional beauty kit.
