= DSBN Academy =

- Entrance to main campus

Location
- 130 Louth Street; St. Catharines, Ontario, L2S 2T8; Canada; 43.1384°N 79.2568°W

Information
- School type: Public High school/Middle school
- Motto: Achievement through Opportunity
- Founded: 2011
- School board: District School Board of Niagara
- Principal: Mr. E. Stewart (secondary); Mrs. J. Moore (elementary)
- Grades: 6–12
- Language: English
- Colours: Blue and Green
- Slogan: "We believe and we will achieve"
- Song: "I Believe"
- Mascot: The Academy Argonaut
- Team name: Argonauts
- Website: academy.dsbn.org

The DSBN Academy, is a public high school and middle school (grades 6–12) in St. Catharines, Ontario, Canada. It is located on Louth Street and is part of the District School Board of Niagara. The DSBN Academy accepts students from anywhere in the Niagara Region. The school's program is designed to provide additional academic support for students from low-income backgrounds to better prepare them for post-secondary education.

== History ==
The site on which the DSBN Academy is built was originally part of a 100-acre land grant that was conveyed to John Gould by Letters Patent from the Crown in 1806. He sold off parcels of this land during the succeeding years, and by the time of Confederation, it had been fragmented into the hands of fifty-four different owners. Among the names of early settlers of this area are found, as recorded by the Registrar of Deeds, those of: Merritt, Woodruff, Rykert, Macdonald, Mettleberger, Bullivant, Adams and Brown.

In 1963, the Board of Education for the City of St. Catharines took steps towards building a local school in the area originally designated as West Park. Approximately fifteen acres would be purchased in an area bound by Louth Street, Rykert Street and Powerview Avenue. By arrangement with the City of St. Catharines, through the Parks and Recreation Commission, it was agreed that this area should be developed as a school-recreation-park complex. The Board of Education purchased approximately seven acres, from a private owner. The city made available to the Board about seven acres of the unopened Homeland Plan subdivision, and jointly the Board and the city acquired another acre from the rear of the lots on Louth Street, For the building project the firm of Macbeth, Williams, Woodruff and Hadaway was chosen as architects and the general contract was awarded to Newman Brothers Company Limited. Construction began on October 14, 1967. The total cost of the school was $3,250,943.00 of which $1,985,943.00 was received as federal-provincial grants.

At the school is a track and field centre operated by the Niagara Olympic Club.

=== Recent ===
The DSBN Academy was founded in 2010 and opened its doors in September 2011, offering classes in grades six and seven. The original building it occupied was the former Empire Public School in Welland, Ontario but, in 2013, relocated to the previous West Park Secondary School in St. Catharines where it has occupied ever since. That year the school had approximately 200 students.

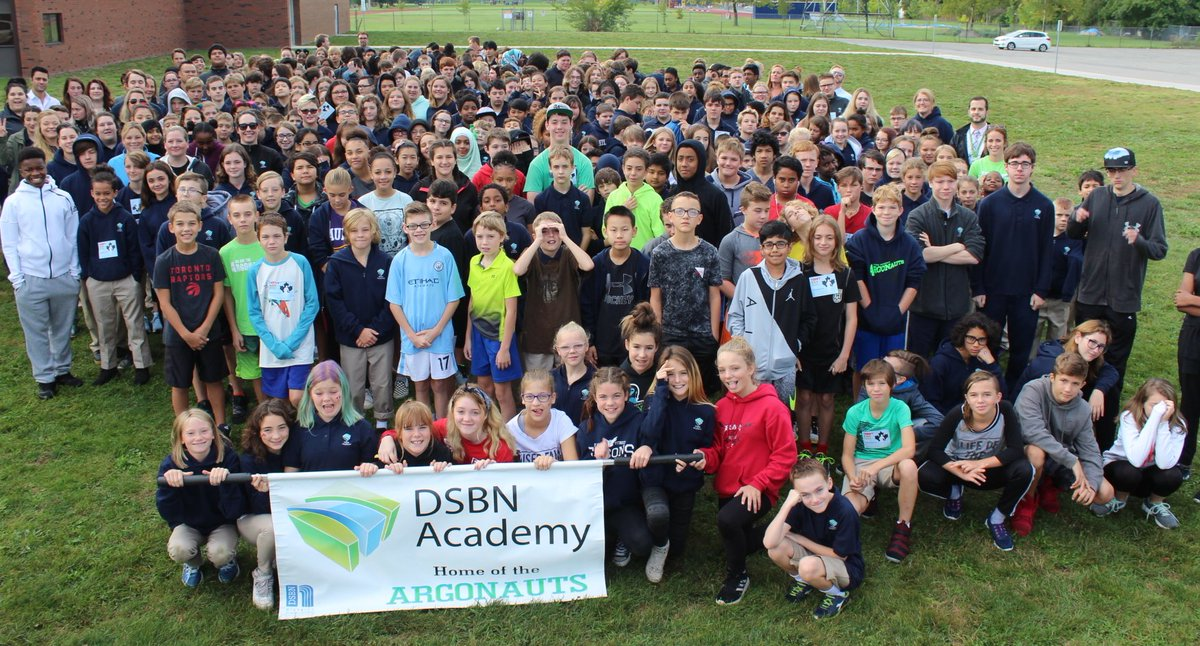
The academy enrolment of 2018-2019

In 2015 the academy received a $30,000 grant to purchase new instruments for the school's music program.

In 2017 the first class of 45 Grade 12 students graduated from the school.

The academy annually receives a grant from RBC of $25,000 to go towards scholarships, technology, and academics.

In 2019, the DSBN Academy raised over $1400 for the humanitarian organization Water for South Sudan. The organization's founder and protagonist of the semi-biographical novel A Long Walk to Water, Salva Dut, visited the school personally to congratulate the students.

Several teachers from the DSBN Academy protested Ontarian Minister of Education Stephen Lecce for his budget cuts to public education in 2019.

As of 2020, the DSBN Academy has accumulated over $75,000 in bursaries for its graduates through the Denim, Diamonds & Diplomas fundraising event. The academy Jazz Band traditionally performs at the event each year.

On October 20, 2022, Njacko Backo went to the academy for a massive presentation in front of many people, about Cameroon and instruments that he plays.

==== COVID-19 pandemic ====
The DSBN Academy, like all public schools in Ontario, was drastically affected by the COVID-19 pandemic during the 2019–2020 school year. In March 2020, the school was asked to close by the Ontario Ministry of Health. As a result, the graduation ceremony for the class of 2020 had to be postponed until the next academic year.

== School life ==
The creed is spoken each morning of the school day after the national anthem. All students wear navy blue or white uniform shirts with grey pants or an optional skirt for secondary students and khaki pants for middle school.

The DSBN Academy takes students in from anywhere in the Niagara Peninsula emphasising achievement for all socio-economic classes. It therefore has a diverse enrolment of students from every background.

Extracurricular programs and activities include seasonal sports, Reach for the Top Trivia Team, science club, art club, fitness, Student Innovators, homework club, fishing club, ball hockey, school band, Gay-Straight Alliance, Magic the Gathering, Dungeons & Dragons, choir, and book club.

== Principals ==
Elementary
Principals	Year
Tom Reynolds	2011-2014
Andrea Grieve	2014-2019
Derek Harley	2019-2022
Jennifer Moore	2022–2025
Fiona Boone	2025–present

Secondary
Principals	Year
Lisa Nazar	2012–2023
Eric Stewart	2023–present

== See also ==
- District School Board of Niagara
- Education in Ontario
- Regional Municipality of Niagara
- Reach for the Top
- Ridley College - unofficially accredited to be rivals with the DSBN Academy
