= Grimsby Secondary School =

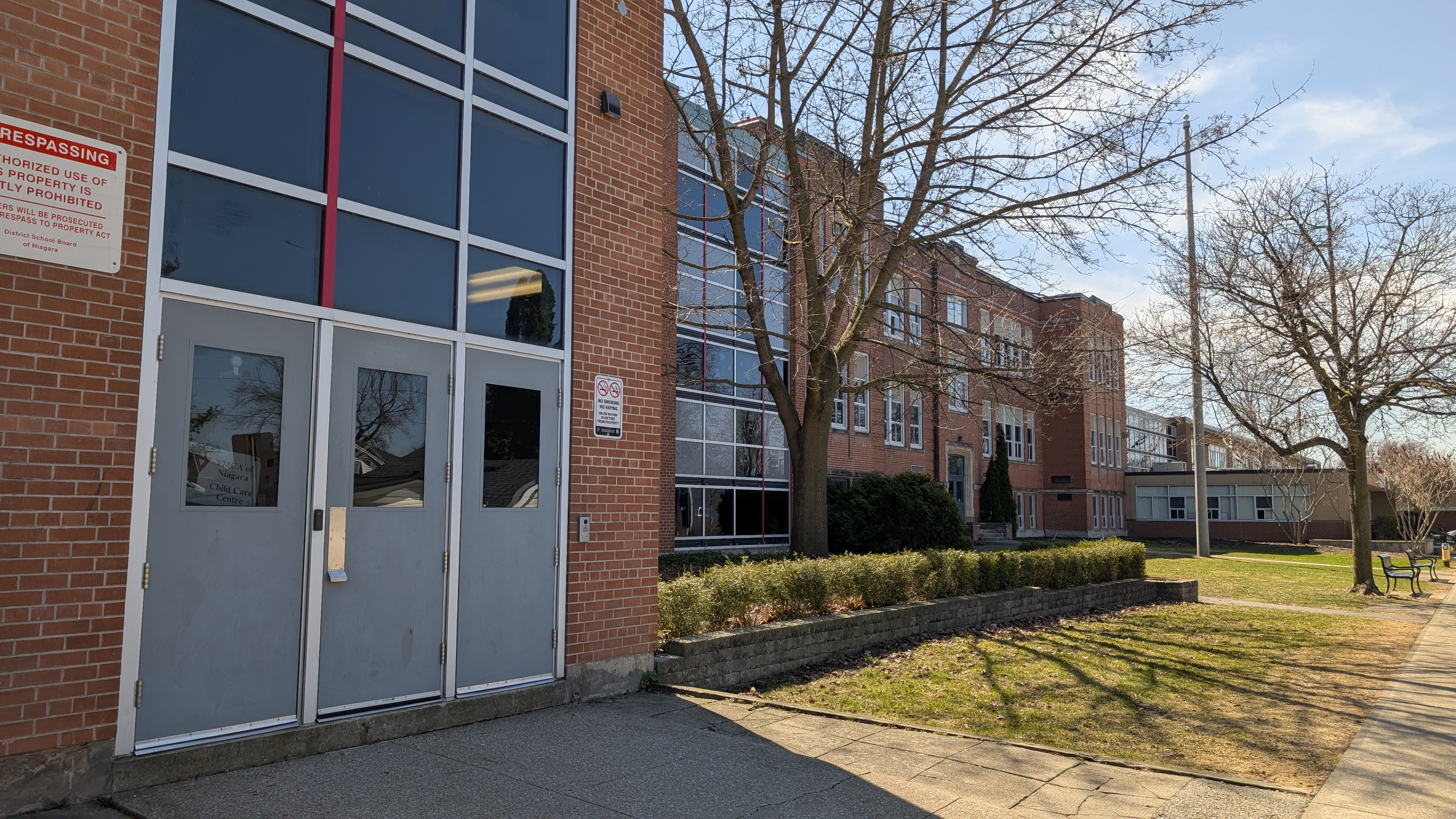

Location
- 5 Boulton Avenue; Niagara; Grimsby, Ontario, L3M 1H6; Canada

Information
- Other names: GSS
- School type: Secondary school
- Motto: Semper paratus (Always ready)
- Established: 1925
- Closed: 2022
- School board: DSBN
- Website: web.archive.org/web/20220430210936/https://grimsbyss.dsbn.org/
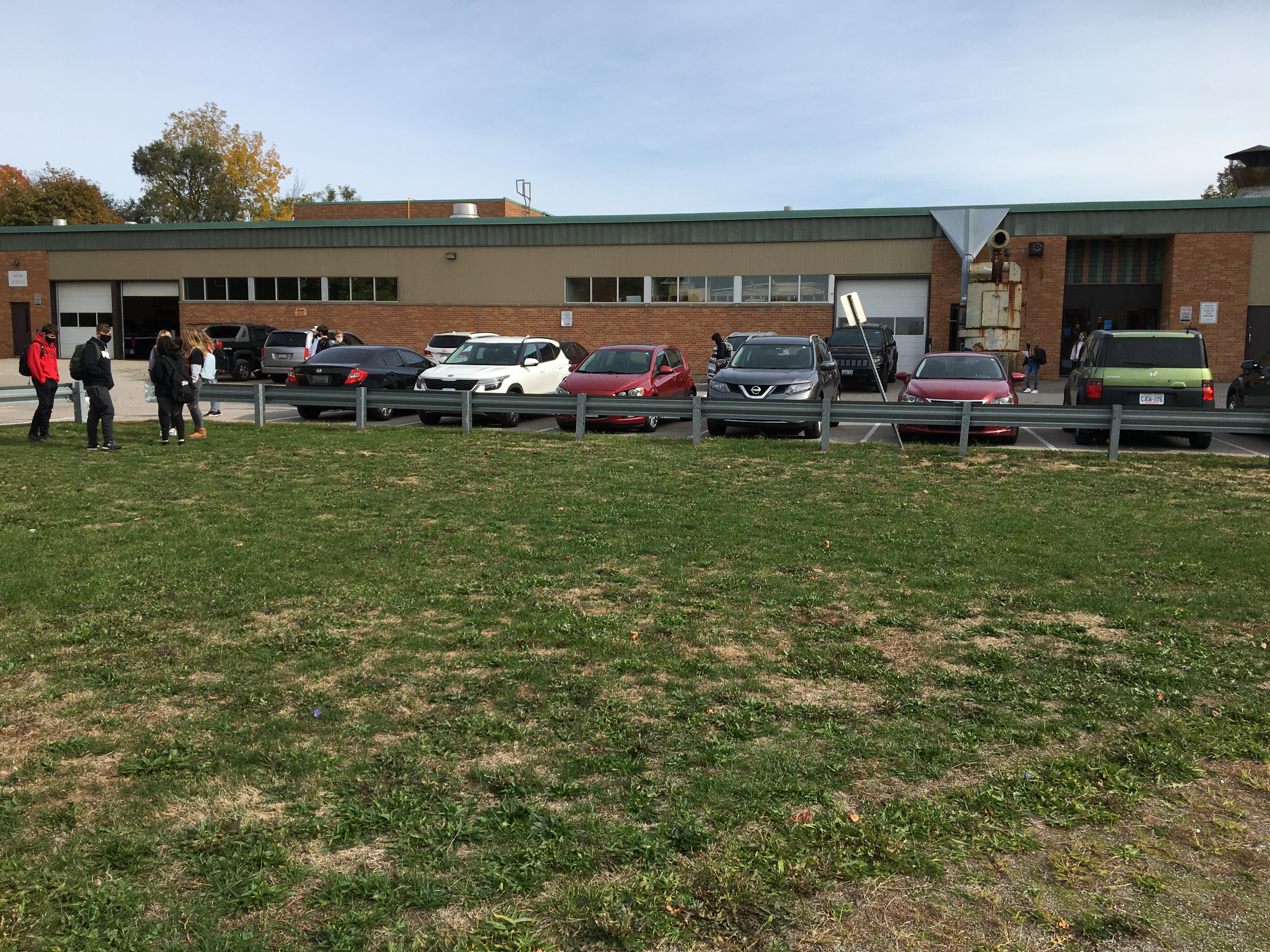
- Grimsby Secondary School viewed from the field

Grimsby Secondary School (GSS) was a secondary school in Grimsby, Ontario, Canada in operation from 1925-2022. Operated by the District School Board of Niagara (DSBN), it had a student body of approximately 700 year-to-year.

== Planned closure ==
On March 28, 2017, the District School Board of Niagara voted in favour of a motion to close three high schools, including Grimsby Secondary School, in favour of a single large high school to be constructed at 5699 King Street in Beamsville. Grimsby Secondary School closed in 2022 following the 2021–2022 school year, and the new amalgamated high school, named West Niagara Secondary School, opened in September 2022. Many groups opposed the closure of Grimsby Secondary School. The Town of Grimsby, as well as the Town of Lincoln, both passed motions voicing opposition. Niagara West-Glanbrook Member of Provincial Parliament Sam Oosterhoff, himself a recent high school graduate, has also voiced opposition to the amalgamation plans, and has spoken in the Ontario Legislative Assembly in favour of a moratorium on school closures. On Wednesday, March 29, students at South Lincoln High School walked out of class in protest over the closure and amalgamation plans (which affect South Lincoln High School as well as Grimsby Secondary School and Beamsville District Secondary School).

== Grade inflation ==
In 2018, the University of Waterloo revealed a formerly secret part of their engineering admissions process designed to counter grade inflation among high schools. Schools were listed based on how much their students' marks changed from high school to university; the change in marks being called the "adjustment factor". Grimsby Secondary School faced significant criticism for having the highest adjustment factor out of any high school on the list, with Grimsby students seeing their grades drop by over 27 percent, versus an average Ontario high school student who only had their marks drop 17 percent. Rebecca Judd, former student at Grimsby, said that the school didn't do enough to prepare her for university, saying that she "found that good marks were pretty effortless" at the Grimsby. The District School Board of Niagara disputed this characterization, saying that the University of Waterloo only applies the adjustment factor to 10% of Ontario schools, and that "this very small sample does not reflect the hard work of our students and teachers."

== See also ==
- List of high schools in Ontario
