= Grimsby, Ontario =

Grimsby
- Town (lower-tier)
- Town of Grimsby
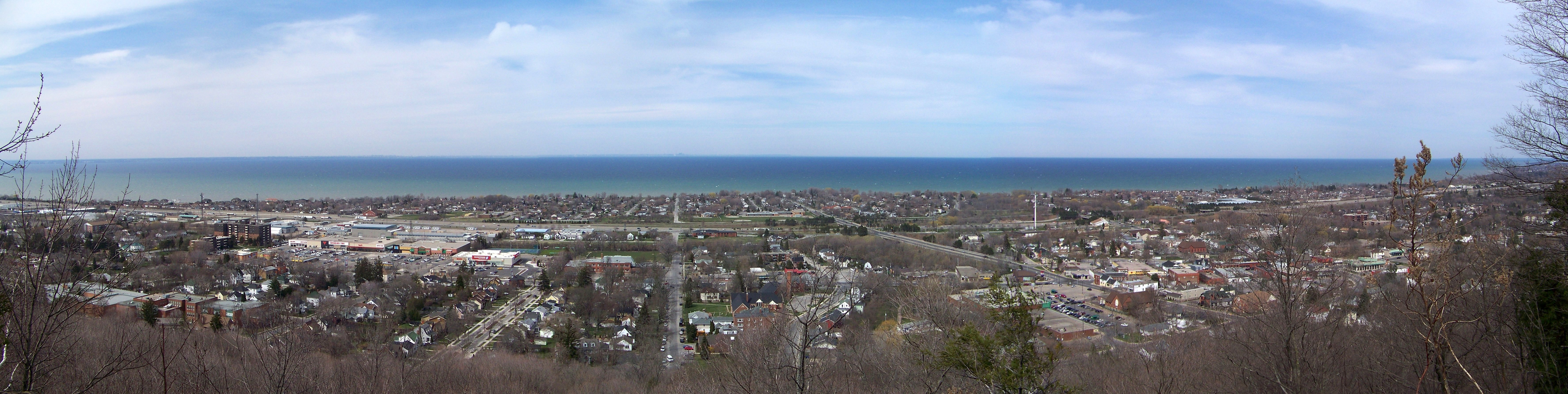

- Coat of arms

- Location within Regional Municipality of Niagara Location within Southern Ontario
- Coordinates: 43°12′N 79°33′W
- Country: Canada
- Province: Ontario
- Regional Municipality: Niagara
- Settled: 1790

Government
  - Type: Town
  - Mayor: Jeff A. Jordan
  - Governing Body: Town of Grimsby Council
  - MP: Dean Allison (CPC)
  - MPP: Sam Oosterhoff (PC)

Area
  - Land: 68.71 km^{2} (26.53 sq mi)

Population (2021)
  - Total: 28,883
  - Density: 420.4/km^{2} (1,089/sq mi)
- Time zone: UTC-5 (EST)
  - Summer (DST): UTC-4 (EDT)
- Forward Sortation Area: L3M
- Area codes: 905/289/365
- Highways: Queen Elizabeth Way
- Website: www.grimsby.ca

Grimsby is a town on Lake Ontario in the Niagara Region, Ontario, Canada. Grimsby is at the eastern end of the Hamilton Census Metropolitan Area. It is named after the English fishing town of Grimsby in north-east Lincolnshire. The majority of residents reside in the area bounded by Lake Ontario and the Niagara Escarpment, home to a section of the Bruce Trail.

Grimsby has experienced significant growth over the past two decades due to its position between Hamilton and St. Catharines. Growth is limited by the natural boundaries of Lake Ontario and the Niagara Escarpment. Some residents feel development is detrimental to the town as orchards close to the town centre are used for residential development; however, most of the orchards in Grimsby were replaced by houses between the 1950s and 1980s, and very few orchards remain.

According to a late 2019 report, the town has 33 small parks, 17 larger and "many more green spaces, sport fields, parkettes, trails, and facilities". Some notable attractions in Grimsby are the Grimsby Museum, the Grimsby Public Library, the Grimsby Public Art Gallery, the West Niagara YMCA, the Danish Church, and the hockey arena (Peach King Centre), home of the Grimsby Peach Kings.

== History ==
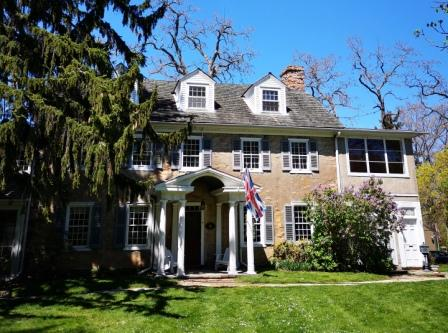
Nelles Manor, completed in 1798

A group of United Empire Loyalists from Great Britain settled on the land (originally named Township Number 6 and then 'The Forty'), and founded Grimsby in 1790. Robert Nelles, a politician and later lieutenant-colonel in the War of 1812, was one of the town's founders. His home on Main Street West was used for many planning sessions during the war. In 1816, the settlement became known as Grimsby, the name of the surrounding township, in memory of the seaport town of Grimsby in North East Lincolnshire, England. Historic St. Andrew's Anglican Church was founded in 1794 and the current building was completed in 1825.

The Village of Grimsby was officially incorporated in 1876 and became a town in 1922. The community has gone through many changes, from being a small rural village to a centre for the manufacture of farm machinery, hospital furniture, furnaces and other metal products; and later the hub of the Niagara Peninsula's fruit-growing industry. Grimsby also had a successful fishing industry which lasted until the 1960s. The Town of Grimsby and the Township of North Grimsby were amalgamated in 1970 with the formation of the Regional Municipality of Niagara. With a number of wineries and distilleries, Grimsby now serves as the starting point for touring the Niagara wine region.

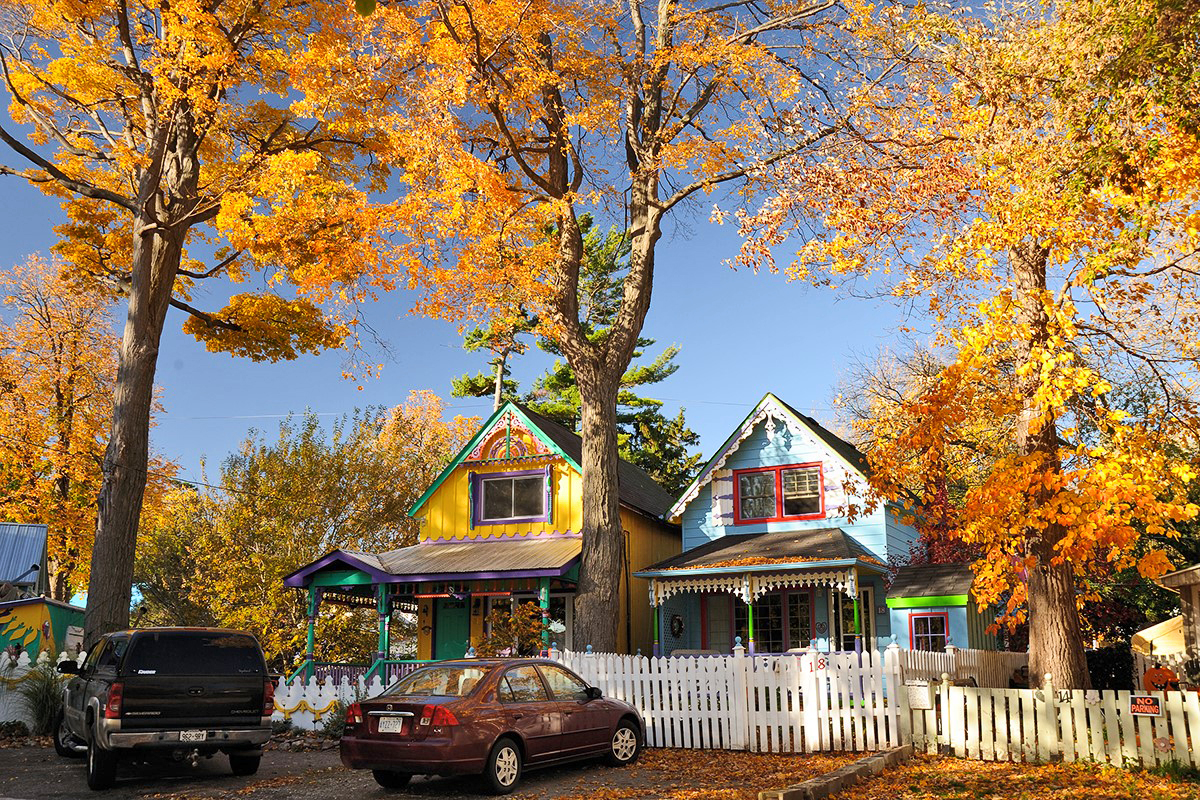
Two of the remaining cottages in the Grimsby Park area

Canada's first Chautauqua-like organization (a Methodist camp) was established in 1859 in Grimsby Park on land donated by J.B. Bowslaugh; colourful cottages were later built, and some visitors spent entire summers in the area. Two hotels and a temple were also built. Over 50,000 visited in 1884, but by 1900, interest had declined. By 1909, the Grimsby Park Company was bankrupt, and the property was sold for use as an amusement park. The temple and hotels were destroyed in the 1920s. In 1910, the amusement park's first owner, Harry Wylie, added carousels, a motion picture theatre, and a roller coaster. Canada Steamship Lines bought out the business in 1916, but the park declined through the 1920s, mainly due to multiple fires that consumed many of the wooden buildings. The operation had ceased by 1950, and the land was sold to developers who built cottages. Many of the colourful cottages were destroyed by fire or demolished over the years. As of 2019, Grimsby Pier, where ferries and steamships had once docked, was in a state of disrepair; the mayor said he hoped that it could be restored.

In 2011, Grimsby was struck by an F0 Tornado.

Grimsby is also the birthplace of a Hollywood director, Del Lord. He rose to acclaim as the director of most of the Three Stooges short vaudeville comedies. Later, under Columbia Pictures, he also directed nearly 200 feature films.

== Local government ==
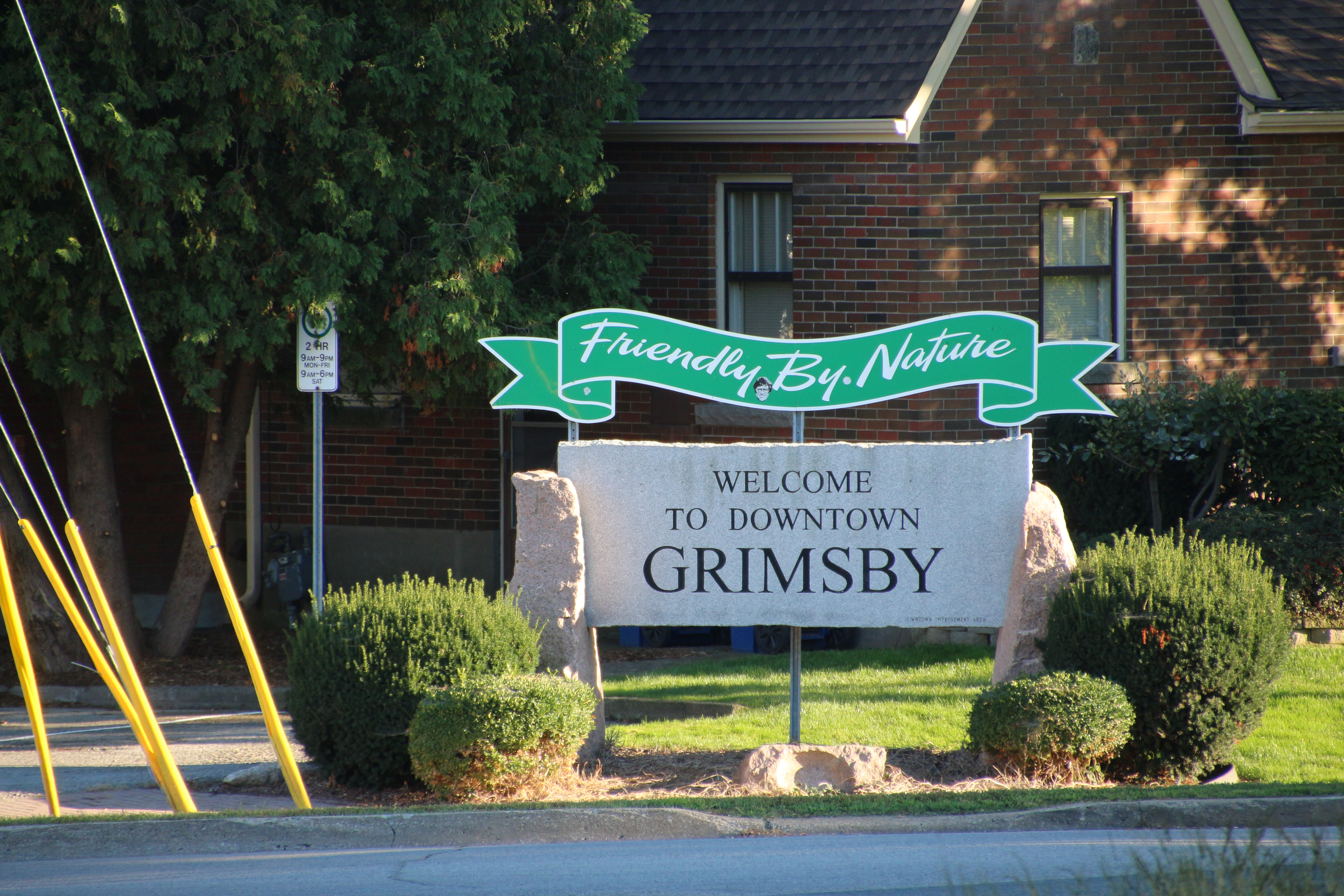
Grimsby Welcome Sign

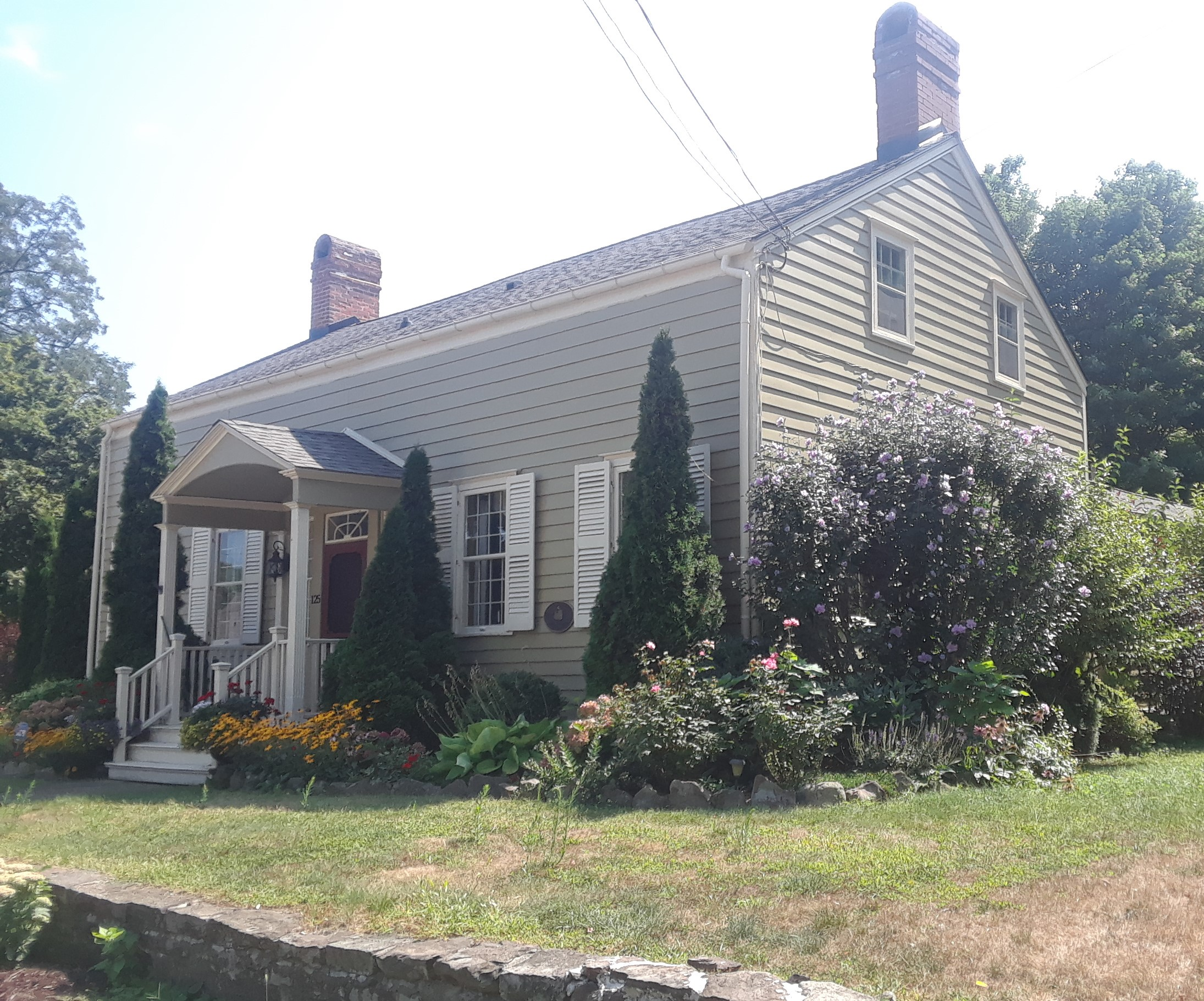
Nelles-Fitch House, c. 1791

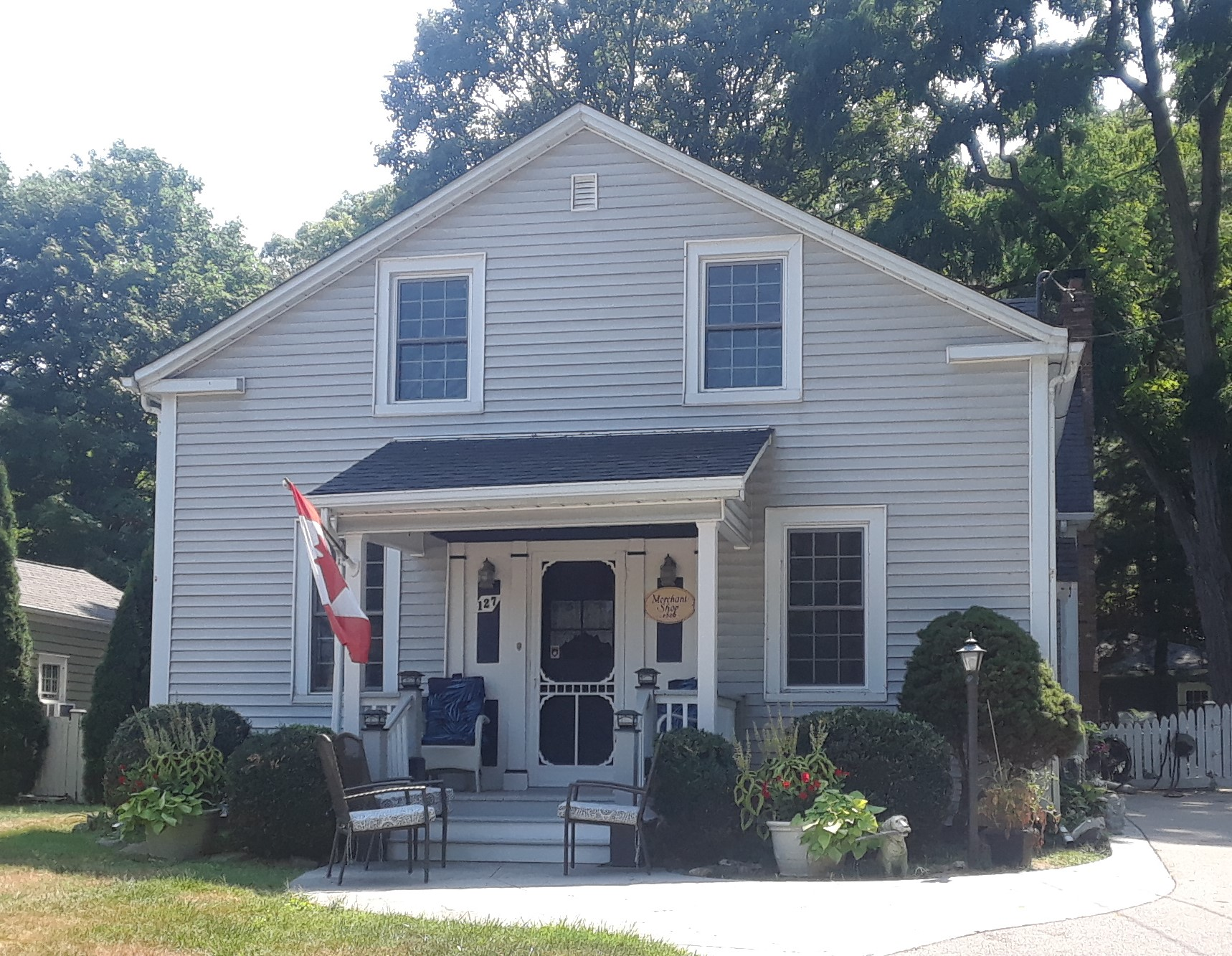
Nelles merchant shop, c. 1800

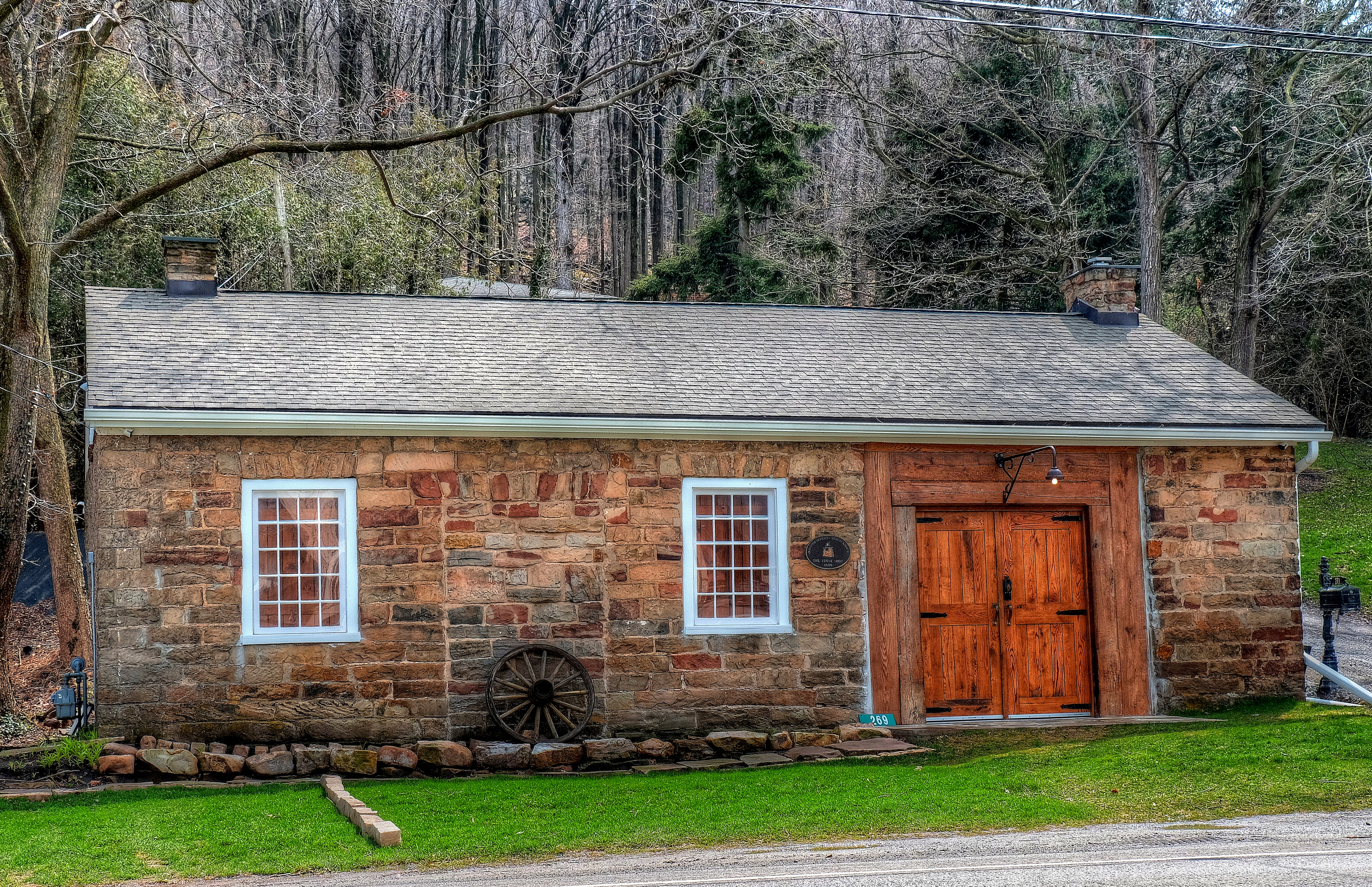
Grimsby old stone shop, c. 1800

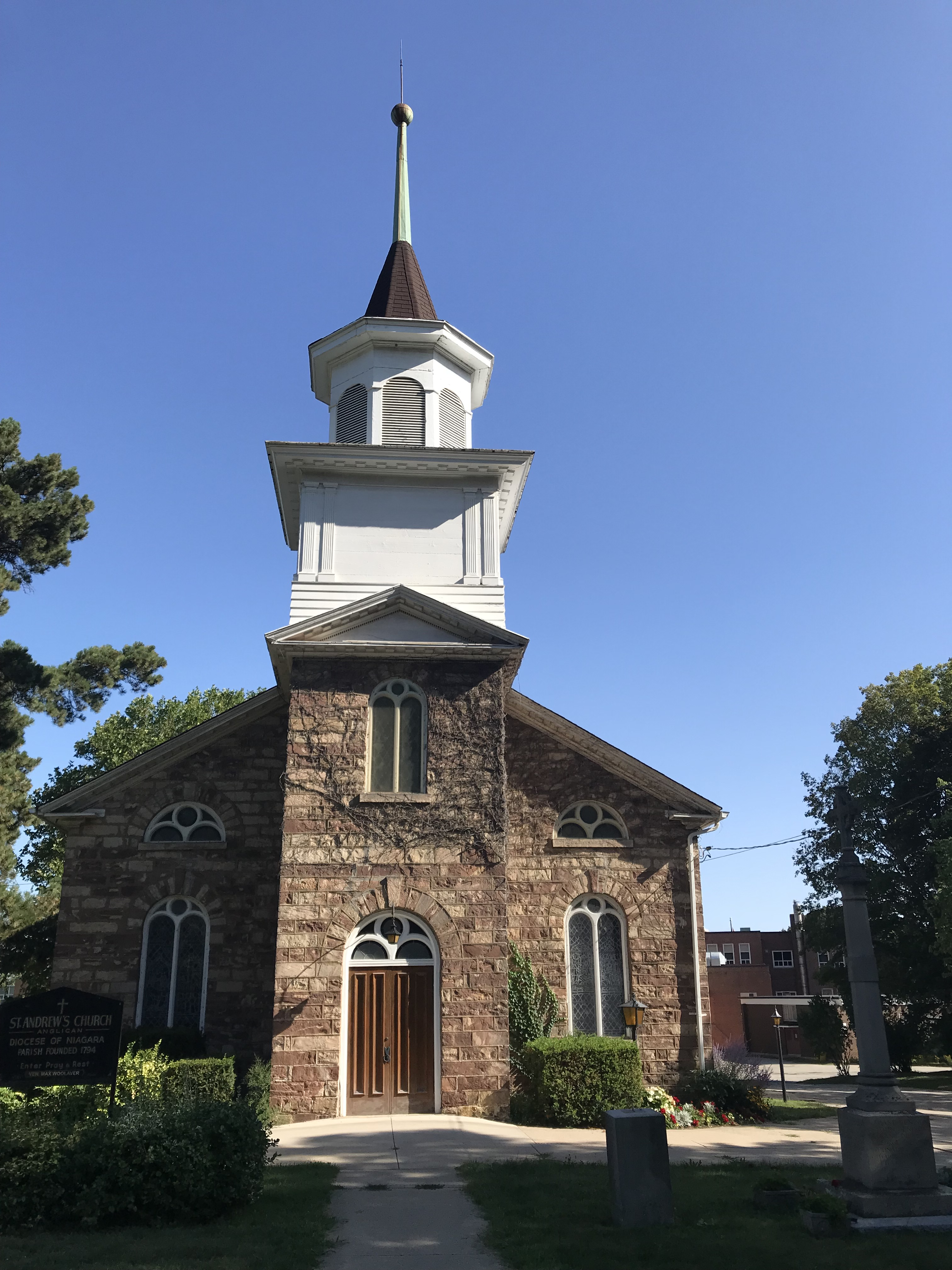
St Andrew's Anglican Church, built in 1825, est. 1794

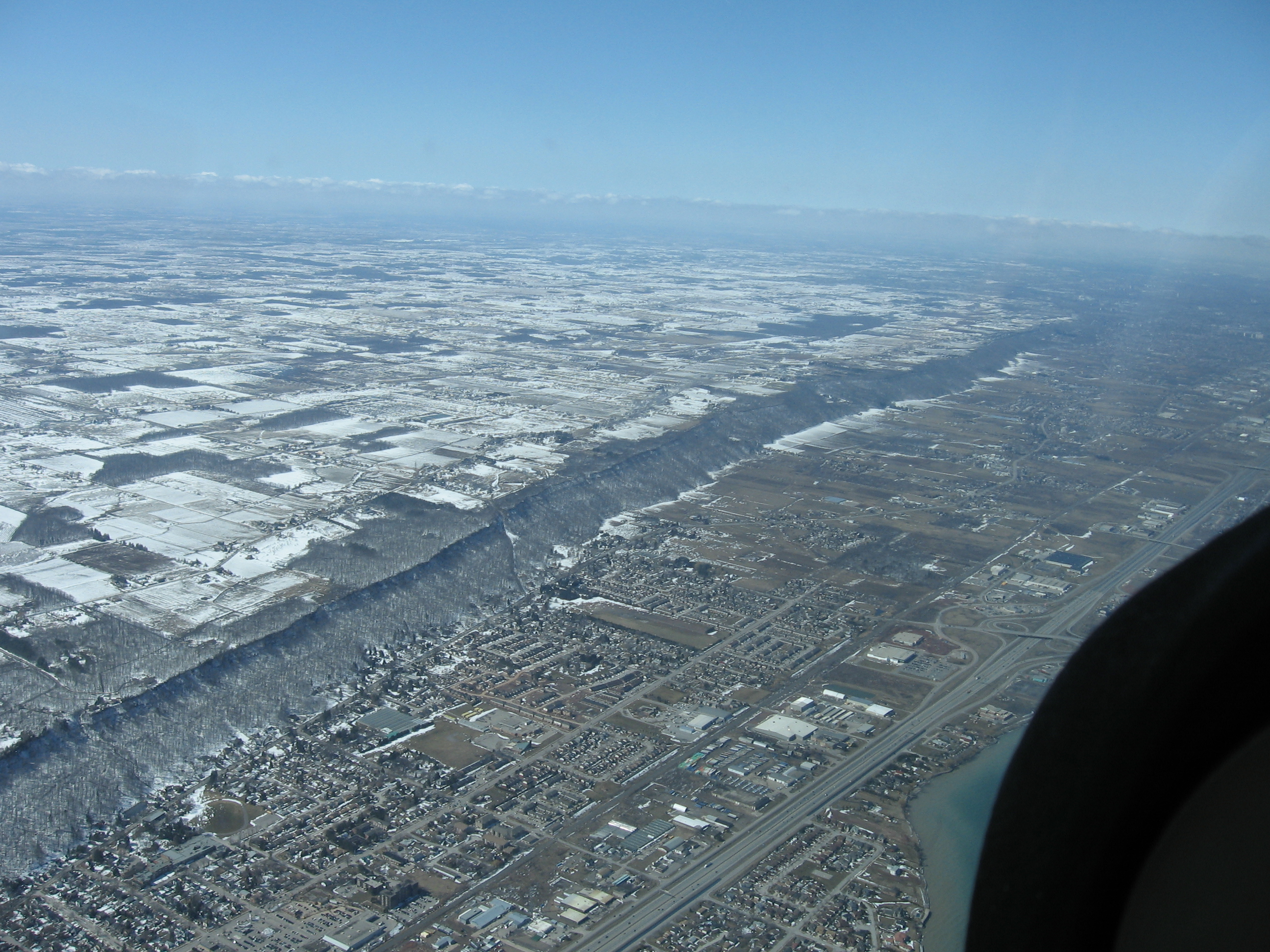
Aerial view of Grimsby

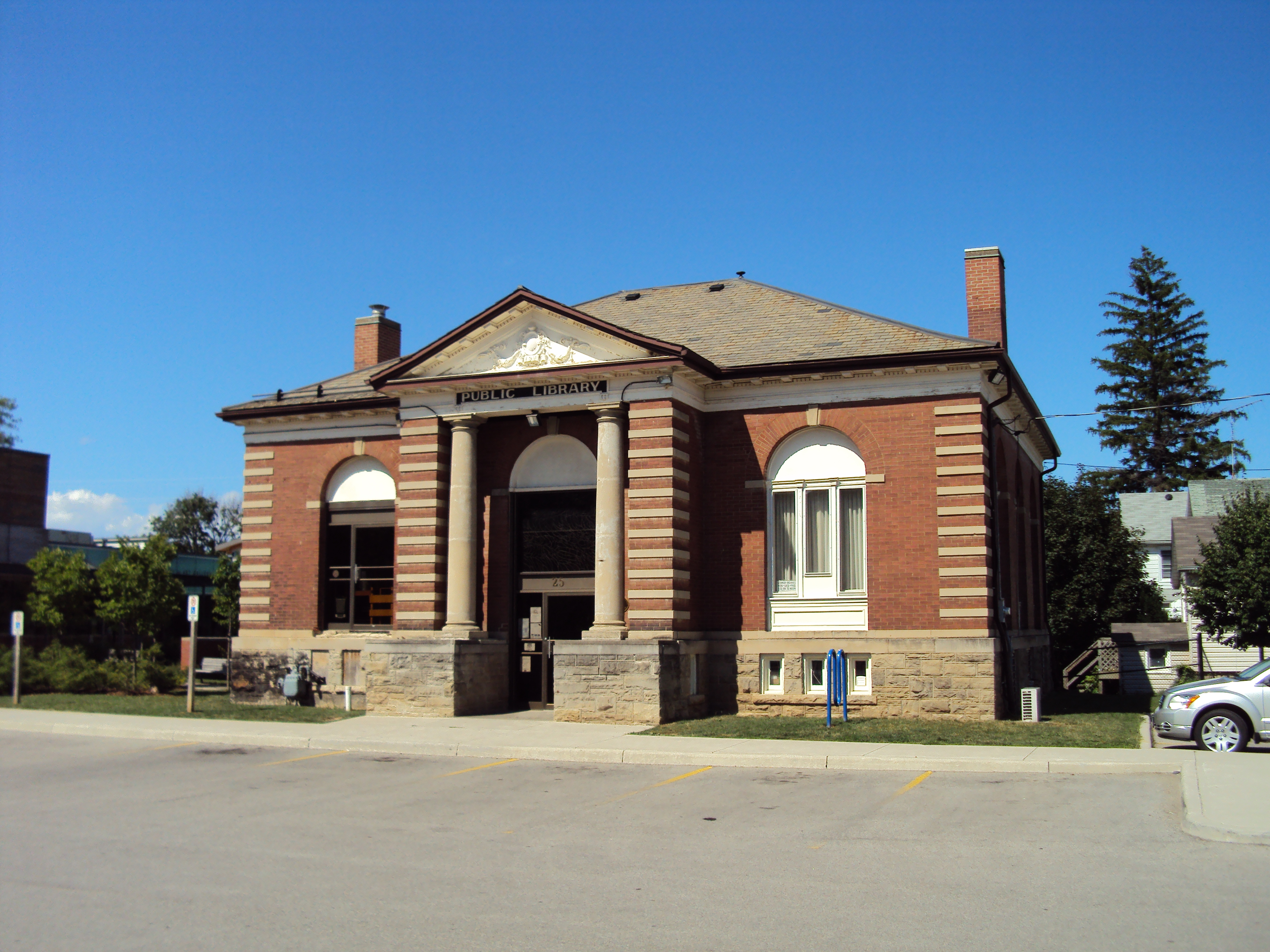
The former Grimsby Public Library

Grimsby Town Council is composed of a mayor and eight councillors who serve for a term of four years. The mayor is elected at large, and the councillors are elected by ward. The town is divided into four wards, with two councillors elected in each ward. It is the role of the council to represent the public and to consider the well-being and interests of the municipality; to develop and evaluate policies and programs; to determine which services the municipality provides; to ensure administrative practices and procedures are in place to implement the decisions of council; and to maintain the financial integrity of the municipality. The council generally meets on the first and third Mondays of each month. All meetings are open to the public and are also televised live on the local Government-access television (GATV) cable TV channel.

The current council (2018-2022 term) was sworn in on December 3, 2018, with the following members:

Mayor

- Jeff A. Jordan

Town council members Ward 1

- Councillor Reg Freake
- Councillor Delight Davoli

Town council members Ward 2

- Councillor Don Howe
- Councillor Lianne Vardy

Town council members Ward 3

- Councillor Veronica Charrois
- Councillor Jennifer Korstanje

Town council members Ward 4

- Councillor Nick DiFlavio
- Councillor Jacob Baradziej

The Regional Municipality of Niagara is an upper-tier municipality that encompasses all municipalities in Niagara Region. On Niagara Regional Council, Grimsby is represented by the mayor and by an elected regional councillor, currently Michelle Seaborn.

== Transportation ==
Bisecting the town is the Queen Elizabeth Way, one of the 400-series highways. It has three interchanges in the town, with Casablanca Boulevard in the west, a central interchange for three roads (Christie Street, Ontario Street, and Maple Avenue), and Bartlett Avenue in the east.

The Grimsby station, on the south side of the railway tracks west of Ontario Street and south of Queen Elizabeth Way, is served by the Maple Leaf train jointly operated by Via Rail and Amtrak. A GO Transit train station is planned for operation on the Lakeshore West line, was expected to open in 2021 as part of the Lakeshore West Line, and was halted as of late 2018. Of three sites for the Grimsby GO Station evaluated by Metrolinx, the Crown agency that operates GO Transit, the preferred site for the proposed station is west of and adjacent to Casablanca Boulevard.

In August 2020, Niagara Region Transit launched a two-year pilot to provide on-demand local and regional transit service for Grimsby and other nearby communities.

Grimsby Regional Airport, a private aerodrome for small aircraft, is located about 6 km southwest of the town centre.

== Schools ==
=== Secondary schools ===
- West Niagara Secondary School (operated by DSBN)
- Blessed Trinity Catholic Secondary School (operated by NCDSB)

=== Primary schools ===
- Central French Immersion Public School
- Grand Ave. Public School
- Lakeview Public School
- Nelles Public School
- Our Lady of Fatima Catholic School
- Park Public School
- Smith Public School
- St. Joseph Catholic School

== Grimsby Public Library ==
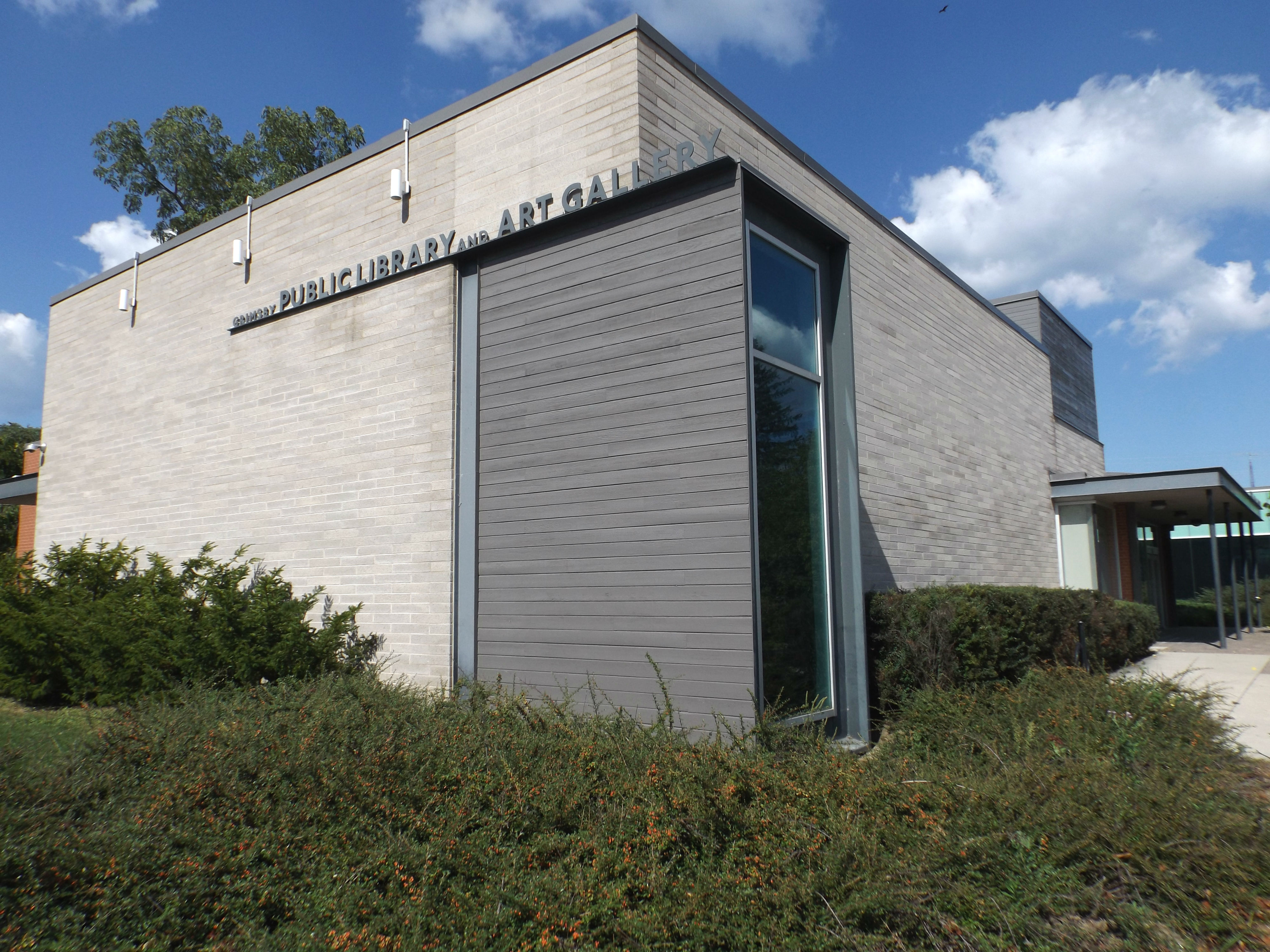
Grimsby Public Library and Art Gallery

The first library in Grimsby was opened in 1871 in the home of Grimsby councillor Sam Mabey, housing a collection of 1,000 books. Following a recommendation of the town council, the village struck a committee to approach the Andrew Carnegie Foundation to request new funds to build a new library. The foundation allocated $8,000 to build the new library building. In 1975, the library was expanded to include a new building, which inaugurated a Grimsby Public Art Gallery in the basement of the library. A few years later, the Klosso Eloul sculpture 'Double is One' was installed on the grounds. In 2004, a new building was constructed adjacent to the original structure to house both the library and art gallery. The original structure itself contains the Grimsby Archives.

== Grimsby Beach ==
Grimsby beach is home to "Gingerbread Houses" that are painted by owners in bright colours and flourishes for an eye-catching addition to the area.

== Demographics ==
Grimsby Historical populations
Year	Pop.	±%
1871	800	—
1901	1,001	+25.1%
1911	1,669	+66.7%
1921	2,004	+20.1%
1931	2,198	+9.7%
1941	2,331	+6.1%
1951	2,773	+19.0%
1961	5,148	+85.6%
1971	15,770	+206.3%
1981	15,797	+0.2%
1991	18,520	+17.2%
2001	21,297	+15.0%
2006	23,937	+12.4%
2011	25,325	+5.8%
2016	27,314	+7.9%
2021	28,883	+5.7%

In the 2021 Census of Population conducted by Statistics Canada, Grimsby had a population of 28,883 living in 11,395 of its 11,626 total private dwellings, a change of 5.7% from its 2016 population of 27,314. With a land area of 68.71 km^{2} (26.53 sq mi), it had a population density of 420.4/km^{2} (1,088.7/sq mi) in 2021.

Age characteristics of Grimsby (2016)	Total	Male	Female
Total - All persons	27,315	13,315	14,000
Age 0-14	4,750	2,485	2,270
Age 15-64	17,300	8,440	8,860
Age 65-84	5,265	2,390	2,870

== Climate ==
Grimsby's climate varies throughout the year; 12 °C – 15 °C in the spring, 21 °C – 33 °C in the summer, and 10 °C – 17 °C in the fall. Temperatures in the winter months are around 4 °C to −16 °C, with about 190 cm of snow per year.

Climate data for Grimsby Mountain; elevation: 170.5 m (559 ft) (1991–2020 normals, extremes 1910–present)
Month	Jan	Feb	Mar	Apr	May	Jun	Jul	Aug	Sep	Oct	Nov	Dec	Year
Record high °C (°F)	17.8 (64.0)	19.7 (67.5)	27.0 (80.6)	30.6 (87.1)	37.2 (99.0)	36.1 (97.0)	41.1 (106.0)	40.6 (105.1)	38.3 (100.9)	32.0 (89.6)	25.8 (78.4)	21.0 (69.8)	41.1 (106.0)
Mean daily maximum °C (°F)	0.0 (32.0)	1.0 (33.8)	5.6 (42.1)	12.1 (53.8)	19.7 (67.5)	24.8 (76.6)	27.9 (82.2)	26.7 (80.1)	22.8 (73.0)	15.6 (60.1)	8.9 (48.0)	2.7 (36.9)	14.0 (57.2)
Daily mean °C (°F)	−3.8 (25.2)	−3.3 (26.1)	1.3 (34.3)	7.2 (45.0)	14.0 (57.2)	19.5 (67.1)	22.6 (72.7)	21.6 (70.9)	18.0 (64.4)	11.3 (52.3)	4.9 (40.8)	−0.5 (31.1)	9.4 (48.9)
Mean daily minimum °C (°F)	−7.6 (18.3)	−7.5 (18.5)	−3 (27)	2.3 (36.1)	8.4 (47.1)	14.2 (57.6)	17.4 (63.3)	16.6 (61.9)	13.2 (55.8)	7.0 (44.6)	0.9 (33.6)	−3.7 (25.3)	4.9 (40.8)
Record low °C (°F)	−27.8 (−18.0)	−29.4 (−20.9)	−22.8 (−9.0)	−17.2 (1.0)	−4.4 (24.1)	1.7 (35.1)	5.6 (42.1)	1.1 (34.0)	−0.6 (30.9)	−9.4 (15.1)	−15.6 (3.9)	−28.9 (−20.0)	−29.4 (−20.9)
Average precipitation mm (inches)	72.6 (2.86)	69.8 (2.75)	77.1 (3.04)	100.9 (3.97)	80.9 (3.19)	83.2 (3.28)	79.3 (3.12)	77.2 (3.04)	76.6 (3.02)	101.8 (4.01)	75.4 (2.97)	85.3 (3.36)	980.1 (38.59)
Average rainfall mm (inches)	43.0 (1.69)	29.7 (1.17)	51.1 (2.01)	92.6 (3.65)	80.9 (3.19)	83.2 (3.28)	79.3 (3.12)	77.2 (3.04)	76.6 (3.02)	101.4 (3.99)	66.2 (2.61)	54.3 (2.14)	835.5 (32.89)
Average snowfall cm (inches)	34.6 (13.6)	38.7 (15.2)	22.0 (8.7)	6.2 (2.4)	0.0 (0.0)	0.0 (0.0)	0.0 (0.0)	0.0 (0.0)	0.0 (0.0)	0.1 (0.0)	8.1 (3.2)	30.1 (11.9)	139.8 (55.0)
Average rainy days (≥ 0 mm)	7	5	10	14	16	15	14	13	12	18	12	9	146
Average snowy days (≥ 0 cm)	21	17	11	5	0	0	0	0	0	1	7	16	78
Average relative humidity (%)	75	73	69	67	68	70	70	72	74	76	75	78	62
Mean monthly sunshine hours	72	119	182	205	255	256	246	219	180	129	81	48	1,992
Source: Environment Canada

== See also ==
- List of townships in Ontario
