= Beamsville District Secondary School =

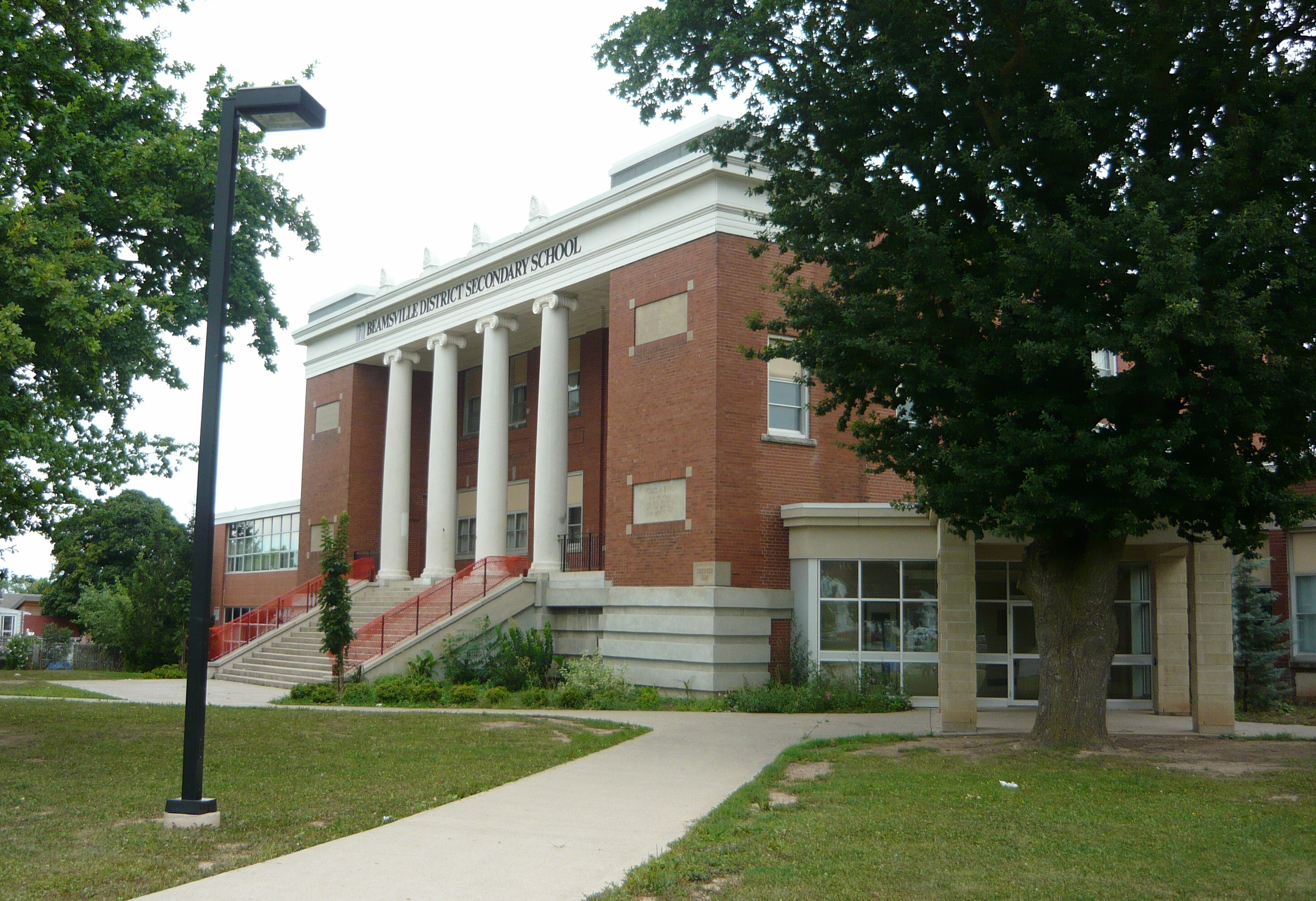

Location
- 4317 Central Avenue; Beamsville, Ontario, L0R 1B0; Canada; 43.1674°N 79.4734°W

Information
- School type: Secondary School
- Founded: 1888
- Closed: 2022
- School board: District School Board of Niagara
- Grades: 9-12
- Language: English
- Area: Beamsville, Ontario
- Colours: Green and Gold
- Mascot: Buccaneers
- Website: beamsvilless.dsbn.org

Beamsville District Secondary School was a secondary school in Beamsville, Ontario, Canada and was operated by the District School Board of Niagara (DSBN).

== History ==
BDSS had established a long tradition of excellence dating back to 1888, when the very first classes were conducted. Since that time BDSS had continued to offer a wealth of choice in areas of academics, sports and club activities. Academic studies include classes in English, French, Geography, History, Mathematics and Science. Students can also choose from a variety of classes including: the Arts (Music, Art, Drama), Business and Computer Studies, Family Studies, Physical Education and Technological Studies (Transportation, Construction, Electrical, Welding, Manufacturing, Design, Communications, and Horticulture.)

The original building of 1888 was where Jacob Beam public school sits on King St. West at William St. The school then consisted of 3 separate buildings. Wing 1, constructed in 1917 with additions in 1924 and 1963. Wing 2 was constructed in 1958 and Wing 3 was built in 1963. Wing 3 is home to labs, technology shops, and the large second gym. Although designed as free standing structures, the three wings are interconnected by an elevated walkway between Wing 1 and Wing 2.

The 1917 component of the school was designed by noted architect Walter William LaChance, who had written two books on school architecture. He also wrote an article in an architectural magazine about his design for this school.

In the fall of 2002, the high school started a $6.5 million renovation and rebuilding project. One of the most visible renovations was the creation of a front entrance for the school. The new entrance provided a front foyer and new, better functioning office space. The front steps to the building, which were covered over more than 69 years ago, were uncovered and refurbished, now drawing one's eyes up to the massive pillars of the original building. Less visible is the much larger renovation to infrastructure such as electrical, plumbing, heating and ventilation systems which improve both the safety and comfort of the school, as well as a new sprung hardwood gym floor in the large gym. Other notable renovations are evident in the original gymnasium and performance area, as well as in classes such as the welding shop.

The school was designated as a heritage property by the town of Lincoln on September 18, 2017.

== Notable alumni ==
- George Hudson, Canadian Football League player
- Ryan Christie (ice hockey) National Hockey League player
- Tonya Verbeek, Olympic wrestler

== Closure ==
On March 28, 2017, the District School Board of Niagara (DSBN) voted in favour of a motion to close three high schools, including Beamsville District Secondary School, in favour of a single large high school to be constructed at a location that was not determined at the time. In the initial plan, Beamsville District Secondary School would close in 2020 following the 2019–2020 school year, and the new amalgamated high school would open in September 2020. However, due to the COVID-19 pandemic, plans had to be postponed. In 2022, the school officially closed and was no longer in operation, but since the construction of the new high school, West Niagara Secondary School, was not complete, the building was open for students but were considered West Niagara students already. In 2023, construction of West Niagara was complete and the building was closed for students. The Chief Administrative Officer of Lincoln stated that there was plans for the building that would see the school become a community hub, where different not-for-profits, regional services and municipal services, could be housed.

Many groups were vocal in opposing the closure and amalgamation plans. The Town of Grimsby, as well as the Town of Lincoln, both passed motions voicing opposition. Niagara West-Glanbrook Member of Provincial Parliament Sam Oosterhoff, himself a recent high school graduate, also voiced opposition to the amalgamation plans, and has spoken in the Ontario Legislative Assembly in favour of a moratorium on school closures. On Wednesday, March 29, 2017, students at South Lincoln High School walked out of class in protest over the closure and amalgamation plans (which affected South Lincoln High School as well as Grimsby Secondary School and Beamsville District Secondary School).

== See also ==
- Education in Ontario
- List of secondary schools in Ontario
