= Niagara District Secondary School =

Location
- 1875 Niagara Stone Road; Niagara-on-the-Lake, Ontario; Canada; 43.235°N 79.105°W

Information
- School type: Secondary school
- Founded: 1957
- Closed: 2010
- School board: District School Board of Niagara
- Principal: Mr. M. Cockburn
- Grades: 9-12
- Enrollment: 265 (2009)
- Language: English
- Colour: Burgundy (Maroon)and Metallic Blue
- Team name: Trojans

Niagara District Secondary School (NDSS) was a public secondary school located in Niagara-on-the-Lake, Ontario, Canada.

== History ==
Opened in 1957 by the then Niagara Town and Township High School Board, NDSS featured a specialized arts program focusing on the dramatic arts, dance, visual arts, and music. It offered the possibility of earning a specialized DNA arts certificate upon graduation.

== Facilities ==
The school is arranged in a P-shaped configuration and has a large track located northeast of the school. Parking is available along Niagara Stone Road and East-West Line.

The school is situated in rural site with residential areas located to the southwest in Virgil, Ontario and northeast in Niagara-on-the-Lake.

== Feeder schools ==
When NDSS was open enrolment was made from graduates from feeder schools in the area:

- Parliament Oak Public School
- Virgil Public School
- Colonel John Butler Public School
- St. Michael's Catholic Elementary School
- St. David's Public School
- Brockview Public School
- Eastwood Public School

== Ministry assessment and closure ==
Around 2008 the Ministry of Education began the process (Accommodation Review Committee or ARC) of determining the future of the school. Based on declining enrollment (drop of 22% for 2008-2009), a decision was made to proceed with closing the school at the end of 2010 academic year after enrollment failed to reach the threshold of 350 as outline in 2009 ARC process along with complicated battle between the community and the District School Board of Niagara.

The school was hampered by the aging population and drop in younger residents in the area when compared with other schools in the area.

Students once served by the school were re-directed to Laura Secord Secondary School in St. Catharines and A. N. Myer Secondary School in Niagara Falls, Ontario.

== Site today ==
Located at 1875 Niagara Stone Road, it is now used as Niagara-on-the-Lake Resource Centre by the school board.

On Tuesday, January 27, 2015 the town of Niagara-on-the-Lake and the District School Board of Niagara reached an agreement for the town to purchase the 26-ache Niagara District Secondary School site for $1.67 million. The former NDSS property will now remain owned by the town and the sale for the piece of land will close on February 27, 2015.

It is now the site of the Royal Elite International Academy.

== Notable alumni ==
- Malin Åkerman, a Swedish-born Canadian film actress and model who briefly attended the school
- Bill Danychuk, Canadian Football League player and all-star offensive lineman
