= South Lincoln High School =

Location
- 260 Canborough Street; Smithville, Ontario, L0R 2A0; Canada; 43.0952°N 79.5490°W

Information
- School type: Secondary School
- Founded: 1954
- School board: District School Board of Niagara
- Grades: 9-12
- Language: English
- Area: Smithville, Ontario
- Colours: Purple and Gold
- Mascot: Bears
- Website: southlincoln.dsbn.org

South Lincoln High School was a secondary school in Smithville, Ontario, Canada.

In 2017 it had about 230 students.

== History ==
South Lincoln High School was the third and last public high school located in Smithville, Ontario. The first high school was an ungraded one room school, part of the three-room Canborough Street School. The second, known as Smithville High School, was replaced by South Lincoln in 1954.

Like its predecessors, South Lincoln became an elementary school once secondary education was discontinued at the site.

== Closure ==
The school closed for the 2017-2018 school year due to the DSBN plans to building one high school for all three West-Niagara Secondary Schools. It closed while many rural schools in the province were threatened with closure. Students unsuccessfully campaigned against its closure. In January 2019, the school building opened as the new Smithville Public School, replacing the existing College Street School.

In the interim, students from College Street (later Smithville Public) and Caistor Central elementary schools were assigned to Grimsby Secondary School. Graduates of Gainsborough Central were sent to E.L. Crossley Secondary School.
