= Bill Danychuk =

Canadian gridiron football player (1940–2019)

Profile
- Position: Guard

Personal information
- Born: August 29, 1940; Timmins, Ontario, Canada
- Died: December 27, 2019 (aged 79); St. Catharines, Ontario, Canada
- Listed height: 6 ft 3 in (1.91 m)
- Listed weight: 240 lb (109 kg)

Career information
- High school: Niagara District Secondary School
- College: Tennessee

Career history
- 1964–1975: Hamilton Tiger-Cats

Awards and highlights
- 3× Grey Cup champion (1965, 1967, 1972); 2× CFL All-Star (1968, 1970); 5× CFL East All-Star (1967, 1968, 1970, 1972, 1973)

William D'Arcy Danychuk (August 29, 1940 – December 27, 2019) was an all-star offensive lineman in the Canadian Football League. The two-time CFL All-Star played from 1964 to 1975 for the Hamilton Tiger-Cats. Danychuk was a part of three Grey Cup Championship teams during his time with Hamilton.

He was born in northern Ontario and moved to Niagara-on-the-Lake from Quebec in his teens. Danychuk attended Niagara District Secondary School during the first years the school opened and began his football career there that eventually led him to the CFL. Also, while attending high school, Danychuk was a founding member of Beta Tau chapter, Gamma Sigma Fraternity International. He died from cancer in 2019 at the age of 79.

== Sources ==
- "Tiger-Cats to Add Danychuk to Wall of Honour" (Press release). CFL.ca. September 28, 2006.
