= Shawn Spears =

Canadian professional wrestler (born 1981)

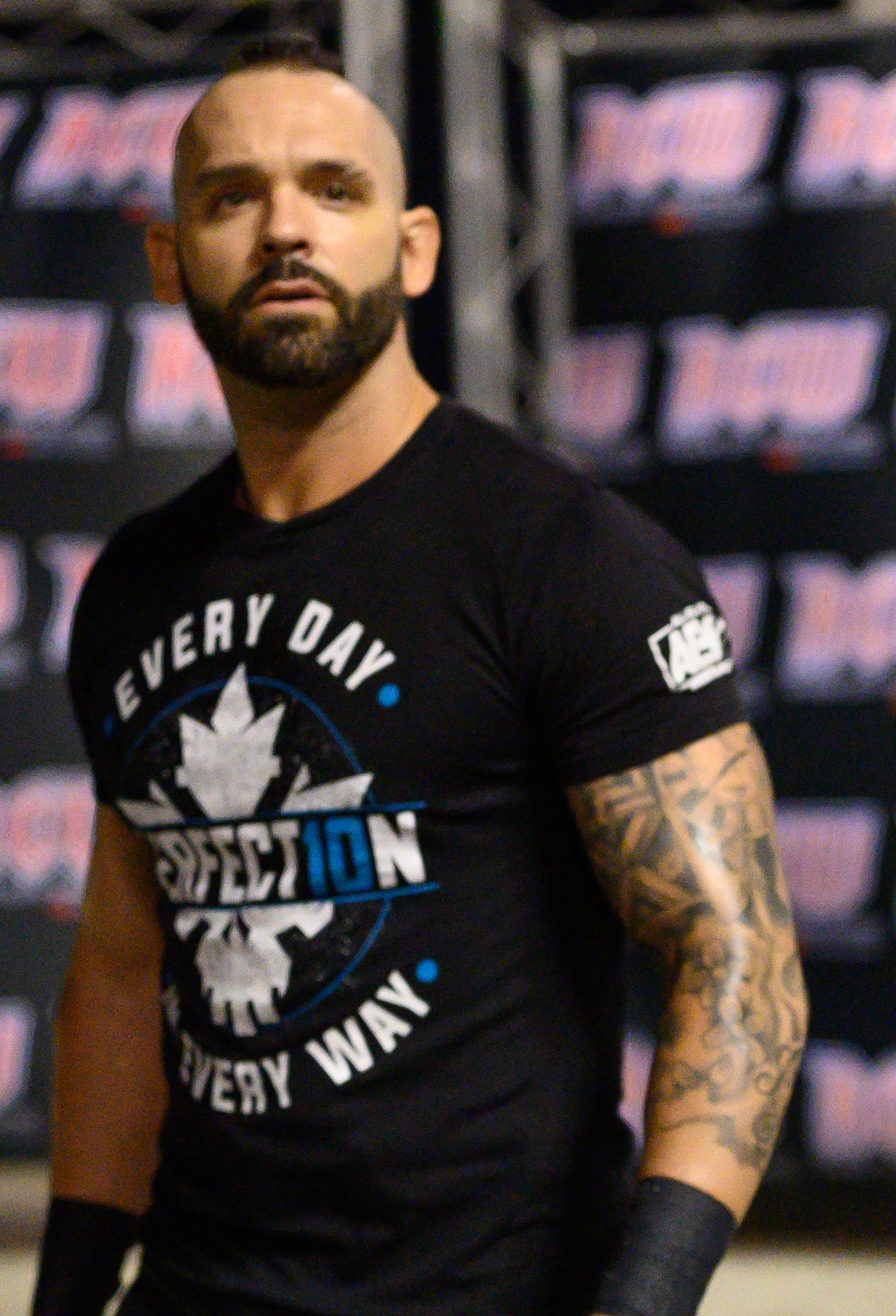
- Spears in 2019

Personal information
- Born: Ronnie William Arneill; February 19, 1981 (age 45) St. Catharines, Ontario, Canada
- Spouse: Cassie Lee (m. 2019)
- Children: 2

Professional wrestling career
- Ring name(s): Gavin Spears; Shawn Spears; Stan; Tye Dillinger
- Billed height: 6 ft 3 in (1.91 m)
- Billed weight: 223 lb (101 kg)
- Billed from: Niagara Falls, Ontario, Canada
- Trained by: Cody Deaner; Derek Wylde; Eric Young
- Debut: March 2002

Ronnie William Arneill (born February 19, 1981), better known by his ring name Shawn Spears, is a Canadian professional wrestler and trainer. He is signed to WWE, where he performs on the NXT brand and is a former one-time NXT North American Champion. He also serves as a coach at the WWE Performance Center. He is known for his time in All Elite Wrestling (AEW) from 2019 to 2023.

Having begun his career on the independent circuit in 2002 as Shawn Spears, Arneill initially joined WWE in 2006 and worked for the company between 2006 and 2009, performing in the developmental territories Ohio Valley Wrestling (OVW) and Florida Championship Wrestling (FCW) as well as briefly on the main roster brand ECW under the slightly modified ring name Gavin Spears. After being released from WWE in 2009, he returned to the independent scene, before rejoining WWE in 2013 where he was assigned to NXT under the new gimmick of Tye Dillinger. After a rise in popularity, he was promoted to the main roster in April 2017, working on the SmackDown brand until his second release from the company in February 2019.

Shortly after leaving WWE, he signed with the newly founded AEW in May 2019, reverting to his Shawn Spears name. After his AEW contract expired at the end of 2023, Arneill rejoined WWE in February 2024 and was assigned once more to the NXT brand, retaining the Shawn Spears character.

== Early life ==
Born and raised in St. Catharines, Ontario, Arneill attended Laura Secord Secondary School. He played hockey for over ten years until he decided to leave the sport and enter professional wrestling. During his childhood, he was a fan of Rick Rude, Rick Martel, and Mr. Perfect.

== Professional wrestling career ==
=== Early career (2002–2006) ===
Arneill trained at the Hart Wrestling School in Cambridge Ontario with Smith Hart, Ike Shaw and Waldo Von Erich and then with Eric Young at the WrestlePlex school before receiving further training from Derek Wylde and Cody Deaner. Upon wrestling his debut match in March 2002 as Shawn Spears, he began wrestling for some of the biggest independent wrestling promotions throughout Ontario and the United States, including Border City Wrestling, World Xtreme Wrestling, and Blood Sweat and Ears. On February 27, 2005, Arneill made an appearance on an edition of WWE Heat, unsuccessfully teaming with Mikael Yamaha to face The Hurricane and Rosey.

=== World Wrestling Entertainment (2006–2009) ===
After sending a tape to World Wrestling Entertainment (WWE) officials, Arneill was called for a try-out in Buffalo, New York. He was signed to a developmental contract by WWE following the tryout, on January 21, 2006.

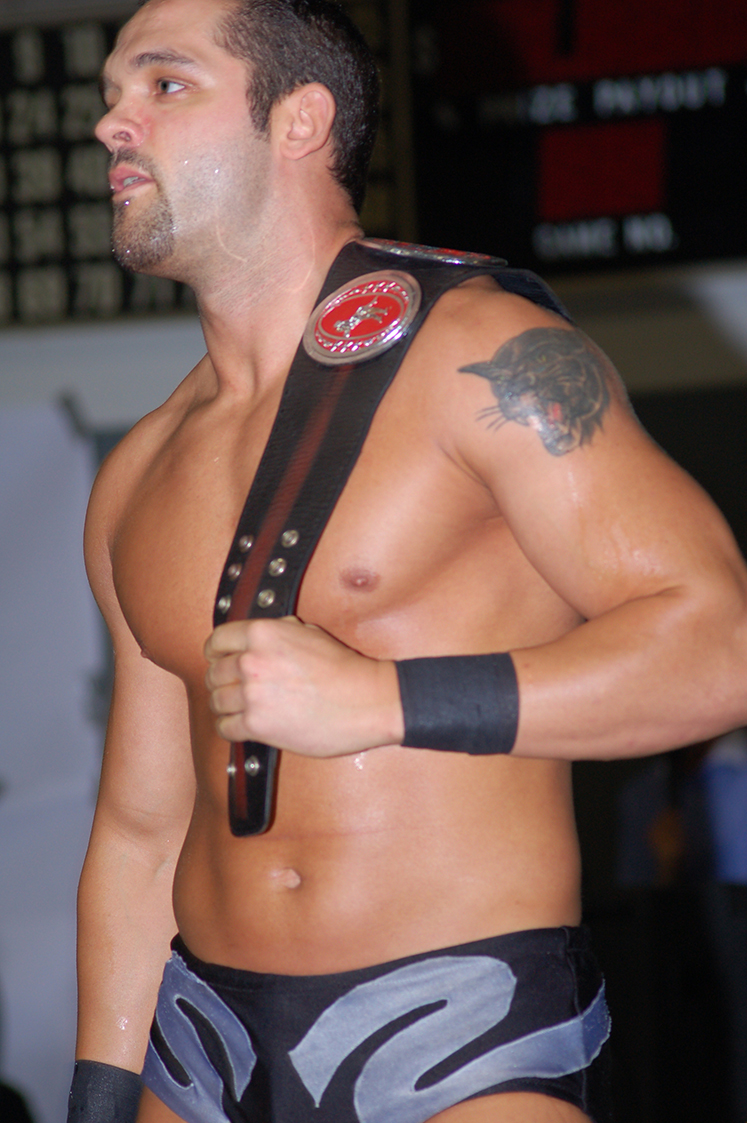
Spears with the OVW Southern Tag Team Championship in December 2007

After signing his WWE contract, Arneill was assigned to the company's developmental territory, Ohio Valley Wrestling (OVW). He made his OVW television debut as "The Canadian Sensation" Shawn Spears, where he defeated then-SmackDown! superstar Simon Dean. After his victory, Dean attacked Spears until Spears was saved by Al Snow, who fended off Dean with a chair. After his debut, Spears quickly made an impact in OVW with a short undefeated streak that was soon ended by Aaron "The Idol" Stevens when Stevens made Spears submit. After this, Spears formed a tag team with Cody Runnels and they feuded with The Throwbacks for the Southern Tag Team Championship. On November 5, 2006, Spears appeared at Cyber Sunday as a backstage producer named Stan; in a comedic segment between Triple H and Shawn Michaels, who superkicked him while discussing "controversy" with Triple H, before proceeding to superkick several more staff members, much to Triple H's amusement. On December 15, 2006, Spears and Runnels won the title from The Throwbacks.

On March 17, 2007, Spears won the OVW Television Championship from Boris Alexiev, his first singles title in OVW. Soon after winning the title, he became more focused on championships and even began trying to steal Runnels' OVW Heavyweight Championship opportunity. During Runnels' OVW Heavyweight Championship match, Spears interfered and performed a piledriver to Runnels, preventing him from winning the OVW Heavyweight Championship and thus solidifying his heel turn. Spears then began feuding with Runnels and eventually lost the OVW Television Championship to him on July 6, 2007 before winning it back one week later. He once again lost the title on September 19 to the debuting Ted "Manbeast" McNailer. Spears later regained the OVW Television Championship only to lose it to Colt Cabana. Spears then began feuding with Cabana and the pair went on to win the vacant OVW Southern Tag Team Championship with on November 7 after defeating Paul Burchill and Stu Sanders. On December 19, Cabana and Spears' feud culminated in a ladder match in which the winner would claim the OVW Southern Tag Team Championship for themselves and choose a new partner. Spears lost to Cabana, who then chose Charles "The Hammer" Evans as his new tag team partner.

After OVW split with WWE, Spears debuted in WWE's new development territory, Florida Championship Wrestling (FCW), and teamed up with Nic Nemeth to defeat The Puerto Rican Nightmares for the FCW Florida Tag Team Championship on August 17. Nearly a month later, Nemeth and Spears lost the title to Joe Hennig and Heath Miller on September 11.

On the August 19 episode of ECW, Spears made his WWE television debut as a heel under the name Gavin Spears as part of Theodore Long's "New Superstar Initiative" in a losing effort to Ricky Ortiz. After his ECW debut, Spears began splitting time between ECW and FCW. On the September 2 edition of ECW, Spears was defeated by Super Crazy. After a three-month absence due to competing in FCW, Spears returned to television on the December 16 episode of ECW, where he lost to Finlay in what turned out to be his final match for the company. On January 9, 2009, Arneill was released from his contract.

=== Independent circuit (2009–2013) ===
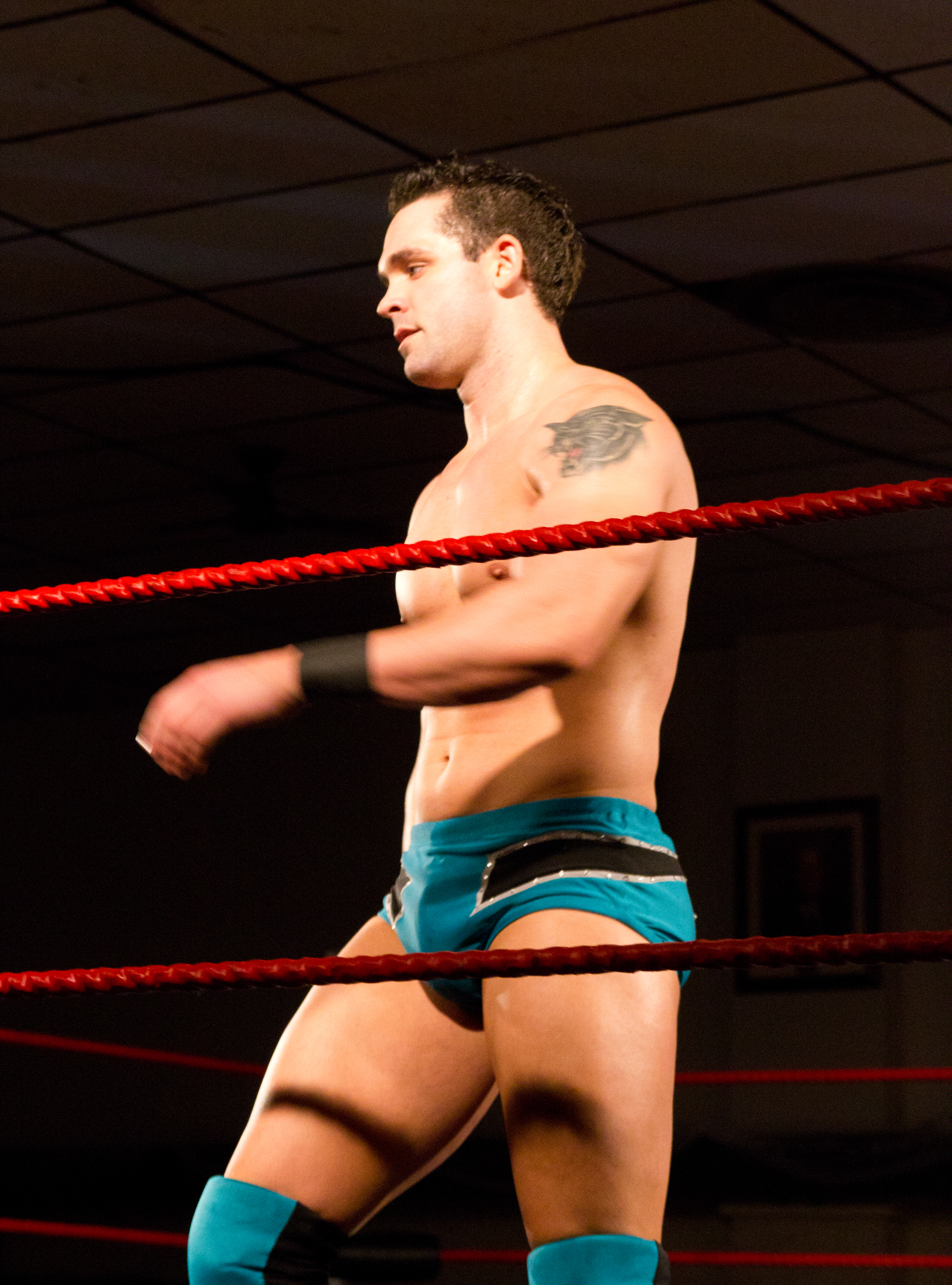
Spears in 2011

The day before he had been released from WWE, Arneill had broken his hand, and was unable to wrestle for 12 weeks following his release as a result. On May 27, 2009, Spears wrestled and lost to fellow WWE alumnus Elijah Burke in a tryout dark match for Total Nonstop Action Wrestling at their Impact! television tapings. On June 12, Spears made an appearance for Ring of Honor (ROH), where he defeated Alex Payne.

On May 16, 2010, Arneill, under his Gavin Spears ring name, teamed up with El Hijo de L.A. Park in a losing effort to Dr. Wagner III and Gigante Extassis on an Extreme Air Wrestle show in Mexico, marking his first tour of Mexico. On May 28 and 29, Arneill made appearances at the 2010 Anime North convention.

On August 15, he teamed up with Idol Stevens to capture the WWC World Tag Team Championship after defeating Thunder and Lightning. On October 31, Spears and Stevens lost the World Tag Team Title back to Thunder and Lightning.

=== Return to WWE (2013–2019) ===
==== NXT (2013–2017) ====
On September 15, 2013, it was reported that Spears had re-signed with WWE, and he was assigned to WWE's developmental territory NXT under the ring name Tye Dillinger. He made his televised NXT debut in a losing effort against Mojo Rawley. In early 2014, Dillinger formed a tag team with Jason Jordan, with the two described as a pair of blue chip athletes. The team of Dillinger and Jordan got their first televised win on the April 17 episode of NXT, defeating Baron Corbin and Sawyer Fulton. On the June 5 episode of NXT, Dillinger and Jordan defeated local competitors. On the August 7 episode of NXT, Dillinger and Jordan lost in the first round of a NXT Tag Team Championship tournament to Enzo Amore and Colin Cassady. Dillinger and Jordan then appeared infrequently together, with Dillinger mostly being used as enhancement talent. On the February 25, 2015 episode of NXT, Dillinger's partnership with Jordan officially ended when Jordan, unhappy with his partner not initially tagging him in, jumped off the apron and walked out on Dillinger just as he went to make the tag. After the match, an enraged Dillinger called out his old partner but instead was met with a quick loss to Baron Corbin.

On the August 12 episode of NXT, Dillinger debuted a new gimmick as the "Perfect 10" and defeated Solomon Crowe. He faced the debuting Apollo Crews at NXT TakeOver: Brooklyn and another debuting Andrade "Cien" Almas at NXT TakeOver: The End, but he lost both matches. On the September 28, 2016 episode of NXT, Dillinger was approached by Bobby Roode, who proposed the two team up for the Dusty Rhodes Tag Team Classic, which Dillinger accepted. On the October 12 episode of NXT, Roode walked out on Dillinger during a tag team match against SAnitY (Alexander Wolfe and Sawyer Fulton), resulting in the team losing in the first round. The following week on NXT, Dillinger called out Roode for a match at NXT TakeOver: Toronto, thus turning face in the process. At the event, Dillinger lost to Roode.

On the December 14 episode of NXT, Dillinger defeated Eric Young by disqualification in a number one contender's Fatal 4-Way qualifying match. At NXT TakeOver: San Antonio, Dillinger was defeated by Young following a distraction from Alexander Wolfe and Killian Dain. At NXT TakeOver: Orlando, Dillinger teamed up with Roderick Strong, Kassius Ohno and Ruby Riot to take on SAnitY in an 8-person mixed tag team match in a losing effort. Dillinger made his last NXT appearance on the April 5 tapings, closing out the event by winning a Steel Cage match against Eric Young.

==== SmackDown (2017–2019) ====
On January 29, 2017, at Royal Rumble, Dillinger was a surprise entrant in the Royal Rumble match, entering at number 10 but was eliminated by Braun Strowman. Dillinger entered a short feud with Aiden English, defeating him on various episodes of SmackDown Live, leading to matches at Backlash and Battleground, where Dillinger was defeated. He also participated on three matches for AJ Style's United States Championship, but he didn't win the title.

He also participated on the PPVs Fastlane, WrestleMania 34, and, his final pay-per-view appearance, the Greatest Royal Rumble. Dillinger suffered a hand injury in October 2018 which kept him out of action for several months. He returned to in-ring competition at a house show on February 9, 2019; however, he was still not used on television. On February 19, 2019, Dillinger announced in a Twitter statement that he had requested his release from WWE and was granted on February 22, 2019.

=== All Elite Wrestling (2019–2023) ===
==== "The Chairman of AEW" (2019–2020) ====
Arneill, under his previous name of Shawn Spears, debuted for All Elite Wrestling (AEW) at their inaugural pay-per-view event Double or Nothing, competing in the pre-show Casino Battle Royale that Adam Page won. In an interview with Sports Illustrated, Spears stated he would be appearing with the promotion going forward. AEW officially announced his signing on June 12. At Fyter Fest in June, Spears established himself as a heel after hitting Cody with a steel chair shot to the top of the head, which legitimately drew blood after a mistake. Going forward he began calling himself "The Chairman of AEW". At All Out on August 31, Spears unsuccessfully faced Cody in a singles match. Leading to All Out, Spears aligned with Tully Blanchard, who began acting as his manager. Spears then started a feud with Joey Janela, after Janela had disrespected Blanchard. At Full Gear on November 9, Spears defeated Janela. In February 2020, Blanchard and Spears began a campaign to recruit a new tag team partner for Spears. However, the angle was soon dropped due to the COVID-19 pandemic. Shortly after, Spears was used primarily in a comedic role as he mocked Dustin Rhodes and the Rhodes family in a news report parody segment and challenged Dustin Rhodes to a match at Double or Nothing. At Double or Nothing, Spears had his clothes ripped off and was defeated by Dustin Rhodes.

On the June 3 episode of Dynamite, Blanchard returned and berated Spears for making a joke out of himself at Double or Nothing. He then presented him with a black glove, similar to the one worn by Blackjack Mulligan and Ted DiBiase, that can be illegally loaded with a metal slug. Spears made his in-ring return on the June 16 edition of Dark wearing the black glove, scoring a submission victory over Lee Johnson after applying the Sharpshooter on Johnson. Over the months, Spears claimed victories over various competitors, then knocked them out with his loaded black glove. He later disposed of the glove after an interview with AEW commentator Tony Schiavone. In October, Spears began a short feud against Scorpio Sky after taunting him several times before his matches. On the November 11 episode of Dynamite, Spears defeated Sky, ending their feud.

==== The Pinnacle and sporadic appearances (2020–2023) ====
After the December 23 episode of Dynamite, Spears was absent from AEW television, but was present on the stage for the ten-bell salute during the Brodie Lee Celebration of Life on December 30. He made his return on March 3, reuniting with Blanchard and FTR by helping them defeat Jurassic Express. On March 10, Spears, Blanchard and FTR joined a faction led by MJF, later known as The Pinnacle. The Pinnacle began a feud with The Inner Circle, defeating them in a Blood and Guts match at Blood and Guts before losing in a Stadium Stampede match at Double or Nothing. In early 2022, the Pinnacle began to dissolve. Spears continued aligning himself with MJF in the latter's feud against Wardlow. Spears lost to Wardlow on the May 25 episode of Dynamite in a steel cage match, with MJF as special guest referee.

Spears returned on the October 12 episode of Dynamite in Toronto as a face, reverting to his "Perfect 10" gimmick from WWE. During the Zero Hour pre-show of All Out 2023, he participated in the Over The Budget Battle Royal, but was eliminated by Aussie Open. On December 23, Spears announced his departure from AEW, becoming a free agent on January 1, 2024.

=== Second return to WWE (2024–present) ===
At NXT Vengeance Day on February 4, 2024, a mysterious vignette was played. Arneill made his return to WWE in the February 27 episode of NXT, attacking Ridge Holland with a steel chair. Instead of returning as Tye Dillinger, he kept the Shawn Spears name as well as his "Chairman" gimmick from AEW. Spears defeated Uriah Connors on March 5 at NXT: Roadblock. Spears wrestled for the NXT Championship in a fatal four-way match at NXT Heatwave, which was won by Ethan Page.

He began a storyline where he became Brooks Jensen's mentor and formed a stable with Izzi Dame and Niko Vance called The Culling. On the March 4, 2025 episode of NXT, Spears defeated Tony D'Angelo to win the NXT North American Championship. On the April 1 episode of NXT, Spears lost the title to Ricky Saints despite interference from The Culling, ending his reign at 28 days. On the July 22 episode of NXT, The Culling (Spears, Vance, Dame and Tatum Paxley) defeated NXT Tag Team Champions Hank and Tank (Hank Walker and Tank Ledger), Zaria, and WWE Speed Women's and NXT Women's North American Champion Sol Ruca in an eight-person mixed tag team match in The Culling's first match as a whole stable. On the June 23, 2026 episode of NXT, Vance attacked Spears and put him through the announce table as Dame watched, kicking Spears out of the group.

Spears attacked Vance with a steel chair following his match against Shiloh Hill on the July 7 episode of NXT. The two faced off in a singles match on the July 21 episode of NXT, with Spears winning by a disqualification after pretending to have been hit by Vance with a steel chair.

He has also served as a coach at the WWE Performance Center since his return in 2024.

== Other media ==
Arneill, as Tye Dillinger, appears in the video games WWE 2K17 (as downloadable content), WWE 2K18 and WWE 2K19, and as Shawn Spears in WWE 2K25 and WWE 2K26 as a playable character.

== Personal life ==
Arneill married Australian professional wrestler Cassandra McIntosh, better known by her ring names Cassie Lee and Peyton Royce, in August 2019. They have two children.

Arneill and fellow Canadian professional wrestler Mattias Clement, better known by his ring name Tyler Breeze, co-own and run a wrestling school called Flatbacks Wrestling in Apopka, Florida.

== Championship and accomplishments ==
- American Combat Wrestling
  - ACW Heavyweight Championship (1 time)
  - King Of Florida (2010)
- Deadlock Pro-Wrestling
  - DPW Awards (1 time)
    - Match of the Year (2023) vs. Chris Danger at World's Strongest
- Florida Championship Wrestling
  - FCW Florida Tag Team Championship (1 time) – with Nic Nemeth
- Florida Underground Wrestling
  - FUW Tag Team Championship (1 time) – with Kenny Kendrick
- Ground Breaking Pro Wrestling
  - GBPW Championship (1 time)
- Great Lakes Championship Wrestling
  - GLCW Heavyweight Championship (1 time)
- NEO Pro Wrestling
  - NEO Grand Independent Championship (1 time)
- Ohio Valley Wrestling
  - OVW Television Championship (3 times)
  - OVW Southern Tag Team Championship (3 times) – with Cody Runnels (2) and Colt Cabana (1)
- Prairie Wrestling Alliance
  - PWA Commonwealth Championship (1 time)
- Pro Wrestling Illustrated
  - Ranked No. 114 of the top 500 singles wrestlers in the PWI 500 in 2017
- Pure Wrestling Association
  - PWA Pure Wrestling Championship (1 time)
- Tri-City Wrestling
  - TCW Heavyweight Championship (1 time)
- World Series Wrestling
  - WSW World Heavyweight Championship (1 time)
- World Wrestling Council
  - WWC World Tag Team Championship (1 time) – with Idol Stevens
- WWE
  - NXT North American Championship (1 time)
