= Thorold Secondary School =

Coordinates: 43.12933°N 79.19855°W

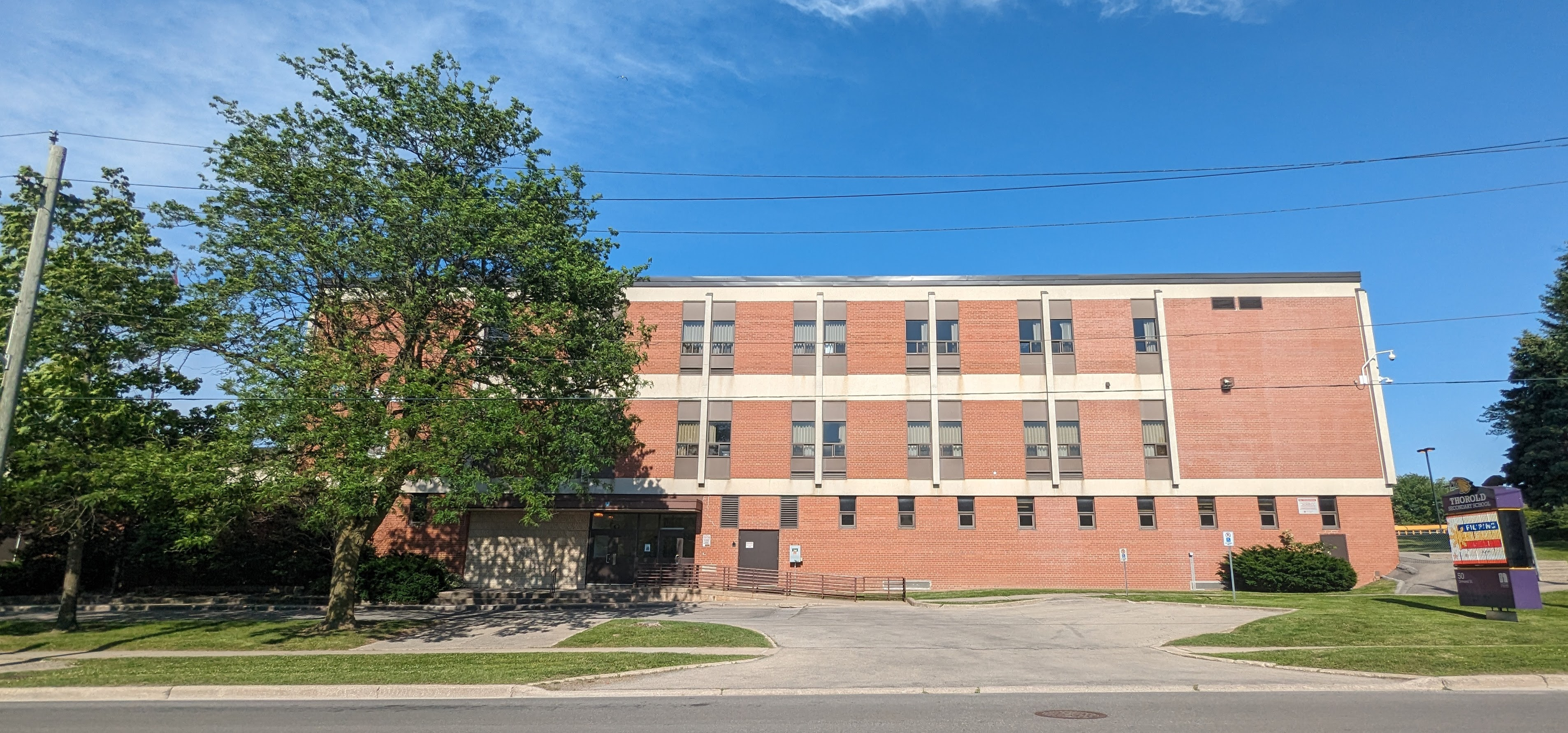
- A photograph of the school taken in 2024.

Location
- 50 Ormond Street North; Thorold, Ontario, L2V 1Z1; Canada

Information
- School type: Public Secondary school
- Motto: Summum Petite (Seek the Highest!)
- Founded: 1875
- School board: District School Board of Niagara
- Superintendent: Leanne Smith
- Area trustee: Nancy Beamer
- Principal: Jessica Folino
- Grades: 9-12
- Language: English
- Area: Thorold, Ontario
- Colours: Purple and Gold
- Website: tss.dsbn.org

Thorold Secondary School, often abbreviated as TSS, is a public secondary school in Thorold, Ontario, Canada. The school was named after Sir John Thorold, a member of the British Parliament for Lincolnshire, England. It is the only high school in the city.

== History ==
In 1857, a grammar school was established in the village of Thorold, but it was not until 18 years later, in 1875, that the land on which the present high school stands was purchased. The site, bound by Ormond, St. David and Carleton Streets, was purchased for $1856.77 from Dr. Rolls of Thorold, and the building was erected at a cost of $6000. In 1928, a seven-room and gymnasium addition was constructed, and the building was officially opened on the eve of the graduation ceremonies held on November 22, 1929. The 2011-2012 school year was a significant one for TSS, as it took part in a review of all secondary schools in southern St. Catharines and Thorold.

In 2012, District School Board of Niagara trustees voted on whether to close the school and decided to keep it open.

== See also ==
- Education in Ontario
- List of secondary schools in Ontario
