= Greater Fort Erie Secondary School =

Public school in Fort Erie, Ontario, Canada

Location
- 1640 Garrison Street; Fort Erie, Ontario, L2A 5M4; Canada; 42°54′18.9″N 78°58′32.4″W

Information
- Type: Public Secondary School
- Established: 2017
- School board: District School Board of Niagara
- Principal: Fred Louws
- Faculty: 74
- Grades: 9 to 12
- Enrollment: 985 (September 2021)
- Language: English
- Colours: Dark Red and Gold
- Mascot: Gryphons
- Website: greaterforterie.dsbn.org

Greater Fort Erie Secondary School, also known as GFESS, is a public secondary school in Fort Erie, Ontario, Canada. It serves as the only secondary school in the town, after replacing Fort Erie Secondary School and Ridgeway Crystal Beach High School in 2017. GFESS is operated by the District School Board of Niagara (DSBN).

== History ==
The Greater Fort Erie Secondary School opened in 2017. The school was the first high school to be built by the DSBN since 1971 and cost $30 million. Greater Fort Erie was built to replace Ridgeway Crystal Beach High and Fort Erie Secondary School. In 2023, a spirit assembly at the school featured a live performance by Murda Beatz. The school has a Positive Spaces Club where students can discuss their gender and sexuality.

== See also ==
- Education in Ontario
- List of secondary schools in Ontario
