= Westlane Secondary School =

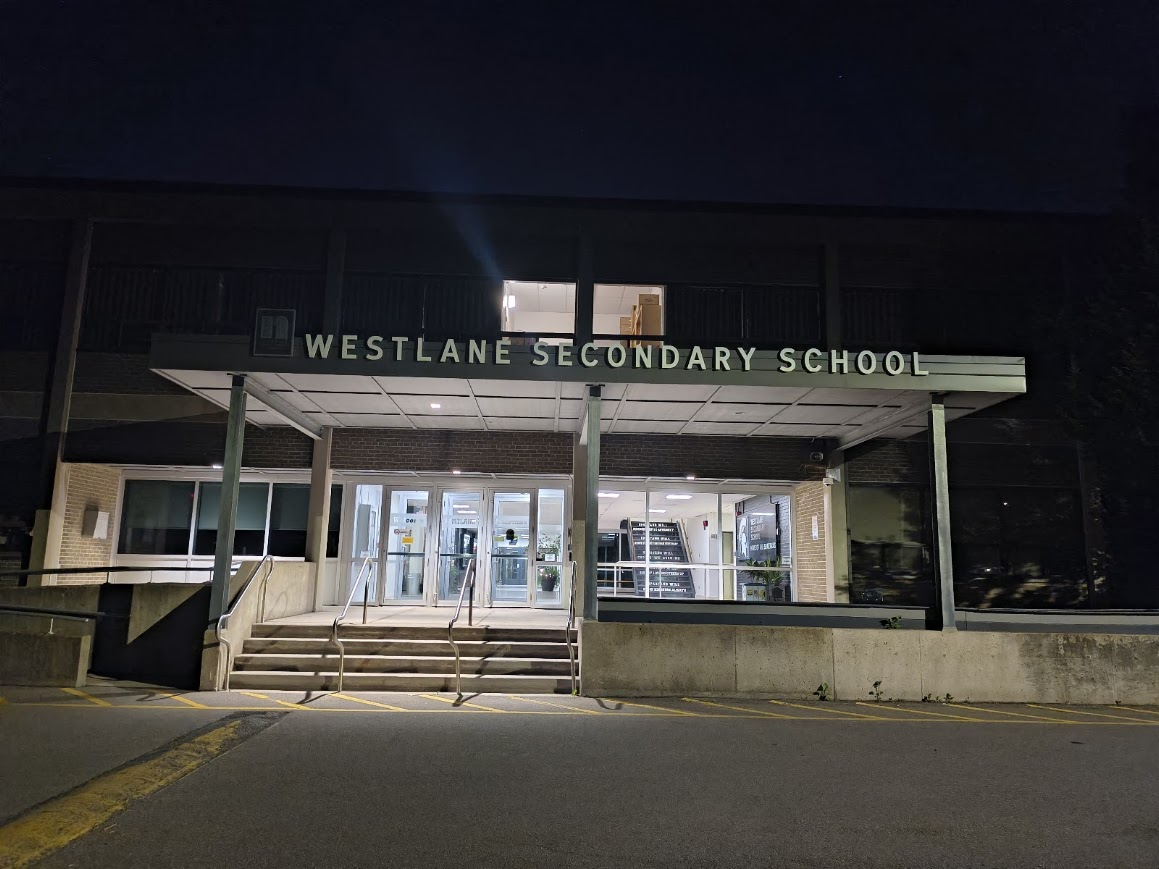

Location
- 5960 Pitton Rd; Niagara Falls, Ontario, L2H 1T5; Canada; 43°05′14″N 79°07′54″W

Information
- School type: Secondary school
- Founded: September 1960
- School board: District School Board of Niagara
- Superintendent: Cam Hathaway
- Area trustee: Kevin Maves; Barb Ness
- School number: 952214
- Principal: Tyler Graham
- Grades: 9–12
- Enrollment: 669 (September 2009)
- Language: English
- Campus: Suburban
- Colours: Green and White
- Mascot: Spartan
- Team name: Spartans
- Website: https://westlane.dsbn.org/

Westlane Secondary School is a Canadian public secondary school located in Niagara Falls, Ontario, Canada. It serves the Lundy's Lane area, and is part of the District School Board of Niagara. As of September 2009, it had 669 students. In the Fraser Institute's Report Card on Ontario's Secondary Schools 2011, the school was ranked 351 out of 727 secondary schools in Ontario with an overall rating of 6.3 out of 10.

Its campus contains a football/rugby and soccer field, along with a baseball diamond. The building includes one full gymnasium as well as a half-gym with multiple changing rooms with showers, a weight room, an elevator, and a 500-seat cafeteria.

Westlane's feeder schools are James Morden Public School, Forestview Public School, Greendale Public School, K.S. Durdan Public School and Orchard Park Public School, and Thundering Heights Public School.

== Technology Department ==
Westlane Technology Education encompasses the total program at all levels from grade nine through grade twelve. Students are exposed to and develop skills in the areas of Communication, Electronics, Electricity, Videography, Integrated Technology, Tech Design, Construction, Manufacturing, and Transportation. Westlane Technology Department

== FIRST Robotics ==
Team # 1503 is a part of Westlane Secondary School's extra curriculum. Students from grades 9-12 are members of the team. Westlane Robotics

== Mock Trial Team ==
The Mock Trial team was established in 2004. Students compete in extra-curricular tournaments supervised by the Ontario Bar Association. Students prepare a case as both Crown and Defence counsel. The Westlane Mock Trial Team won the District School Board Mock Trial Tournament in 2006, 2007, and 2008. They have finished in the semi-finals or better that the South-Central Ontario Regional Tournament since 2006.

== Athletics ==
The Westlane Spartans are known for their excellent athletic programs, most notably their basketball, football, rugby, volleyball, and soccer teams. They have produced several OFSAA and SOSSA champions in rugby, basketball, downhill skiing, soccer and cross-country. Westlane Athletics

The Westlane Spartans are currently members of Niagara Varsity Division 1. This league consists of twelve teams. In 2008, the Spartans record was 6-2. Although the program is currently on the rise, Westlane was a dominant football team in the 1990s. Westlane football were league champions in 1989, 1992, 1993, 1994, 1997, and 2019. Spartan Football Website

The Westlane Spartans Sr. won SOSSA AAA/AAAA in rugby 1998 and Jr. won SOSSA in 1994 and 2004.

== Notable alumni ==
- Ray Barkwill (class of 1998), professional rugby player
- Joel Zimmerman (class of 1999), electronic music producer and DJ known professionally as Deadmau5
- Jim Martyn (class of 1974), Television Host, play by play announcer and Canadian Motorsports Hall Of Fame 2021 inductee; (American Lemans Series, IMSA Radio, Canadian Tire Motorsports Park, Sebring International Raceway, IMSA Radio).

== See also ==
- Education in Ontario
- List of secondary schools in Ontario
