= St. Catharines Collegiate =

Secondary school in St. Catharines, Ontario, Canada

St. Catharines Collegiate Institute and Vocational School
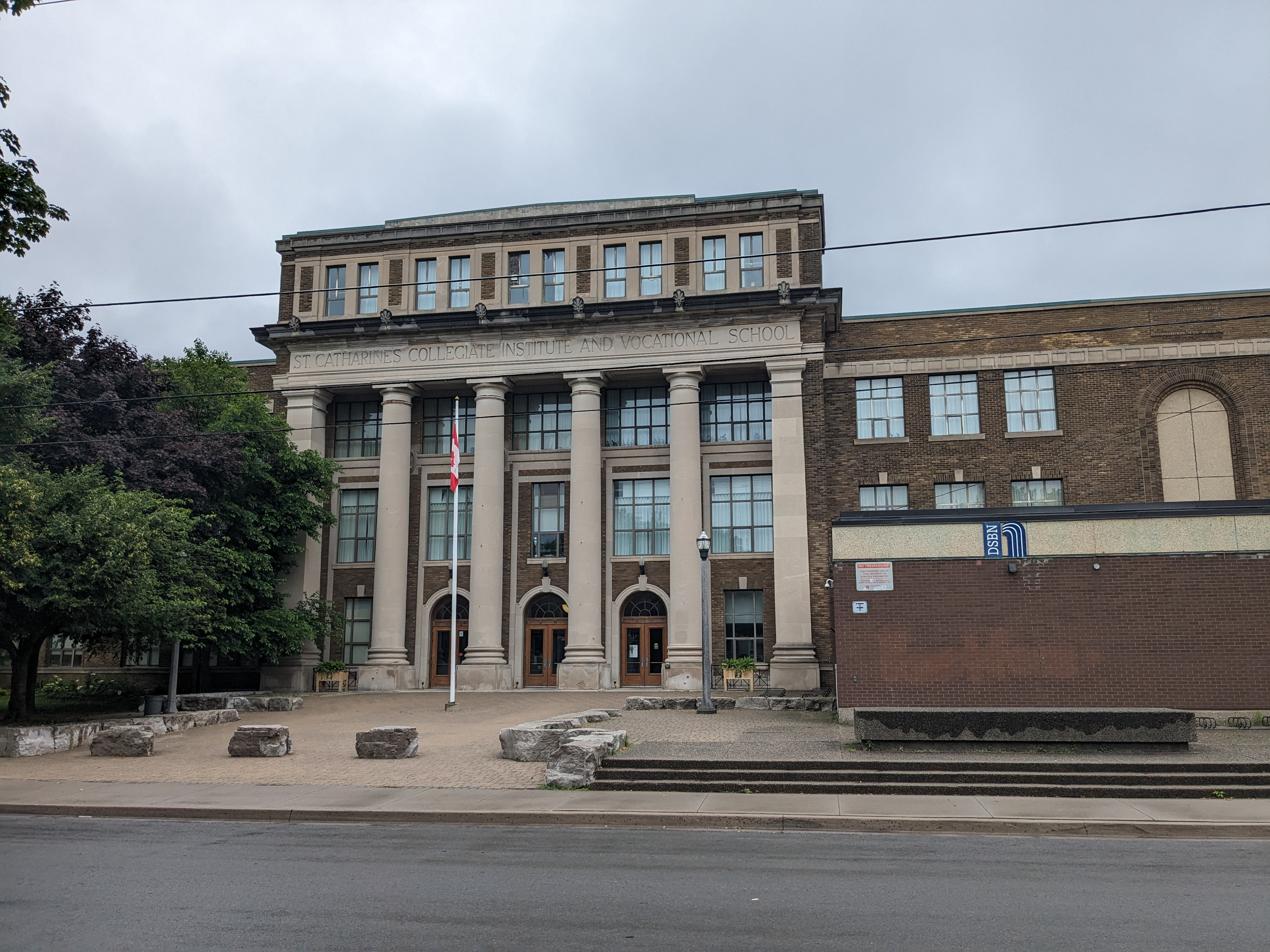
- The school in 2023

Location
- 34 Catharine Street; St.Catharines, Ontario, L2R 5E7; Canada; 43°10′1.1″N 79°14′40.2″W

Information
- Type: Public Secondary School
- Established: 1923
- School board: District School Board of Niagara
- Principal: Carla Piovesana
- Grades: 9 to 12
- Enrollment: 585 (September 2021)
- Website: collegiate.dsbn.org/home

St. Catharines Collegiate is a public secondary school in St. Catharines, Ontario, Canada. It is part of the District School Board of Niagara and is one of the oldest secondary schools in the Niagara region.

== History ==
Grantham Academy, built in 1829, was a direct precursor to St. Catharines Collegiate. The institution was funded by William Hamilton Merritt. It was renamed the St. Catharines District Grammar School in the 1840s and became the St. Catharines Collegiate Institute and Vocational School in 1871, which was when the Ontario School Act was established. The current building in which St. Catharines Collegiate stands was completed in 1923, causing the school to celebrate its hundredth anniversary in 2023. A time capsule was opened at the celebration.

The school has a co-op program where students can learn culinary skills. As of 2012, these students prepared food sold in the cafeteria.

== Incidents ==
In 2023, a 15 year old student was stabbed at the school.

== Notable alumni ==
- Mohammed Ahmed (runner), long-distance runner in the Olympics
- Stan Mikita, former Chicago Blackhawks player
- Marcel Dionne, former NHL player

== See also ==
- Education in Ontario
- List of secondary schools in Ontario
