= E. L. Crossley Secondary School =

E.L. Crossley Secondary School
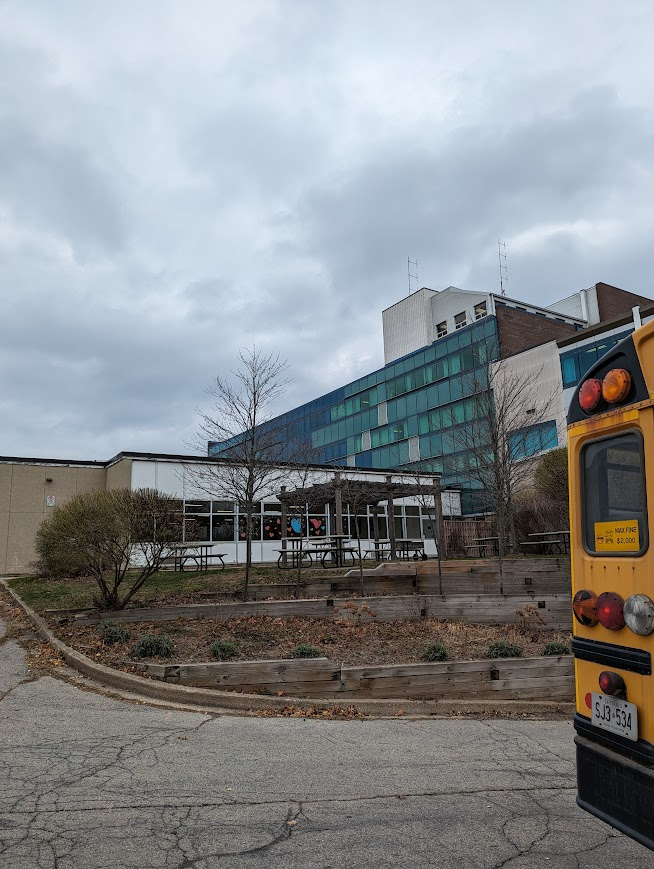

Location
- 350 Highway 20; Fonthill, Ontario, L0S 1E0; Canada; 43°2′29″N 79°19′2.9″W

Information
- Type: Public secondary school
- Established: 1963
- School district: District School Board of Niagara
- Principal: Monika Pries-Klassen
- Grades: 9–12+
- Colours: Blue, Gold, White
- Mascot: Cyclone
- Team name: Cyclones
- Website: elcrossley.dsbn.org

E.L. Crossley Secondary School is a public secondary school in Fonthill, Ontario, Canada. It is part of the District School Board of Niagara.

== Extracurriculars ==
EL Crossley offers a wide range of extra curricular activities this includes volleyball, soccer, rowing, badminton, and many more.

== See also ==
- Education in Ontario
- List of secondary schools in Ontario
