= West Niagara Secondary School =

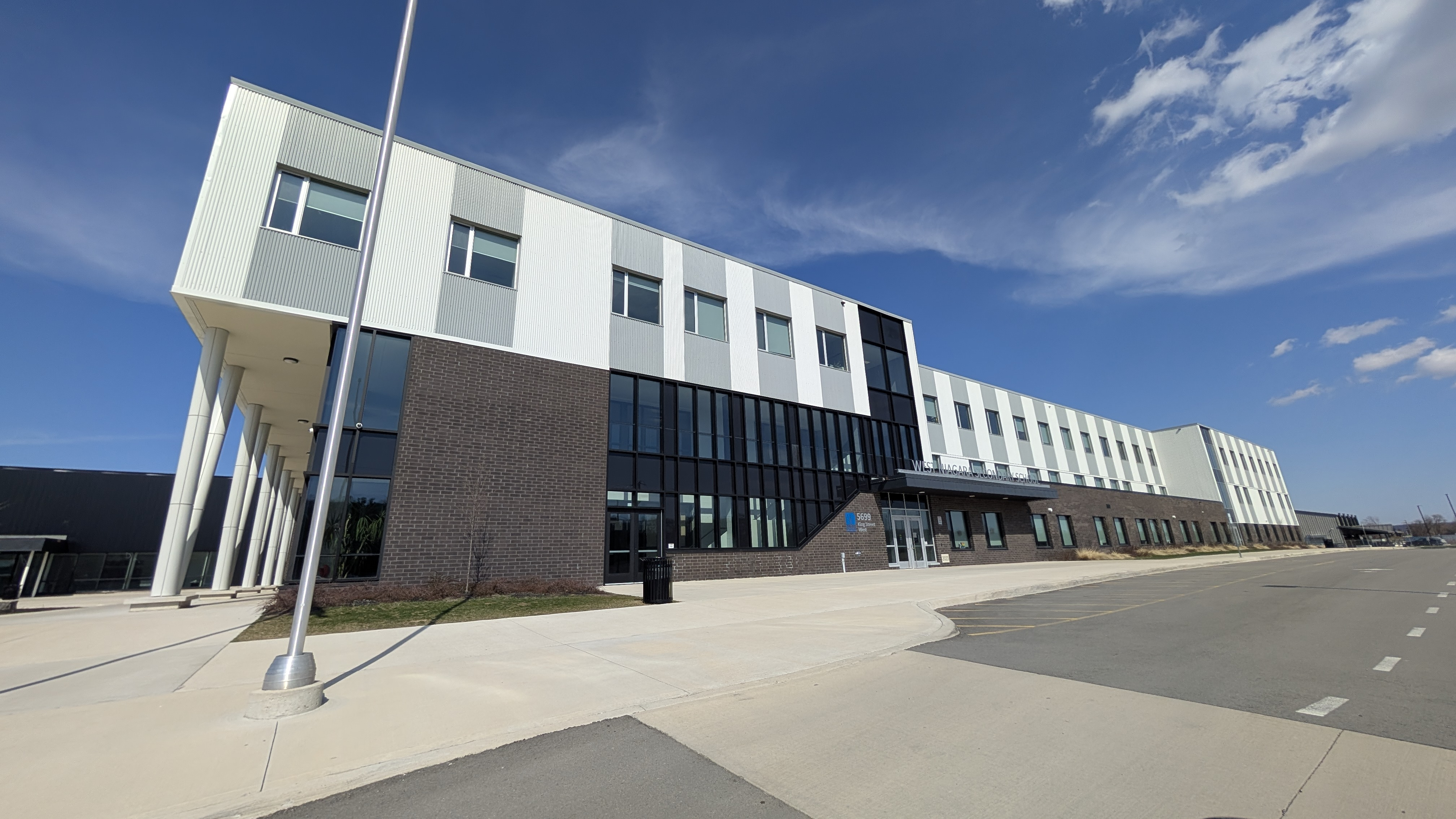

Location
- 5699 King Street; Niagara; Beamsville, Ontario, L0R 1B3; Canada

Information
- Established: 2022
- School board: DSBN
- Principal: Janice Sargeant
- Grades: 9-12
- Enrollment: 1500 (September 2023)
- Colour: Light Blue/White
- Nickname: Wolfpack
- Website: https://westniagara.dsbn.org/

West Niagara Secondary School is a secondary school in Beamsville, Ontario, Canada, and operated by the District School Board of Niagara (DSBN). It replaced the former Grimsby Secondary School and Beamsville District Secondary School in 2022. West Niagara is currently the newest secondary school in the Niagara Region.

== Construction delays ==
The construction of the school faced many delays and was originally planned to open in September 2020. One of the more notable delays was the extensive soil cleanup required due to contaminants found on the site. The COVID-19 pandemic caused sufficient delays to prevent the school from opening for the 2022–2023 school year. Construction finished in time for the 2023-2024 school year, when students set foot in the school for the first time. After moving to the new site, the Grimsby Secondary School and Beamsville District Secondary School buildings were both closed, though they are still owned by the DSBN. The GSS building was repurposed for Central French Immersion Public School, which could no longer fit in its old building. The former BDSS building was purchased by the Town of Lincoln, and the town will take ownership of the property in January 2025.

== Break-In ==
On July 27, 2024, the school was the target of a break and enter. The suspects caused "extensive damage" to the interior of the school. They also stole two vehicles from the auto garage, and were seen driving in the nearby area. The vehicles were recovered.

== See also ==
- Education in Ontario
- List of secondary schools in Ontario
