= Laura Secord Secondary School =

High school in St. Catharines, Ontario, Canada

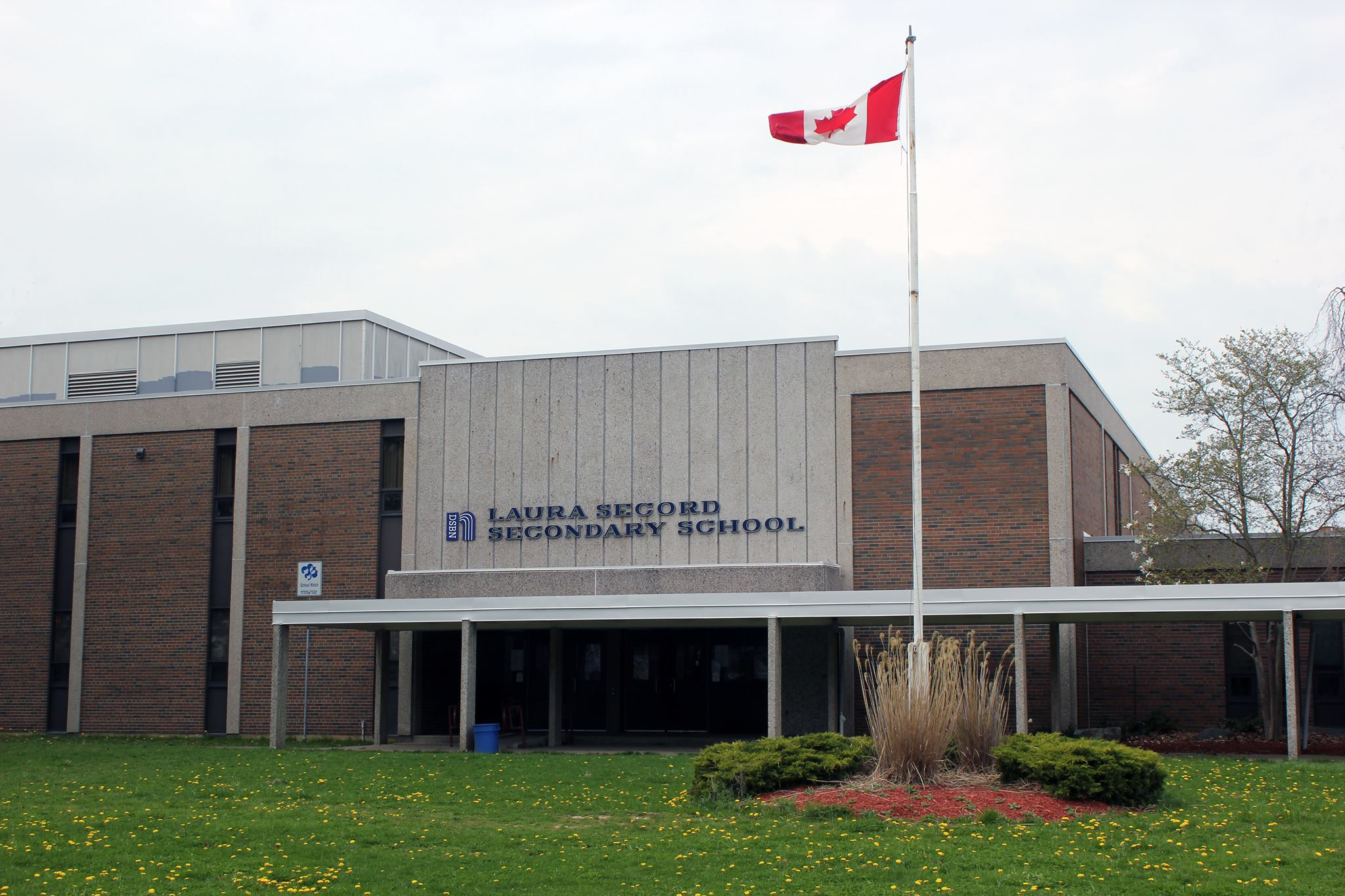

Location
- 349 Niagara Street; St. Catharines, Ontario, L2M 4V9; Canada; 43°11′1.6″N 79°13′34.9″W

Information
- Type: Secondary School
- Motto: Supero cum sapientia (I conquer through wisdom)
- Established: 1966
- School board: District School Board of Niagara
- Superintendent: Ann Gilmore
- Area trustee: Kate Baggott
- Principal: Tracy Sacco
- Faculty: 36
- Grades: 9 to 12
- Enrollment: 630 (2020-2021)
- Language: English
- Campus: St. Catharines
- Colours: Green and Gold
- Mascot: The Patriot
- Yearbook: The Patriot
- Website: https://laurasecord.dsbn.org/

Laura Secord Secondary School, also known simply as Laura Secord, is a public secondary school in St. Catharines, Ontario, Canada. It is located near the corner of Niagara and Carlton Streets. Laura Secord is a part of the District School Board of Niagara (DSBN). The school was founded in 1966.

== History ==
Laura Secord Secondary School is named after Laura Secord, a Canadian heroine of the War of 1812. In 2016, the school celebrated its fiftieth anniversary.

== Performing Arts ==
The earliest known video of a live performance by the rock band Rush was recorded at the school in 1974, as part of their appearance on the television series Canadian Bandstand.

The school has had its own productions of musicals. Students performed Oklahoma! in 2014, Anything Goes in 2016, The Addams Family in 2018, and 9 to 5 in 2024.

== Athletics ==
The Laura Secord Patriots compete in the Niagara Region High School Athletics Association (NRHSAA) region, one of four zones in the Southern Ontario Secondary Schools Association (SOSSA). As of 2023, a synthetic grass field was planned for the school.

== Notable alumni ==
- Ronnie Arneill; professional wrestler
- James Bryan McCollum – musician, songwriter, and music producer. McCollum is a guitarist for The Philosopher Kings and Prozzäk.
- Scott Feschuk – Canadian speechwriter, humorist and former newspaper journalist.

== See also ==
- Education in Ontario
- List of secondary schools in Ontario
