= District School Board of Niagara =

Public school board district in Ontario, Canada

Location
- 191 Carlton St; St. Catharines, ON; L2R 7P4 Canada
- Coordinates: 43.17511°N 79.24713°W

District information
- School board: Kate Baggott; Sue Barnett (Chair); Nancy Beamer; Mike Brousseau; Lora Campbell; Jonathan Fast; Paul McKiernan (Vice Chair); Helga Campbell; Shannon Mitchell; Deanne MacIntosh; Susan Jovanovic; Kyrie McKenzie; Eli Woelfl
- Director of education: Kelly Pisek
- Schools: 79 primary 16 secondary
- District ID: B66150

Students and staff
- Students: 43,519

Other information
- Website: dsbn.org

The District School Board of Niagara (DSBN, known as English-language Public District School Board No. 22 prior to 1999) is a school board in the public school system of Ontario, Canada, in the Regional Municipality of Niagara. Its head office is in St. Catharines. The DSBN operates schools in each of the twelve municipalities in the region. It employs close to 2,500 instructional staff to teach over 43,000 students in 97 elementary schools and 18 secondary schools. As of 2018, it was considered the top employer by number of employees in the Niagara Region. DSBN offers high school level courses online through Desire2Learn (D2L).

The board was created on January 1, 1998, as a result of the amalgamation of the Lincoln County Board of Education serving the boundaries of the former Lincoln County, and the Niagara South Board of Education which served the boundaries of the former Welland County.

== Secondary schools ==
School name	Street address	Community	Postal
A. N. Myer Secondary School	6338 O'Neil Street	Niagara Falls	L2J 1M7
DSBN Academy Secondary	130 Louth Street	St. Catharines	L2S 2T4
Eastdale Secondary School	170 Wellington Street	Welland	L3B 1B3
Eden High School	535 Lake Street	St. Catharines	L2N 4H7
E.L. Crossley Secondary School	350 Highway #20	Fonthill	L0S 1E0
Governor Simcoe Secondary School	15 Glenview Avenue	St. Catharines	L2N 2Z7
Greater Fort Erie Secondary School	1640 Garrison Road	Fort Erie	L2A 5M4
Laura Secord Secondary School	349 Niagara Street	St. Catharines	L2M 4V9
Port Colborne High School	211 Elgin Street	Port Colborne	L3K 3K4
Sir Winston Churchill Secondary School	101 Glen Morris Drive	St. Catharines	L2T 2N1
Stamford Collegiate Secondary School	5775 Drummond Road	Niagara Falls	L2G 4L2
St. Catharines Collegiate Secondary School	34 Catherine Street	St. Catharines	L2R 5E7
Thorold Secondary School	50 Ormond Street North	Thorold	L2V 1Z1
Welland Centennial Secondary School	240 Thorold Road West	Welland	L3C 3W2
West Niagara Secondary School	5699 King Street	Lincoln	L0R 1B3
Westlane Secondary School	5960 Pitton Road	Niagara Falls	L2H 1T5

Stamford Collegiate began as Drummond Grammar School in 1856, Drummondville High School in 1871, Niagara South High School in 1882 and Stamford in 1907.

== Former schools ==
Pelham District Secondary School (1949) began as a Pelham Continuation School in 1922 and closed in 1974.

Lakeport Secondary School closed in 2011.

Thorold Fonthill High School opened in 1958 and became a senior public school in 1970 due to decline enrollment and as Glynn A Green Public School since 2011.

Niagara District Secondary School was closed in 2010 and is now the site of the Royal Elite International Academy.

West Park Secondary School and Kernahan Park Secondary School, two secondary schools in St. Catharines, were both closed in 2013.

Fort Erie Secondary School and Ridgeway-Crystal Beach High School were closed and merged into a new school known as Greater Fort Erie Secondary School, in September 2017.

Grimsby Secondary School and Beamsville District Secondary School were closed in 2022 and merged into a new school known as West Niagara Secondary School. South Lincoln High School had previously closed in 2017 as part of this meger, with its students being split between Grimsby Secondary School and E.L. Crossley Secondary School.

== See also ==
- Niagara Catholic District School Board
  - Conseil scolaire catholique du Nouvel-Ontario (French-language Catholic school board)
- List of school districts in Ontario
- List of high schools in Ontario
- Conseil scolaire Viamonde (public secular French-language school board)
