= West Park Secondary School (St. Catharines) =

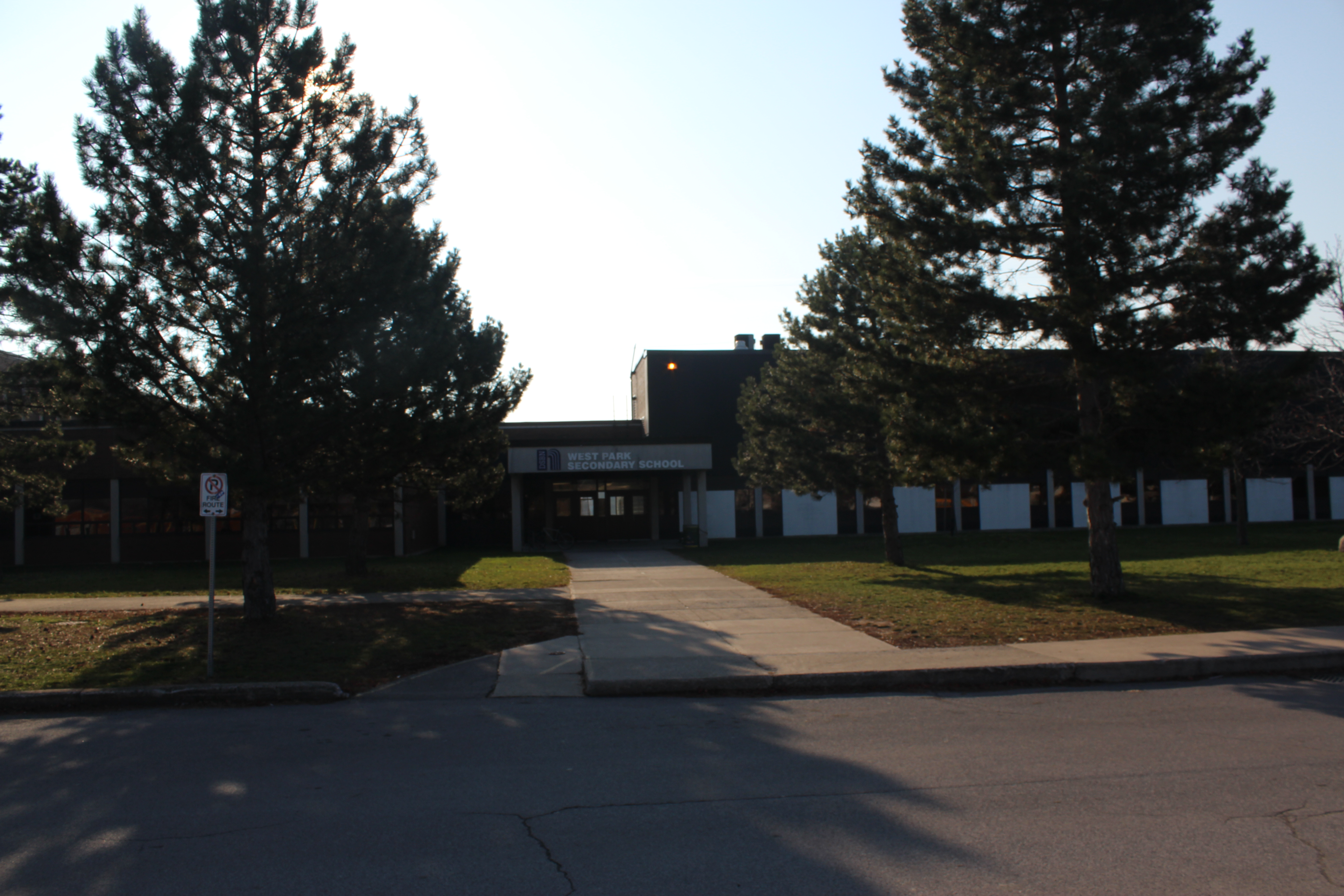
- St. Catharines, Ontario; Canada

Information
- School type: Secondary school
- Motto: Libertas Per Deligentiam (Freedom Through Effort)
- Founded: 1969
- School board: District School Board of Niagara
- Principal: Mrs. Shirley Scott
- Grades: 9-12
- Language: English
- Area: St. Catharines, Ontario
- Colours: Green and gold
- Team name: Warriors
- Website: westpark.dsbn.org

West Park Secondary School was a secondary school in St. Catharines, Ontario, Canada, administered by the District School Board of Niagara from 1969 to 2013.

== History ==
The opening of the school in September 1969 marked the close of several chapters in the history of education in the City of St. Catharines. For many years, the students from this area had to attend various secondary schools in other parts of the city. They now had their own school in which to build local traditions of excellence in educational achievements.

The site on which this school is built was originally part of a 100-acre land grant that was conveyed to John Gould by Letters Patent from the Crown in 1806. He sold off parcels of this land during the succeeding years, and by the time of Confederation, it had been fragmented into the hands of fifty-four different owners. Among the names of early settlers of this area are found, as recorded by the Registrar of Deeds, those of: Merritt, Woodruff, Rykert, Macdonald, Mettleberger, Bullivant, Adams and Brown.

In 1963, the Board of Education for the City of St. Catharines took steps towards the building of West Park by passing the motion. that the Board approve in principle that a secondary school site of approximately fifteen acres would be purchased in an area bound by Louth Street, Rykert Street and Powerview Avenue. By arrangement with the City of St. Catharines, through the Parks and Recreation Commission, it was agreed that this area should be developed as a school-recreation-park complex. The Board of Education purchased approximately seven acres, from a private owner. The city made available to the Board about seven acres of the unopened Homeland Plan subdivision, and jointly the Board and the city acquired another acre from the rear of the lots on Louth Street, For the building project the firm of Macbeth, Williams, Woodruff and Hadaway was chosen as architects and the general contract was awarded to Newman Brothers Company Limited. Construction began on October 14, 1967. The total cost of the school was $3,250,943.00 of which $1,985,943.00 was received as federal-provincial grants. The community swimming pool was constructed by the city and designed so that it would be completely integrated with the school properly. At a later date, the swimming pool was enclosed for year-round use.

West Park S.S. was more than a school; it was an integral part of the community serving the educational and recreational needs of all families west of Twelve Mile Creek. The school site adjoins the Powerview Park, which, like the swimming pool, is under the Parks and Recreation Commission. West Park students made use of the swimming pool, football and soccer fields, tennis courts and baseball diamond. In 1999, the track and its in-field were brought up to national standards. The combined park-and-school complex occupies a site of 14.5 acres. Athletics using these facilities complemented other athletic programs in rowing, basketball, volleyball, golf, badminton and more.

The program of the school led to both university and college post-secondary pursuits. The Communication Technology lab and television arts studio provided students with the opportunity to bring together their artistic creativity and academic strengths.

In June 2012, Trustees voted to close West Park despite arguments that it is one of the newer schools in The District School Board of Niagara. Trustee Dalton Clark voted against the proposal to close the school stating that "he could not support a recommendation to close West Park, because of the facilities the board would lose.

== Rowing ==
West Park had a strong rowing tradition throughout the school's history. In 1970, Principal Ron Baum asked Rudy Weiler to head up coaching the rowing program. The program grew rapidly and in 1971, West Park won the points championship at the 26th Canadian Scholastic Rowing Championships (now Canadian Secondary School Rowing Association or SCCRA Championships) In 1972, West Park won a school-record seven CSSRA titles. In 1976, the rowing program expanded again when girls rowing was introduced. The girls rowing program was successful from the start and "from 1977 to 1981, West Park's girls eight won five straight high school Triple Crown titles, with victories at the Stotesbury Cup and the Canadian and U.S. high school championships." From its beginnings in 1970 well into the 80's, "West Park's rowing program was a powerhouse, winning 12-13 CSSRA combined team titles and producing 43 athletes who represented Canada internationally at the junior and senior level. West Park athletes won four bronze, one silver and two golds at world and Olympic competitions, including Kevin Neufeld, a 1984 Olympic champion in the men's eight."

West Park competed in the Early Bird, Mother's Day, Welland and London Regattas. The season culminated with the Canadian Secondary School Championship (formerly Schoolboy) a 3-day competition at the end of May with more than 2,500 athletes. West Park has won numerous medals, including 77 plaques from The Canadian Secondary School Championship and 15 plaques from The Stotesbury Cup, Philadelphia. Students have also been awarded scholarships to Harvard and Michigan State among others. West Park was one of the best-equipped teams with over $300,000 worth of equipment purchased with funds raised by West Park Rowing Alumni.
