= List of Canadian Football League records (Playoffs) =

This is a list of Canadian Football League playoff records that are effective as of the end of the 2025 CFL season. This list includes both players and teams in the Canadian Football League (CFL) that have played in playoff games. The CFL does not include Grey Cup games in their categorization of playoff games.

== Individual records ==
=== Participation ===
Most games played, playoffs

- 41 – Norm Kwong
- 41 – Ted Tully
- 37 – Rollie Miles
- 36 – Buddy Tinsley
- 36 – Ron Lancaster

=== Points ===
Most points, career playoffs

- 222 – Mark McLoughlin
- 210 – Lui Passaglia
- 204 – Sean Fleming
- 204 – Sean Whyte
- 196 – Larry Robinson

Most points, single game

- 30 – Lorne Benson (October 28, 1953)
- 24 – Ron Morris (November 11, 1961)
- 23 – Troy Westwood (November 22, 1992)
- 21 – Carlos Huerta (November 12, 1995)
- 21 – Sean Fleming (November 13, 2005)

=== Touchdowns ===
Most touchdowns, career playoffs

- 20 – Johnny Bright
- 19 – George Reed
- 16 – Rollie Miles
- 12 – Jackie Parker
- 12 – Terry Evanshen
- 12 – Russ Jackson

Most touchdowns, single game

- 6 – Lorne Benson (October 28, 1953)
- 4 – Ron Morris (November 11, 1961)
- 3 – Many

Most rushing touchdowns, career playoffs

- 18 – George Reed
- 15 – Johnny Bright
- 12 – Russ Jackson

Most rushing touchdowns, single game

- 6 – Lorne Benson (October 28, 1953)

Most receiving touchdowns, career playoffs

- 12 – Terry Evanshen
- 11 – Rollie Miles
- 10 – James Murphy

Most receiving touchdowns, single game

- 4 – Ron Morris (November 11, 1961)
- 3 – Hal Waggoner (November 17, 1956)
- 3 – Jackie Parker (November 17, 1956)
- 3 – Jim Dillard (November 19, 1966)
- 3 – John Holland (November 11, 1979)
- 3 – Mervyn Fernandez (November 20, 1983)
- 3 – Darren Flutie (November 20, 1994)
- 3 – Jim Sandusky (November 10, 1996)
- 3 – S. J. Green (November 23, 2014)
- 3 – Eric Rogers (November 18, 2018)
- 3 – Kenny Lawler (November 9, 2024)

Most interception return touchdowns, career playoffs

- 2 – Tony Golab
- 2 – Marvin Coleman
- 2 – Glenn Rogers Jr.

Most interception return touchdowns, single game

- 2 – Tony Golab (November 11, 1948)
- 2 – Marvin Coleman (November 4, 1995)

Most fumble return touchdowns, career playoffs

- 2 – Fritz Falgren
- 2 – Tom Casey
- 2 – Joe Harris

Most fumble return touchdowns, single game

- 2 – Fritz Falgren (October 31, 1936)
- 2 – Joe Harris (November 13, 1976)

Most kickoff return touchdowns, career playoffs

- 3 – Gerry James

Most kickoff return touchdowns, single game

- 1 – Rollie Miles (November 3, 1951)
- 1 – Jim Chambers (November 12, 1951)
- 1 – Doug Smylie (November 26, 1952)
- 1 – Gerry James (October 31, 1951)
- 1 – Gerry James (November 1, 1954)
- 1 – Ron Howell (November 12, 1955)
- 1 – Gerry James (November 6, 1957)
- 1 – Cowboy Woodruff (November 2, 1960)
- 1 – Gene Gaines (November 14, 1964)
- 1 – Michael Clemons (November 17, 1996)
- 1 – Arland Bruce III (November 14, 2004)
- 1 – Skyler Green (November 15, 2009)
- 1 – Mario Alford (November 10, 2019)
- 1 – James Letcher Jr. (November 11, 2023)
- 1 – Robert Carter Jr. (November 1, 2025)

Most punt return touchdowns, career playoffs

- 2 – Larry Taylor
- 2 – Tristan Jackson
- 2 – Brandon Banks
- 2 – Janarion Grant

Most punt return touchdowns, single game

- 2 – Larry Taylor (November 15, 2008)
- 2 – Brandon Banks (November 23, 2014)

=== Passing ===
Most quarterback starts, career playoffs

- 35 (19–16) – Ron Lancaster
- 25 (15–10) – Russ Jackson
- 22 (9–13) – Damon Allen
- 21 (9–12) – Eagle Day
- 21 (15–5–1) – Ken Ploen

Most passing yards, career playoffs

- 6,676 – Ron Lancaster
- 4,891 – Damon Allen
- 3,830 – Tracy Ham
- 3,732 – Ricky Ray
- 3,719 – Trevor Harris

Most passing yards, single game

- 518 – Tony Curcillo (November 17, 1956)
- 513 – Anthony Calvillo (November 13, 2011)
- 492 – Ron Lancaster (November 11, 1963)
- 487 – Dru Brown (November 2, 2024)
- 468 – Kent Austin (November 15, 1992)

Most pass attempts, career playoffs

- 886 – Ron Lancaster
- 633 – Damon Allen
- 498 – Tracy Ham
- 470 – Ricky Ray
- 449 – Eagle Day

Most pass attempts, single game

- 61 – Dru Brown (November 2, 2024)
- 60 – Trevor Harris (November 12, 2017)
- 51 – Reggie Slack (November 4, 1995)
- 51 – Kevin Glenn (November 15, 2009)
- 50 – Tobin Rote (November 20, 1960)

Most pass completions, career playoffs

- 453 – Ron Lancaster
- 342 – Damon Allen
- 317 – Trevor Harris
- 303 – Ricky Ray
- 280 – Tracy Ham

Most pass completions, single game

- 46 – Dru Brown (November 2, 2024)
- 38 – Kerwin Bell (November 8, 1998)
- 37 – Trevor Harris (November 12, 2017)
- 36 – Trevor Harris (November 10, 2019)
- 35 – Mike Kerrigan (November 23, 1986)
- 35 – Matt Nichols (November 12, 2017)

Highest pass completion percentage, career playoffs (minimum 150 attempts)

- 72.8 – Trevor Harris
- 69.2 – Cody Fajardo
- 69.0 – Jeremiah Masoli
- 68.7 – Zach Collaros
- 68.0 – Dave Dickenson

Highest pass completion percentage, single game (minimum 20 attempts)

- 92.3 (36/39) – Trevor Harris (November 10, 2019)
- 90.6 (29/32) – Trevor Harris (November 18, 2018)
- 90.0 (18/20) – Chad Kelly (November 2, 2024)
- 85.7 (18/21) – Russ Jackson (November 15, 1958)
- 83.3 (25/30) – Cody Fajardo (November 7, 2026)

Most touchdown passes, career playoffs

- 42 – Ron Lancaster
- 33 – Damon Allen
- 26 – Russ Jackson
- 24 – Tom Clements
- 24 – Tracy Ham

Most touchdown passes, single game

- 6 – Trevor Harris (November 18, 2018)
- 5 – Tom O'Malley (November 21, 1951)
- 5 – Tony Curcillo (November 17, 1956)
- 5 – Bernie Faloney (November 26, 1961)
- 5 – Ron Lancaster (November 11, 1963)
- 5 – Ken Hobart (November 17, 1985)
- 5 – Danny Barrett (November 10, 1991)
- 5 – Anthony Calvillo (November 22, 2009)

Most interceptions thrown, career playoffs

- 65 – Ron Lancaster
- 27 – Damon Allen
- 26 – Jack Jacobs
- 25 – Russ Jackson
- 25 – Tom Clements

Most interceptions thrown, single game

- 5 – Glenn Dobbs (October 28, 1953)
- 5 – Jack Jacobs (October 30, 1954)
- 5 – Tony Curcillo (November 17, 1956)
- 5 – Ron Lancaster (November 20, 1963)
- 5 – Ron Lancaster (November 9, 1964)

Highest passer rating, career playoffs (minimum 150 attempts)

- 116.6 – Darian Durant
- 107.8 – Dave Dickenson
- 107.4 – Michael Reilly
- 103.5 – Trevor Harris
- 102.3 – Bo Levi Mitchell 190/285 2594 17 9
- 101.3 – Zach Collaros 171/245 2295 9 6 (Showing top five only) -->

=== Receiving ===
Most receiving yards, career playoffs

- 1,290 – Allen Pitts
- 1,241 – Rollie Miles
- 1,232 – Darren Flutie
- 1,101 – Herm Harrison
- 1,090 – James Murphy

Most receiving yards, single game

- 270 – Rollin Prather (October 25, 1952)
- 260 – Mervyn Fernandez (November 20, 1983)
- 251 – Hal Waggoner (November 17, 1956)
- 207 – Chad Owens (November 18, 2012)
- 197 – Willie Armstead (November 10, 1979)

Most receptions, career playoffs

- 85 – Darren Flutie
- 78 – Allen Pitts
- 72 – Terry Vaughn
- 71 – James Murphy
- 71 – Geroy Simon

Most receptions, single game

- 16 – Derrell Mitchell (November 8, 1998)
- 15 – Rollin Prather (October 25, 1952)
- 15 – Tony Gabriel (November 10, 1974)
- 14 – Ed Hervey (November 2, 1997)
- 13 – Kalil Pimpleton (November 2, 2024)

Longest reception, single game

- 109 – Ken Nielsen (November 20, 1965)
- 102 – Alex Webster (November 20, 1954)
- 102 – Pat Stoqua (November 15, 1981)
- 100 – Ray Truant (November 18, 1953)
- 99 – Hal Waggoner (November 19, 1952)
- 99 – Darrell K. Smith (November 11, 1990)

=== Rushing ===
Most rushing yards, career playoffs

- 2,584 – George Reed
- 2,051 – Johnny Bright
- 2,009 – Normie Kwong
- 1,527 – Dave Thelen
- 1,436 – Mike Pringle

Most rushing yards, single game

- 264 – Mike Pringle (November 2, 1997)
- 253 – Alvin Walker (November 14, 1982)
- 227 – Mike Richardson (November 22, 1992)
- 211 – Mike Pringle (November 4, 1995)
- 204 – George Reed (November 26, 1967)

Most carries, career playoffs

- 577 – George Reed
- 418 – Normie Kwong
- 387 – Johnny Bright
- 276 – Dave Thelen
- 260 – Mike Pringle

Most carries, single game

- 37 – George Reed (November 26, 1967)
- 33 – Mike Richardson (November 22, 1992)
- 32 – Mike Pringle (November 2, 1997)
- 30 – Alvin Walker (November 14, 1982)
- 30 – Charles Roberts (November 5, 2005)

Longest rush, single game

- 100 – Bill Symons (November 9, 1968)
- 95 – Jim Chambers (November 3, 1951)
- 83 – Ted Woods (November 7, 1964)
- 80 – Leo Lewis (November 11, 1955)
- 77 – Jim Washington (November 14, 1976)

=== Interceptions ===
Most interceptions, career playoffs

- 12 – Don Sutherin
- 9 – Oscar Kruger
- 9 – Garney Henley
- 9 – Bob Kosid
- 8 – Bud Grant
- 8 – Rollie Miles

Most interceptions, single game

- 5 – Bud Grant (October 28, 1953)
- 4 – Felix Wright (November 11, 1984)
- 3 – Keith Pearce (November 11, 1954)
- 3 – Oscar Kruger (November 4, 1959)
- 3 – Art Johnson (November 9, 1963)
- 3 – Darrell Moir (November 16, 1986)
- 3 – Josh Johnson (November 10, 2019)
- 3 – Jonathan Moxey (November 28, 2021)

Most interception return yards, career playoffs

- 219 – Marvin Coleman
- 167 – Glenn Rogers Jr.
- 157 – Harvey Wylie
- 151 – Gene Gaines
- 147 – Don Sutherin

Most interception return yards, single game

- 151 – Marvin Coleman (November 4, 1995)
- 116 – Kenny Wheaton (November 5, 2004)
- 115 – Alfred Jordan (November 2, 1997)
- 106 – Greg Peterson (November 15, 1987)
- 103 – Glenn Rogers Jr. (November 10, 1996)

Longest interception return, single game

- 116 – Kenny Wheaton (November 5, 2004)
- 115 – Alfred Jordan (November 2, 1997)
- 106 – Greg Peterson (November 15, 1987)
- 105 – Dave Skrien 40 yards and lateral to Tom Casey 65 yards (November 14, 1953)
- 102 – Harry Skipper (November 12, 1989)

=== Tackles ===
Most defensive tackles, single game

- 14 – Brendon Ayanbadejo (November 10, 2002)
- 14 – Deron Mayo (November 17, 2013)
- 13 – Marvin Pope (November 22, 1992)
- 13 – Bear Woods (November 23, 2014)
- 12 – Doug Landry (November 12, 1989)
- 12 – Deon Lacey (November 28, 2021)
- 12 – Josh Woods (November 11, 2023)
- 12 – Braxton Hill (November 8, 2025)
- 12 – T. J. Lee III (October 31, 2026)

Most special teams tackles, single game

- 5 – Paul Nastasiuk (November 17, 1991)
- 5 – Paul Bushey (November 21, 1993)
- 5 – Dave Donaldson (November 8, 1998)

=== Sacks ===
Most sacks, career playoffs

- 11.0 – Tony Norman
- 9.5 – Grover Covington
- 9.0 – Ted Laurent
- 8.5 – James Parker
- 8.0 – Mike Gray
- 8.0 – Elfrid Payton

Most sacks, single game

- 5.0 – Cameron Wake (November 18, 2007)
- 4.0 – Tony Norman (November 11, 1984)
- 4.0 – Grover Covington (November 17, 1985)
- 4.0 – Stu Laird (November 15, 1987)
- 3.5 – James Curry (November 11, 1984)

=== Punting ===
Highest punting average, career playoffs (minimum 20 punts)

- 48.1 – Richie Leone
- 46.2 – Ferd Burket
- 87 – Alan Ford (1967)
- 85 – Garry Lefebvre (1973)
- 80 – Josh Miller (1995)
- 78 – Joe Zuger (1964)
- 78 – Ed Ulmer (1965)
- 78 – Terry Baker (2002)

Highest punting average, single game (minimum three punts)

- 55.2 – Rob Maver (November 15, 2015)
- 54.0 – Lui Passaglia (November 11, 1984)
- 53.1 – Rod Pantages (November 7, 1953)

Longest punt, single game

- 89 – Lui Passaglia (November 10, 1979)
- 88 – Swayze Waters (November 15, 2015)
- 85 – Cam Fraser (November 10, 1951)
- 83 – Larry Isbell (November 10, 1956)
- 83 – Paul Hickie (November 13, 1983)

=== Field goals ===
Most field goals, career playoffs

- 54 – Mark McLoughlin
- 48 – Lui Passaglia
- 47 – Sean Whyte
- 46 – Troy Westwood
- 45 – Paul McCallum

Most field goals, single game

- 7 – Carlos Huerta (November 12, 1995)
- 6 – Dave Cutler (November 18, 1973)
- 6 – Lance Chomyc (November 15, 1987)
- 6 – Troy Westwood (November 13, 1994)
- 6 – Sean Fleming (November 5, 1995)
- 6 – Sean Fleming (November 13, 2005)
- 6 – Luca Congi (November 11, 2007)
- 6 – Paul McCallum (November 15, 2008)
- 6 – Boris Bede (November 5, 2021)
- 6 – Brett Lauther (October 31, 2026)

Most field goals 50+ yards, career playoffs

- 3 – Dave Cutler
- 3 – Bernie Ruoff
- 3 – Justin Medlock
- 2 – Rene Paredes
- 2 – Brett Lauther

Highest field goal accuracy, career playoffs (minimum 15 attempts)

- 93.10% – Brett Lauther
- 91.30% – Lirim Hajrullahu
- 90.48% – Damon Duval
- 90.00% – Paul McCallum
- 90.00% – Lance Chomyc

Longest field goal made

- 57 – Justin Medlock (November 18, 2018)
- 56 – Bernie Ruoff (November 11, 1984)
- 55 – Justin Medlock (November 15, 2015)
- 55 – Brett Lauther (October 31, 2026)
- 55 – Brett Lauther (October 31, 2026)

Most consecutive field goals, playoffs

- 36 – Paul McCallum (2006–2016)
- 20 – Lirim Hajrullahu (2018–2026)
- 17 – Sean Whyte (2017–2024)
- 14 – Troy Westwood (2001–2007)
- 14 – Brett Lauther (2024–2026)

=== Punt returns ===
Most punt return yards, career playoffs

- 777 – Henry Williams
- 655 – Paul Bennett
- 608 – Rollie Miles
- 516 – Brandon Banks
- 487 – Gord Rowland

Most punt return yards, single game

- 226 – Brandon Banks (November 23, 2014)
- 203 – Larry Taylor (November 15, 2008)
- 159 – Christion Jones (November 19, 2017)
- 157 – Johnny Rodgers (November 15, 1975)

Longest punt return, single game

- 106 – Ryan Grice-Mullen (November 22, 2009)
- 103 – Henry Williams (November 15, 1992)
- 97 – Larry Taylor (November 15, 2008)
- 95 – Johnny Rodgers (November 15, 1975)
- 95 – Curtis Mayfield (November 9, 1997)

=== Kickoff returns ===
Most kickoff return yards, career playoffs

- 805 – Gerry James
- 782 – Rollie Miles
- 675 – Bashir Levingston
- 653 – Henry Williams
- 528 – Marvin Coleman

Most kickoff return yards, single game

- 185 – Angelo Santucci (November 9, 1975)
- 183 – Demetris Summers (November 15, 2008)
- 181 – Loucheiz Purifoy (November 18, 2018)
- 176 – Gene Gaines (November 14, 1964)
- 176 – Skyler Green (November 15, 2009)

Longest kickoff return, single game

- 128 – Gene Gaines (November 14, 1964)
- 105 – James Letcher Jr. (November 11, 2023)
- 101 – Gerry James (November 6, 1957)
- 99 – Mario Alford (November 10, 2019)
- 98 – Ron Howell (November 12, 1955)

== Team records ==
The CFL's team playoff records are only counted since 1936 due to the IRFU playing against collegiate and ORFU teams in years prior.

Most years, playoffs

- 65 – Winnipeg Blue Bombers/'Pegs
- 60 – Edmonton Elks/Eskimos
- 59 – Hamilton Tiger-Cats
- 56 – Calgary Stampeders
- 55 – Regina/Saskatchewan Roughriders
- 55 – Montreal Alouettes

Most consecutive years, playoff participation

- 34 – Edmonton Eskimos (1972–2005)
- 20 – BC Lions (1997–2016)
- 19 – Montreal Alouettes (1996–2014)
- 18 – Calgary Stampeders (2005–2023)
- 17 – Winnipeg Blue Bombers (1980–1996)

Most consecutive years, no playoffs

- 11 – Saskatchewan Roughriders (1977–1987)
- 7 – Hamilton Tigers (1937–1940, 1945–1947)
- 7 – Ottawa Rough Riders/Renegades/Redblacks (1995–1996, 2002–2005, 2014)
- 6 – Calgary Stampeders (1972–1977)

Most wins, playoffs

- 69 – Winnipeg Blue Bombers/'Pegs
- 61 – Edmonton Elks/Eskimos
- 48 – Calgary Stampeders
- 47 – Toronto Argonauts
- 46 – Hamilton Tiger-Cats
- 46 – Regina/Saskatchewan Roughriders

Most consecutive wins, playoffs

- 6 – Toronto Argonauts (November 24, 1945, to November 22, 1947)
- 6 – Montreal Alouettes (November 17, 1954 to November 13, 1957)
- 6 – Edmonton Eskimos (November 20, 1977 to November 21, 1982)
- 6 – Edmonton Eskimos (November 15, 1992 to November 5, 1995)
- 6 – Winnipeg Blue Bombers (November 10, 2019 to November 9, 2024)

Most losses, playoffs

- 55 – Regina/Saskatchewan Roughriders
- 54 – Winnipeg Blue Bombers/'Pegs
- 51 – Calgary Stampeders
- 50 – Hamilton Tiger-Cats
- 47 – Edmonton Elks/Eskimos
