= Bobby Jack Oliver =

American football player (1936–2012)

Profile
- Position: Defensive tackle

Personal information
- Born: January 9, 1936; Abilene, Texas, U.S.
- Died: December 15, 2012 (aged 76); Dallas, Texas, U.S.
- Listed height: 6 ft 2 in (1.88 m)
- Listed weight: 265 lb (120 kg)

Career information
- College: Baylor
- NFL draft: 1958: 2nd round, 21st overall pick

Career history
- 1958–1960: Toronto Argonauts
- 1961–1963: Montreal Alouettes
- 1964: Edmonton Eskimos
- 1964: Hamilton Tiger-Cats

Awards and highlights
- 2× CFL East All-Star (1961, 1962); Jeff Russel Memorial Trophy (1961); Second-team All-SWC (1957)

Bobby Jack Oliver (January 9, 1936 – December 15, 2012) was an American gridiron football defensive tackle.

Graduating from Baylor University, Oliver was a second round pick of the Chicago Cardinals in the 1958 NFL draft. He chose to play in the CFL, starting a 3-year stint with the Toronto Argonauts in 1958. He intercepted 2 passes for the Double Blue and in 1961 was traded to the Montreal Alouettes, along with Paul Fedor and linebacker Ron Brewer, for defensive end Doug McNichol and tackle Billy Shipp.

Oliver enjoyed his greatest success as a Lark, being named an all-star in 1961 and 1962, and winning the Jeff Russel Memorial Trophy as the CFL East MVP. He added kicking to his repertoire, scoring 103 points and punting 22 times.

In 1964, he was traded to the Hamilton Tiger-Cats, where he played 2 games; his contract was promptly sold to the Edmonton Eskimos, where he finished the season and his career.

Oliver married Elizabeth Ann "Betty" Trentham on June 4, 1954; settled in Texas, they have two grown children and one deceased.
