= 1965 BC Lions season =

Canadian football team season

- General manager: Herb Capozzi
- Head coach: Dave Skrien
- Home stadium: Empire Stadium

Results
- Record: 6–9–1
- Division place: 4th, West
- Playoffs: did not qualify

Uniform
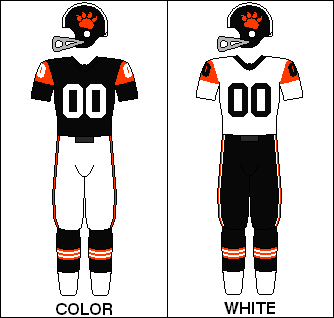

The 1965 BC Lions finished in fourth place in the Western Conference with a 6–9–1 record and failed to defend their Grey Cup title as the team ended the season on a five-game losing streak and missed the playoffs.

On October 24, the Lions set the record for the highest single game regular season attendance at Empire Stadium of 37,788 (this was the CFL record that stood for over a decade until 1976).

While Joe Kapp led the league in passing for the second consecutive season with 2961 yards passing and 219 completions, the other stars on the team were getting older, including star tailback Willie Fleming who had only had 595 yards rushing. Defensive end Dick Fouts was the lone Lion to make the CFL All-star team.

== Regular season ==
=== Season standings ===
The team finished 4th in the Western Conference:

Western Football Conference
| Team | GP | W | L | T | PF | PA | Pts |
|---|---|---|---|---|---|---|---|
| Calgary Stampeders | 16 | 12 | 4 | 0 | 340 | 243 | 24 |
| Winnipeg Blue Bombers | 16 | 11 | 5 | 0 | 301 | 262 | 22 |
| Saskatchewan Roughriders | 16 | 8 | 7 | 1 | 276 | 277 | 17 |
| BC Lions | 16 | 6 | 9 | 1 | 286 | 273 | 13 |
| Edmonton Eskimos | 16 | 5 | 11 | 0 | 257 | 400 | 10 |

=== Season schedule ===
The team had 6 wins and 1 tie in 16 games played:

| Game | Date | Opponent | Results | |
| Game | Date | Opponent | Score | Record |
|---|---|---|---|---|
| 1 | Aug 4 | at Winnipeg Blue Bombers | L 21–23 | 0–1 |
| 2 | Aug 7 | vs. Edmonton Eskimos | W 38–13 | 1–1 |
| 3 | Aug 16 | vs. Winnipeg Blue Bombers | L 6–12 | 1–2 |
| 4 | Aug 20 | at Saskatchewan Roughriders | T 10–10 | 1–2–1 |
| 5 | Aug 29 | vs. Toronto Argonauts | W 36–1 | 2–2–1 |
| 6 | Sept 2 | at Winnipeg Blue Bombers | W 14–7 | 3–2–1 |
| 7 | Sept 11 | vs. Calgary Stampeders | W 24–10 | 4–2–1 |
| 8 | Sept 18 | vs. Montreal Alouettes | L 6–11 | 4–3–1 |
| 9 | Sept 25 | at Calgary Stampeders | L 7–21 | 4–4–1 |
| 10 | Sept 27 | at Saskatchewan Roughriders | W 26–14 | 5–4–1 |
| 11 | Oct 2 | vs. Edmonton Eskimos | W 41–27 | 6–4–1 |
| 12 | Oct 9 | at Edmonton Eskimos | L 12–14 | 6–5–1 |
| 13 | Oct 17 | at Hamilton Tiger-Cats | L 7–25 | 6–6–1 |
| 14 | Oct 19 | at Ottawa Rough Riders | L 14–35 | 6–7–1 |
| 15 | Oct 24 | vs. Saskatchewan Roughriders | L 14–30 | 6–8–1 |
| 16 | Oct 31 | vs. Calgary Stampeders | L 10–20 | 6–9–1 |

=== Offensive leaders ===
| Player | Passing yds | Rushing yds | Receiving yds | TD |
| Joe Kapp | 2961 | 345 | 0 | 4 |
| Willie Fleming | | 595 | 594 | 8 |
| Bill Munsey | | 475 | 84 | 5 |
| Bob Swift | | 501 | 37 | 8 |
| Pat Claridge | | 4 | 554 | 0 |
| Mack Burton | | 0 | 501 | 3 |
| Peter Kempf | | 0 | 497 | 3 |

== Awards and records ==
=== 1965 CFL All-Stars ===
- DE – Dick Fouts, CFL All-Star
