= Bruce Claridge =

Canadian football player (1994-1999)

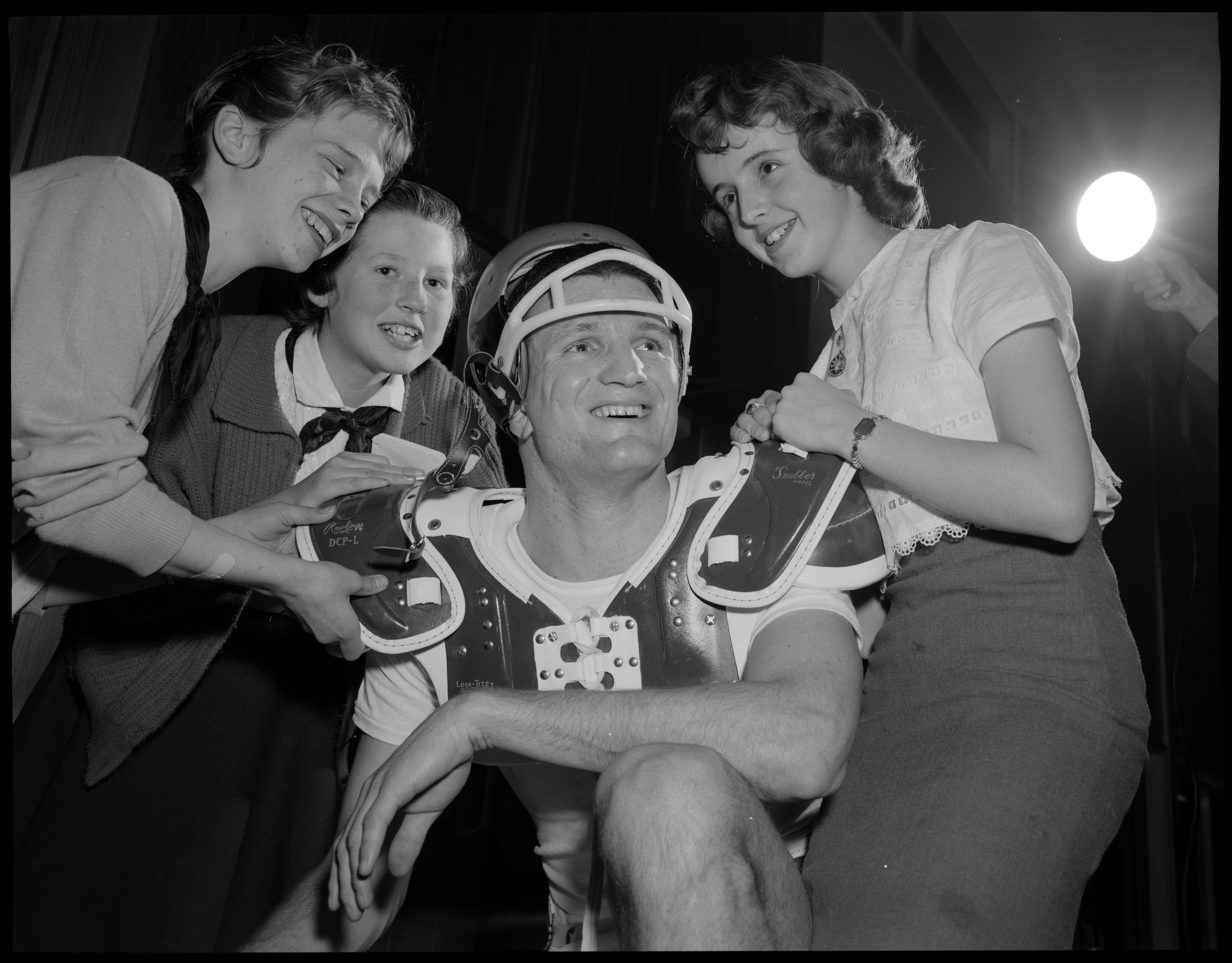
- Claridge in 1959

No. 76, 70, 71, 72
- Position: End

Personal information
- Born: 1934
- Died: April 17, 1999 (aged 64 or 65)
- Listed height: 6 ft 4 in (1.93 m)
- Listed weight: 215 lb (98 kg)

Career information
- Junior: Vancouver Blue Bombers
- College: Washington (1956–1958)

Career history
- 1959–1960: BC Lions
- 1961: Calgary Stampeders
- 1962: Toronto Argonauts
- 1963: Edmonton Eskimos
- 1963–1964: Calgary Stampeders

Bruce Claridge (1934 – April 17, 1999) was a Canadian professional football end who played six seasons in the Canadian Football League (CFL) with the BC Lions, Calgary Stampeders, Toronto Argonauts and Edmonton Eskimos. He played college football at the University of Washington.

== Early life and college ==
Bruce Claridge was born in 1934. He played junior football for the Vancouver Blue Bombers. He was then a three-year letterman for the Washington Huskies of the University of Washington from 1956 to 1958. He caught one pass for 10 yards in 1956, seven passes for 92 yards and one touchdown in 1957, and ten passes for 104 yards in 1958. Claridge played with his brother Pat during his final year at Washington. Pat also later played in the CFL as well.

== Professional career ==
Claridge played in 14 games for the BC Lions of the Canadian Football League (CFL) in 1959, catching 32 passes for 519 yards and four touchdowns while also returning one kick for 13 yards. The Lions finished the season with a 9–7 record. He appeared in 14 games again in 1960, recording six receptions for 75 yards and one touchdown while also recovering two fumbles. The Lions finished the year with a 5–9–2 record. He wore jersey number 76 with the Lions.

Claridge played in 11 games for the CFL's Calgary Stampeders in 1961, catching 16 passes for 223 yards. He wore jersey number 70 with the Stampeders.

Claridge appeared in nine games for the Toronto Argonauts of the CFL during the 1962 season, totaling eight receptions for 83 yards. He wore jersey number 70 with the Argonauts.

He played in 11 games for the CFL's Edmonton Eskimos in 1963, catching 19 passes for 230 yards and one touchdown. He wore jersey number 71 with the Eskimos.

Claridge then finished the 1963 CFL season by playing in four games for the Stampeders, recording six receptions for 94 yards and two touchdowns while also returning one kick for four yards. He appeared in 11 games for the Stampeders during his final CFL season in 1964, catching 16 passes for 247 yards and three touchdowns while also recovering one fumble. He wore number 72 with the Stampeders from 1963 to 1964.

== Death ==
Claridge died on April 17, 1999.
