= Rene Riopelle =

Canadian football player (born 1942)

Profile
- Position: Defensive back

Personal information
- Born: April 12, 1942 (age 84); Mattawa, Ontario, Canada
- Listed height: 6 ft 0 in (1.83 m)
- Listed weight: 185 lb (84 kg)

Career history
- 1963, 1966: Hamilton Tiger-Cats
- 1964: Montreal Alouettes

Awards and highlights
- Grey Cup champion (1963)

Rene (Rip) Riopelle (born April 12, 1942) is a Canadian former professional football player who played for the Hamilton Tiger-Cats and Montreal Alouettes. He won the Grey Cup with the Tiger-Cats in 1963. He previously played football for the North Bay Tiger-Cats. He is a member of the North Bay Sports Hall of Fame.
