= Ed Ulmer =

American gridiron football player (1940–2000)

Profile
- Positions: Defensive back, Punter

Personal information
- Born: July 21, 1940
- Died: January 28, 2000 (aged 59)
- Listed height: 6 ft 2 in (1.88 m)
- Listed weight: 195 lb (88 kg)

Career information
- College: Ohio State

Career history
- 1963–1964: Ottawa Rough Riders
- 1965–1971: Winnipeg Blue Bombers

Awards and highlights
- CFL All-Star (1966); CFL West All-Star (1966)

Ed Ulmer (July 21, 1940 – January 28, 2000) was a Canadian Football League (CFL) defensive back and punter. Ulmer played college football at Ohio State. He started his playing career with Ottawa Rough Riders in 1963 and he moved for the Winnipeg Blue Bombers from 1965 to 1971.

Ed Ulmer played nine years in the CFL from 1963 to 1971. With smaller rosters than the NFL, the CFL has always prized versatility and Ulmer fit perfectly with that notion. Ulmer was an excellent defensive back, could fill in at running back, did the punting and was also used to return kickoffs and punts when needed. Ulmer joined the Ottawa Rough Riders late in the 1963 season, playing just two games, but still recording two interceptions. In 1964, Ulmer played 13 games for Ottawa, recording four interceptions and taking over the regular punting duties. Ulmer was traded to the Winnipeg Blue Bombers for the 1965 season and he finished his career with the Blue and Gold, playing seven seasons for them. Ulmer won one West All-Star selection (1966) and was also named a CFL All-Star that season at defensive back. In total, Ulmer racked up 31 career interceptions with a career best of 9 in his second last season in 1970 which tied him for best in the West along with teammate, Paul Brule and BC's Jerry Bradley. Ulmer scored four career touchdowns, two each in 1966 and 1967. Two of the touchdowns came on interception returns, one on a punt return and one on a rushing play. Ulmer led the West in punting average three times (1966, 1968 and 1969).

== Later life ==
Ulmer was later employed at the Manitoba Liquor Control Commission. He died in January 2000, at the age of 59. He was survived by his wife, Patsey, and three children.
