= Paul Fedor =

Paul Fedor may refer to:

- Paul Fedor (director), American music video director and visual effects designer
- Paul Fedor (Canadian football), Canadian football player
