= John Autry =

John Autry may refer to:

- John Autry (Canadian football) (1938–2001), American CFL footballer
- John Autry (politician) (born 1953), American politician
