= Lynn Bottoms =

Canadian football player

Profile
- Position: Defensive back

Personal information
- Born: July 2, 1933; Calgary, Alberta, Canada
- Died: December 22, 1995 (aged 62); Toronto, Ontario, Canada

Career information
- College: Washington

Career history
- 1954–1960: Calgary Stampeders
- 1960–1963: Toronto Argonauts

Awards and highlights
- Dr. Beattie Martin Trophy (1954); 3× CFL West All-Star (1955, 1956, 1957)

Lynn Bottoms (July 2, 1933 – December 22, 1995) was a Canadian defensive back and halfback who played in the Canadian Football League from 1954 to 1963.

A graduate of the University of Washington, signed with his hometown Calgary Stampeders in 1954. He won the Dr. Beattie Martin Trophy for best Canadian rookie in the west, with 379 yards rushing and 368 yards receiving, and one interception returned for a touchdown. He led the Stamps in rushing yards in 1955, with 402, and in his 10 years rushed for 1560 yards, caught 96 passes, and had 12 interceptions. In 1960 he was traded to the Toronto Argonauts, playing 40 regular season games and 5 playoff games. Though not an All-Star, Bottoms represented the West in three Shrine Game all-star games. He died on December 22, 1995, of a heart infection.
