= Billy Ray Locklin =

American gridiron football player (1936–2019)

Profile
- Position: Defensive end

Personal information
- Born: September 13, 1936; Rockdale, Texas, U.S.
- Died: November 8, 2019 (aged 83); Round Rock, Texas, U.S.
- Listed height: 6 ft 2 in (1.88 m)
- Listed weight: 225 lb (102 kg)

Career information
- College: New Mexico State
- AFL draft: 1960

Career history
- 1960: Oakland Raiders
- 1961–1964: Montreal Alouettes
- 1965–1970: Hamilton Tiger-Cats

Awards and highlights
- 2× Grey Cup champion (1965, 1967); 3× CFL All-Star (1965, 1966, 1968); 5× CFL East All-Star (1961, 1962, 1965, 1966, 1968)
- Stats at Pro Football Reference

Billy Ray Locklin (September 13, 1936 – November 8, 2019) was an American professional football defensive lineman who played ten seasons in the Canadian Football League (CFL) for two different teams. He was a CFL All Star three times.

Locklin started his pro career with the American Football League (AFL)'s Oakland Raiders. He played college football at New Mexico State University.
