= Roger Kramer =

American-Canadian football player and athlete (1939–2023)

Profile
- Position: Offensive tackle

Personal information
- Born: August 3, 1939; Kalamazoo, Michigan, U.S.
- Died: August 6, 2023 (aged 84); Edmonton, Alberta, Canada
- Listed height: 6 ft 5 in (1.96 m)
- Listed weight: 280 lb (127 kg)

Career information
- College: Kalamazoo College

Career history
- 1962: Montreal Alouettes
- 1963–1964: Ottawa Rough Riders
- 1965–1970: Calgary Stampeders

Awards and highlights
- 2× CFL All-Star (1963, 1964); 2× CFL East All-Star (1963, 1964); CFL West All-Star (1967)

Roger Kramer (August 3, 1939 – August 6, 2023) was an American athlete and professional Canadian Football League (CFL) player who played nine seasons in the CFL for three teams.

== Early life ==
Roger Kramer was born on August 3, 1939 in Kalamazoo, Michigan, and raised in Oklahoma City, Oklahoma. He attended Portage Central High and Kalamazoo College where he met his future wife, Ilona Krastins.

== Biography ==
Kramer was named CFL All-Star in 1963 and 1964. He played college football at Kalamazoo College from 1957 to 1959.

== Personal life and death ==
Kramer had two children, one of whom is American actor Eric Allan Kramer.

Roger remained in Canada following his football career. He died of dementia on August 6, 2023 in Edmonton, Alberta, three days after his 84th birthday.
