= Billy Wayte =

American gridiron football player (born 1938)

Profile
- Positions: Defensive back, running back

Personal information
- Born: July 3, 1938 (age 88); San Mateo, California, U.S.
- Listed height: 5 ft 10 in (1.78 m)
- Listed weight: 191 lb (87 kg)

Career information
- College: Fresno State

Career history
- 1961–1964: Montreal Alouettes
- 1965–1966: Hamilton Tiger Cats

Awards and highlights
- Grey Cup champion (1965); CFL All-Star (1965); CFL East All-Star (1965)

Billy Wayte was a Canadian Football League player whose main position was defensive back. He played for 2 teams from 1961 to 1966 and was part of the Hamilton Tiger Cats' 53rd Grey Cup-winning team in 1965.

After playing college football at Fresno State, Billy Wayte joined the Montreal Alouettes in 1961 and remained with them until 1964, mostly playing at the defensive back position, but also occasionally as a punt and kick returner. In 1963, he intercepted 5 passes, his highest total as an Alouette. In those four years, he only missed one game. In 1965, Wayte was traded to the Hamilton Tiger Cats, where he remained for two years, playing in all 14 games during both seasons. In 1965, he led the eastern conference with 9 interceptions, which helped Hamilton win the Grey Cup. That year, he was named eastern and CFL-all star. He intercepted 4 passes the following year and then abruptly retired at the young age of 27, returning to California as a high school teacher.
