= John Baker (defensive lineman, born 1942) =

American gridiron football player (born 1942)

No. 77, 72, 71, 87, 62
- Position: Defensive end

Personal information
- Born: August 15, 1942 (age 84); Detroit, Michigan, U.S.
- Listed height: 6 ft 5 in (1.96 m)
- Listed weight: 260 lb (118 kg)

Career information
- High school: I.C. Norcom (Portsmouth, Virginia)
- College: Norfolk State (1962-1963)
- NFL draft: 1964: 19th round, 265th overall pick

Career history
- Green Bay Packers (1964)*; Montreal Alouettes (1964–1969); New York Giants (1970); Hamilton Tiger-Cats (1971–1972); Houston Texans-Shreveport Steamer (1974); Birmingham Americans (1974)
- * Offseason or practice squad member only

Awards and highlights
- Grey Cup champion (1972); CFL All-Star (1967); 2× CFL Eastern All-Star (1965, 1967)
- Stats at Pro Football Reference

John Willey Alexander Baker, Jr. (born August 15, 1942) is an American former gridiron football player who played professionally for the New York Giants of the National Football League (NFL), the Hamilton Tiger-Cats and Montreal Alouettes of the Canadian Football League (CFL), and Birmingham Americans and Houston Texans of the World Football League (WFL). He won the Grey Cup with Hamilton in 1972. Baker played college football at Norfolk State University.
