= Ted Frechette =

Canadian football player (1940–2024)

Profile
- Position: Defensive back

Personal information
- Born: January 4, 1940; Edmonton, Alberta, Canada
- Died: August 1, 2024 (aged 84); Victoria, British Columbia, Canada

Career information
- University: Alberta

Career history
- 1962–1963: Edmonton Eskimos

Awards and highlights
- Dr. Beattie Martin Trophy (1962)

Theodore Daniel Frechette (January 4, 1940 – August 1, 2024) was a Canadian professional football player who played as a defensive back with the Edmonton Eskimos in the Canadian Football League from 1962 to 1963.

A graduate of the University of Alberta, Frechette joined the Eskimos in 1962, and on the strength of his one interception and 13 punt returns for 110 yards, won the Dr. Beattie Martin Trophy as top rookie in the west (when only Canadians were eligible for the award.) He played one more season with the Eskimos, returning 2 punts.
