= Milt Crain =

American gridiron football player (born 1937)

Profile
- Positions: Offensive tackle, center

Personal information
- Born: December 29, 1937 (age 88); New Albany, Mississippi, U.S.
- Listed height: 6 ft 5 in (1.96 m)
- Listed weight: 245 lb (111 kg)

Career information
- College: University of Mississippi
- NFL draft: 1959: 19thth round

Career history
- 1960–1964: Montreal Alouettes
- 1964–1964: Saskatchewan Roughriders

Awards and highlights
- CFL East All-Star (1963)

Milt Crain (born December 29, 1937) is a former Canadian Football League (CFL) offensive tackle and center from 1960 to 1964. He became an east division all-star at center for the Montreal Alouettes in 1963.

After playing college football at the University of Mississippi, Milt Crain was drafted by the Baltimore Colts in 1959 but never played a regular season game for them. Instead, he joined the Montreal Alouettes that year but was waived. He returned for another tryout the following year and this time stayed on with them to 1964. Although Crain played as an offensive tackle, he was switched to center in 1963 and was voted at that position as an East All-Star. However, in 1964, the Alouettes had many problems on offense, winding up the season as the lowest scoring team in the east, and he was released after playing only 4 games. Though picked up by the Saskatchewan Roughriders for 1 more game that same year, he never played another season.
