= Stroppa =

Stroppa is an Italian surname. Notable people with the surname include:

- Giovanni Stroppa (born 1968), Italian footballer and manager
- John Stroppa (1926–2017), Canadian football player
- Marco Stroppa (born 1959), Italian composer
