= 1965 Calgary Stampeders season =

Canadian football team season

- General manager: Rogers Lehew
- Head coach: Jerry Williams
- Home stadium: McMahon Stadium

Results
- Record: 12–4
- Division place: 1st, West
- Playoffs: Lost Western Finals

The 1965 Calgary Stampeders finished in first place in the Western Conference of the Canadian Football League with a 12–4 record. They were defeated in the Western Finals by the Winnipeg Blue Bombers.

== Regular season ==
=== Season standings ===
Western Football Conference
Team	GP	W	L	T	PF	PA	Pts
Calgary Stampeders	16	12	4	0	340	243	24
Winnipeg Blue Bombers	16	11	5	0	301	262	22
Saskatchewan Roughriders	16	8	7	1	276	277	17
BC Lions	16	6	9	1	286	273	13
Edmonton Eskimos	16	5	11	0	257	400	10

=== Season schedule ===
Week	Game	Date	Opponent	Results		Venue	Attendance
Week	Game	Date	Opponent	Score	Record	Venue	Attendance
	1		Saskatchewan Roughriders	W 37–8	1–0		
	2		Saskatchewan Roughriders	L 18–20	1–1		
	3		Winnipeg Blue Bombers	L 8–19	1–2		
	4		Edmonton Eskimos	W 16–15	2–2		
	5		Edmonton Eskimos	W 20–4	3–2		
	6		Hamilton Tiger-Cats	W 18–11	4–2		
	7		Winnipeg Blue Bombers	W 35–7	5–2		
	8		BC Lions	L 10–24	5–3		
	9		Saskatchewan Roughriders	W 15–12	6–3		
	10		BC Lions	W 21–7	7–3		
	11		Ottawa Rough Riders	W 31–18	8–3		
	12		Toronto Argonauts	W 27–26	9–3		
	13		Montreal Alouettes	W 36–21	10–3		
	14		Edmonton Eskimos	W 28–19	11–3		
	15		Edmonton Eskimos	L 0–22	11–4		
	16		BC Lions	W 20–10	12–4		

== Playoffs ==
=== Conference finals ===
Western-Finals – Game 1
Winnipeg Blue Bombers @ Calgary Stampeders
Date	Away	Home
November 13	Winnipeg Blue Bombers 9	Calgary Stampeders 27

Western Finals – Game 2
Calgary Stampeders @ Winnipeg Blue Bombers
Date	Away	Home
November 17	Calgary Stampeders 11	Winnipeg Blue Bombers 15

Western Finals – Game 3
Winnipeg Blue Bombers @ Calgary Stampeders
Date	Away	Home
November 20	Winnipeg Blue Bombers 19	Calgary Stampeders 12

- Winnipeg wins the best of three series 2–1. The Blue Bombers will advance to the Grey Cup Championship game.
