= 1965 Toronto Argonauts season =

CFL team season

- Head coach: Bob Shaw
- Home stadium: Exhibition Stadium

Results
- Record: 3–11
- Division place: 4th, East
- Playoffs: did not qualify

The 1965 Toronto Argonauts finished in fourth place in the Eastern Conference with a 3–11 record and failed to make the playoffs.

== Regular season ==
=== Standings ===
Eastern Football Conference
Team	GP	W	L	T	PF	PA	Pts
Hamilton Tiger-Cats	14	10	4	0	281	153	20
Ottawa Rough Riders	14	7	7	0	300	234	14
Montreal Alouettes	14	5	9	0	183	215	10
Toronto Argonauts	14	3	11	0	193	360	6

=== Schedule ===
Week	Date	Opponent	Result	Record	Venue	Attendance
1	Aug 6	vs. Ottawa Rough Riders	L 14–17	0–1	Exhibition Stadium	28,041
2	Aug 13	vs. Hamilton Tiger-Cats	L 7–17	0–2	Exhibition Stadium	27,190
3	Aug 18	at Montreal Alouettes	L 0–20	0–3	Molson Stadium	18,000
4	Aug 29	at BC Lions	L 1–36	0–4	Empire Stadium	30,855
4	Aug 31	at Edmonton Eskimos	L 21–23	0–5	Clarke Stadium	16,745
5	Sept 5	at Ottawa Rough Riders	L 21–41	0–6	Landsdowne Park	17,303
6	Sept 10	vs. Saskatchewan Roughriders	L 9–28	0–7	Exhibition Stadium	20,497
7	Sept 19	vs. Hamilton Tiger-Cats	L 0–33	0–8	Exhibition Stadium	22,854
8	Sept 26	vs. Winnipeg Blue Bombers	W 24–22	1–8	Exhibition Stadium	17,364
9	Oct 3	at Montreal Alouettes	L 8–25	1–9	Molson Stadium	17,000
10	Oct 8	vs. Calgary Stampeders	L 26–27	1–10	Exhibition Stadium	16,711
11	Oct 16	vs. Montreal Alouettes	W 24–21	2–10	Exhibition Stadium	18,693
12	Oct 24	at Ottawa Rough Riders	W 17–15	3–10	Landsdowne Park	13,487
13	Oct 31	at Hamilton Tiger-Cats	L 21–35	3–11	Civic Stadium	17,085
