= Cobequid Educational Centre =

Cobequid Education Centre
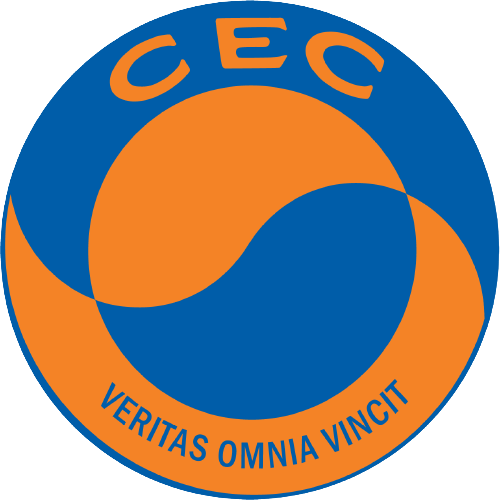

Location
- 34 Lorne Street; Truro, Nova Scotia, B2N 3K3; Canada

Information
- Type: High School
- Motto: Veritas Omnita Vincit (Truth Conquers All)
- Established: 1970
- School district: Chignecto Central Regional Centre for Education
- Principal: Chad MacPherson
- Faculty: 80
- Grades: 9-12
- Enrolment: ≈1500
- Colours: Orange and Blue
- Mascot: Cougar (Cecil)
- Website: cec.ccrce.ca

Cobequid Educational Centre (CEC) is a high school located in Truro, Nova Scotia, Canada.

CEC serves not only the town of Truro, but rural areas in Central and West Colchester County. The school is one of the largest high schools in the province of Nova Scotia, with approximately 1500 students and 90 teaching staff.

== History ==
CEC opened in September 1970 as an experiment in amalgamating rural high schools in Nova Scotia. As well as serving as a replacement for the former Truro Senior High School, (which was also known by an earlier name, the Colchester Academy), CEC also replaced the former Central Colchester High School and West Colchester High School, which became junior high schools (grades five to nine for the newly renamed West Colchester Junior High School and grades six to nine for the newly renamed Central Colchester Junior High School). When CEC opened, it was operated by the Colchester-East Hants Amalgamated School Board. As a result of the amalgamation of school boards in Nova Scotia, CEC is now operated by the Chignecto-Central Regional Centre for Education.

== Academics ==
CEC offers students the option to participate in an academic program referred to the International Baccalaureate program; this makes CEC an IB World School. The International Baccalaureate is a worldwide educational foundation with more than 4700 IB World Schools. The specific program offered at CEC is the IB Diploma Programme, which students take in grades 11 and 12. Upon starting high school, students are given the option to take courses in grade 10 that are referred to as Pre-IB courses. These classes are available to students who are considering taking the IB Diploma Programme. The Pre-IB classes are not associated with the IB program, but are designed by the school to help students ease their way into the IB program or help them make their decision to participate in the program or not. Students also have the option to take some IB classes, while not fully enrolling in the IB program. By doing so these students will receive an IB Certificate instead of a Diploma upon graduating.

To receive an IB Diploma, students must complete a six core subject curriculum, which includes language and literature, language acquisition, individuals and societies, sciences, mathematics, and the arts. They must also write an essay of up to 4000 words, known as the Extended Essay, complete externally assessed exams, two formal projects, and a minimum of 50 hours of community service (AKA CAS hours, which stands for Creative, Activity, Service). In some instances, depending on the university, IB courses can be used as a transfer credit or a fulfillment of university degree requirements. This can benefit some high school graduates when they attend university or college, but it can be inferred that merely taking the IB Diploma Programme or IB courses can set up a student for success in university.

Students are also able to take numerous French immersion courses, and by meeting specific required credits hours they can obtain a French Immersion Certificate. This grants that the student is officially bilingual. Many subjects are also offered as Integrated French classes. Upon completing certain required credits, much like the French immersion program, a student would be awarded an Integrated French Certificate at the end of their grade 12 year. This certificate indicates that the student is officially 'partially bilingual'. Standard Core French classes are also offered to students for grades 9, 10, 11, and 12.

== Sports and athletics ==
Since the founding year, CEC has had numerous sports teams. All of the competitive sports include football, soccer, volleyball, basketball, hockey, curling, bowling, weight lifting, cross country, track and field, golf, wrestling, skiing, snowboarding, rugby, badminton, softball, baseball, and table tennis. CEC participates in the Nova Scotia School Athletic Federation (NSSAF) and has won many banner titles over the years. The athletic motto is 'a tradition of excellence' and athletics at CEC are a large part of many students high school experience because of the vast amount of sport opportunities and competitive tradition.

In 2018, the boys volleyball team started their season with a three straight tournament winning streak. In the third tournament, the annual Dalhousie University high school tournament, the cougars went undefeated in the round-robin with straight-set wins over Citadel Phoenix (25–14, 25–5) and Horton Griffins (25–11, 25–16). In the quarterfinal, the boys won over the Dartmouth Spartans (25–16, 25–14) and in the semifinal won over Auburn Drive Eagles (25–11, 25–16). To win it all, the cougars defeated Par-en-Bas in the final 25-22 (set 1), 25-23 (set 2).

CEC has also shown success in track and field, with the team winning seven championship banners at the NSSAF track and field championships at Beazley Field in Dartmouth in 2017. The cougars set a new NSSAF individual record and three new school records, by winning the overall Division I title, Intermediate Girls and Boys, and Senior Girls and Boys divisions. This marks the second time a Nova Scotia school has done so, the first being 25 years ago (also accomplished by CEC).

The CEC track and field team were champions in the following categories:

- Intermediate Girls Provincial Champions with 107 points
- Intermediate Boys Provincial Champions with 135 points
- Intermediate Banner (Combined Boys and Girls) with 242 points
- Senior Girls Provincial Champions with 134.5 points
- Senior Boys Provincial Champions with 171 points
- Senior Banner (Combined Boys and Girls) with 305.5 points
- Div. I Banner with 547.5 points

There were also provincial records set by some of the Cobequid athletes. Michael Adams broke the CEC and provincial record in Intermediate Boys javelin; he threw 51.86 metres. The Intermediate Boys 4x100 metre relay team, members Kamryn Matheson, Cameron Degroot, Brody Schmidt and Zach Richards, set a new CEC record for the event by finishing in 45.98 seconds. Kamryn Matheson set another new CEC record, he ran the 200 metre event in 23.1 seconds to achieve the Intermediate Boys 200 metres CEC title.

In basketball, CEC has hosted their annual Snowball Tournament since the school year of 1970–1971 to present.

== Clubs and activities ==
Past and present clubs offered at CEC include yearbook committee, reach for the top, debate club, French club, student council, symphonic band, jazz band, pit band, gaming club, art club, shared reading, chess club, 5K run club, tennis club, prom committee, kick boxing, math league, programming club, interact club, drama club, international club, cougar cafe, and choir.

== Dedication ==
On February 28, 2023, CEC students petitioned to and subsequently renamed the auditorium in honour of Portia White, Truro-born singer for African Heritage Month.

== Notable faculty and alumni ==
- Jamie Baillie, businessman and politician
- Terry Baker, CFL kicker
- Cory Bowles, actor
- Jeff Douglas, actor
- Page Fletcher, actor
- Brett Lauther, CFL kicker
- Leo McKay, Jr., author
- Justin Palardy, CFL kicker
- Kathryn Smith, author
- Lenore Zann, actress and politician
