= Larry Robinson (Canadian football) =

Canadian football player (1942–2018)

No. 15
- Positions: Defensive back, kicker

Personal information
- Born: April 18, 1942; Calgary, Alberta, Canada
- Died: July 18, 2018 (aged 76)
- Listed height: 6 ft 0 in (1.83 m)
- Listed weight: 200 lb (91 kg)

Career information
- College: Mount Royal College

Career history
- 1961–1975: Calgary Stampeders

Awards and highlights
- Grey Cup champion (1971); 2× Dave Dryburgh Memorial Trophy (1964, 1965); Dr. Beattie Martin Trophy (1961); 3× CFL West All-Star (1965, 1971, 1972)
- Canadian Football Hall of Fame (Class of 1998)

Larry Robinson (April 18, 1942 – July 18, 2018) was a Canadian professional football player who played as a defensive back and placekicker for fifteen seasons in the Canadian Football League for the Calgary Stampeders from 1961 to 1975.

== Calgary ==
As a member of the Calgary Stampeders, Larry Robinson played in three Grey Cup games: the 56th Grey Cup of 1968, lost to the Ottawa Rough Riders; the 58th Grey Cup of 1970, lost to the Montreal Alouettes; and the 59th Grey Cup of 1971, won against the Toronto Argonauts. Robinson was one of the best safety backs of his era. During the 1970 CFL season, Calgary met the Saskatchewan Roughriders in the Western conference finals. In the last game of the best-of-three series, with Saskatchewan leading 14–12, Robinson kicked a dramatic field goal with a few seconds remaining.

Robinson was a CFL West All-Star in 1965, 1971, and 1972. Throughout his career, he never missed a game.

Robinson died from cancer on July 18, 2018, at the age of 76.

== Awards and honors ==
In 1961, Larry Robinson won the Dr. Beattie Martin Trophy as the top rookie in the Western Conference. Robinson was also runner up for the CFL's Most Outstanding Canadian Award in 1964 and 1965. For his strong defensive play and accurate place kicking, he was inducted into the Canadian Football Hall of Fame in 1998.
