= Ron Forwick =

Profile
- Position: Defensive end

Personal information
- Born: October 5, 1943; Edmonton, Alberta, Canada
- Died: July 2, 2001 (aged 57); Edmonton, Alberta, Canada
- Listed height: 6 ft 4 in (1.93 m)
- Listed weight: 245 lb (111 kg)

Career information
- CJFL: Edmonton Huskies

Career history
- 1965–1974: Edmonton Eskimos
- 1975: Hamilton Tiger-Cats

Awards and highlights
- CFL West All-Star(1970); Dr. Beattie Martin Trophy (1965)

Ron Forwick (October 5, 1943 - July 2, 2001) was an all-star defensive end who played in the Canadian Football League from 1965 to 1975.

Forwick jumped from the junior ranks, with the Edmonton Huskies, to his hometown Edmonton Eskimos in 1965, winning the Dr. Beattie Martin Trophy as top Canadian rookie in the west. He was a stalwart on the Esk's defensive line during their lean years, being named an all-star in 1970. He was traded to the Hamilton Tiger-Cats in 1975, his final season, this being the year the Eskimos finally won the Grey Cup.

Forwick died of cancer on July 2, 2001. On September 25, 2002 the Edmonton Eskimo Football club announced the dedication of Forwick Field, adjacent to Husky House in Kinsman Park.
