= Gordon Brown (Canadian football) =

Canadian football player

Porky Brown
Profile
- Position: Guard

Personal information
- Born: 1927; Victoria, British Columbia
- Died: December 20, 1987 (aged 60); Calgary, Alberta

Career information
- College: St. Martin's

Career history
- 1950–1951: Calgary Stampeders
- 1953–1960: Calgary Stampeders

Awards and highlights
- Dr. Beattie Martin Trophy (1950); CFL West All-Star (1953)

Robert Gordon "Porky" Brown (1927 – December 20, 1987) was an all-star guard in the Canadian Football League.

A native of Victoria, Brown was winner of the 1950 Dr. Beattie Martin Trophy for Canadian rookie of the year in the west. He went on to a 10-season professional football career with the Calgary Stampeders (he sat out 1952) and was named an all-star in 1953. Brown retired in 1960.

In 1961, Brown became a defensive line coach for the Calgary Wranglers.
