= Al Benecick =

American gridiron football player (1937–2015)

No. 66
- Position: Offensive lineman

Personal information
- Born: March 20, 1937; Bristol, Connecticut, U.S.
- Died: September 29, 2015 (aged 78); Tallahassee, Florida, U.S.
- Listed height: 6 ft 1 in (1.85 m)
- Listed weight: 240 lb (109 kg)

Career information
- College: Syracuse
- NFL draft: 1959: 6th round, 62nd overall pick

Career history

Playing
- 1959–1968: Saskatchewan Roughriders
- 1969: Edmonton Eskimos

Coaching
- 1970–1971: Edmonton Eskimos (Line Coach)

Awards and highlights
- Grey Cup champion (1966); 3× CFL All-Star (1964, 1965, 1966); 4× CFL West All-Star (1963–1966)
- Canadian Football Hall of Fame (Class of 1996)

Al Benecick (March 20, 1937 – September 29, 2015) was an American professional football offensive lineman who played for the Saskatchewan Roughriders of the Canadian Football League (CFL) from 1959 to 1968. He was part of the Grey Cup championship-winning Roughriders in 1966. Benecick retired as a member of the Edmonton Eskimos in 1969.

During Benecick's time as a member of the Roughriders, he was named to the CFL's Western All-Star team four times.

Benecick was inducted into the Canadian Football Hall of Fame in 1996. He died on September 29, 2015.
