= Ron Brewer (Canadian football) =

Canadian football player (1937–2024)

Profile
- Position: Linebacker

Personal information
- Born: March 11, 1937; Toronto, Ontario, Canada
- Died: May 15, 2024 (aged 87); Burlington, Ontario, Canada
- Listed height: 6 ft 1 in (1.85 m)
- Listed weight: 215 lb (98 kg)

Career information
- University: Parkdale

Career history
- 1958–1960: Toronto Argonauts
- 1961–1962: Montreal Alouettes
- 1963–1965: Toronto Argonauts
- 1966: Edmonton Eskimos
- 1967: Hamilton Tiger-Cats

Awards and highlights
- Grey Cup champion (1967); CFL All-Star (1964); 3× CFL East All-Star( 1961, 1964, 1965); 1958 - Gruen Trophy (best rookie in East)

Ronald William Brewer (March 11, 1937 – May 15, 2024) was a Canadian professional football linebacker who played ten seasons in the Canadian Football League for the Toronto Argonauts, Montreal Alouettes, Edmonton Eskimos and the Hamilton Tiger-Cats.

He was named for the all-Argonaut Team in 1974 for the modern era of 1945–1973, selected by the Argonaut alumni and the sports media.
