= Dr. Beattie Martin Trophy =

Canadian football award

The Dr. Beattie Martin Trophy is a Canadian Football League award, given to the most outstanding Canadian player in the West Division. Each team nominates a player for this award, from which the winner is chosen. Either the winner of this trophy or the winner of the Lew Hayman Trophy will also win the Canadian Football League Most Outstanding Canadian award.

The Martin trophy is named after former Saskatchewan Roughriders president Beattie Martin. Originally presented in 1949, it served as the Western Interprovincial Football Union's award for the outstanding Canadian rookie until 1974. As part of the failed American expansion, the Martin trophy was awarded in 1995 to the North Division's outstanding Canadian.

== For Outstanding Canadian Player of the West Division (1974–present) ==
- 2025 – Nathan Rourke (QB), BC Lions
- 2024 – Brady Oliveira (RB), Winnipeg Blue Bombers
- 2023 – Brady Oliveira (RB), Winnipeg Blue Bombers
- 2022 – Nathan Rourke (QB), BC Lions
- 2021 – Boseko Lokombo (LB), BC Lions
- 2020 – Season cancelled due to COVID-19
- 2019 – Cameron Judge (LB), Saskatchewan Roughriders
- 2018 – Andrew Harris (RB), Winnipeg Blue Bombers
- 2017 – Andrew Harris (RB), Winnipeg Blue Bombers
- 2016 – Jerome Messam (RB), Calgary Stampeders
- 2015 – Jamaal Westerman (LB), Winnipeg Blue Bombers
- 2014 – Jon Cornish (RB), Calgary Stampeders
- 2013 – Jon Cornish (RB), Calgary Stampeders
- 2012 – Jon Cornish (RB), Calgary Stampeders
- 2011 – Jerome Messam (RB), Edmonton Eskimos
- 2010 – Andy Fantuz (SB), Saskatchewan Roughriders
- 2009 – Ricky Foley (DE), BC Lions
- 2008 – Kamau Peterson (WR), Edmonton Eskimos
- 2007 – Jason Clermont (SB), BC Lions
- 2006 – Brent Johnson (DE), BC Lions
- 2005 – Brent Johnson (DE), BC Lions
- 2004 – Jason Clermont (SB), BC Lions
- 2003 – Chris Szarka (FB), Saskatchewan Roughriders
- 2002 – Sean Millington (RB), BC Lions
- 2001 – Cameron Legault (DT), BC Lions
- 2000 – Sean Millington (RB), BC Lions
- 1999 – Jamie Taras (C), BC Lions
- 1998 – Vince Danielsen (SB), Calgary Stampeders
- 1997 – Sean Millington (FB), BC Lions
- 1996 – Leroy Blugh (DE), Edmonton Eskimos
- 1995 – Larry Wruck (LB), Edmonton Eskimos
- 1994 – Larry Wruck (LB), Edmonton Eskimos
- 1993 – Dave Sapunjis (SB), Calgary Stampeders
- 1992 – Ray Elgaard (SB), Saskatchewan Roughriders
- 1991 – Blake Marshall (FB), Edmonton Eskimos
- 1990 – Ray Elgaard (SB), Saskatchewan Roughriders
- 1989 – Jeff Fairholm (SB), Saskatchewan Roughriders
- 1988 – Ray Elgaard (SB), Saskatchewan Roughriders
- 1987 – Nelson Martin (DS), BC Lions
- 1986 – Joe Poplawski (SB), Winnipeg Blue Bombers
- 1985 – Joe Poplawski (SB), Winnipeg Blue Bombers
- 1984 – Joe Poplawski (SB), Winnipeg Blue Bombers
- 1983 – Paul Bennett (DB), Winnipeg Blue Bombers
- 1982 – Rick House (SB), Winnipeg Blue Bombers
- 1981 – Joe Poplawski (SB), Winnipeg Blue Bombers
- 1980 – Dave Fennell (DT), Edmonton Eskimos
- 1979 – Dave Fennell (DT), Edmonton Eskimos
- 1978 – Joe Poplawski (WR), Winnipeg Blue Bombers
- 1977 – Gord Paterson (TE), Winnipeg Blue Bombers
- 1976 – Bill Baker (DE), BC Lions
- 1975 – Tom Forzani (WR), Calgary Stampeders
- 1974 – Rudy Linterman (WR), Calgary Stampeders

== Outstanding Canadian player in the West Division prior to 1974 ==
- 1973 – Dave Cutler (K), Edmonton Eskimos
- 1972 – Jim Young (WR), BC Lions
- 1971 – Dick Dupuis (DB), Edmonton Eskimos
- 1970 – Jim Young (WR), BC Lions
- 1969 – Jim Young (WR), BC Lions
- 1968 – Ken Nielsen (F), Winnipeg Blue Bombers
- 1967 – Terry Evanshen (WR), Calgary Stampeders
- 1966 – Terry Evanshen (WR), Calgary Stampeders
- 1965 – Larry Robinson (DB), Calgary Stampeders
- 1964 – Larry Robinson (DB), Calgary Stampeders
- 1963 – Dale West (DB), Saskatchewan Roughriders
- 1962 – Harvey Wylie (DB), Calgary Stampeders
- 1961 – Tony Pajaczkowski (OG), Calgary Stampeders
- 1960 – Tony Pajaczkowski (OG), Calgary Stampeders
- 1959 – Don Getty (QB), Edmonton Eskimos
- 1958 – Gord Rowland (LB), Winnipeg Blue Bombers
- 1957 – Gerry James (RB), Winnipeg Blue Bombers
- 1956 – Normie Kwong (RB), Edmonton Eskimos
- 1955 – Normie Kwong, Edmonton Eskimos & Gerry James, Winnipeg Blue Bombers
- 1954 – Gerry James (RB), Winnipeg Blue Bombers

== For Outstanding Rookie Player of the WIFU and the Western Football Conference (1949–1973) ==
- 1973 – Lorne Richardson (DB), Saskatchewan Roughriders
- 1972 – Walt McKee (K/P), Winnipeg Blue Bombers
- 1971 – Bob Kraemer (WR), Winnipeg Blue Bombers
- 1970 – John Senst (WR), Winnipeg Blue Bombers
- 1969 – Dave Easley (DB), BC Lions
- 1968 – Dave Cranmer (RB), Calgary Stampeders
- 1967 – Ted Gerela (K), BC Lions
- 1966 – Garry Lefebvre (WR/P), Edmonton Eskimos
- 1965 – Ron Forwick (DE), Edmonton Eskimos
- 1964 – Billy Cooper (WR), Winnipeg Blue Bombers
- 1963 – Peter Kempf (K/TE), BC Lions
- 1962 – Ted Frechette (DB/RB), Edmonton Eskimos
- 1961 – Larry Robinson (DB), Calgary Stampeders
- 1960 – Neal Beaumont (DB), BC Lions
- 1959 – Henry Janzen (DB), Winnipeg Blue Bombers
- 1958 – Walt Radzick (DT), Calgary Stampeders
- 1957 – Mike Lashuk (FB), Edmonton Eskimos
- 1956 – Norm Rauhaus (DB), Winnipeg Blue Bombers
- 1955 – Harry Lunn (HB), Saskatchewan Roughriders
- 1954 – Lynn Bottoms (HB), Calgary Stampeders
- 1953 – Gordon Sturtridge (DE), Saskatchewan Roughriders
- 1952 – Lorne Benson (FB), Winnipeg Blue Bombers
- 1951 – Jim Chambers (HB), Edmonton Eskimos
- 1950 – Gordon Brown (DG), Calgary Stampeders
- 1949 – John Stroppa (HB), Winnipeg Blue Bombers

See Jackie Parker Trophy to view other recipients of an award given to the most outstanding rookie in the West Division.
