= Walt Radzick =

Canadian Football League defensive tackle

Profile
- Position: Defensive tackle

Personal information
- Born: May 25, 1935; Saint Boniface, Manitoba, Canada
- Died: March 31, 2005 (aged 69); Toronto, Ontario, Canada

Career information
- College: University of Toronto

Career history
- 1956: Toronto Balmy Beach Beachers
- 1958–59: Calgary Stampeders
- 1960–64: Toronto Argonauts
- 1965: Hamilton Tiger-Cats

Awards and highlights
- Grey Cup champion (1965); Dr. Beattie Martin Trophy (1958)

Walter Raymond Radzick (May 25, 1935 – March 31, 2005) was a Canadian professional football defensive tackle who played in the Canadian Football League from 1958 to 1965.

A graduate of the University of Toronto, Radzick first played football with the Toronto Balmy Beach Beachers of the Ontario Rugby Football Union. In 1958 he signed with the Calgary Stampeders where he won the Dr. Beattie Martin Trophy for best Canadian rookie in the west (with 1 interception and 2 fumble recoveries.) In 1960 he returned to Toronto, starting 5 seasons with the Argonauts; 66 regular season games and 5 playoff games. He finished his career playing 6 games with the Hamilton Tiger-Cats in 1965 (the year they won the Grey Cup.) As an Argonaut, Radzick missed only one game from 1961 to 1964. He died in 2005 in Toronto at the age of 69.
