= Jim Conroy (Canadian football) =

Canadian gridiron football player (1936–2011)

No. 25
- Positions: Linebacker, Running back, Punter

Personal information
- Born: October 18, 1936; Vancouver, British Columbia, Canada
- Died: October 3, 2011 (aged 74); Ottawa, Ontario, Canada
- Listed height: 6 ft 0 in (1.83 m)
- Listed weight: 205 lb (93 kg)

Career information
- College: USC
- AFL draft: 1960

Career history
- 1960–1967: Ottawa Rough Riders
- 1968: Winnipeg Blue Bombers

Awards and highlights
- Grey Cup champion (1960); 3× CFL All-Star (1962, 1963, 1966); 3× CFL East All-Star (1962, 1963, 1966)

James Conroy (October 18, 1936 – October 3, 2011) was a Canadian Football League (CFL) linebacker for the Ottawa Rough Riders (1960–1967) and the Winnipeg Blue Bombers (1968). He was a CFL All-Star for three seasons.

After playing college football and baseball at the University of Southern California, Jim Conroy joined the Ottawa Rough Riders in 1960, the year they won the 48th Grey Cup of 1960, remaining with the same team until 1967. He was mainly used as a linebacker, intercepting 10 balls, but also as a reserve running back, reaching a maximum of 12 carries in 1967, as well as a punt and kick returner. In addition, he was the Rough Riders' punter from 1960 to 1962. He spent his final year as a member of the Winnipeg Blue Bombers.
