= Harry Lunn =

Profile
- Position: Halfback

Personal information
- Born: February 11, 1933
- Died: September 22, 2016 (aged 83); Hamilton, Ontario, Canada

Career information
- College: none - Hamilton Panthers (ORFU Intermediate)

Career history
- 1955–58: Saskatchewan Roughriders
- 1959: Ottawa Rough Riders
- 1960: Hamilton Tiger-Cats

Awards and highlights
- Dr. Beattie Martin Trophy (1955); WIFU All-Star (1958)

Harry Bateman Lunn (February 11, 1933 – September 22, 2016) was a halfback who played in the Canadian Football League from 1955 to 1960.

Lunn was discovered by Saskatchewan Roughriders coach Frank Filchock in 1954 playing for the Hamilton Panthers of the ORFU Intermediate league. He paid immediate dividends for his new team, winning the 1955 Dr. Beattie Martin Trophy for best Canadian rookie in the west on the strength of his 175 rushing yards and his league leading punt and kick off returns. His best season was 1957, with 326 rushing yards, and he intercepted 12 passes during his career. He also represented the West in the 1958 Shrine Game. He died in 2016 at the age of 83.
