= John Senst =

No. 74 (CGY)
- Position: Flanker

Career information
- College: Simon Fraser University

Career history
- 1970: Winnipeg Blue Bombers
- 1971–1973: Calgary Stampeders

Awards and highlights
- Grey Cup champion (1971); Dr. Beattie Martin Trophy (1970)

John Senst is a former award-winning and Grey Cup champion flanker and playwright who played in the Canadian Football League from 1970 to 1973.

He was born in the United Kingdom, spent his childhood in Ontario, and attended college in Vancouver. Senst started his career with the Winnipeg Blue Bombers in 1970, catching 22 passes for 393 yards, and was winner of the Dr. Beattie Martin Trophy for Canadian rookie of the year in the west. He played 3 seasons with the Calgary Stampeders, catching 25 passes for 352 yards and winning the Grey Cup in 1971. He finished with 59 receptions for 933 yards and 2 touchdowns.

In 1973, he released The King of Mandragoras, which premiered in the Centennial Planetarium in Calgary. Previously, he had contributed to poetry magazines in Alberta and had released the moderately successful Am I My Brother's Keeper.
