= Norm Stoneburgh =

Canadian football player (1935–2019)

Profile
- Position: Centre

Personal information
- Born: March 31, 1935; Toronto, Ontario, Canada
- Died: October 24, 2019 (aged 84); Toronto, Ontario, Canada
- Listed height: 6 ft 2 in (1.88 m)
- Listed weight: 250 lb (113 kg)

Career history
- 1955–1967: Toronto Argonauts

Awards and highlights
- CFL All-Star (1965); 4× CFL East All-Star (1958, 1960, 1961, 1965)

Norman Joseph Stoneburgh (March 31, 1935 – October 24, 2019) was an all-star center who played thirteen seasons in the Canadian Football League for the Toronto Argonauts.

After playing in the Toronto Argonauts farm system, Stoneburgh joined the big team in 1955 and played his entire 13-year career with them as a center. Stoneburgh first made CFL east all-star in 1958. Although he fractured a leg in 1959 and did not play a single game, he came back strong with CFL east all-star nominations in 1960 and 1961. He suffered another serious setback in the 1962 pre-season by being hit with a golf ball in the eye. Nevertheless, he played in 10 games. For the next 5 years, the football veteran played all 14 games of the regular season 4 times and became a CFL all-star in 1965.

Following his retirement he volunteered his time at Evangel Hall in Toronto, Ontario. He died on October 24, 2019, at age 84.
