= John Autry (Canadian football) =

American gridiron football player (1938–2001)

Profile
- Positions: Defensive end, Halfback, Guard

Personal information
- Born: February 17, 1938; Quinlan, Texas, U.S.
- Died: March 11, 2001 (aged 63); Port Arthur, Texas, U.S.
- Listed height: 6 ft 1 in (1.85 m)
- Listed weight: 230 lb (104 kg)

Career history
- 1963: Toronto Argonauts
- 1964: Hamilton Tiger-Cats

Awards and highlights
- CFL East All-Star (1963)

John L. Autry (February 17, 1938 – March 11, 2001) was an American professional football player who played for the Toronto Argonauts and Hamilton Tiger-Cats. He played college football at Prairie View A&M University. Autry died in Port Arthur, Texas on March 11, 2001, at the age of 63.
