= 1965 Hamilton Tiger-Cats season =

Season of Canadian Football League team the Hamilton Tiger-Cats

- Head coach: Ralph Sazio
- Home stadium: Civic Stadium

Results
- Record: 10–4
- Division place: 1st, East
- Playoffs: Won Grey Cup

The 1965 Hamilton Tiger-Cats finished in first place in the Eastern Conference with a 10–4 record and won the Grey Cup over the Winnipeg Blue Bombers.

== Preseason ==
Game	Date	Opponent	Results		Venue	Attendance
Game	Date	Opponent	Score	Record	Venue	Attendance
A	July 20	at Winnipeg Blue Bombers	L 0–25	0–1		13,334
B	July 27	at Montreal Alouettes	W 35–15	1–1		14,000
B	July 29	vs. Toronto Argonauts	L 15–18	1–2		9,000

== Regular season ==
=== Season standings ===
Eastern Football Conference
Team	GP	W	L	T	PF	PA	Pts
Hamilton Tiger-Cats	14	10	4	0	281	153	20
Ottawa Rough Riders	14	7	7	0	300	234	14
Montreal Alouettes	14	5	9	0	183	215	10
Toronto Argonauts	14	3	11	0	193	360	6

=== Season schedule ===
Week	Game	Date	Opponent	Results		Venue	Attendance
Week	Game	Date	Opponent	Score	Record	Venue	Attendance
1	1	Aug 7	vs. Montreal Alouettes	W 18–9	1–0		21,735
2	2	Aug 13	at Toronto Argonauts	W 17–7	2–0		27,190
3	3	Aug 21	vs. Ottawa Rough Riders	W 27–1	3–0		26,000
4	4	Aug 28	at Calgary Stampeders	L 11–18	3–1		18,800
5	5	Aug 31	at Saskatchewan Roughriders	W 30–6	4–1		17,530
5	6	Sept 6	vs. Montreal Alouettes	W 17–2	5–1		27,000
6	7	Sept 11	at Ottawa Rough Riders	L 13–22	5–2		22,491
7	8	Sept 19	at Toronto Argonauts	W 33–0	6–2		22,854
8	9	Sept 28	vs. Edmonton Eskimos	L 3–9	6–3		18,575
9	10	Oct 3	at Winnipeg Blue Bombers	L 21–26	6–4		16,542
10	11	Oct 11	vs. Ottawa Rough Riders	W 25–23	7–4		27,755
11	12	Oct 17	vs. BC Lions	W 25–7	8–4		26,803
12	13	Oct 23	at Montreal Alouettes	W 6–2	9–4		17,000
13	14	Oct 31	vs. Toronto Argonauts	W 35–21	10–4		

== Playoffs ==
=== Schedule ===
Round	Date	Opponent	Results		Venue	Attendance
Round	Date	Opponent	Score	Record	Venue	Attendance
Eastern Final #1	Nov 14	at Ottawa Rough Riders	W 18–13	1–0		20,271
Eastern Final #2	Nov 20	vs. Ottawa Rough Riders	W 17–7	2–0		21,530
Grey Cup	Nov 27	Winnipeg Blue Bombers	W 22–16	3–0		32,655

==== Grey Cup ====
Teams	Q1	Q2	Q3	Q4	Final
Hamilton Tiger-Cats	7	7	5	3	22
Winnipeg Blue Bombers	7	3	3	3	16
