= Walt McKee =

Northern Irish-born Canadian football player (1949–2026)

Profile
- Positions: Kicker, Punter

Personal information
- Born: June 28, 1949; Belfast, Northern Ireland
- Died: July 18, 2026 (aged 77); Manitoba, Canada

Career information
- University: Manitoba

Career history
- 1972–1974: Winnipeg Blue Bombers
- 1975: Edmonton Eskimos

Awards and highlights
- Grey Cup champion (1975); Dr. Beattie Martin Trophy (1972)

Walt McKee (June 28, 1949 – July 18, 2026) was a Canadian award winning and Grey Cup champion kicker who played in the Canadian Football League from 1972 to 1975.

A graduate of University of Manitoba and member of the Bison's 1969 and 70 championship teams, McKee joined the Winnipeg Blue Bombers in 1972 and, with 108 punts for a 41.5 yard average, was winner of the Dr. Beattie Martin Trophy for Canadian rookie of the year in the west. He was second in the league in punting average the next 2 seasons (with 44.2 and 41.8 yards.) He also was a place kicker, handling kickoffs but making only 27 of his 69 field goal attempts. He finished his career with the Edmonton Eskimos, playing 6 games and punting 36 times for a 41.8 yard average in 1975, the year they won the Grey Cup.

McKee died on July 18, 2026, at the age of 77.
