= Brett Lauther =

Canadian gridiron football player (born 1990)

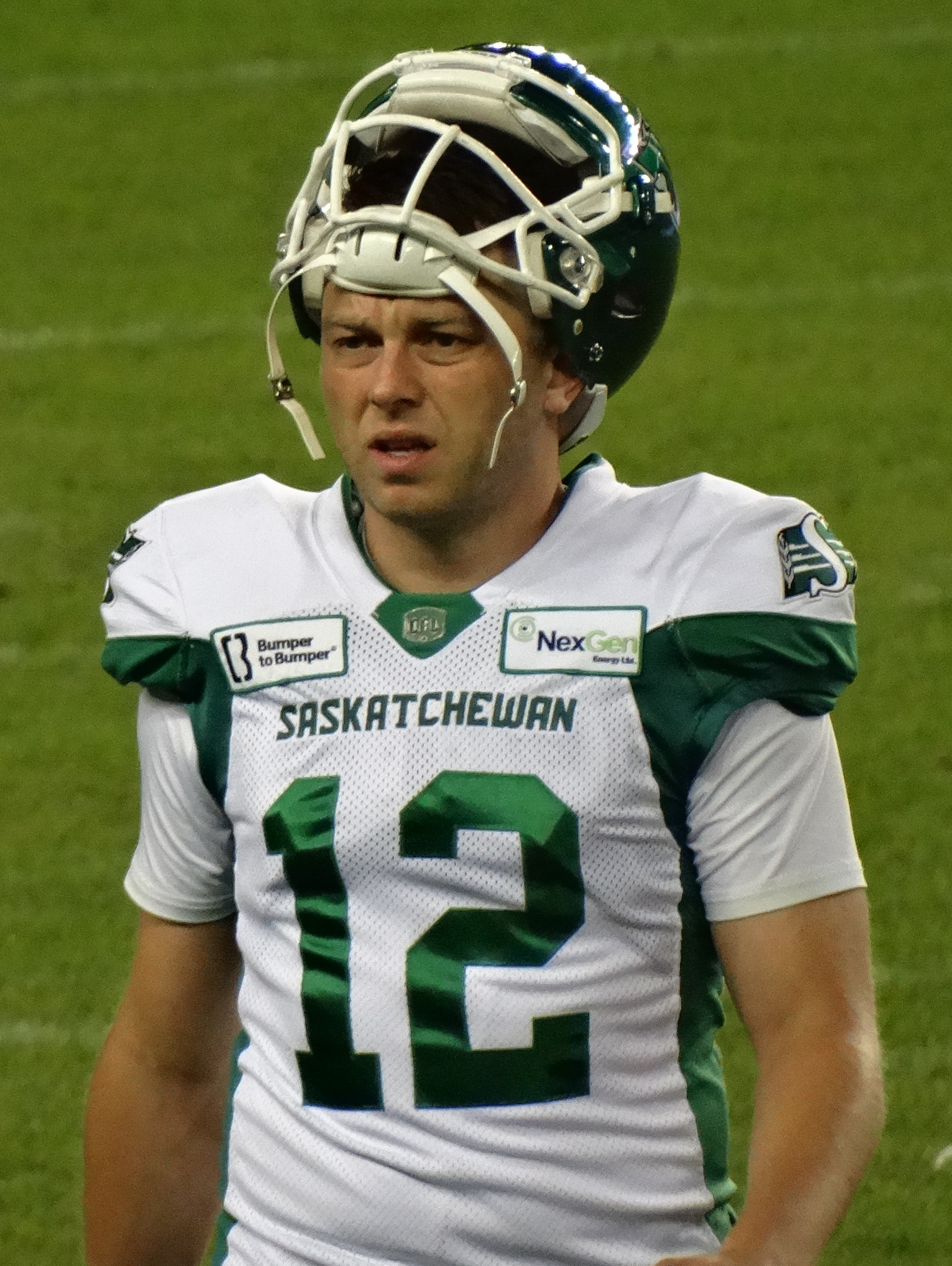
- Lauther with the Saskatchewan Roughriders in 2024

Saskatchewan Roughriders
- Position: Placekicker
- Roster status: Active
- CFL status: National

Personal information
- Born: November 4, 1990 (age 36); Truro, Nova Scotia, Canada
- Listed height: 6 ft 0 in (1.83 m)
- Listed weight: 195 lb (88 kg)

Career information
- High school: Truro (NS) CEC
- University: Saint Mary's
- CFL draft: 2013: 7th round, 53rd overall pick

Career history
- 2013–2014: Hamilton Tiger-Cats
- 2015: Saskatchewan Roughriders*
- 2015: Toronto Argonauts*
- 2017: Saskatchewan Roughriders*
- 2017: Edmonton Eskimos*
- 2018–2025: Saskatchewan Roughriders
- 2026: Ottawa Redblacks
- 2026–present: Saskatchewan Roughriders
- * Offseason or practice squad member only

Awards and highlights
- Grey Cup champion (2025); CFL West All-Star (2018); 2× Dave Dryburgh Memorial Trophy (2018, 2024); Tom Pate Memorial Award (2023)

Career CFL statistics
- Games played: 118
- Field goals made: 301
- Field goals attempted: 370
- Field goal %: 81.4
- Longest field goal: 59
- Stats at CFL.ca

Brett Lauther (born November 4, 1990) is a Canadian professional football placekicker for the Saskatchewan Roughriders of the Canadian Football League (CFL). He was named a CFL West Division All-Star in 2018 and holds the Roughriders franchise record for highest career field goal percentage. He is a Grey Cup champion after winning with the Roughriders in 2025 and was named a CFL West All-Star in 2018.

== Early life ==
Lauther attended the Cobequid Educational Centre in Truro, Nova Scotia where he played for the Cougars as a placekicker and wide receiver.

== University career ==
Lauther played CIS football at Saint Mary's University for the Huskies from 2009 to 2012. He played in 18 games over four years as the team's placekicker and punter where he was successful on 33 out of 47 field goal attempts and had 146 punts with a 38.4-yard average. He was a Loney Bowl champion with the Huskies in 2009 and 2010 and was named an AUS All-Star in 2011 and 2012.

== Professional career ==
=== Hamilton Tiger-Cats ===
Lauther was drafted by the Hamilton Tiger-Cats of the CFL with the 53rd overall pick in the 2013 CFL draft and was signed by the team on May 27, 2013. As a native Nova Scotian, he has the unusual distinction of playing in his first professional football game in the Maritimes, in Moncton, New Brunswick, as part of the third installment of Touchdown Atlantic. For this game, he was named Special Teams Player of the Week for Week Thirteen of the 2013 season after going 4 for 4 on field goal attempts on September 21, 2013, against the Montreal Alouettes. Lauther was re-signed by the Tiger-Cats on January 8, 2014, where he spent the entire season on the practice roster behind incumbent, Justin Medlock. He declined a contract from the Tiger-Cats during the following off-season.

=== Saskatchewan Roughriders (first stint) ===
Lauther signed a practice roster agreement with the CFL's Saskatchewan Roughriders on September 3, 2015. He was released on October 8, 2015.

=== Toronto Argonauts ===
On October 14, 2015, Lauther was added to the practice roster of the Toronto Argonauts of the CFL. He was released by the team on October 19, 2015.

=== Saskatchewan Roughriders (second stint) ===
On August 29, 2017, Lauther was signed to the practice roster of the Saskatchewan Roughriders. However, he was released on September 12, 2017.

=== Edmonton Eskimos ===
On September 25, 2017, Lauther was signed by the Edmonton Eskimos in response to Sean Whyte's injury. He spent the remainder of the 2017 season on the practice roster.

=== Saskatchewan Roughriders (third stint) ===
On March 19, 2018, Lauther signed with the Roughriders for a third time, but participated in training camp with the team for the first time. Lauther became the team's placekicker and enjoyed a successful 2018 CFL season that culminated in his first Divisional All-Star award. He led the league with 54 field goals from 60 attempts and also led the league in points with 198. He also had the longest successful field goal that year which was made from 56 yards out.

In the second game of the 2019 season, Lauther kicked a career-long 57-yard field against the Ottawa Redblacks on June 20, 2019, which was the fifth-longest in Roughriders history. After the third game, he was moved to the injured list as he battled through hip and groin injuries and missed five games between July and August. He returned on August 24, 2019, and played in the last 10 regular season games of the season. Entering the last regular season game of 2019, Lauther had an 85.7 percent field goal success rate, the final game against the Edmonton Eskimos which was a victory that clinched first place in the West Division. In the West Final, he successfully connected on all four field goal attempts, but the Roughriders lost to the Winnipeg Blue Bombers.

After the CFL canceled the 2020 season due to the COVID-19 pandemic, Lauther chose to opt-out of his contract with the Roughriders on August 25, 2020. He re-signed with the team on March 12, 2021. In 2021, he played in all 14 regular season games where he made 40 out of 47 field goal attempts. He notably recovered his own onside kick in a game against the Calgary Stampeders on October 2, 2021. Following an injury to the team's punter, Jon Ryan, Lauther was also pressed into punting duty for the first time in his professional career on October 23, 2021.

On January 29, 2022, it was announced that Lauther had signed a two-year contract extension with the Roughriders. On July 16, 2022, in Touchdown Atlantic, Lauther scored the first points in the first CFL regular season game played in Nova Scotia with a 34-yard field goal. He finished the season having played in 18 regular season games, making 41 of 50 field goal attempts. In 2023, he was successful on 36 of 44 field goal attempts.

In 2025, Lauther struggled with consistency as he completed 39 of 54 field goal attempts for a success rate of 72.2%, which was the lowest of his career for a full season. He finished at the bottom of the league that year in overall field goal percentage, success rate for field goals under 40 yards, success rate for field goals over 40 yards, and success rate for convert attempts. Lauther had a strong performance in the West Final where he was 3-for-3 on field goal attempts and made both convert attempts. In doing so, he became the all-time leader in playoff field goal percentage at 91.3% (21 of 23) in CFL history. Lauther made his Grey Cup debut in the 112th Grey Cup where he made a 48-yard field goal but also missed from 39 yards while connecting on all three convert attempts as the Roughriders defeated the Montreal Alouettes. In the following off-season, the Roughriders announced that they had released Lauther on February 2, 2026.

=== Ottawa Redblacks ===
On April 17, 2026, Lauther signed with the Ottawa Redblacks. He saw a resurgence of success as he played in 12 regular season games and connected on 32 of 34 field goal attempts (94.1%), including making all three attempts over 50 yards.

=== Saskatchewan Roughriders ===
On the day of the trade deadline, on September 30, 2026, Lauther was traded back to the Roughriders in exchange for a fifth-round pick in the 2027 CFL draft.
