= Paul Fedor (Canadian football) =

Canadian football player (1934-2023)

Profile
- Positions: Defensive end, wide receiver

Personal information
- Born: January 28, 1934; Niagara Falls, Ontario, Canada
- Died: July 2, 2023 (aged 89); Alexandria, Ontario, Canada
- Listed height: 6 ft 2 in (1.88 m)
- Listed weight: 196 lb (89 kg)

Career information
- College: Queen's University
- CFL draft: 1958: 1st round, 2nd overall pick

Career history
- 1958–1960: Toronto Argonauts
- 1961–1962: Montreal Alouettes

Awards and highlights
- University All-Star (1957)

Paul Fedor (January 28, 1934 - July 2, 2023) was a former university all-star and Canadian Football League defensive end.

Graduating from Queen's University, where he was an all-star in 1957, Fedor played for the Toronto Argonauts for 3 seasons, his best being 1960, when he caught 9 passes for 154 yards and 1 touchdown. In 1961 was traded to the Montreal Alouettes, along with Bobby Jack Oliver and linebacker Ron Brewer, for defensive end Doug McNichol and tackle Billy Shipp. He played two seasons with the Als.

After his retirement from football following a serious injury, Fedor returned to Queens University to receive his BPHE and then his BEd from the University of Toronto and worked as a teacher until he retired from teaching in 1985. Fedor died at the age of 89 years on July 2, 2023 from complications of Parkinson's disease.
