= Peter Kempf =

Canadian football player (born 1939)

Profile
- Positions: Kicker, slotback

Personal information
- Born: September 15, 1939 (age 87)
- Listed height: 6 ft 2 in (1.88 m)
- Listed weight: 210 lb (95 kg)

Career information
- College: Western State
- University: British Columbia

Career history
- 1963–1965: BC Lions
- 1966: Montreal Alouettes
- 1967–1968: Edmonton Eskimos

Awards and highlights
- Dr. Beattie Martin Trophy (1963); Grey Cup champion (1964)

Peter Kempf (born September 15, 1939) is a Canadian former professional football player and 52nd Grey Cup champion who played as a kicker and tight end in the Canadian Football League from 1963 to 1968.

Kempf joined the BC Lions in 1963 and, with 109 points and 22 field goals (second in the league and then team records,) was winner of the Dr. Beattie Martin Trophy for Canadian rookie of the year in the west. In 1964 he again was second in the league with 81 points, adding 4 converts in the Leos' Grey Cup victory. Again second in scoring in 1965 with 82 points, after 48 games with the Lions he left for the Montreal Alouettes in 1966, where he played 14 games and scored 67 points. He played his final 2 seasons with the Edmonton Eskimos, including 32 games and 163 points.

He retired after scoring 502 points, additionally catching 70 passes for 834 yards and 5 touchdowns, and 1 interception.
