= Bob Kraemer =

No. 10
- Position: Wide receiver

Personal information
- Born: May 31, 1950 (age 76)

Career information
- University: Manitoba

Career history
- 1971–1974: Winnipeg Blue Bombers

Awards and highlights
- Dr. Beattie Martin Trophy (1971)

Bob Kraemer (born May 31, 1950) is a former award-winning receiver who played in the Canadian Football League from 1971 to 1974.

Originally a receiver, Kraemer became quarterback of the University of Manitoba and was a member of the Bison's 1969 and 1970 national championship teams, being named MVP in the 1969 championship game. Kraemer joined the Winnipeg Blue Bombers in 1971 as a receiver and, with 39 receptions for 468 yards, was winner of the Dr. Beattie Martin Trophy for Canadian rookie of the year in the west. His best year was 1973, with 47 catches for 635 yards. He finished his career with 109 receptions for 1375 yards and 5 touchdowns, and as a (rare Canadian) quarterback, he completed 2 of 6 passes for 43 yards, both for touchdowns.

Kraemer was inducted into the Manitoba Sports Hall of Fame in 2017 as a multi-sport athlete, as he also excelled at baseball, handball, golf, and racquetball, as well as football.
