= Zeno Karcz =

Canadian football player (1935–2022)

Profile
- Position: Linebacker

Personal information
- Born: 16 May 1935; Toronto, Ontario, Canada
- Died: 31 August 2022 (aged 87)
- Listed height: 5 ft 11 in (1.80 m)
- Listed weight: 200 lb (91 kg)

Career history

Playing
- 1957–1966: Hamilton Tiger-Cats

Coaching
- 1967–1969: Windsor AKO Fratmen

Awards and highlights
- 3× Grey Cup champion (1957, 1962, 1965); CFL All-Star (1965); 2× CFL East All-Star (1962, 1965); Most Outstanding Canadian (1965)

Zeno Karcz (16 May 1935 – 31 August 2022) was a Canadian professional football linebacker in the Canadian Football League (CFL).

Having played his junior football with the Windsor AKO Fratmen, he went on to the Hamilton Tiger-Cats (from 1957 to 1966) in the CFL. He was an all star in 1962 and 1965, winning the CFL's Most Outstanding Canadian Award in 1965. He was a member of the 1957, 1963 and 1965 Grey Cup championship teams.

After retiring from professional football, he returned to the Windsor AKO Fratmen as head coach between 1967 and 1969.
