= John Pentecost (American football) =

American football player (born 1943)

No. 66
- Position: Guard

Personal information
- Born: December 23, 1943 (age 82); Lawndale, California U.S.
- Listed height: 6 ft 2 in (1.88 m)
- Listed weight: 251 lb (114 kg)

Career information
- High school: Orange
- College: UCLA
- NFL draft: 1965: undrafted

Career history
- Ottawa Rough Riders (1965); Winnipeg Blue Bombers (1966)*; Minnesota Vikings (1967); Atlanta Falcons (1968)*; Winnipeg Blue Bombers (1968–1969); Los Angeles Rams (1970)*
- * Offseason or practice squad member only
- Stats at Pro Football Reference

John Mathew Pentecost (December 23, 1943) is an American former professional football player who was a guard for the Minnesota Vikings of National Football League (NFL). He played college football for the UCLA.
