= Billy Cooper (Canadian football) =

Canadian football player (born 1945)

No. 23
- Positions: Wide receiver, defensive back

Personal information
- Born: January 1, 1945 (age 81); Winnipeg, Manitoba, Canada
- Died: August 1995; Ottawa ON

Career information
- College: none - Winnipeg Rods

Career history
- 1964–67: Winnipeg Blue Bombers
- 1968–73: Ottawa Rough Riders
- 1973: Edmonton Eskimos
- 1974: Toronto Argonauts

Awards and highlights
- 2× Grey Cup champion (1968, 1969); Dr. Beattie Martin Trophy (1964)

Billy Cooper is a former award-winning and Grey Cup champion wide receiver and defensive back who played in the Canadian Football League from 1964 to 1974.

Coming from the Winnipeg Rods junior team and joining the Blue Bombers in 1964, Cooper won the Dr. Beattie Martin Trophy for best Canadian rookie in the west on the strength of his 24 pass receptions for 409 yard and 4 touchdowns (he also rushed the ball, kicked off, and returned both kicks and punts.) After four seasons with the Winnipeg Blue Bombers he played 6 seasons with the Ottawa Rough Riders, winning 2 Grey Cups. He finished the 1973 with the Edmonton Eskimos and ended his football career in 1974 with the Toronto Argonauts.
