= Keith Pearce =

Canadian football player

Keith Gordon Pearce
Profile
- Positions: Halfback, End

Personal information
- Born: June 11, 1929; Winnipeg, Manitoba, Canada
- Died: February 28, 1997 (aged 67); British Columbia, Canada
- Listed height: 6 ft 2 in (1.88 m)
- Listed weight: 187 lb (85 kg)

Career history
- 1950–1958: Winnipeg Blue Bombers

Awards and highlights
- Grey Cup champion (1958)

Keith Pearce (June 11, 1929 – February 28, 1997) was a Canadian professional football player who played for the Winnipeg Blue Bombers. He won the Grey Cup in 1958. He previously played for the Winnipeg Rods.
