= Gene Gaines =

American gridiron football player (1938–2023)

No. 22
- Position: Defensive back

Personal information
- Born: June 26, 1938; Los Angeles, California, U.S.
- Died: July 6, 2023 (aged 85)
- Listed height: 5 ft 11 in (1.80 m)
- Listed weight: 185 lb (84 kg)

Career information
- High school: David Starr Jordan (CA)
- College: UCLA
- AFL draft: 1961: 21st round, 167th overall pick

Career history

Playing
- 1961: Montreal Alouettes
- 1962–1969: Ottawa Rough Riders
- 1970–1976: Montreal Alouettes

Coaching
- 1982: Edmonton Eskimos (DB Coach)
- 1986–1990: Winnipeg Blue Bombers (Secondary Coach)

Awards and highlights
- 8× Grey Cup champion - 1968, 1969, 1970, 1974 (player), 1970, 1974, 1977, 1982, 1990 (coaching staff); 3× CFL All-Star (1965, 1966, 1967); 5× CFL East All-Star (1963, 1965, 1966, 1967, 1971); Jeff Russel Memorial Trophy (1966)
- Canadian Football Hall of Fame (Class of 1994)

Eugene Carver Gaines (June 26, 1938 – July 6, 2023) was an American professional football player who was a defensive back for 16 years in the Canadian Football League (CFL). He played for the Ottawa Rough Riders and Montreal Alouettes. He is a member of the Canadian Football Hall of Fame.

Gaines was born in Los Angeles and grew up in the Watts neighborhood. He played college football for the UCLA Bruins. Gaines had 42 career interceptions in the CFL. With Ottawa in 1964, he set a CFL record with a 128-yard kickoff return in the Eastern Conference playoffs against the Hamilton Tiger-Cats. In 1970, he was both a player and one of the defensive backfield coaches for the Alouettes. Gaines played in the CFL as a non-import player based on a 1965 ruling allowing teams to designate certain long-term players as Canadian for football purposes.

Following his retirement as a player, he remained involved in coaching in the CFL, with Montreal (1977–81), Edmonton Eskimos (1982), Winnipeg Blue Bombers (1986–87, 1989–90), and Hamilton (1988). He also coached in the United States with the Los Angeles Express (USFL) in 1983, and in 1984–85 with the NFL Houston Oilers; on the American teams, he accompanied his Edmonton Coach Hugh Campbell, and at the end of the 1985 season was not renewed to the staff, and Campbell had been fired after 14 games.

Gaines died on July 6, 2023, at the age of 85.
