= Jim Chambers =

Canadian football player (1927–1997)

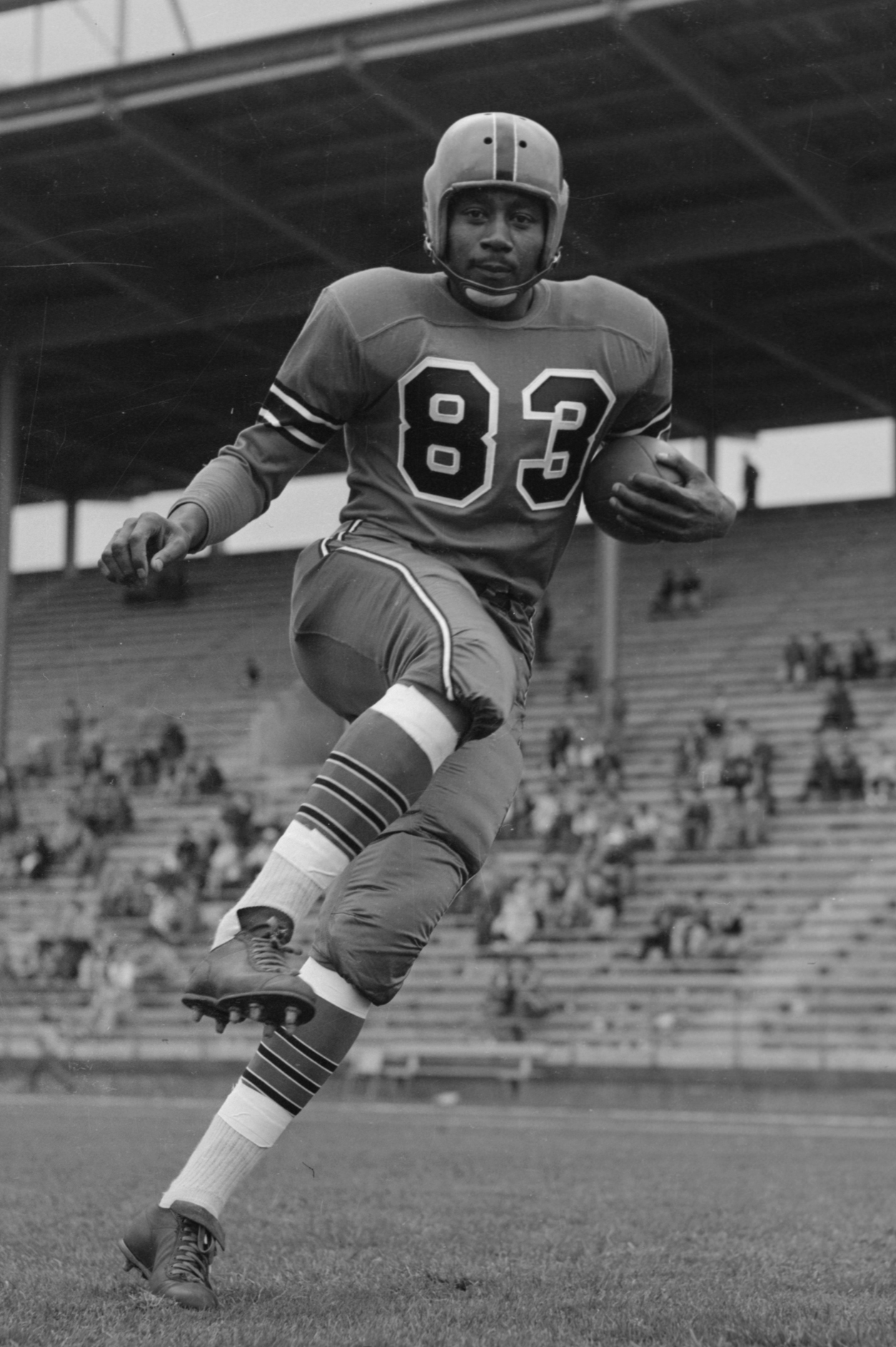
- Chambers in 1954

Profile
- Position: Halfback

Personal information
- Born: March 16, 1927; Montreal, Quebec, Canada
- Died: December 31, 1997 (aged 70); Toronto, Ontario, Canada
- Listed height: 6 ft 1 in (1.85 m)
- Listed weight: 197 lb (89 kg)

Career information
- College: none - Westmount Warriors

Career history
- 1951–1953: Edmonton Eskimos
- 1954: BC Lions

Awards and highlights
- Dr. Beattie Martin Trophy (1951)

Jim Chambers (March 16, 1927 – December 31, 1997) was a Canadian halfback who played in the Western Interprovincial Football Union.

A native of Montreal, and a graduate of the Westmount Warriors junior program, Chambers won the Dr. Beattie Martin Trophy for Canadian rookie of the year in the west by rushing for 513 yards and an amazing 9.9 yard average for the Edmonton Eskimos in 1951 (coupled with teammate and all-star Normie Kwong).

He played 3 seasons for the Eskimos, rushing for 921 yards and catching 38 passes, but when all-star Rollie Miles joined the team he saw little playing time. He finished his career with the 1954 inaugural BC Lions team, playing 5 games, rushing for 27 yards and catching 4 passes. He died on December 31, 1997, in Toronto, Ontario.
