= John Stroppa =

Canadian football player (1926–2017)

Profile
- Position: Defensive back

Personal information
- Born: January 2, 1926; Winnipeg, Manitoba, Canada
- Died: May 7, 2017 (aged 91); Edmonton, Alberta, Canada

Career history
- 1949–1951: Winnipeg Blue Bombers

Awards and highlights
- Dr. Beattie Martin Trophy (1949)

John Stroppa (January 2, 1926 – May 7, 2017) was a halfback who played in the Canadian Football League for the Winnipeg Blue Bombers from 1949 to 1951.

A native of Winnipeg, Stroppa took the league by storm in 1949, being the surprise winner of the Dr. Beattie Martin Trophy for Canadian rookie of the year in the west. He also played in the famed Mud Bowl, the 1950 Grey Cup but retired after a serious mid-season kidney injury in 1951.

After his playing days Stroppa moved to Edmonton because of his job, and took up amateur officiating. He then became one of the few professional players to become a CFL referee, working 250 games in 15 years, after which he became the CFL's supervisor of officials for another 11 years. He died in Edmonton on May 7, 2017.
