= Pat Claridge =

Canadian gridiron football player (1938–2012)

Profile
- Positions: Wide receiver, End

Personal information
- Born: July 12, 1938; Vancouver, British Columbia, Canada
- Died: March 8, 2012 (aged 73); Victoria, British Columbia, Canada
- Listed height: 6 ft 2 in (1.88 m)
- Listed weight: 210 lb (95 kg)

Career information
- Junior: Vancouver Blue Bombers
- College: Washington

Career history
- 1961–1966: BC Lions
- 1968: Calgary Stampeders

Awards and highlights
- Grey Cup champion (1964); Helms Foundation National Champion (1960); Second-team All-PCC (1960)

Patrick S. Claridge (July 12, 1938 – March 8, 2012) was a Canadian professional football player who played for the BC Lions and Calgary Stampeders.

== College career ==
Claridge lettered at Washington from 1958-60. He was leading receiver and Most Improved Player on the 1960 team, which went 10-1 while beat Minnesota in the Rose Bowl 17-7 and was awarded the national championship by the Helms Athletic Foundation.

== CFL career ==
He won the Grey Cup with the Lions in 1964. He played college football at the University of Washington with his brother Bruce, who also played in the CFL. He was later a businessman following his retirement from football. Claridge died of Alzheimer's disease in 2012.
