= Dick Fouts =

American gridiron football player (1933–2003)

Profile
- Position: Defensive end

Personal information
- Born: August 7, 1933; Omaha, Nebraska, U.S.
- Died: August 5, 2003 (aged 69); Monterey, California, U.S.
- Listed height: 6 ft 6 in (1.98 m)
- Listed weight: 245 lb (111 kg)

Career information
- College: Missouri
- NFL draft: 1956: 22nd round, 264th overall pick

Career history
- 1957–1961: Toronto Argonauts
- 1962–1966: BC Lions
- 1967: Toronto Argonauts
- 1968–1969: BC Lions

Awards and highlights
- Grey Cup champion (1964); DeMarco–Becket Memorial Trophy (1965); 3× CFL All-Star (1963, 1964, 1965); 2× CFL East All-Star (1958, 1960); 3× CFL West All-Star (1963, 1964, 1965)

Richard Lee Fouts (August 7, 1933 – August 5, 2003) was an American professional Canadian football player with the Canadian Football League (CFL)'s Toronto Argonauts and the BC Lions. After playing college football at the University of Missouri, where he was an All-American, Fouts spent his entire 13-year CFL career as a defensive lineman. He was named CFL All-Star three times in 1963, 1964 and 1965, and was a part of the Lions' Grey Cup victory in 1964.

In 1965, he was awarded the DeMarco–Becket Memorial Trophy and named the best lineman in the West Division of the Canadian Football League.
