= Lorne Benson =

Canadian football player (1930–2012)

Profile
- Position: Fullback

Personal information
- Born: September 16, 1930; Winnipeg, Manitoba, Canada
- Died: April 3, 2012 (aged 81); Innisfail, Alberta, Canada

Career information
- College: none - Weston Wildcats (Jr.)

Career history
- 1951–1955: Winnipeg Blue Bombers

Awards and highlights
- Dr. Beattie Martin Trophy (1952)

Lorne "Boom Boom" Benson (September 16, 1930 – April 3, 2012) was a fullback who played in the Canadian Football League for the Winnipeg Blue Bombers from 1951 to 1955.

Benson first played in 1951, but nonetheless won the Dr. Beattie Martin Trophy for Canadian rookie of the year in the west in 1952 on the strength of his 491 rushing yards. He rushed for a career-high 561 yards in 1953 and finished, after 5 years with the Blue Bombers, with 1671 rushing yards and 31 pass receptions, for 11 TDs.

He holds the CFL record for most points in a playoff game with 30 and most touchdowns in a playoff game with six. Both records were set on Oct. 28, 1953 against Saskatchewan.

Benson died April 3, 2012, at the age of 81.
