= Hal Waggoner =

American gridiron football player (1930–2004)

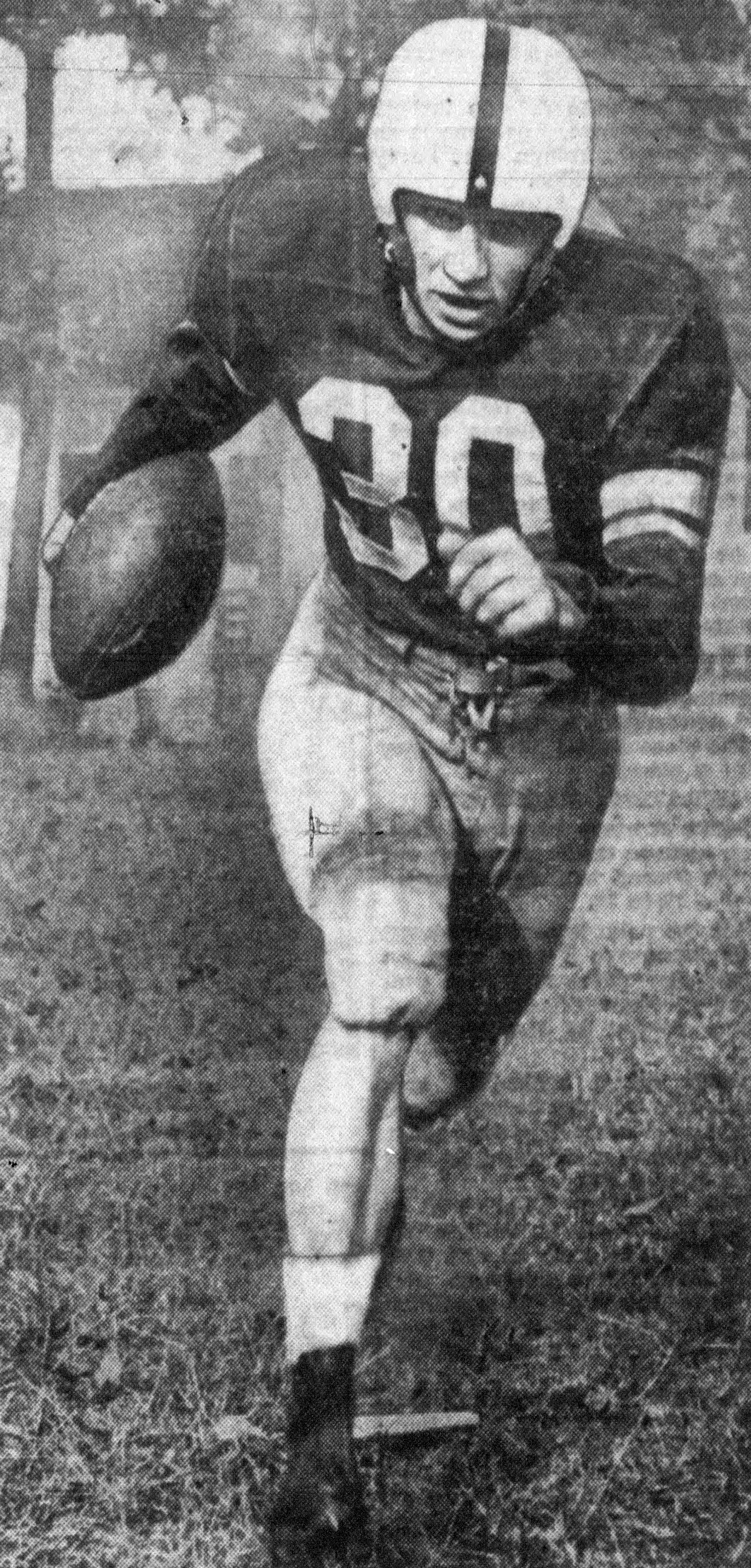
- Waggoner, circa 1949

Profile
- Positions: Halfback, Defensive back

Personal information
- Born: January 18, 1930; North Little Rock, Arkansas, U.S.
- Died: December 4, 2004 (aged 74); Fort Myers, Florida, U.S.
- Listed height: 5 ft 10 in (1.78 m)
- Listed weight: 170 lb (77 kg)

Career history
- 1951–1957: Hamilton Tiger-Cats
- 1960: Toronto Argonauts

Awards and highlights
- Grey Cup champion 1957; 2× CFL East All-Star (1951, 1952)

James Harold Waggoner (January 18, 1930 – December 4, 2004) was an American professional football player, all star and Grey Cup champion who played for the Hamilton Tiger-Cats. He won the Grey Cup with them in 1957. He also played two games for the Toronto Argonauts in 1960. He played college football at Tulane University. After his football career, he was a teacher in Florida. He died of complications during surgery in Fort Myers, Florida in 2004. His grandson Garrett Waggoner was an Ivy League all-star at Dartmouth College and played two seasons for the Winnipeg Blue Bombers.
