= Jim Furlong =

Canadian football player (1940–2026)

No. 70
- Positions: Linebacker, Punter

Personal information
- Born: March 24, 1940; Winnipeg, Manitoba, Canada
- Died: January 8, 2026 (aged 85)

Career information
- College: Tulsa

Career history
- 1962–1974: Calgary Stampeders

Awards and highlights
- Grey Cup champion (1971)

Jim Furlong (March 24, 1940 – January 8, 2026) was a Canadian professional football player who was an outside linebacker and punter for 13 seasons with the Calgary Stampeders of the Canadian Football League (CFL) from 1962 to 1974. He played college football in the United States for the Tulsa Golden Hurricane.

== Background ==
Furlong was born in Winnipeg, Manitoba, on March 24, 1940. He died on January 8, 2026, at the age of 85.

== College football ==
Furlong played college football at the University of Tulsa in Tulsa, Oklahoma.

== Calgary ==
Furlong played outside linebacker and punter for the Calgary Stampeders throughout his 13-year career from 1962 to 1974. He was a part of the Stampeders' 1971 Grey Cup championship team which defeated Toronto. Furlong was also a member of the team that played in the 56th Grey Cup of 1968 and the 58th Grey Cup of 1970, losing to the Ottawa Rough Riders and to the Montreal Alouettes.
