= Billy Shipp =

American gridiron football player (1929–2011)

No. 74, 69, 68, 66
- Position: Offensive tackle

Personal information
- Born: October 16, 1930; Mobile, Alabama, U.S.
- Died: June 9, 2011 (aged 80); Mobile, Alabama, U.S.
- Listed height: 6 ft 5 in (1.96 m)
- Listed weight: 275 lb (125 kg)

Career information
- High school: Murphy (Mobile)
- College: Alabama (1948–1949, 1952–1953)
- NFL draft: 1952: 8th round, 95th overall pick

Career history
- New York Giants (1954); Toronto Argonauts (1955-1956); Montreal Alouettes (1956-1960); Toronto Argonauts (1961–1965)

Awards and highlights
- 3× CFL East All-Star (1955, 1959, 1964)

Career NFL statistics
- Games played: 11
- Games started: 4
- Stats at Pro Football Reference

William Leonard Shipp (October 16, 1929 – June 9, 2011) was an American professional football player who played twelve seasons with the Canadian Football League (CFL)'s Montreal Alouettes and the Toronto Argonauts. During those years, he became an eastern conference all-star as an offensive tackle in 1955 and 1959 and as a defensive tackle in 1964. Shipp played all 14 regular season games every year from 1958 to 1962 except 1960 when he missed 5. As a defensive lineman, he intercepted a pass in 1961. He started his professional career in the NFL, playing one season for the New York Giants.
