= 1965 CFL season =

Canadian Football League season

- Duration: June – October, 1965
- East champions: Hamilton Tiger-Cats
- West champions: Winnipeg Blue Bombers

53rd Grey Cup
- Date: November 27, 1965
- Venue: Exhibition Stadium, Toronto
- Champions: Hamilton Tiger-Cats

CFL seasons
- 1964 1966

Canadian Football League team locations: West, East

The 1965 CFL season is considered to be the 12th season in modern-day Canadian football, although it is officially the eighth Canadian Football League season.

== CFL news in 1965 ==
The Canadian Football League commissioned an economic study of Canadian football and all its aspects. The Canadian Football League Players' Association was formed and had their first meetings on May 15 and 16 in Toronto.

== Regular season standings ==
West Division
| Pos | Team | Pld | W | L | T | PF | PA | PD | Pts |
|---|---|---|---|---|---|---|---|---|---|
| 1 | Calgary Stampeders (C, Q) | 16 | 12 | 4 | 0 | 340 | 243 | +97 | 24 |
| 2 | Winnipeg Blue Bombers (Q) | 16 | 11 | 5 | 0 | 301 | 262 | +39 | 22 |
| 3 | Saskatchewan Roughriders (Q) | 16 | 8 | 7 | 1 | 276 | 277 | −1 | 17 |
| 4 | BC Lions | 16 | 6 | 9 | 1 | 286 | 273 | +13 | 13 |
| 5 | Edmonton Eskimos | 16 | 5 | 11 | 0 | 257 | 400 | −143 | 10 |

(C) First round bye; (Q) Qualified for playoffs

East Division
| Pos | Team | Pld | W | L | T | PF | PA | PD | Pts |
|---|---|---|---|---|---|---|---|---|---|
| 1 | Hamilton Tiger-Cats (C, Q) | 14 | 10 | 4 | 0 | 281 | 153 | +128 | 20 |
| 2 | Ottawa Rough Riders (Q) | 14 | 7 | 7 | 0 | 300 | 234 | +66 | 14 |
| 3 | Montreal Alouettes (Q) | 14 | 5 | 9 | 0 | 183 | 215 | −32 | 10 |
| 4 | Toronto Argonauts | 14 | 3 | 11 | 0 | 193 | 360 | −167 | 6 |

(C) First round bye; (Q) Qualified for playoffs

Calgary and Hamilton have first round byes.

== Grey Cup playoffs ==
Note: All dates in 1965

=== Conference Semi-Finals ===
Eastern Semi-Finals
Montreal Alouettes @ Ottawa Rough Riders
| Date | Away | Home |
|---|---|---|
| November 6 | Montreal Alouettes 7 | Ottawa Rough Riders 36 |

- The Rough Riders will play the Hamilton Tiger-Cats in the Eastern Finals.

Western Semi-Finals
Saskatchewan Roughriders @ Winnipeg Blue Bombers
| Date | Away | Home |
|---|---|---|
| November 7 | Saskatchewan Roughriders 9 | Winnipeg Blue Bombers 15 |

- The Blue Bombers will play the Calgary Stampeders in the Western Finals.

=== Conference Finals ===
Western-Finals
Winnipeg Blue Bombers vs Calgary Stampeders
| Game | Date | Away | Home |
|---|---|---|---|
| 1 | November 13 | Winnipeg Blue Bombers 9 | Calgary Stampeders 27 |
| 2 | November 17 | Calgary Stampeders 11 | Winnipeg Blue Bombers 15 |
| 3 | November 20 | Winnipeg Blue Bombers 19 | Calgary Stampeders 12 |
Winnipeg wins the best of three series 2–1

Eastern Finals
Hamilton Tiger-Cats vs Ottawa Rough Riders
| Game | Date | Away | Home |
|---|---|---|---|
| 1 | November 14 | Hamilton Tiger-Cats 18 | Ottawa Rough Riders 13 |
| 2 | November 20 | Ottawa Rough Riders 7 | Hamilton Tiger-Cats 17 |
Hamilton won 2 game total-point series 35–20

== Playoff bracket ==
Division Semifinals
East
E2 | Ottawa Rough Riders | 36
E3 | Montreal Alouettes | 7
West
W2 | Winnipeg Blue Bombers | 15
W3 | Saskatchewan Roughriders | 9

Division Finals
E1 | Hamilton Tiger Cats | 35 (18+17)
E2 | Ottawa Rough Riders | 20 (13+7)
W1 | Calgary Stampeders | 1 (27,11,12)
W2 | Winnipeg Blue Bombers | 2 (9,15,19)

53rd Grey Cup
E1 | Hamilton Tiger Cats | 22
W2 | Winnipeg Blue Bombers | 16

=== Grey Cup Championship ===
November 27 53rd Annual Grey Cup Game: Exhibition Stadium – Toronto, Ontario
| Western Champion | Eastern Champion |
|---|---|
| Winnipeg Blue Bombers 16 | Hamilton Tiger-Cats 22 |
The Hamilton Tiger-Cats are the 1965 Grey Cup Champions

== CFL leaders ==
- CFL passing leaders
- CFL rushing leaders
- CFL receiving leaders

== 1965 CFL All-Stars ==
=== Offence ===
- QB – Ken Ploen, Winnipeg Blue Bombers
- RB – George Reed, Saskatchewan Roughriders
- RB – Bo Scott, Ottawa Rough Riders
- RB – Lovell Coleman, Calgary Stampeders
- TE – Tommy Joe Coffey, Edmonton Eskimos
- SE – Ted Watkins, Ottawa Rough Riders
- F – Hugh Campbell, Saskatchewan Roughriders
- C – Ted Urness, Saskatchewan Roughriders
- OG – Al Benecick, Saskatchewan Roughriders
- OG – Tony Pajaczkowski, Calgary Stampeders
- OT – Frank Rigney, Winnipeg Blue Bombers
- OT – Bronko Nagurski Jr., Hamilton Tiger-Cats

=== Defence ===
- DT – John Barrow, Hamilton Tiger-Cats
- DT – Pat Holmes, Calgary Stampeders
- DE – Billy Ray Locklin, Hamilton Tiger-Cats
- DE – Dick Fouts, BC Lions
- LB – Wayne Harris, Calgary Stampeders
- LB – Ken Lehmann, Ottawa Rough Riders
- LB – Zeno Karcz, Hamilton Tiger-Cats
- DB – Garney Henley, Hamilton Tiger-Cats
- DB – Billy Wayte, Hamilton Tiger-Cats
- DB – Dick Thornton, Winnipeg Blue Bombers
- DB – Jerry Keeling, Calgary Stampeders
- DB – Gene Gaines, Ottawa Rough Riders

== 1965 Eastern All-Stars ==
=== Offence ===
- QB – Bernie Faloney, Montreal Alouettes
- RB – Jim Dillard, Ottawa Rough Riders
- RB – Bo Scott, Ottawa Rough Riders
- RB – Dave Thelen, Toronto Argonauts
- TE – Stan Crisson, Hamilton Tiger-Cats
- SE – Ted Watkins, Ottawa Rough Riders
- F – Terry Evanshen, Montreal Alouettes
- C – Norm Stoneburgh, Toronto Argonauts
- OG – Chuck Walton, Hamilton Tiger-Cats
- OG – John Pentecost, Ottawa Rough Riders
- OT – Moe Racine, Ottawa Rough Riders
- OT – Bronko Nagurski Jr., Hamilton Tiger-Cats

=== Defence ===
- DT – John Barrow, Hamilton Tiger-Cats
- DT – Angelo Mosca, Hamilton Tiger-Cats
- DE – Billy Ray Locklin, Hamilton Tiger-Cats
- DE – John Baker, Montreal Alouettes
- LB – Ron Brewer, Toronto Argonauts
- LB – Ken Lehmann, Ottawa Rough Riders
- LB – Zeno Karcz, Hamilton Tiger-Cats
- DB – Garney Henley, Hamilton Tiger-Cats
- DB – Billy Wayte, Hamilton Tiger-Cats
- DB – Don Sutherin, Hamilton Tiger-Cats
- DB – Bob O'Billovich, Ottawa Rough Riders
- DB – Gene Gaines, Ottawa Rough Riders

== 1965 Western All-Stars ==
=== Offence ===
- QB – Ken Ploen, Winnipeg Blue Bombers
- RB – George Reed, Saskatchewan Roughriders
- RB – Dave Raimey, Winnipeg Blue Bombers
- RB – Lovell Coleman, Calgary Stampeders
- RB – Jim Thomas, Edmonton Eskimos
- TE – Tommy Joe Coffey, Edmonton Eskimos
- TE – Herm Harrison, Calgary Stampeders
- F – Hugh Campbell, Saskatchewan Roughriders
- C – Ted Urness, Saskatchewan Roughriders
- OG – Al Benecick, Saskatchewan Roughriders
- OG – Tony Pajaczkowski, Calgary Stampeders
- OT – Frank Rigney, Winnipeg Blue Bombers
- OT – Clyde Brock, Saskatchewan Roughriders

=== Defence ===
- DT – Mike Cacic, BC Lions
- DT – Pat Holmes, Calgary Stampeders
- DE – E.A. Sims, Edmonton Eskimos
- DE – Dick Fouts, BC Lions
- LB – Wayne Harris, Calgary Stampeders
- LB – Al Miller, Winnipeg Blue Bombers
- LB – Jim Furlong, Calgary Stampeders
- DB – Dale West, Saskatchewan Roughriders
- DB – Henry Janzen, Winnipeg Blue Bombers
- DB – Dick Thornton, Winnipeg Blue Bombers
- DB – Jerry Keeling, Calgary Stampeders
- DB – Larry Robinson, Calgary Stampeders

== 1965 CFL awards ==
- CFL's Most Outstanding Player Award – George Reed (RB), Saskatchewan Roughriders
- CFL's Most Outstanding Canadian Award – Zeno Karcz (LB), Hamilton Tiger-Cats
- CFL's Most Outstanding Lineman Award – Wayne Harris (LB), Calgary Stampeders
- CFL's Coach of the Year – Bud Grant, Winnipeg Blue Bombers
- Jeff Russel Memorial Trophy (Eastern MVP) – Bernie Faloney (QB), Montreal Alouettes
- Jeff Nicklin Memorial Trophy (Western MVP) - George Reed (RB), Saskatchewan Roughriders
- Gruen Trophy (Eastern Rookie of the Year) - Terry Evanshen (WR), Montreal Alouettes
- Dr. Beattie Martin Trophy (Western Rookie of the Year) - Ron Forwick (DE), Edmonton Eskimos
- DeMarco–Becket Memorial Trophy (Western Outstanding Lineman) - Dick Fouts (DE), BC Lions
