= Ted Watkins =

American gridiron football player (1941–1968)

Profile
- Position: Wide receiver

Personal information
- Born: April 6, 1941; Chicago
- Died: June 2, 1968 (aged 27); Stockton, California
- Listed height: 6 ft 3 in (1.91 m)
- Listed weight: 200 lb (91 kg)

Career information
- College: Pacific

Career history
- 1963–1966: Ottawa Rough Riders
- 1967: Hamilton Tiger-Cats

Awards and highlights
- Grey Cup champion (1967)

Ted Watkins (April 6, 1941 – June 2, 1968) was an American professional football player who left University of the Pacific in June 1963, prior to graduation, to sign with the Ottawa Rough Riders. During the course of his CFL career, he played for the Hamilton Tiger-Cats and Ottawa Rough Riders. He won the Grey Cup with Hamilton in 1967. He previously played college football at the University of the Pacific in Stockton, California.

In the late 1960s, Watkins was active in the Black Power movement in Toronto.

He was shot and killed in 1968 during an alleged liquor store holdup in Stockton, California, weeks before the beginning of the 1968 CFL season.

== See also ==
- List of gridiron football players who died during their careers
