= 1963 CFL season =

Canadian Football League season

- Duration: August – November 1963
- East champions: Hamilton Tiger-Cats
- West champions: BC Lions

51st Grey Cup
- Date: November 30, 1963
- Venue: Empire Stadium, Vancouver
- Champions: Hamilton Tiger-Cats

CFL seasons
- 1962 1964

Canadian Football League team locations: West, East

The 1963 CFL season is considered to be the tenth season in modern-day Canadian football, although it is officially the sixth Canadian Football League season.

== CFL news in 1963 ==
Charter Membership into the Canadian Football Hall of Fame started on June 19.

Average attendance exceeded 20,000 spectators per game for the first time in league history. The league has consistently drawn at least that number of fans to its games ever since.

== Regular season standings ==
West Division
Pos	Team	Pld	W	L	T	PF	PA	PD	Pts
1	BC Lions (C, Q)	16	12	4	0	387	232	+155	24
2	Calgary Stampeders (Q)	16	10	4	2	427	323	+104	22
3	Saskatchewan Roughriders (Q)	16	7	7	2	223	266	−43	16
4	Winnipeg Blue Bombers	16	7	9	0	302	325	−23	14
5	Edmonton Eskimos	16	2	14	0	220	425	−205	4

(C) First round bye; (Q) Qualified for playoffs

East Division
Pos	Team	Pld	W	L	T	PF	PA	PD	Pts
1	Hamilton Tiger-Cats (C, Q)	14	10	4	0	312	214	+98	20
2	Ottawa Rough Riders (Q)	14	9	5	0	326	284	+42	18
3	Montreal Alouettes (Q)	14	6	8	0	277	297	−20	12
4	Toronto Argonauts	14	3	11	0	202	310	−108	6

(C) First round bye; (Q) Qualified for playoffs

British Columbia and Hamilton have first round byes.

== Grey Cup playoffs ==
Note: All dates in 1963

=== Conference Semi-Finals ===
Western Semi-Finals
Saskatchewan Roughriders vs Calgary Stampeders
Game	Date	Away	Home
1	November 9	Saskatchewan Roughriders 9	Calgary Stampeders 35
2	November 11	Calgary Stampeders 12	Saskatchewan Roughriders 39
Saskatchewan won the total-point series 48–47

Eastern Semi-Finals
Montreal Alouettes @ Ottawa Rough Riders
Date	Away	Home
November 9	Montreal Alouettes 5	Ottawa Rough Riders 17

=== Conference Finals ===
Western-Finals
BC Lions vs Saskatchewan Roughriders
Game	Date	Away	Home
1	November 16	BC Lions 19	Saskatchewan Roughriders 7
2	November 20	Saskatchewan Roughriders 13	BC Lions 8
3	November 23	Saskatchewan Roughriders 1	BC Lions 36
BC wins the best of three series 2–1

Eastern Finals
Hamilton Tiger-Cats vs Ottawa Rough Riders
Game	Date	Away	Home
1	November 16	Hamilton Tiger-Cats 45	Ottawa Rough Riders 0
2	November 24	Ottawa Rough Riders 35	Hamilton Tiger-Cats 18
Hamilton won total-point series 63–35

== Playoff bracket ==
Division Semifinals
E2	Ottawa Rough Riders	17
E3	Montreal Alouettes	5

Division Finals
E1	Hamilton Tiger-Cats	63 (45+18)
E2	Ottawa Rough Riders	35 (0+35)
W1	BC Lions	2 (19,8,36)
W2	Saskatchewan Roughriders	1 (7,13,1)

51st Grey Cup
E1	Hamilton Tiger-Cats	21
W1	BC Lions	10

=== Grey Cup Championship ===
November 30 51st Annual Grey Cup Game: Empire Stadium – Vancouver, British Columbia
Western Champion	Eastern Champion
BC Lions 10	Hamilton Tiger-Cats 21
The Hamilton Tiger-Cats are the 1963 Grey Cup Champions

== CFL leaders ==
- CFL passing leaders
- CFL rushing leaders
- CFL receiving leaders

== 1963 CFL All-Stars ==
=== Offence ===
- QB – Joe Kapp, BC Lions
- RB – Dick Shatto, Toronto Argonauts
- RB – Willie Fleming, BC Lions
- RB – George Dixon, Montreal Alouettes
- RB – Lovell Coleman, Calgary Stampeders
- SE – Hal Patterson, Hamilton Tiger-Cats
- TE – Pete Manning, Calgary Stampeders
- C – Milt Crain, Montreal Alouettes
- OG – Tony Pajaczkowski, Calgary Stampeders
- OG – Tom Hinton, BC Lions
- OT – Roger Kramer, Ottawa Rough Riders
- OT – Lonnie Dennis, BC Lions

=== Defence ===
- DT – Don Luzzi, Calgary Stampeders
- DT – Angelo Mosca, Hamilton Tiger-Cats
- DE – Garner Ekstran, Saskatchewan Roughriders
- DE – Dick Fouts, BC Lions
- MG – John Barrow, Hamilton Tiger-Cats
- LB – Tom Brown, BC Lions
- LB – Jim Andreotti, Montreal Alouettes
- LB – Jim Conroy, Ottawa Rough Riders
- LB – Norm Fieldgate, BC Lions
- DB – Garney Henley, Hamilton Tiger-Cats
- DB – Harvey Wylie, Calgary Stampeders
- DB – Dick Thornton, Winnipeg Blue Bombers

== 1963 Eastern All-Stars ==
=== Offence ===
- QB – Russ Jackson, Ottawa Rough Riders
- RB – Dick Shatto, Toronto Argonauts
- RB – Dave Thelen, Ottawa Rough Riders
- RB – George Dixon, Montreal Alouettes
- F – Tommy Grant, Hamilton Tiger-Cats
- SE – Hal Patterson, Hamilton Tiger-Cats
- TE – Ted Watkins, Ottawa Rough Riders
- C – Milt Crain, Montreal Alouettes
- OG – Chuck Walton, Montreal Alouettes
- OG – Ellison Kelly, Hamilton Tiger-Cats
- OT – Roger Kramer, Ottawa Rough Riders
- OT – Hardiman Cureton, Hamilton Tiger-Cats

=== Defence ===
- DT – Ed Nickla, Montreal Alouettes
- DT – Angelo Mosca, Hamilton Tiger-Cats
- DE – Billy Joe Booth, Ottawa Rough Riders
- DE – John Autry, Toronto Argonauts
- MG – John Barrow, Hamilton Tiger-Cats
- LB – Jim Reynolds, Montreal Alouettes
- LB – Jim Andreotti, Montreal Alouettes
- LB – Jim Conroy, Ottawa Rough Riders
- LB – Gene Gaines, Ottawa Rough Riders
- DB – Garney Henley, Hamilton Tiger-Cats
- DB – Joe Poirier, Ottawa Rough Riders
- DB – Jim Rountree, Toronto Argonauts

== 1963 Western All-Stars ==
=== Offence ===
- QB – Joe Kapp, BC Lions
- RB – Nub Beamer, BC Lions
- RB – Willie Fleming, BC Lions
- RB – Jim Dillard, Calgary Stampeders
- RB – Lovell Coleman, Calgary Stampeders
- SE – Farrell Funston, Winnipeg Blue Bombers
- TE – Pete Manning, Calgary Stampeders
- C – Neil Habig, Saskatchewan Roughriders
- OG – Tony Pajaczkowski, Calgary Stampeders
- OG – Tom Hinton, BC Lions
- OT – Al Benecick, Saskatchewan Roughriders
- OT – Lonnie Dennis, BC Lions

=== Defence ===
- DT – Don Luzzi, Calgary Stampeders
- DT – Bill Clarke, Saskatchewan Roughriders
- DE – Garner Ekstran, Saskatchewan Roughriders
- DE – Dick Fouts, BC Lions
- MG – Ron Atchison, Saskatchewan Roughriders
- LB – Tom Brown, BC Lions
- LB – Wayne Harris, Calgary Stampeders
- LB – Wayne Shaw, Saskatchewan Roughriders
- LB – Norm Fieldgate, BC Lions
- DB – Dale West, Saskatchewan Roughriders
- DB – Dick Thornton, Winnipeg Blue Bombers
- S – Harvey Wylie, Calgary Stampeders

== 1963 CFL awards ==
- CFL's Most Outstanding Player Award – Russ Jackson (QB), Ottawa Rough Riders
- CFL's Most Outstanding Canadian Award – Russ Jackson (QB), Ottawa Rough Riders
- CFL's Most Outstanding Lineman Award – Tom Brown (LB), BC Lions
- CFL's Coach of the Year – Dave Skrien, BC Lions
- Jeff Russel Memorial Trophy (Eastern MVP) – Garney Henley (DB), Hamilton Tiger-Cats
- Jeff Nicklin Memorial Trophy (Western MVP) - Joe Kapp (QB), BC Lions
- Gruen Trophy (Eastern Rookie of the Year) - Rick Black (P/FB), Ottawa Rough Riders
- Dr. Beattie Martin Trophy (Western Rookie of the Year) - Peter Kempf (FB/K), BC Lions
- DeMarco–Becket Memorial Trophy (Western Outstanding Lineman) - Tom Brown (LB), BC Lions
