= 1964 CFL season =

Canadian Football League season

- Duration: June – October, 1964
- East champions: Hamilton Tiger-Cats
- West champions: BC Lions

52nd Grey Cup
- Date: November 28, 1964
- Venue: Exhibition Stadium, Toronto
- Champions: BC Lions

CFL seasons
- 1963 1965

Canadian Football League team locations: West, East

The 1964 CFL season is considered to be the 11th season in modern-day Canadian football, although it is officially the seventh Canadian Football League season.

== Regular season standings ==
West Division
Pos	Team	Pld	W	L	T	PF	PA	PD	Pts
1	BC Lions (C, Q)	16	11	2	3	328	168	+160	25
2	Calgary Stampeders (Q)	16	12	4	0	352	349	+3	24
3	Saskatchewan Roughriders (Q)	16	9	7	0	330	282	+48	18
4	Edmonton Eskimos	16	4	12	0	222	458	−236	8
5	Winnipeg Blue Bombers	16	1	14	1	270	397	−127	3

(C) First round bye; (Q) Qualified for playoffs

East Division
Pos	Team	Pld	W	L	T	PF	PA	PD	Pts
1	Hamilton Tiger-Cats (C, Q)	14	10	3	1	329	201	+128	21
2	Ottawa Rough Riders (Q)	14	8	5	1	313	228	+85	17
3	Montreal Alouettes (Q)	14	6	8	0	192	264	−72	12
4	Toronto Argonauts	14	4	10	0	243	332	−89	8

(C) First round bye; (Q) Qualified for playoffs

BC and Hamilton have first round byes.

== Grey Cup playoffs ==
Note: All dates in 1964

=== Conference Semi-Finals ===
Western Semi-Finals
Calgary Stampeders vs Saskatchewan Roughriders
Game	Date	Away	Home
1	November 7	Calgary Stampeders 25	Saskatchewan Roughriders 34
2	November 9	Saskatchewan Roughriders 6	Calgary Stampeders 51
Calgary won the total-point series by 76–40

Eastern Semi-Finals
Montreal Alouettes @ Ottawa Rough Riders
Date	Away	Home
November 7	Montreal Alouettes 0	Ottawa Rough Riders 27

=== Conference Finals ===
Western Finals
BC Lions vs Calgary Stampeders
Game	Date	Away	Home
1	November 14	BC Lions 24	Calgary Stampeders 10
2	November 18	Calgary Stampeders 14	BC Lions 10
3	November 22	Calgary Stampeders 14	BC Lions 33
BC wins the best of three series 2–1

Eastern Finals
Hamilton Tiger-Cats vs Ottawa Rough Riders
Game	Date	Away	Home
1	November 14	Hamilton Tiger-Cats 13	Ottawa Rough Riders 30
2	November 21	Ottawa Rough Riders 8	Hamilton Tiger-Cats 26
Hamilton won 2 game total-point series 39–38

== Playoff bracket ==
Division Semifinals
1
8
East
E2	Ottawa Rough Riders	27
E3	Montreal Alouettes	0
2
7
West
W2	Calgary Stampeders	76 (25+51)
W3	Saskatchewan Roughriders	40 (34+6)

Division Finals
E1	Hamilton Tiger-Cats	39 (13+26)
E2	Ottawa Rough Riders	38 (30+8)
W1	BC Lions	2 (24,10,33)
W2	Calgary Stampeders	1 (10,14,14)

52nd Grey Cup
E1	Hamilton Tiger-Cats	24
W1	BC Lions	34

=== Grey Cup Championship ===
November 28 52nd Annual Grey Cup Game: Exhibition Stadium – Toronto, Ontario
Western Champion	Eastern Champion
BC Lions 34	Hamilton Tiger-Cats 24
The BC Lions are the 1964 Grey Cup Champions

== CFL leaders ==
- CFL passing leaders
- CFL rushing leaders
- CFL receiving leaders

== 1964 CFL All-Stars ==
=== Offence ===
- QB – Joe Kapp, BC Lions
- RB – Lovell Coleman, Calgary Stampeders
- RB – Dick Shatto, Toronto Argonauts
- RB – Ed Buchanan, Saskatchewan Roughriders
- TE – Tommy Joe Coffey, Edmonton Eskimos
- TE – Hal Patterson, Hamilton Tiger-Cats
- F – Tommy Grant, Hamilton Tiger-Cats
- C – Chet Miksza, Hamilton Tiger-Cats
- OG – Tony Pajaczkowski, Calgary Stampeders
- OG – Ellison Kelly, Hamilton Tiger-Cats
- OG – Al Benecick, Saskatchewan Roughriders
- OT – Roger Kramer, Ottawa Rough Riders
- OT – Lonnie Dennis, BC Lions

=== Defence ===
- DT – John Barrow, Hamilton Tiger-Cats
- DT – Mike Cacic, BC Lions
- DE – Dick Fouts, BC Lions
- DE – Peter Neumann, Hamilton Tiger-Cats
- MG – Tom Brown, BC Lions
- LB – Wayne Harris, Calgary Stampeders
- LB – Ron Brewer, Toronto Argonauts
- LB – Bobby Kuntz, Hamilton Tiger-Cats
- DB – Garney Henley, Hamilton Tiger-Cats
- DB – Don Sutherin, Hamilton Tiger-Cats
- DB – Bill Munsey, BC Lions
- DB – Jerry Keeling, Calgary Stampeders
- DB – Bob Ptacek, Saskatchewan Roughriders

== 1964 Eastern All-Stars ==
=== Offence ===
- QB – Bernie Faloney, Hamilton Tiger-Cats
- RB – Ron Stewart, Ottawa Rough Riders
- RB – Dick Shatto, Toronto Argonauts
- RB – Dave Thelen, Ottawa Rough Riders
- E – Ted Watkins, Ottawa Rough Riders
- E – Hal Patterson, Hamilton Tiger-Cats
- F – Tommy Grant, Hamilton Tiger-Cats
- C – Chet Miksza, Hamilton Tiger-Cats
- OG – Ed Harrington, Toronto Argonauts
- OG – Ellison Kelly, Hamilton Tiger-Cats
- OT – Roger Kramer, Ottawa Rough Riders
- OT – Bronko Nagurski Jr., Hamilton Tiger-Cats

=== Defence ===
- DT – Ted Elsby, Montreal Alouettes
- DT – Billy Shipp, Toronto Argonauts
- DE – Billy Joe Booth, Ottawa Rough Riders
- DE – Peter Neumann, Hamilton Tiger-Cats
- MG – John Barrow, Hamilton Tiger-Cats
- LB – Ron Brewer, Toronto Argonauts
- LB – Bobby Kuntz, Hamilton Tiger-Cats
- DB – Garney Henley, Hamilton Tiger-Cats
- DB – Don Sutherin, Hamilton Tiger-Cats
- DB – Ed Learn, Montreal Alouettes
- DB – Jim Rountree, Toronto Argonauts
- DB – Joe Poirier, Ottawa Rough Riders

== 1964 Western All-Stars ==
=== Offence ===
- QB – Joe Kapp, BC Lions
- RB – Lovell Coleman, Calgary Stampeders
- RB – Leo Lewis, Winnipeg Blue Bombers
- RB – Ed Buchanan, Saskatchewan Roughriders
- E – Tommy Joe Coffey, Edmonton Eskimos
- E – Pete Manning, Calgary Stampeders
- E – Pat Claridge, BC Lions
- F – Hugh Campbell, Saskatchewan Roughriders
- C – Neil Habig, Saskatchewan Roughriders
- OG – Al Benecick, Saskatchewan Roughriders
- OG – Tom Hinton, BC Lions
- OT – Frank Rigney, Winnipeg Blue Bombers
- OT – Lonnie Dennis, BC Lions

=== Defence ===
- DT – Ron Atchison, Saskatchewan Roughriders
- DT – Mike Cacic, BC Lions
- DE – Dick Fouts, BC Lions
- DE – Bill Whisler, Winnipeg Blue Bombers
- MG – Tom Brown, BC Lions
- LB – Wayne Harris, Calgary Stampeders
- LB – Wayne Shaw, Saskatchewan Roughriders
- DB – Dale West, Saskatchewan Roughriders
- DB – Neal Beaumont, BC Lions
- DB – Bill Munsey, BC Lions
- DB – Jerry Keeling, Calgary Stampeders
- DB – Bob Ptacek, Saskatchewan Roughriders

== 1964 CFL awards ==
- CFL's Most Outstanding Player Award – Lovell Coleman (RB), Calgary Stampeders
- CFL's Most Outstanding Canadian Award – Tommy Grant (F), Hamilton Tiger-Cats
- CFL's Most Outstanding Lineman Award – Tom Brown (LB), BC Lions
- CFL's Coach of the Year – Ralph Sazio, Hamilton Tiger-Cats
- Jeff Russel Memorial Trophy (Eastern MVP) – Dick Shatto (RB), Toronto Argonauts
- Jeff Nicklin Memorial Trophy (Western MVP) - Tom Brown (LB), BC Lions
- Gruen Trophy (Eastern Rookie of the Year) - Al Irwin (WR), Montreal Alouettes
- Dr. Beattie Martin Trophy (Western Rookie of the Year) - Billy Cooper (WR), Winnipeg Blue Bombers
- DeMarco–Becket Memorial Trophy (Western Outstanding Lineman) - Tom Brown (MG), BC Lions
