= Ottawa Rough Riders all-time records and statistics =

The following is a list of Ottawa Rough Riders all-time records and statistics over their existence from 1876 to 1996.

== Games played ==
Most games played

- 201 – Moe Racine (1958–74)
- 186 – Gerry Organ (1971–77, 79–83)
- 169 – Bob Simpson (1950–62)
- 167 – Ron Stewart (1958–70)
- 166 – Russ Jackson (1958–69)

Most seasons played

- 22 – Eddie Emerson (1912–15, 19–35, 37)
- 17 – Moe Racine (1958–74)
- 14 – Joe Tubman (1913–15, 19–29)
- 13 – Charlie Connell (1920–32)
- 13 – Bob Simpson (1950–62)
- 13 – Ron Stewart (1958–70)

== Scoring ==
Most points – career

- 1,462 – Gerry Organ (1971–77, 79–83)
- 841 – Dean Dorsey (1984–87, 89–90)
- 772 – Terry Baker (1990–95)
- 402 – Ron Stewart (1958–70)
- 392 – Moe Racine (1958–74)

Most points – season

- 202 – Terry Baker – 1991
- 184 – Terry Baker – 1992
- 178 – Terry Baker – 1994
- 176 – Dean Dorsey – 1990
- 148 – Dean Dorsey – 1989

Most points – game

- 24 – Dave Thelen – versus Toronto Argonauts, September 16, 1959
- 24 – Ron Stewart – at Montreal Alouettes, October 10, 1960
- 24 – Art Green – versus Hamilton Tiger-Cats, September 7, 1975
- 24 – Dean Dorsey – versus Saskatchewan Roughriders, September 24, 1989

Most touchdowns – career

- 70 – Bob Simpson (1950–62)
- 67 – Ron Stewart (1958–70)
- 59 – Tony Gabriel (1975–81)
- 55 – Russ Jackson (1958–69)
- 54 – Whit Tucker (1962–70)

Most touchdowns – season

- 18 – Alvin Walker – 1982
- 16 – Ron Stewart – 1960
- 15 – Art Green – 1976
- 14 – Vic Washington – 1969
- 14 – Art Green – 1975
- 14 – Tony Gabriel – 1976

Most touchdowns – game

- 4 – Ken Charlton – versus Hamilton Tigers, November 9, 1946
- 4 – Dave Thelen – versus Toronto Argonauts, September 16, 1959
- 4 – Ron Stewart – at Montreal Alouettes, October 10, 1960
- 4 – Art Green – versus Hamilton Tiger-Cats, September 7, 1975

Most receiving touchdowns – career

- 65 – Bob Simpson (1950–62)
- 61 – Tony Gabriel (1975–81)
- 54 – Whit Tucker (1962–70)
- 34 – Stephen Jones (1990–94)
- 33 – Hugh Oldham (1970–74)

Most receiving touchdowns – season

- 14 – Tony Gabriel – 1976
- 13 – Whit Tucker – 1968
- 13 – Hugh Oldham – 1970
- 12 – David Williams – 1990
- 11 – Tony Gabriel – 1978
- 11 – Stephen Jones – 1990
- 11 – Jock Climie – 1993

Most receiving touchdowns – game

- 3 – Many

Most rushing touchdowns – career

- 54 – Russ Jackson (1958–69)
- 43 – Ron Stewart (1958–70)
- 39 – Dave Thelen (1958–64)
- 32 – Art Green (1973–76, 78)
- 24 – Alvin Walker (1982–84)

Most rushing touchdowns – season

- 15 – Ron Stewart – 1960
- 13 – Art Green – 1976
- 13 – Alvin Walker – 1982
- 11 – Art Green – 1975
- 10 – Alvin Walker – 1983
- 10 – Reggie Barnes – 1991

== Passing ==
Most passing yards – career

- 24,593 – Russ Jackson (1958–69)
- 11,251 – Damon Allen (1989–91)
- 10,937 – J. C. Watts (1981–86)
- 10,288 – Tom Burgess (1986, 1992–93)
- 9,663 – Tom Clements (1975–78)

Most passing yards – season

- 5,063 – Tom Burgess – 1993
- 4,275 – Damon Allen – 1991
- 4,173 – Danny Barrett – 1994
- 4,026 – Tom Burgess – 1992
- 3,977 – David Archer – 1996

Most passing yards – game

- 471 – Chris Isaac – versus Montreal Concordes, July 29, 1982
- 467 – David Archer – versus BC Lions, July 12, 1996
- 448 – Sammy Garza – versus Birmingham Barracudas, September 1, 1995

Most pass completions – career

- 1,356 – Russ Jackson (1958–69)
- 767 – Damon Allen (1989–91)
- 743 – J. C. Watts (1981–86)
- 700 – Tom Burgess (1986, 1992–93)
- 677 – Tom Clements (1975–78)

Most pass completions – season

- 329 – Tom Burgess – 1993
- 299 – Danny Barrett – 1994
- 294 – David Archer – 1996
- 282 – Damon Allen – 1991
- 276 – Tom Burgess – 1992

Most pass completions – game

- 30 – Tom Burgess – versus Hamilton Tiger-Cats, July 16, 1993
- 30 – David Archer – versus Hamilton Tiger-Cats, July 28, 1996

Most passing touchdowns – career

- 185 – Russ Jackson (1958–69)
- 75 – Damon Allen (1989–91)
- 66 – Tom Clements (1975–78)
- 64 – Tom Burgess (1986, 1992–93)
- 56 – Condredge Holloway (1975–80)

Most passing touchdowns – season

- 34 – Damon Allen – 1990
- 33 – Russ Jackson – 1969
- 30 – Tom Burgess – 1993
- 29 – Tom Burgess – 1992
- 25 – Russ Jackson – 1967
- 25 – Russ Jackson – 1968

Most passing touchdowns – game

- 5 – Chris Isaac – versus Montreal Concordes, July 29, 1982
- 5 – Damon Allen – versus Edmonton Eskimos, July 26, 1990
- 5 – Tom Burgess – versus Toronto Argonauts, July 9, 1992

== Rushing ==
Most rushing yards – career

- 6,917 – Dave Thelen (1958–64)
- 5,689 – Ron Stewart (1958–70)
- 5,045 – Russ Jackson (1958–69)
- 4,001 – Reggie Barnes (1990–93, 96)
- 3,586 – Art Green (1973–76, 78)

Most rushing yards – season (all 1,000 yard rushers included)

- 1,486 – Reggie Barnes – 1991
- 1,431 – Alvin Walker – 1983
- 1,407 – Dave Thelen – 1960
- 1,339 – Dave Thelen – 1959
- 1,260 – Reggie Barnes – 1990
- 1,257 – Art Green – 1976
- 1,188 – Art Green – 1975
- 1,141 – Alvin Walker – 1982
- 1,075 – Orville Lee – 1988
- 1,074 – Richard Crump – 1980
- 1,036 – Damon Allen – 1991
- 1,032 – Dave Thelen – 1961
- 1,020 – Ron Stewart – 1960
- 1,016 – Richard Holmes – 1977*

NOTE - In 1977 Richard Holmes played with Toronto and rushed for 151 years with that team.

Most rushing yards – game

- 287 – Ron Stewart – at Montreal Alouettes, October 10, 1960
- 213 – Tim McCray – versus Edmonton Eskimos, September 21, 1984
- 209 – Dave Thelen – versus Toronto Argonauts, September 14, 1960
- 203 – Alvin Walker – versus Calgary Stampeders, October 23, 1982

Most rushing attempts – career

- 1,211 – Dave Thelen (1958–64)
- 983 – Ron Stewart (1958–70)
- 777 – Reggie Barnes (1990–93, 96)
- 745 – Art Green (1973–76, 78)
- 726 – Russ Jackson (1958–69)

Most rushing attempts – season

- 291 – Reggie Barnes – 1991
- 258 – Art Green – 1975
- 245 – Dave Thelen – 1960
- 238 – Alvin Walker – 1983
- 234 – Art Green – 1976

Most rushing attempts – game

- 33 – Dave Thelen – versus Toronto Argonauts, September 14, 1960
- 30 – Tim McCray – versus Edmonton Eskimos, September 21, 1984
- 27 – Alvin Walker – versus Calgary Stampeders, October 23, 1982

Longest rush

- 87 – Bo Scott – at Montreal Alouettes, August 26, 1965
- 85 – Vic Washington – versus BC Lions, August 13, 1969
- 81 – Tim McCray – versus Edmonton Eskimos, September 21, 1984

== Receiving ==
Most receiving yards – career

- 7,484 – Tony Gabriel (1975–81)
- 6,092 – Whit Tucker (1962–70)
- 6,034 – Bob Simpson (1950–62)
- 5,108 – Stephen Jones (1990–94)
- 3,807 – Gerald Alphin (1987–89)

Most receiving yards – season

- 1,471 – Gerald Alphin – 1989
- 1,402 – Margene Adkins – 1969
- 1,400 – Stephen Jones – 1992
- 1,362 – Tony Gabriel – 1977
- 1,320 – Tony Gabriel – 1976

Most receiving yards – game

- 258 – Bob Simpson – versus Toronto Argonauts, September 29, 1956
- 254 – Stephen Jones – versus Toronto Argonauts, July 9, 1992
- 231 – Margene Adkins – versus Toronto Argonauts, October 15, 1969

Most receptions – career

- 444 – Tony Gabriel (1975–81)
- 278 – Stephen Jones (1990–94)
- 274 – Bob Simpson (1950–62)
- 272 – Whit Tucker (1962–70)
- 202 – Jock Climie (1991–94)

Most receptions – season

- 94 – Marc Lewis – 1987
- 79 – Joe Rogers – 1996
- 75 – Stephen Jones – 1992
- 74 – Stephen Jones – 1993
- 73 – Tony Gabriel – 1981

Most receptions – game

- 13 – Marc Barousse – at Hamilton Tiger-Cats, July 3, 1986
- 11 – Tony Gabriel – versus Montreal Alouettes, August 16, 1976
- 11 – Robert Gordon – at BC Lions, November 2, 1996

== Interceptions ==
Most interceptions – career

- 46 – Joe Poirier (1959–70)
- 37 – Al Marcelin (1970–75)
- 32 – Jerry Campbell (1968–75)
- 31 – Rod Woodward (1971–76)

Most interceptions – season

- 11 – Less Browne – 1992
- 10 – Don Sutherin – 1969
- 10 – Mike Nelms – 1979
- 10 – Troy Wilson – 1988
- 9 – Al Marcelin – 1970

Most interceptions – game

- 4 – Chris Sigler – versus Montreal Alouettes, June 27, 1986

Most interception return yards – career

- 658 – Joe Poirier (1959–70)
- 543 – Rod Woodward (1971–76)

Most interception return yards – season

- 259 – Less Browne – 1992
- 236 – Barry Ardern – 1969

Most interception return yards – game

- 172 – Barry Ardern – at Hamilton Tiger-Cats, November 1, 1969

== Tackles ==
- Note: Tackles were first recorded in 1987, but there was no differentiation between defensive and special teams tackles. Those categorical differences were added in 1991.

Most total tackles – season

- 127 – Bruce Holmes – 1990

Most defensive tackles – season

- 83 – Remi Trudel – 1995
- 76 – Brett Young – 1995
- 68 – Brian Bonner – 1991
- 68 – DeWayne Knight – 1996
- 64 – Scott Flagel – 1991

Most defensive tackles – game

- 14 – Bruce Holmes – at Edmonton Eskimos, October 15, 1989

Most special team tackles – career

- 42 – Dean Noel (1993–94)
- 38 – Joe Sardo (1992–94)
- 36 – Sean Foudy (1989–92)
- 35 – Mike Graybill (1993–94)

Most special team tackles – season

- 30 – Dean Noel – 1994
- 27 – Daniel Hunter – 1991
- 26 – Gord Weber – 1992
- 24 – Ron Goetz – 1993
- 24 – Stefen Reid – 1995

== Quarterback sacks (since 1981) ==
Most sacks – career

- 71 – Greg Marshall (1981–87)
- 57 – Loyd Lewis (1985–91, 95–96)
- 41 – Gregg Stumon (1990–93)
- 39 – Angelo Snipes (1991–93)
- 22 – Gary Dulin (1982–84)

Most sacks – season

- 20 – Angelo Snipes – 1992
- 16.5 – Greg Marshall – 1984
- 15.5 – Greg Marshall – 1983
- 15 – Loyd Lewis – 1986
- 14 – Angelo Snipes – 1993
