= 54th Grey Cup =

1966 Canadian Football championship game

Saskatchewan Roughriders	Ottawa Rough Riders
(9–6–1)	(11–3)
29	14
Head coach: Eagle Keys	Head coach: Frank Clair
	1	2	3	4	Total
Saskatchewan Roughriders	7	7	0	15	29
Ottawa Rough Riders	6	8	0	0	14
- Date: November 26, 1966
- Stadium: Empire Stadium
- Location: Vancouver
- Referee: Al Dryburgh
- Attendance: 36,553

Broadcasters
- Network: CBC, CTV, SRC

The 54th Grey Cup was hosted at Empire Stadium in Vancouver, British Columbia on November 26, 1966. The Saskatchewan Roughriders won their first Grey Cup after 53 years of competition for this trophy, after losing eight times. With Eagle Keys as head coach the Roughriders defeated the Ottawa Rough Riders led by Frank Clair by a score of 29–14. George Reed led all rushers with 23 carries and 133 yards and one rushing touchdown. Ottawa lost despite two TD passes of over 60 yards to the speedy long-ball threat Whit Tucker.

The gooseneck or slingshot field goal posts, invented by Jim Trimble and Joel Rottman, were installed for this game, marking their first appearance in a football championship game. They would be universally adopted across professional gridiron football the following year, with the NFL and AFL playoffs following the 54th Grey Cup (culminating in Super Bowl I) being the last professional contests to use double-support goalposts.

The game was called with four seconds left in regulation when fans swarmed the field in celebration.

== Starting quarterbacks ==
Ron Lancaster threw three touchdown passes for Saskatchewan while Russ Jackson had two for Ottawa. It was the only Grey cup win as a starter in Lancaster's career, as he lost his four subsequent Grey Cup appearances in 1967, 1969, 1972, and 1976, the first two under Eagle Keys as head coach, and the last two under Dave Skrien and John Payne, respectively. It was also the only Grey Cup loss in Jackson's career, who was the starting quarterback for Ottawa victories in the 48th Grey Cup of 1960 (of which Lancaster served as Jackson's backup quarterback for Ottawa), the 56th Grey Cup of 1968, and the 57th Grey Cup of 1969, his final year, all under head coach Frank Clair.

== Box score ==
First quarter

Ottawa – TD – Whit Tucker 61 yard pass from Russ Jackson (Moe Racine missed convert) 12:30 OTT 6 SSK 0

Saskatchewan – TD – Jim Worden 6 yard pass from Ron Lancaster (Jack Abendschan convert) 4:56 SSK 7 OTT 6

Second quarter

Saskatchewan – TD – Alan Ford 18 yard pass from Ron Lancaster (Jack Abendschan convert) 10:18 SSK 14 OTT 6

Ottawa – TD – Whit Tucker 85 yard pass from Russ Jackson (Moe Racine convert) 10:04 SSK 14 OTT 13

Ottawa – Single – Bill Cline 51 yard punt 4:37 SSK 14 OTT 14

Third quarter

No scoring.

Fourth quarter

Saskatchewan – TD – Hugh Campbell 5 yard pass from Ron Lancaster (Jack Abendschan convert) 14:55 SSK 21 OTT 14

Saskatchewan – TD – George Reed 31 yard run (Jack Abendschan convert) 6:30 SSK 28 OTT 14

Saskatchewan – Single – Alan Ford 43 yard punt 3:19 SSK 29 OTT 14

== Videos ==
Game highlights with all 6 TDs
