= Moe Racine =

Canadian football player (1937–2018)

No. 62
- Positions: Offensive tackle, Kicker

Personal information
- Born: October 13, 1937; Cornwall, Ontario, Canada
- Died: March 4, 2018 (aged 80); Ottawa, Ontario, Canada
- Listed height: 6 ft 4 in (1.93 m)
- Listed weight: 235 lb (107 kg)

Career history
- 1958–1974: Ottawa Rough Riders

Awards and highlights
- 4× Grey Cup champion (1960, 1968, 1969, 1973); 4× CFL East All-Star (1962, 1965, 1966, 1972); Eastern Conference scoring champion (1966); Ottawa Rough Rider record, most games played (213); Ottawa Rough Riders #62 retired
- Canadian Football Hall of Fame (Class of 2014)

Maurice Joseph "Moe The Toe" Racine (October 13, 1937 – March 4, 2018) was a placekicker and offensive lineman for the Ottawa Rough Riders from 1958 to 1974 of the Canadian Football League. He was part of four Grey Cup winning teams with the Rough Riders and was inducted into the Canadian Football Hall of Fame in the Class of 2014.

== High school ==
Born in Cornwall, Ontario, Canada, Racine attended St. Lawrence High School, now called l’École secondaire catholique La Citadelle. He played football for the school team and then he joined Ottawa St. Anthony's in 1958.

== Professional career ==
Moe Racine was an offensive tackle for the Ottawa Rough Riders throughout his 17-year career. Racine became a three-time Eastern Conference All-Star at tackle in 1962, 1965, and 1966.

Racine was also an accurate placekicker from 1962 to 1967. In 1961, Racine only handled the kickoffs, but then added placekicking the following year. Racine finished second in scoring in the Eastern Conference in 1962, 1964, and 1965, finally winning the East scoring crown in 1966 with 71 points. Racine's best field goal percentage was 57.1% (12 of 21) in 1965, his next best 52.4% (11 of 21) in 1964, which was considered good at a period when the league average was much lower than when placekicking became a specialty in the 1970s. Racine finished kicking during the 1967 season, ending his career with 392 career points.

In Racine's 17-year career, he participated in 5 Grey Cup games, winning four as a tackle: in 1960, 1968, 1969, 1973, losing one as tackle and placekicker in 1966, when he converted one of two Ottawa touchdowns.

His jersey number #62 was retired by the Rough Riders at the end of his career in 1974. Racine is a member of the Cornwall and Ottawa Sports Hall of Fame and in 2014 Moe Racine was inducted into the Canadian Football Hall of Fame.

There is also a book memoir "Moe The Toe - Never My Dream", released in late 2014 which chronicles Racine's life and football career. The book was written by his son Thom.

== Family ==
His son, Bruce Racine, is a former National Hockey League goalie. Bruce was a two-time all-American at Northeastern University and two-time Beanpot MVP and was a member of the 1991 Stanley Cup winning Pittsburgh Penguins - making a rare father and son combination of Grey Cup winner and Stanley Cup winner. Another son, Thom Racine, became a police officer with the Cornwall Police Service. It was announced on March 4, 2018, that Racine had died. He was 80 years old.
