= Whit Tucker =

Canadian football player (1940–2024)

No. 26
- Position: Wide receiver

Personal information
- Born: November 15, 1940; Windsor, Ontario, Canada
- Died: October 16, 2024 (aged 83)
- Listed height: 6 ft 0 in (1.83 m)
- Listed weight: 175 lb (79 kg)

Career information
- University: Western Ontario
- CFL draft: 1962: 2nd round, 9th overall pick

Career history
- 1962–1970: Ottawa Rough Riders

Awards and highlights
- 2× Grey Cup champion (1968, 1969); CFL All-Star (1967); 3× CFL East All-Star (1966, 1967, 1968); Gruen Trophy (1962); Outstanding Canadian player in the East Division (1968); Ottawa Rough Riders #26 retired; CFL record, highest career average gain receiving (22.4 yards/catch)
- Canadian Football Hall of Fame (Class of 1993)

Whitman Duncan Tucker (November 15, 1940 – October 16, 2024) was a Canadian professional football player who spent his entire career as a flanker for the Ottawa Rough Riders of the Canadian Football League (CFL). He was a CFL All-Star in 1967 and won two Grey Cup championships with Ottawa in 1968 and 1969.

== Early life and college ==
Tucker was an all-star high school athlete in Windsor, Ontario. He received a track scholarship to the University of Southern California upon graduation, but decided to attend the University of Western Ontario, where he was a three sport standout.

== Professional career ==
Playing for the Ottawa Rough Riders from 1962 to 1970, Tucker was an Eastern All-Star three times, a CFL All-Star in 1967, won the Gruen Trophy as best rookie in the Eastern Conference in 1962, and was the Outstanding Canadian player in the East Division in 1968. He was a two-time Grey Cup champion after helping his team win the 56th Grey Cup in 1968 and the 57th Grey Cup in 1969. He also played in the 54th Grey Cup in 1966. He holds the CFL record for highest career average gain receiving with 22.4 yards per catch over his career with Ottawa.

He was inducted into the Canadian Football Hall of Fame in 1993. He is also a member of the Windsor Sports Hall of Fame, the Ottawa Sports Hall of Fame, and the UWO Sports Hall of Fame.

== Post-football ==
Tucker later worked as an investment executive in Ottawa, Ontario. He died on October 16, 2024, at the age of 83.
