= Jim Mankins =

American gridiron football player (1944–2004)

Jim Makins
No. 33, 25, 16, 27
- Position: Running back

Personal information
- Born: June 23, 1944; Downey, California, U.S.
- Died: April 1, 2004 (aged 59); Anchorage, Alaska, U.S.
- Listed height: 6 ft 1 in (1.85 m)
- Listed weight: 235 lb (107 kg)

Career information
- High school: King City (CA)
- College: Oklahoma (1962); Florida State (1964-1966)
- NFL draft: 1966: 12th round, 184th overall pick
- AFL draft: 1966: Red Shirt 4th round, 28th overall pick

Career history
- Atlanta Falcons (1967); Ottawa Rough Riders (1968–1970); Edmonton Eskimos (1970)

Awards and highlights
- 2× Grey Cup champion (1968, 1969)

Career NFL statistics
- Rushing yards: 7
- Rushing average: 3.5
- Receptions: 1
- Receiving yards: 11
- Stats at Pro Football Reference

James Frank Mankins (June 23, 1944 – April 1, 2004) was a running back in the National Football League (NFL).

== Biography ==
Mankins was born James Frank Mankins on June 23, 1944 in Chino, California.

== Career ==
He played at the collegiate level at Florida State University and the University of Oklahoma.

Mankins was drafted 184th overall in the twelfth round of the 1966 NFL draft by the Green Bay Packers. He had also been drafted in the second round of the Red Shirt portion of the 1966 American Football League draft by the Miami Dolphins. Mankins would go on to play for the Atlanta Falcons.

After playing in the NFL, Mankins would play 3 seasons in the Canadian Football League. With the Ottawa Rough Riders from 1968 to 1970, he would win two Grey Cup championships. He was traded to the Edmonton Eskimos in 1970, finishing his football career there.
