= 1952 Toronto Argonauts season =

CFL team season

- Head coach: Frank Clair
- Home stadium: Varsity Stadium

Results
- Record: 7–4–1
- Division place: 2nd, IRFU
- Playoffs: Won Grey Cup

The 1952 Toronto Argonauts season was the 63rd season for the team since the franchise's inception in 1873. The team finished in second place in the Interprovincial Rugby Football Union with a 7–4–1 record and qualified for the playoffs for the third consecutive year. The Argonauts defeated the Hamilton Tiger-Cats two games to one in the IRFU Finals before winning the Eastern Final over the Sarnia Imperials. In the first ever Grey Cup between the current incarnation of the Edmonton Eskimos franchise, Toronto won their 10th Grey Cup championship by a score of 21–11. It was their second Grey Cup win in three years and their fifth championship in the previous eight years.

== Preseason ==
Week	Date	Opponent	Location	Final score	Record
A	Aug 16	Winnipeg Blue Bombers	Varsity Stadium	L 11–7	0–1
B	Aug 24	Hamilton Tiger-Cats	Civic Stadium	L 14–8	0–2

== Regular season ==
=== Standings ===
Interprovincial Rugby Football Union
Team	GP	W	L	T	PF	PA	Pts
Hamilton Tiger-Cats	12	9	2	1	268	162	19
Toronto Argonauts	12	7	4	1	265	191	15
Ottawa Rough Riders	12	5	7	0	200	238	10
Montreal Alouettes	12	2	10	0	136	278	4

=== Schedule ===
Week	Date	Opponent	Location	Final score	Record
1	Sept 1	@ Hamilton Tiger-Cats	Ivor Wynne Stadium	W 33–13	1–0–0
2	Sept 6	Montreal Alouettes	Varsity Stadium	W 43–0	2–0–0
3	Sept 13	Ottawa Rough Riders	Varsity Stadium	W 24–19	3–0–0
4	Sept 20	Hamilton Tiger-Cats	Varsity Stadium	T 13–13	3–0–1
5	Sept 28	@ Montreal Alouettes	Delorimier Stadium	W 12–6	4–0–1
6	Oct 4	@ Ottawa Rough Riders	Lansdowne Park	L 25–21	4–1–1
7	Oct 11	Hamilton Tiger-Cats	Varsity Stadium	L 27–18	4–2–1
7	Oct 13	@ Hamilton Tiger-Cats	Ivor Wynne Stadium	L 25–16	4–3–1
8	Oct 18	@ Ottawa Rough Riders	Lansdowne Park	W 25–6	5–3–1
9	Oct 25	Ottawa Rough Riders	Varsity Stadium	W 20–14	6–3–1
10	Nov 2	@ Montreal Alouettes	Delorimier Stadium	W 29–18	7–3–1
11	Nov 8	Montreal Alouettes	Varsity Stadium	L 25–11	7–4–1

== Postseason ==
Game	Date	Opponent	Location	Final score
IRFU Final Game 1	Nov 15	@ Hamilton Tiger-Cats	Ivor Wynne Stadium	W 22–6
IRFU Final Game 2	Nov 19	Hamilton Tiger-Cats	Varsity Stadium	L 27–11
IRFU Final Game 3	Nov 22	@ Hamilton Tiger-Cats	Ivor Wynne Stadium	W 12–7
Eastern Final	Nov 26	Sarnia Imperials	Varsity Stadium	W 34–15
Grey Cup	Nov 29	Edmonton Eskimos	Varsity Stadium	W 21–11

=== Grey Cup ===
November 29 @ Varsity Stadium (Attendance: 27,391)

Team	Q1	Q2	Q3	Q4	Total
Edmonton Eskimos	5	0	6	0	11
Toronto Argonauts	0	15	0	6	21
