= Joe Stracina =

Canadian football player

Profile
- Position: Centre

Personal information
- Born: July 18, 1930; Montreal, Quebec, Canada
- Died: August 13, 1996 (aged 66)

Career history
- 1952: Saskatchewan Roughriders
- 1954–1960: Ottawa Rough Riders
- 1961–1964: Montreal Alouettes

Awards and highlights
- Grey Cup champion (1960)

Joe Stracina (July 18, 1930 – August 13, 1996) was a Canadian professional football lineman who played eleven seasons for the Saskatchewan Roughriders, Ottawa Rough Riders and Montreal Alouettes.
