= 1968 Calgary Stampeders season =

Canadian football team season

- General manager: Rogers Lehew
- Head coach: Jerry Williams
- Home stadium: McMahon Stadium

Results
- Record: 10–6
- Division place: 2nd, West
- Playoffs: Lost Grey Cup

The 1968 Calgary Stampeders finished in second place in the Western Conference with a 10–6 record. They appeared in the Grey Cup where they lost to the Ottawa Rough Riders.

== Regular season ==
=== Season standings ===
Western Football Conference
Team	GP	W	L	T	PF	PA	Pts
Saskatchewan Roughriders	16	12	3	1	345	223	25
Calgary Stampeders	16	10	6	0	412	249	20
Edmonton Eskimos	16	8	7	1	228	288	17
BC Lions	16	4	11	1	217	318	9
Winnipeg Blue Bombers	16	3	13	0	210	374	6

=== Season schedule ===
Week	Game	Date	Opponent	Results		Venue	Attendance
Week	Game	Date	Opponent	Score	Record	Venue	Attendance
	1		Saskatchewan Roughriders	L 24–25	0–1		
	2		BC Lions	W 41–7	1–1		
	3		Winnipeg Blue Bombers	W 43–8	2–1		
	4		Winnipeg Blue Bombers	W 31–0	3–1		
	5		Toronto Argonauts	L 7–19	3–2		
	6		Edmonton Eskimos	W 12–7	4–2		
	7		BC Lions	W 26–6	5–2		
	8		Edmonton Eskimos	L 8–10	5–3		
	9		Hamilton Tiger-Cats	W 35–14	6–3		
	10		Ottawa Rough Riders	W 27–24	7–3		
	11		Saskatchewan Roughriders	W 38–35	8–3		
	12		Montreal Alouettes	W 26–10	9–3		
	13		Saskatchewan Roughriders	L 15–19	9–4		
	14		Edmonton Eskimos	L 3–14	9–5		
	15		BC Lions	W 42–23	10–5		
	16		Winnipeg Blue Bombers	L 24–28	10–6		

== Playoffs ==
=== West Semi-Final ===
Western Semi-Finals
Edmonton Eskimos @ Calgary Stampeders
Date	Away	Home
November 10	Edmonton Eskimos 13	Calgary Stampeders 29

=== West Final ===
Western Finals – Game 1
Calgary Stampeders @ Saskatchewan Roughriders
Date	Away	Home
November 16	Calgary Stampeders 32	Saskatchewan Roughriders 0

Western Finals – Game 2
Saskatchewan Roughriders @ Calgary Stampeders
Date	Away	Home	
November 20	Saskatchewan Roughriders 12	Calgary Stampeders 25	OT

- Calgary wins the best of three series 2–0. The Stampeders will advance to the Grey Cup Championship game.

=== Grey Cup ===
November 30 56th Annual Grey Cup Game: CNE Stadium – Toronto, Ontario
Western Champion	Eastern Champion
Calgary Stampeders 21	Ottawa Rough Riders 24
The Ottawa Rough Riders are the 1968 Grey Cup Champions
Vic Washington (RB), Ottawa Rough Riders – Grey Cup's Most Valuable Player.

== Awards and records ==
=== 1968 CFL All-Stars ===
- TE – Herman Harrison, CFL All-Star
- LB – Wayne Harris, CFL All-Star
- DB – Frank Andruski, CFL All-Star
