= 1954 Edmonton Eskimos season =

Canadian football team season

- General manager: Al Anderson
- Head coach: Pop Ivy
- Home stadium: Clarke Stadium

Results
- Record: 11–5
- Division place: 1st, WIFU
- Playoffs: Won Grey Cup

The 1954 Edmonton Eskimos finished in first place in the Western Interprovincial Football Union with an 11–5 record and won the 42nd Grey Cup, the first championship in franchise history.

== Pre-season ==
=== Schedule ===
Game	Date	Opponent	Results		Venue	Attendance
Game	Date	Opponent	Score	Record	Venue	Attendance
A	Fri, Aug 13	at Toronto Argonauts	W 16–7	1–0	Varsity Stadium	10,000
A	Mon, Aug 16	at Ottawa Rough Riders	L 18–19	2–2	Landsdowne Park Stadium	8,000
B	Wed, Aug 18	at Kitchener-Waterloo Dutchmen	W 28–6	2–1		4,500

== Regular season ==
=== Standings ===
Western Interprovincial Football Union
Team	GP	W	L	T	PF	PA	Pts
Edmonton Eskimos	16	11	5	0	255	163	22
Saskatchewan Roughriders	16	10	4	2	239	204	22
Winnipeg Blue Bombers	16	8	6	2	202	190	18
Calgary Stampeders	16	8	8	0	271	165	16
BC Lions	16	1	15	0	100	345	2

=== Schedule ===
Week	Game	Date	Opponent	Results		Venue	Attendance
Week	Game	Date	Opponent	Score	Record	Venue	Attendance
1	1	Sat, Aug 21	at Saskatchewan Roughriders	L 13–21	0–1	Taylor Field	12,000
1	2	Mon, Aug 23	at Winnipeg Blue Bombers	L 3–7	0–2	Winnipeg Stadium	17,385
2	Bye						
3	3	Mon, Sept 6	BC Lions	W 12–6	1–2	Clarke Stadium	18,000
4	4	Sat, Sept 11	vs. Calgary Stampeders	W 30–11	2–2	Clarke Stadium	18,795
4	5	Mon, Sept 13	at Calgary Stampeders	L 6–20	2–3	Mewata Stadium	15,090
5	6	Mon, Sept 20	at BC Lions	W 23–13	3–3	Empire Stadium	21,186
6	7	Sat, Sept 25	vs. Winnipeg Blue Bombers	W 12–8	4–3	Clarke Stadium	17,841
7	8	Mon, Sept 27	vs. Saskatchewan Roughriders	L 6–8	4–4	Clarke Stadium	15,161
8	9	Sat, Oct 2	at Calgary Stampeders	W 13–12	5–4	Mewata Stadium	10,000
8	10	Mon, Oct 4	vs. Calgary Stampeders	W 21–6	6–4	Clarke Stadium	17,000
9	11	Sat, Oct 9	at Winnipeg Blue Bombers	W 16–5	7–4	Winnipeg Stadium	18,538
9	12	Mon, Oct 11	at Saskatchewan Roughriders	L 2–12	7–5	Taylor Field	14,778
10	13	Sat, Oct 16	vs. BC Lions	W 31–3	8–5	Clarke Stadium	15,000
10	14	Mon, Oct 18	at BC Lions	W 22–0	9–5	Empire Stadium	13,136
11	15	Sat, Oct 23	Saskatchewan Roughriders	W 24–19	10–5	Clarke Stadium	18,236
11	16	Mon, Oct 25	Winnipeg Blue Bombers	W 21–12	11–5	Clarke Stadium	19,000

== Playoffs ==
Round	Date	Opponent	Results		Venue	Attendance
Round	Date	Opponent	Score	Record	Venue	Attendance
Western Final #1	Sat, Nov 6	vs. Winnipeg Blue Bombers	W 9–3	1–0	Clarke Stadium	19,817
Western Final #2	Thu, Nov 11	at Winnipeg Blue Bombers	L 6–12	1–1	Winnipeg Stadium	20,933
Western Final #3	Sat, Nov 13	vs. Winnipeg Blue Bombers	W 10–5	2–1	Clarke Stadium	17,000
Grey Cup Semi-Final	Sat, Nov 20	vs. Kitchener-Waterloo Dutchmen	W 38–6	3–1	Clarke Stadium	8,000
42nd Grey Cup	Sat, Nov 27	vs. Montreal Alouettes	W 26–25	4–1	Varsity Stadium	27,321

=== Grey Cup ===
Teams	1	2	3	4	Final
Edmonton Eskimos	11	3	0	12	26
Montreal Alouettes	6	12	1	6	25
