= Ron Stewart (Canadian football) =

Canadian football player

Profile
- Position: Running back

Personal information
- Born: September 25, 1934 (age 92); Toronto, Ontario, Canada
- Listed height: 5 ft 8 in (1.73 m)
- Listed weight: 180 lb (82 kg)

Career information
- University: Queen's
- CFL draft: 1958: undrafted

Career history
- Ottawa Rough Riders (1958–1970)

Awards and highlights
- 3× Grey Cup champion (1960, 1968, 1969); Grey Cup MVP (1960); CFL's Most Outstanding Canadian Award (1960); Jeff Russel Memorial Trophy (1960); Lionel Conacher Award (1960); 3× CFL East All-Star (1960, 1961, 1964); CFL record, most rushing yards, single game (287); Ottawa Rough Riders #11 retired

Career CFL statistics
- Carries: 980
- Rushing yards: 5,689
- Average: 5.8
- Touchdowns: 42
- Canadian Football Hall of Fame (Class of 1977)

Ronald L. Stewart (born September 25, 1934) is a Canadian former professional football running back for the Ottawa Rough Riders of the Canadian Football League (CFL). He played for 13 seasons for the Rough Riders, winning three Grey Cup championships and won the CFL's Most Outstanding Canadian Award in 1960. He played college football for the Queen's Golden Gaels.

== Early life ==
Born in Toronto, Stewart played football at Riverdale Collegiate Institute in Toronto and then at Queen's University in Kingston between 1953 and 1957, where he was the team's most valuable player three times and played on two Yates Cup championship teams (1955 and 1956). He was voted MVP of the 1957 season.

== Professional career ==
Stewart, though smaller than most players at 5 foot 7 inches, went on to a 13-year career with the Ottawa Rough Riders from 1958 to 1970. Stewart was an Eastern Conference all star running back in 1960, 1961 and 1964.

Stewart played on Grey Cup winning teams in 1960, 1968 and 1969, and also played in the 1966 Grey Cup on the losing side. He especially starred in the 1969 Grey Cup with 2 TD receptions for 80 and 32 yards.

Stewart rushed for 5,690 yards on 983 attempts and tallied 42 touchdowns in his career. He capped his 1960 season by winning the CFL's Most Outstanding Canadian Award and by setting the CFL record for rushing yards in one game with 287 (on 15 carries, which included touchdown runs of 37, 52, 51 and 59 yards) against the Montreal Alouettes on October 10, 1960. His totals were 139 rushes for 1,020 yards that year, and being only the 3rd Canadian player to top the thousand yards in a season mark. Stewart was voted the winner of the Lionel Conacher Award as Canada's top male athlete of the year.

Stewart has been inducted into the Queen's University Sports Hall of Fame, the Ottawa Sports Hall of Fame, the Canadian Football Hall of Fame (1977) and Canada's Sports Hall of Fame (1989).

== Career CFL regular season rushing statistics ==
| Year | Team | GP | Rush | Yards | Y/R | TD | LG |
|---|---|---|---|---|---|---|---|
| 1958 | Ottawa Rough Riders | | 3 | 1 | 0.3 | 0 | 3 |
| 1959 | Ottawa Rough Riders | | 82 | 425 | 5.2 | 2 | 31 |
| 1960 | Ottawa Rough Riders | 14 | 139 | 1020 | 7.3 | 15 | 59 |
| 1961 | Ottawa Rough Riders | 12 | 107 | 706 | 6.6 | 6 | 72 |
| 1962 | Ottawa Rough Riders | 14 | 96 | 555 | 5.8 | 2 | 68 |
| 1963 | Ottawa Rough Riders | 14 | 103 | 523 | 5.1 | 3 | 35 |
| 1964 | Ottawa Rough Riders | 14 | 144 | 867 | 6 | 5 | 45 |
| 1965 | Ottawa Rough Riders | 14 | 68 | 314 | 4.8 | 2 | 16 |
| 1966 | Ottawa Rough Riders | 14 | 89 | 431 | 4.8 | 3 | 41 |
| 1967 | Ottawa Rough Riders | 14 | 64 | 488 | 7.6 | 4 | 70 |
| 1968 | Ottawa Rough Riders | 14 | 31 | 114 | 3.7 | 0 | 16 |
| 1969 | Ottawa Rough Riders | 14 | 29 | 151 | 5.2 | 1 | 26 |
| 1970 | Ottawa Rough Riders | 8 | 28 | 95 | 3.4 | 0 | 12 |
| | CFL Totals | | 983 | 5690 | 5.8 | 43 | 72 |

== Accusations ==
Stewart graduated from the University of Ottawa with a law degree. After his retirement from football, he was appointed the ombudsman for the federal correction system in 1977, which post he held until his retirement in 2003.

Since his retirement, Stewart has been the subject of an investigation by the Office of the Auditor General of Canada, Sheila Fraser. Her report of November 28, 2006 made allegations regarding Stewart, who the Canadian Broadcasting Corporation reported was accused of "often skipping work and collecting $325,000 in improper or questionable salary, vacation pay and expenses during a six-year period of his 26 years in office." The file was handed over to the Royal Canadian Mounted Police for investigation.

The list of allegations included:

- hundreds of thousands of dollars in questionable payments, including money for days he spent on vacation
- travel to cities hosting the Grey Cup championships that he billed as a trip taken to “investigate inmate complaints”
- the purchase of two computers used by his family
- collecting nearly $100,000 for vacation pay (claiming he hadn’t taken a vacation for 14 years of his 26-year stint as ombudsman)
- handing out performance bonuses over six years and of budget surpluses to staffers, disguised as overtime payments, that totaled over $260,000

The RCMP investigation found no evidence of wrongdoing.

Stewart eventually agreed to pay back $77,500 of the money.

Wendy Stewart, Ron's wife and a former Ottawa city Councillor, believes that many of the legal problems are due to the fact that her husband has been suffering from significant memory loss for decades. Though she does not remember her husband suffering many concussions, she believes his small size for a pro football player led to many hits to his head. Ron Stewart now has trouble remembering much beyond the present, and while physically healthy, needs constant help with his memory.

== Personal life ==
He is married to Wendy Stewart, a former Ottawa city councillor.
