= 1968 Hamilton Tiger-Cats season =

CFL team season

- General manager: Ralph Sazio
- Head coach: Joe Restic
- Home stadium: Civic Stadium

Results
- Record: 6–7–1
- Division place: 3rd, East
- Playoffs: Lost Eastern Semi-Final
- Team MOP: Tommy Joe Coffey
- Team MODP: Billy Ray Locklin

The 1968 Hamilton Tiger-Cats season was the 11th season for the team in the Canadian Football League (CFL) and their 19th overall. The Tiger-Cats finished in third place in the Eastern Conference with an 6–7–1 record, but lost the Eastern Semi-Final to the Toronto Argonauts.

== Offseason ==
Wide receiver Ted Watkins was shot and killed while allegedly robbing a liquor store in Stockton, California, prior to the start of the season.

== Regular season ==
=== Season standings ===
Eastern Football Conference
Team	GP	W	L	T	PF	PA	Pts
Ottawa Rough Riders	14	9	3	2	416	271	20
Toronto Argonauts	14	9	5	0	264	266	18
Hamilton Tiger-Cats	14	6	7	1	262	292	13
Montreal Alouettes	14	3	9	2	234	327	8

=== Season schedule ===
Week	Game	Date	Opponent	Results		Venue	Attendance
Week	Game	Date	Opponent	Score	Record	Venue	Attendance
1	1	Thu, Aug 1	at Ottawa Rough Riders	L 13–53	0–1	Lansdowne Park	23,759
2	2	Sat, Aug 10	vs. Montreal Alouettes	W 31–25	1–1	Civic Stadium	19,785
3	3	Sat, Aug 17	vs. Saskatchewan Roughriders	W 9–3	2–1	Civic Stadium	24,393
4	Bye						
5	4	Wed, Aug 28	at Montreal Alouettes	L 21–23	2–2	Autostade	23,500
6	5	Mon, Sept 2	vs. Toronto Argonauts	L 15–18	2–3	Civic Stadium	27,153
7	6	Sun, Sept 8	at Toronto Argonauts	W 20–8	3–3	Exhibition Stadium	33,135
8	Bye						
9	7	Wed, Sept 18	vs. Calgary Stampeders	L 14–35	3–4	Civic Stadium	25,023
10	8	Sat, Sept 28	at Edmonton Eskimos	W 31–7	4–4	Joseph A. Clarke Memorial Stadium	21,500
10	9	Mon, Sept 30	at BC Lions	W 16–13	5–4	Empire Stadium	25,165
11	10	Sat, Oct 5	vs. Winnipeg Blue Bombers	W 23–13	6–4	Civic Stadium	18,123
12	11	Sun, Oct 13	vs. Ottawa Rough Riders	L 23–36	6–5	Civic Stadium	29,960
13	12	Sat, Oct 19	at Ottawa Rough Riders	L 24–27	6–6	Lansdowne Park	25,411
14	13	Sun, Oct 27	vs. Toronto Argonauts	L 1–12	6–7	Civic Stadium	24,206
15	14	Sat, Nov 2	at Montreal Alouettes	T 21–21	6–7–1	Autostade	8,000

== Post-season ==
Round	Date	Opponent	Results		Venue	Attendance
Round	Date	Opponent	Score	Record	Venue	Attendance
Eastern Semi-Final	Sat, Nov 9	at Toronto Argonauts	L 21–33	0–1	Exhibition Stadium	25,723

== Awards and honours ==
=== CFL All-Stars ===
- Tommy Joe Coffey, TE
- Bill Danychuk, OG
- Garney Henley, DB
- Billy Ray Locklin, DE
