= 1968 Ottawa Rough Riders season =

Canadian football team season

- Owner: Sam Berger
- General manager: Red O'Quinn
- Head coach: Frank Clair
- Home stadium: Lansdowne Park

Results
- Record: 9–3–2
- Division place: 1st, East
- Playoffs: Won Grey Cup

The 1968 Ottawa Rough Riders finished in first place in the Eastern Conference with a 9–3–2 record and won the 56th Grey Cup by defeating the Calgary Stampeders 24–21

== Preseason ==
Game	Date	Opponent	Results		Venue	Attendance
Game	Date	Opponent	Score	Record	Venue	Attendance
A	July 11	vs. Calgary Stampeders	T 15–15	0–0–1		
B	July 17	vs. BC Lions	W 22–15	1–0–1		
C	July 22	at Winnipeg Blue Bombers	W 43–35	2–0–1		
C	July 24	at Saskatchewan Roughriders	L 13–29	2–1–1		

== Regular season ==
=== Standings ===
Eastern Football Conference
Team	GP	W	L	T	PF	PA	Pts
Ottawa Rough Riders	14	9	3	2	416	271	20
Toronto Argonauts	14	9	5	0	284	266	18
Hamilton Tiger-Cats	14	6	7	1	262	292	13
Montreal Alouettes	14	3	9	2	234	327	8

=== Schedule ===
Week	Game	Date	Opponent	Results		Venue	Attendance
Week	Game	Date	Opponent	Score	Record	Venue	Attendance
1	1	Aug 1	vs. Hamilton Tiger-Cats	W 53–13	1–0		
2	2	Aug 9	at Toronto Argonauts	W 38–14	2–0		
3	3	Aug 14	vs. Saskatchewan Roughriders	W 37–23	3–0		
4	4	Aug 22	at Montreal Alouettes	L 24–25	3–1		
5	5	Sept 4	vs. Winnipeg Blue Bombers	W 24–17	4–1		
6	6	Sept 11	at Edmonton Eskimos	L 20–25	4–2		
6	7	Sept 14	at BC Lions	T 22–22	4–2–1		
7	8	Sept 21	vs. Calgary Stampeders	L 24–27	4–3–1		
8	9	Sept 28	at Montreal Alouettes	W 30–20	5–3–1		
9	10	Oct 6	vs. Toronto Argonauts	W 31–10	6–3–1		
10	11	Oct 13	at Hamilton Tiger-Cats	W 36–23	7–3–1		
11	12	Oct 19	vs. Hamilton Tiger-Cats	W 27–24	8–3–1		
12	13	Oct 26	vs. Montreal Alouettes	T 19–19	8–3–2		
13	14	Nov 3	at Toronto Argonauts	W 31–9	9–3–2		

== Postseason ==
=== Playoffs ===
Round	Date	Opponent	Results		Venue	Attendance
Round	Date	Opponent	Score	Record	Venue	Attendance
East Final #1	Nov 17	at Toronto Argonauts	L 11–13	9–4–2		
East Final #2	Nov 24	vs. Toronto Argonauts	W 36–14	10–4–2		
Grey Cup	Nov 30	vs.Calgary Stampeders	W 24–21	11–4–2		

=== Grey Cup ===
Teams	1 Q	2 Q	3 Q	4 Q	Final
Calgary Stampeders	0	14	0	7	21
Ottawa Roughriders	1	3	7	13	24

== Player stats ==
=== Passing ===
Player	Games Played	Attempts	Completions	Percentage	Yards	Touchdowns	Interceptions
Russ Jackson	14	305	171	56.1%	3187	25	16

== Awards and honours ==
- CFL's Most Outstanding Lineman Award – Ken Lehmann (LB)
- Grey Cup Most Valuable Player – Vic Washington (RB)
- Russ Jackson, QB, Eastern Division All-Star

=== CFL All-Stars ===
- Russ Jackson, QB
