= Margene Adkins =

American football player (born 1947)

No. 23, 26
- Position: Wide receiver

Personal information
- Born: April 30, 1947 (age 79); Fort Worth, Texas, U.S.
- Listed height: 5 ft 10 in (1.78 m)
- Listed weight: 183 lb (83 kg)

Career information
- High school: Kirkpatrick (TX)
- College: Henderson County JC
- NFL draft: 1970: 2nd round, 49th overall pick

Career history
- 1967–1969: Ottawa Rough Riders
- 1970–1971: Dallas Cowboys
- 1972: New Orleans Saints
- 1973–1974: New York Jets
- 1975: Chicago Winds

Awards and highlights
- Super Bowl champion (VI); NFL kickoff return yards leader (1972); 2× Grey Cup champion (1968, 1969); CFL All-Star (1969); 2× CFL East All-Star (1967, 1969)

Career NFL statistics
- Games played: 35
- Kick returns: 84
- Kick return yards: 1,784
- Stats at Pro Football Reference

Margene Adkins (born April 30, 1947) is an American former professional football player who was a wide receiver in the National Football League (NFL) for the Dallas Cowboys, New Orleans Saints and New York Jets. He also was a member of the Ottawa Rough Riders in the Canadian Football League (CFL) and the Chicago Winds in the World Football League (WFL). He played college football at Henderson County Junior College.

== Early life ==
Margene Adkins attended Kirkpatrick High School, where he practiced basketball until his junior year, when he began playing football. He played college football at Henderson County Junior College in Athens, Texas, where he participated in the Junior Rose Bowl twice. He had a brief stay at Wichita University, before dropping out of school.

== Professional career ==
=== Ottawa Rough Riders ===
While still a teenager, he joined the Ottawa Rough Riders of the Canadian Football League as a wide receiver. In 1969, Adkins was voted to the CFL All-Star team after setting a regular season record for the highest average gain per pass reception at 25.0 yards, a record that stood for twenty-eight years (broken by Milt Stegall).

He was part of both Ottawa's Grey Cup winning teams in 1968 and 1969, catching an important 70-yard touchdown pass in the 1968 game when the Rough Riders defeated the Calgary Stampeders 24–21. Because he signed his original contract as a 19-year-old minor, he played out his option. He played three years, registering 47, 32 and 56 receptions, while averaging 10 touchdowns per season.

=== Dallas Cowboys ===
Adkins was selected by the Dallas Cowboys in the second round (49th overall) of the 1970 NFL draft. Having star wide receivers such as Lance Alworth and Bob Hayes, the team used Adkins primarily as a punt and kick returner during his two seasons, when injuries didn't limit him.

In 1970, he was placed on the injured reserve list, after playing in 5 games. In 1971, he only played in three games because of injuries and was placed on the team's taxi squad. Although he wasn't on the active roster when the Cowboys won Super Bowl VI, he still received a ring and a full share of the playoff bonuses.

In 1972, he asked the Cowboys to trade him, so he was sent to the New Orleans Saints in exchange for second round draft choice (#39-John Babinecz).

=== New Orleans Saints ===
In 1972, he was acquired after he impressed the New Orleans Saints during a 1971 preseason game, where he had 3 receptions for 138 yards and 2 touchdowns. He led the NFL in both kickoff returns with 1,020 yards and a 23.7 average, even though he played through an ankle injury.

On June 5, 1973, he was traded to the New York Jets along with punter Julian Fagan and an eight-round draft choice (#192-Larry Lightfoot), in exchange for quarterback Bob Davis, punter Steve O'Neal and a fourth round draft choice (#83-Clint Haslerig).

=== New York Jets ===
Injuries also hampered his 1973 season with the New York Jets. He started 5 games, posting 6 receptions for 109 yards. After he injured his knee during the 1974 offseason, Adkins was placed on injured reserve and eventually released before the start of the 1975 season.

=== Chicago Winds ===
In 1975, he joined the Chicago Winds of the World Football League, catching 12 passes for 130 and one touchdown. The Winds folded before the season ended, finishing 1–4. Adkins was selected by the San Antonio Wings in the Chicago Winds dispersal draft, but he didn't play for the team.

== Personal life ==
Adkins worked as a firefighter for Lockheed Martin in his hometown of Fort Worth, Texas.
