= Stephen Jones (Canadian football) =

American gridiron football player (born 1960)

No. 89
- Positions: Wide receiver, Running back

Personal information
- Born: June 8, 1960 (age 66); Flint, Michigan, U.S.
- Listed height: 6 ft 0 in (1.83 m)
- Listed weight: 185 lb (84 kg)

Career information
- College: Central Michigan

Career history
- 1985: Saskatchewan Roughriders
- 1986–1989: Edmonton Eskimos
- 1990–1994: Ottawa Rough Riders

Awards and highlights
- Grey Cup champion (1987); 2× CFL All-Star (1990, 1992); 3× CFL East All-Star (1990, 1992, 1993)

Career CFL statistics
- Receptions: 439
- Receiving yards: 8,256
- Total TDs: 51

Stephen Jones (born June 8, 1960) is an American former professional football wide receiver who played ten seasons in the Canadian Football League (CFL) with the Saskatchewan Roughriders, Edmonton Eskimos and Ottawa Rough Riders. He played college football at Central Michigan University. Jones was a member of the Edmonton Eskimos team that won the 75th Grey Cup. He was also a two-time CFL All-Star and three-time CFL East All-Star.

== Early life ==
Jones was born in Flint, Michigan, and started playing football at the age of seven. He played quarterback on the Beecher High School varsity football team, and played on the varsity basketball and baseball teams. Jones was also a member of his high school track team, competing in the 60 and 100-yard dash.

== College career ==
Jones was Central Michigan University's first African American starting quarterback, for three out of his four years at CMU. In his senior year he moved to split end and finished third in receiving. Over the course of his university career he won two Mid-American Conference (MAC) championships in 1979, 1980 and won MAC player of the week twice.

== Professional career ==
Jones started his professional career as a late cut with the Detroit Lions in 1983, and was with the Philadelphia Eagles for part of 1984.

=== Saskatchewan Roughriders ===
In 1984, Jones signed with the Saskatchewan Roughriders. In 1985 he was traded to the Ottawa Rough Riders; however he was subsequently released that year.

=== Edmonton Eskimos ===
In 1986, Jones signed with the Edmonton Eskimos, and was the Western Division leader for kickoff return yards. In 1987, he was second in leading pass receiving with 55 catches for 1,147 yards and 8 touchdowns. He led Edmonton with 51 kickoff returns for 957 yards placing him second in the CFL for kickoff returns. That year the Eskimos went on to win the 75th Grey Cup over the Toronto Argonauts 38-36.

In 1988, Jones caught 26 passes for 389 yards and led the Eskimos in kickoff returns with 31 for 635 yards, including one for 88 yards. In 1989, he played 7 games with Edmonton, recording 21 pass receptions for 374 yards. Stephen spent most of the season recovering from a shoulder injury.

=== Ottawa Rough Riders ===
In 1990, Jones finished the regular season playing for the Ottawa Rough Riders, ranking first in pass receiving and registered 59 receptions for 1182 yards and 11 touchdowns ranking him fourth overall in the CFL. He had a 20.0 yard per reception average and his longest catch was a 66-yard pass. He finished second with 11 touchdowns. Jones had 11 kickoff returns for 175 yards. He was also named an All-Eastern and CFL All Star this year.

In 1991, Jones missed 4 games due to a hamstring injury, but still ranked second on the team in receiving with 661 yards on 39 receptions. He also ranked first on the team with 7 receiving touchdowns. Jones made 5 kickoff returns for 114 yards, and had 5 receptions for 92 yards and 2 touchdowns against the Saskatchewan Rough Riders.

In 1992, Jones finished the season with 1,400 yards receiving. He registered 254 yards receiving against Toronto on 10 receptions. He tied a Rider single game record with three touchdowns receiving. Jones also led the Riders with 10 touchdowns. He also had three 100 plus yard receiving games (254 v. Toronto, 101 yards v. Sask. And 135 v. Winnipeg). He was named the offensive player of the game twice, and claimed the longest reception of the year against Saskatchewan with 55 yards. Again Jones was named an Eastern and CFL All Star, and Team MVP.

In 1993, Jones was named All-Eastern All Star for the third time. He finished the year with 1279 yards on 74 catches and 6 touchdowns. He caught the game winning 56 yard touchdown pass with under 10 seconds to go at the SkyDome giving Ottawa a 26-25 win over Toronto. Stephen was named the Offensive Player of the Game four times. He also recorded seven 100 plus games and averaged over 10 yards per reception in 15 games. Stephen caught 9 passes for 157 yards against Toronto, and 8 passes for 144 yards against Winnipeg.

In 1994, Jones started in nine games and finished second in Rider receiving with 591 yards on 32 receptions. He had three 100 plus yards receiving games. That year Stephen also had a single-game season high with 7 receptions v. Baltimore.

In 1995, Jones began marketing and coaching for the Ottawa Rough Riders until 1996, where he then served as a guest football analyst for a local sports radio station.

== See also ==
- Ottawa Rough Riders all-time records and statistics
- List of Canadian Football League records (individual)
- 1990 CFL season
- 1992 CFL season
