= Bob Simpson (Canadian football) =

Canadian football player (1930–2007)

No. 70
- Positions: FW, tight end, defensive back

Personal information
- Born: April 20, 1930; Windsor, Ontario, Canada
- Died: November 28, 2007 (aged 77); Ottawa, Ontario, Canada
- Listed height: 6 ft 0 in (1.83 m)
- Listed weight: 205 lb (93 kg)

Career history
- 1949: Windsor Rockets
- 1950–1962: Ottawa Rough Riders

Awards and highlights
- 2× Grey Cup champion (1951, 1960); 7× CFL East All-Star (1951, 1952, 1953, 1956–1959); Ottawa Rough Riders #70 retired; Ottawa Rough Rider record, most career touchdowns (70)
- Canadian Football Hall of Fame (Class of 1976)

Robert L. Simpson (April 20, 1930 – November 28, 2007) was a professional Canadian football player for the Ottawa Rough Riders, and was elected to the Canadian Football Hall of Fame in 1976. He was an IRFU all-star at four different positions throughout his career and was a two-time Grey Cup champion, winning with Ottawa in 1951 and 1960. He also represented Canada in basketball at the 1952 Summer Olympics in Helsinki.

He was the Rough Riders nominee for the Schenley Most Outstanding Player in 1956, Schenley Most Outstanding Canadian Award three times, and was Most Outstanding Canadian runner-up in 1956. Over his career with the Rough Riders, Simpson caught 274 passes for 6,034 yards and 65 touchdowns. On defense, he recorded 18 interceptions for 192 return yards and three touchdowns while on punt returns, he had 53 returns for 376 yards (7.1 yard average) and one touchdown. He was the first Rough Riders player to record 1000 receiving yards in a season, doing so in 1956.

He was named to the Ottawa Sports Hall of Fame in 1967 and the Windsor/Essex County Sports Hall of Fame Museum in 1982.

Simpson represented Wellington Ward on Ottawa City Council from 1960 to 1963.

== Olympic basketball ==
He was part of the Canadian basketball team that competed in the 1952 Summer Olympics which was eliminated after the group stage in the 1952 tournament. He played five matches.
