= 1956 Ottawa Rough Riders season =

Canadian football team season

- Head coach: Frank Clair
- Home stadium: Lansdowne Park

Results
- Record: 7–7
- Division place: 3rd, IRFU
- Playoffs: Lost East Semi-Final

The 1956 Ottawa Rough Riders finished in third place in the IRFU with a 7–7 record but lost to the Hamilton Tiger-Cats in the East Semi-Final.

== Preseason ==
Week	Date	Opponent	Result	Record
A	Aug 3	vs. Saskatchewan Roughriders	W 13–1	1–0
B	Aug 10	vs. Edmonton Eskimos	W 33–13	2–0

== Regular season ==
=== Standings ===
Interprovincial Rugby Football Union
Team	GP	W	L	T	PF	PA	Pts
Montreal Alouettes	14	10	4	0	478	361	20
Hamilton Tiger-Cats	14	7	7	0	383	385	14
Ottawa Rough Riders	14	7	7	0	326	359	14
Toronto Argonauts	14	4	10	0	331	413	8

=== Schedule ===
Week	Game	Date	Opponent	Result	Record
1	1	Aug 22	at Hamilton Tiger-Cats	W 29–21	1–0
2	2	Aug 31	vs. Montreal Alouettes	L 10–42	1–1
2	3	Sept 3	at Montreal Alouettes	L 20–22	1–2
3	4	Sept 8	vs. Hamilton Tiger-Cats	L 0–21	1–3
4	5	Sept 12	at Montreal Alouettes	L 21–36	1–4
4	6	Sept 15	vs. Montreal Alouettes	W 20–9	2–4
5	7	Sept 22	at Toronto Argonauts	W 31–20	3–4
6	8	Sept 29	vs. Toronto Argonauts	W 43–22	4–4
7	9	Oct 6	vs. Montreal Alouettes	L 35–42	4–5
7	10	Oct 8	at Montreal Alouettes	L 9–24	4–6
8	11	Oct 13	at Hamilton Tiger-Cats	L 24–40	4–7
9	12	Oct 20	vs. Toronto Argonauts	W 37–26	5–7
10	13	Oct 27	at Toronto Argonauts	W 17–15	6–7
11	14	Nov 3	vs. Hamilton Tiger-Cats	W 17–15	7–7

== Postseason ==
=== Playoffs ===
Round	Date	Opponent	Result	Record
East Semi-Final	Nov 7	at Hamilton Tiger-Cats	L 21–46	7–8
