= Chicago Winds =

Former American football team

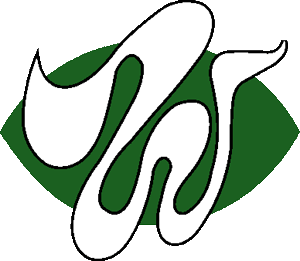
Logo

General information
- Founded: January 1975
- Folded: September 2, 1975
- Stadium: Soldier Field
- Headquartered: Chicago, Illinois
- Colours: Forest Green and White

Personnel
- Owner: Eugene Pullano
- General manager: Leo Cahill
- Head coach: Abe Gibron

League / conference affiliations
- World Football League; Western Division

The Chicago Winds was the World Football League's ill-fated 1975 successor to the Chicago Fire. The team was so named because Chicago was nicknamed "The Windy City." The Winds played at Soldier Field and the team was assigned to the WFL's Western Division for 1975 (the league having shrunk from 12 franchises to 11, and from three divisions to two).

== Pursuit of Joe Namath ==
Prior to the 1975 season opener, Winds owner Eugene Pullano attempted to sign New York Jets star quarterback Joe Namath to a contract. Namath, who had helped establish the credibility of the Jets and the old American Football League, was wavering about re-signing with New York after the 1974 season. Reports had him retiring, being traded to another NFL team — or jumping to the WFL, perhaps as a player/coach/co-owner. Namath's agent Jimmy Walsh asked the Winds for a $500,000 signing bonus, a three-year contract worth $600,000 a year, a $2 million annuity ($100,000 per year for 20 years) and terms for Namath's eventual ownership of a WFL franchise in New York. The Winds even dropped red from their team colors and went with just green and white to allow Namath to continue marketing his number 12 jersey in Jets colors.

When Eddie Einhorn, head of the WFL's television partner, TVS Television Network, got word that the upstart league was going after Namath, he bluntly told league president Chris Hemmeter that the WFL was literally betting its existence on getting Namath. Nearly all of TVS' affiliates refused to commit to air any WFL games in 1975 until Namath's signing was confirmed. According to Mark Kreigel's biography, Namath, Chicago apparently accepted the terms of the contract — until Walsh also demanded 15 percent of the WFL's total TV package. The Winds, perhaps somewhat counterintuitively (as 85% of television revenue for the league would have been better than having no TV revenue at all), rejected the deal. The Winds had all but promised that Namath would come to Chicago, and their failure to sign him made them and the league look foolish. Namath stayed with the Jets, and TVS dropped its coverage of the WFL, leaving the league without national television coverage in what proved to be its final season.

The team hired former Charlotte Hornets coach Babe Parilli (who coincidentally was Namath's backup with the Jets) as its new head coach and general manager. A number of old Fire players returned as well, including running backs Mark Kellar and Cyril Pinder, center Guy Murdock (the Fire's MVP), and receivers Steve Wright and Chuck Kogut. With Namath out of the picture, the Winds acquired veteran quarterback Pete Beathard from the Portland Storm, while wide receiver John Gilliam, who originally signed with The Hawaiians, also came to Chicago. Margene Adkins, a former Canadian Football League teenage star who at 28 was beginning to wear down from injury, was also a contributor to the Winds' offense; the Winds would be Adkins' last team before he retired from professional football.

== 1975 season ==
The Winds did not have much success on the field or at the box office. They lost both pre-season games, to Jacksonville (in front of only 2,627 at Soldier Field) and Charlotte (Parilli's old team). Unlike the defunct Chicago Fire, which sold 15,000 season tickets in 1974, the Winds managed only 1,600. In late July, the league took swift action by forcing Pulliano to fire Parilli. His replacement was Abe Gibron, who had been fired as head coach of the Chicago Bears after the 1974 season. (An amusing typo in an article in The New York Times indicated Gibron had become coach of the "Chicago Winos".) Leo Cahill left a (relatively) comfortable position as Memphis Southmen GM to the precarious situation with the wobbling Winds. Gibron was given only 48 hours or so to learn about his new team.

The Winds lost their first two regular-season contests, 10-0 in Birmingham and 38-18 in Shreveport, before beating the Portland Thunder, 25-18 in overtime; just 3,501 fans attended the contest, their last at Soldier Field. After two more road losses (at Hawaii and Memphis), the team was 1-4 and swimming in red ink.

Unlike the Fire games from the year before, Winds games were not broadcast on TV or radio. The public address announcer for the lone game in Chicago was Les Grobstein, who also worked with Eddie Ryan during Fire games.

=== Results ===
Key:	Win	Loss	Bye

Week	Day	Date	Opponent	Result	Venue	Attendance	Source
1	Sunday	August 2, 1975	at Birmingham Vulcans	L 0–10	Legion Field	31,000	
2	Sunday	August 9, 1975	at Shreveport Steamer	L 18–38	State Fair Stadium	10,611	
3	Sunday	August 16, 1975	Portland Thunder	W 25–18 ^{OT}	Soldier Field	3,470	
4	Sunday	August 23, 1975	at Hawaiians	L 17–28	Honolulu Stadium	10,313	
5	Sunday	August 30, 1975	at Memphis Grizzlies	L 7–31	Memphis Memorial Stadium	21,515	

== Dispute and Closing ==
Due to a dispute over partnership arrangements, two major investors withdrew $175,000 that they'd deposited with the league. (In a Sports Illustrated story on the death of the WFL, a Winds official referred to the investors as "Bob and Rich from California. I don't know their last names, but one's an Arab and the other's a Greek.")

The investors' withdrawal dropped the Winds below league capitalization requirements. Puliano asked for time to find more investors. However, on September 2, the league's owners voted 10-1 to expel Chicago from the league, with only the Winds themselves voting to continue. The owners were still reeling from the experience of the previous season, which saw many of the teams so badly underfinanced that they couldn't meet basic expenses. For this reason, they were not willing to give the Winds a second chance.

A team folding in mid-season was not unusual for the WFL (the Jacksonville Sharks and Detroit Wheels had died 14 games into a 20-game regular season in 1974), so the league was prepared. The Winds' game against the Southern California Sun was canceled. Since there were 11 teams, one had a bye each week; with Chicago out, the bye team simply took the Winds' place in the schedule. John Gilliam was selected by the Philadelphia Bell in a dispersal draft, but returned to the NFL Minnesota Vikings instead, much to the WFL's chagrin. Even this arrangement didn't last long. Due in part to the loss of national television revenue, the entire WFL only survived the Winds by a month, folding on October 22.
