= Frank Clair =

American football player, coach, and executive (1917–2005)

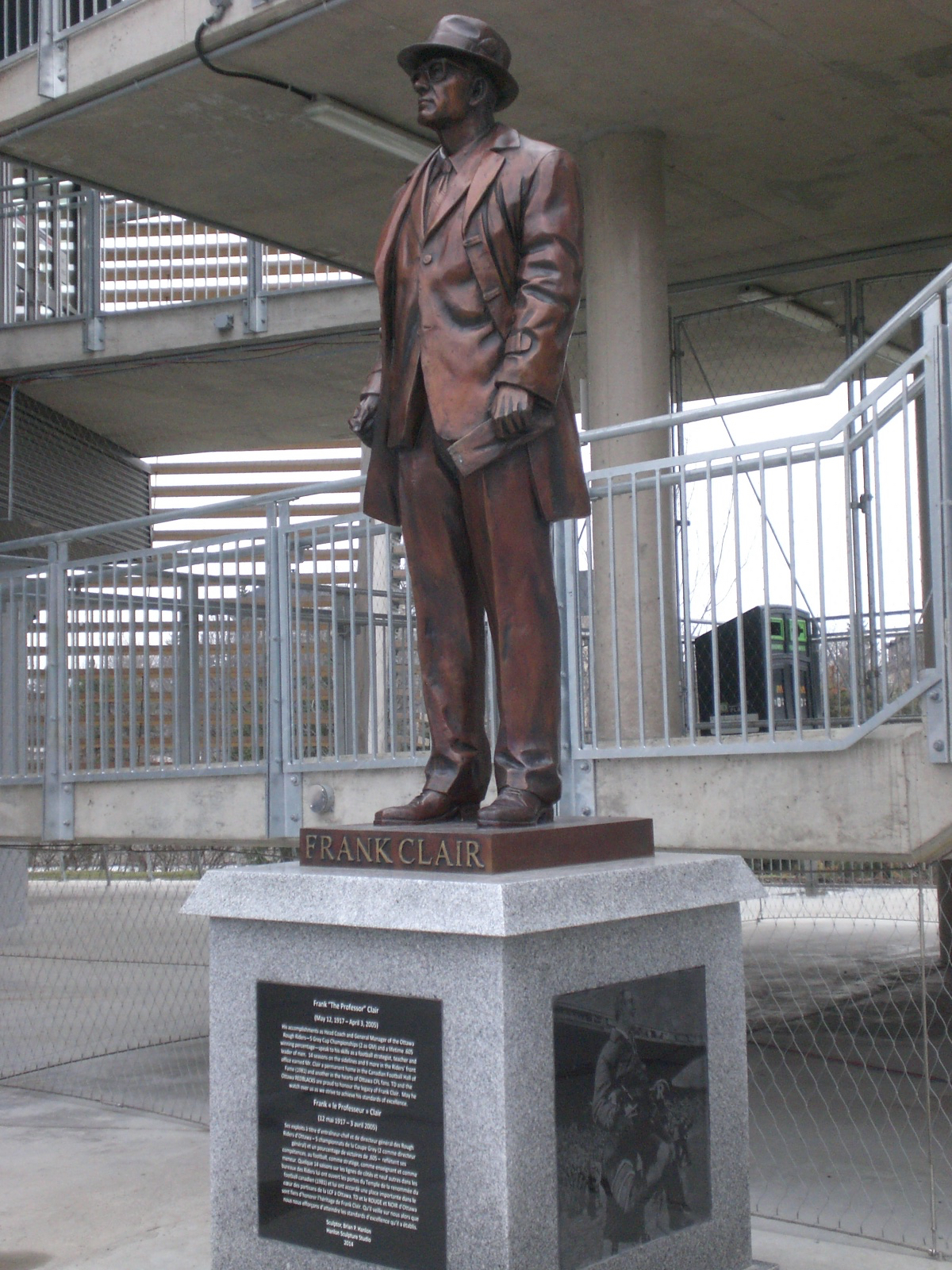
- Statue of Frank Clair in TD Place Stadium

Profile
- Position: End

Personal information
- Born: May 12, 1917; Hamilton, Ohio, U.S.
- Died: April 3, 2005 (aged 87); Sarasota, Florida, U.S.

Career information
- College: Ohio State

Career history

Playing
- 1941: Washington Redskins

Coaching
- 1946: Miami (OH) (assistant)
- 1947: Purdue (ends)
- 1948–1949: Buffalo
- 1950–1954: Toronto Argonauts
- 1956–1969: Ottawa Rough Riders

Operations
- 1970–1978: Ottawa Rough Riders

Awards and highlights
- 7× Grey Cup champion (1950, 1952, 1960, 1968, 1969, 1973, 1976); 2× Annis Stukus Trophy (1966, 1969)
- Canadian Football Hall of Fame (Class of 1981)

Frank James Clair (May 12, 1917 – April 3, 2005) was an American gridiron football player, coach, and executive. Nicknamed "the Professor" for his ability to recognize and develop talent, he served as a head coach in the Canadian Football League (CFL) with the Toronto Argonauts from 1950 to 1954 and the Ottawa Rough Riders from 1956 to 1969. Clair ranks third all-time in CFL history with 147 regular season wins and first in postseason victories with 27. He is also tied for the most Grey Cup championships won by a head coach with five. He won the Annis Stukus Trophy as the CFL's coach of the year in 1966 and 1969.

== Playing career ==
Clair played end for the Ohio State Buckeyes, lettering in 1938, 1939, and 1940. As a receiver, he was quarterback Don Scott's favorite target. In 1941, Clair played in seven games for the Washington Redskins.

== Coaching career ==
Clair found his greatest success in coaching. He was the head football coach at the University at Buffalo in 1948 and 1949. During the 1950s, he coached the Toronto Argonauts to two Grey Cups in 1950 and 1952.

In 1956, he joined the Ottawa Rough Riders. As coach, Clair led them to Grey Cup Championships in 1960, 1968 and 1969. After retiring from coaching following the 1969 season, became the team's general manager, where they won Grey Cups in 1973 and 1976. He was let go by the team in 1978. He was inducted into the Canadian Football Hall of Fame in 1981.

The stadium at Lansdowne Park was renamed Frank Clair Stadium in his honour on April 8, 1993. He was inducted into the Ontario Sports Hall of Fame in 1998. Clair lived in retirement at his home, and he died in Sarasota, Florida on April 3, 2005, In 2014, the stadium was renamed TD Place, and the operators erected a statue of Clair in his honour.

== Head coaching record ==
=== College ===
Year	Team	Overall	Conference	Standing	Bowl/playoffs
Buffalo Bulls (Independent) (1948–1949)
1948	Buffalo	6–1–1			
1949	Buffalo	6–3			
Buffalo:		12–4–1			
Total:		12–4–1			

=== CFL ===
Team	Year	Regular season					Postseason		
Team	Year	Won	Lost	Ties	Win %	Finish	Won	Lost	Result
TOR	1950	6	5	1	.542	2nd in IRFU	3	1	Won Grey Cup
TOR	1951	7	5	0	.583	3rd in IRFU	1	1	Lost in IRFU Semi-Finals
TOR	1952	7	4	1	.625	2nd in IRFU	4	1	Won Grey Cup
TOR	1953	5	9	0	.357	4th in IRFU	-	-	Missed playoffs
TOR	1954	6	8	0	.429	3rd in IRFU	-	-	Missed playoffs
TOR total		31	31	2	.500	0 East Division; Championships	8	3	2 Grey Cups
OTT	1956	7	7	0	.500	3rd in IRFU	0	1	Lost in Division Semi-Finals
OTT	1957	8	6	0	.571	2nd in IRFU	0	1	Lost in Division Semi-Finals
OTT	1958	6	8	0	.429	3rd in IRFU Division	1	2	Lost in Division Finals
OTT	1959	8	6	0	.571	2nd in East Division	2	1	Lost in Division Finals
OTT	1960	9	5	0	.643	2nd in East Division	4	0	Won Grey Cup
OTT	1961	8	6	0	.571	2nd in East Division	0	1	Lost in Division Semi-Finals
OTT	1962	6	7	1	.464	2nd in East Division	0	1	Lost in Division Semi-Finals
OTT	1963	9	5	0	.643	2nd in East Division	2	1	Lost in Division Finals
OTT	1964	8	5	1	.607	2nd in East Division	2	1	Lost in Division Finals
OTT	1965	7	7	0	.500	2nd in East Division	1	2	Lost in Division Finals
OTT	1966	11	3	0	.786	1st in East Division	2	1	Lost Grey Cup
OTT	1967	9	4	1	.679	2nd in East Division	1	2	Lost in Division Finals
OTT	1968	9	3	2	.714	1st in East Division	2	1	Won Grey Cup
OTT	1969	11	3	0	.786	1st in East Division	2	1	Won Grey Cup
OTT total		116	75	5	.605	3 East Division; Championships	19	16	3 Grey Cups
Total		147	106	7	.579	3 East Division; Championships	27	19	5 Grey Cups

== See also ==
- List of Canadian Football League head coaches by wins
