= 1968 BC Lions season =

Canadian football team season

- General manager: Denny Veitch
- Head coach: Jim Champion
- Home stadium: Empire Stadium

Results
- Record: 4–11–1
- Division place: 4th, West
- Playoffs: did not qualify

The 1968 BC Lions finished in fourth place in the Western Conference with a 4–11–1 record and continued to have an inept offense.

The Lions scored just 16 touchdowns all season. Finding the long-term replacement for Joe Kapp was difficult, and at one point, assistant coach Jackie Parker, a CFL legend who had retired in 1965, donned the pads for eight games at quarterback. Eventually, former Dallas Cowboys draft pick Paul Brothers won the starting quarterback job and would be the Lions pivot for the next three seasons.

The main brightspot was the Lions transitioning to a kicking specialist as their placekicker, Ted Gerela, accounted for 115 of the team's 217 points and hit 30 fieldgoals (at the time it was not only a CFL record, but a professional record). Another brightspot was rookie fullback Jim Evensen who rushed for 1220 yards and had 4 TDs.

The Lions played their first ever July regular season game as the league slowly transitioned as way from two games a week which were common place in the 1950s and early 1960s.

== Offseason ==
=== CFL draft ===
Round	Pick	Player	Position	School

== Preseason ==
Game	Date	Opponent	Results		Venue	Attendance
Game	Date	Opponent	Score	Record	Venue	Attendance

== Regular season ==
=== Season standings ===
Western Football Conference
Team	GP	W	L	T	PF	PA	Pts
Saskatchewan Roughriders	16	12	3	1	345	223	25
Calgary Stampeders	16	10	6	0	412	249	20
Edmonton Eskimos	16	8	7	1	228	288	17
BC Lions	16	4	11	1	217	318	9
Winnipeg Blue Bombers	16	3	13	0	210	374	6

=== Season schedule ===
Game	Date	Opponent	Results		Venue	Attendance
Game	Date	Opponent	Score	Record	Venue	Attendance
1	July 30	at Winnipeg Blue Bombers	W 18–16	1–0	Winnipeg Stadium	
2	Aug 6	vs. Calgary Stampeders	L 7–41	1–1	Empire Stadium	
3	Aug 15	vs. Edmonton Eskimos	L 17–18	1–2	Empire Stadium	
4	Aug 20	at Edmonton Eskimos	W 12–4	2–2	Clarke Stadium	
5	Aug 25	vs. Winnipeg Blue Bombers	L 10–17	2–3	Empire Stadium	
6	Sept 2	at Calgary Stampeders	L 6–26	2–4	McMahon Stadium	
7	Sept 7	vs. Saskatchewan Roughriders	L 8–14	2–5	Empire Stadium	
8	Sept 14	vs. Ottawa Rough Riders	T 22–22	2–5–1	Empire Stadium	
9	Sept 22	at Saskatchewan Roughriders	L 12–16	2–6–1	Taylor Field	
10	Sept 30	vs. Hamilton Tiger-Cats	L 13–16	2–7–1	Empire Stadium	
11	Oct 5	at Edmonton Eskimos	L 5–13	2–8–1	Clarke Stadium	
12	Oct 12	at Toronto Argonauts	L 29–43	2–9–1	Exhibition Stadium	
13	Oct 14	at Montreal Alouettes	W 13–4	3–9–1	Autostade	
14	Oct 19	vs. Winnipeg Blue Bombers	W 16–14	4–9–1	Empire Stadium	
15	Oct 26	at Calgary Stampeders	L 23–42	4–10–1	McMahon Stadium	
16	Nov 2	vs. Saskatchewan Roughriders	L 6–12	4–11–1	Empire Stadium	

=== Offensive leaders ===
Player	Passing yds	Rushing yds	Receiving yds	TD
Pete Ohler	1037	32	0	0
Jackie Parker	726	67	0	1
Paul Brothers	1001	96	0	1
Jim Evenson		1220	241	5
Jim Young		244	698	2
Lach Heron		0	452	1
Sonny Homer		0	415	4

== Awards and records ==
=== 1968 CFL All-Stars ===
None
