= Russ Jackson =

Canadian football player (born 1936)

Russ Jackson OC
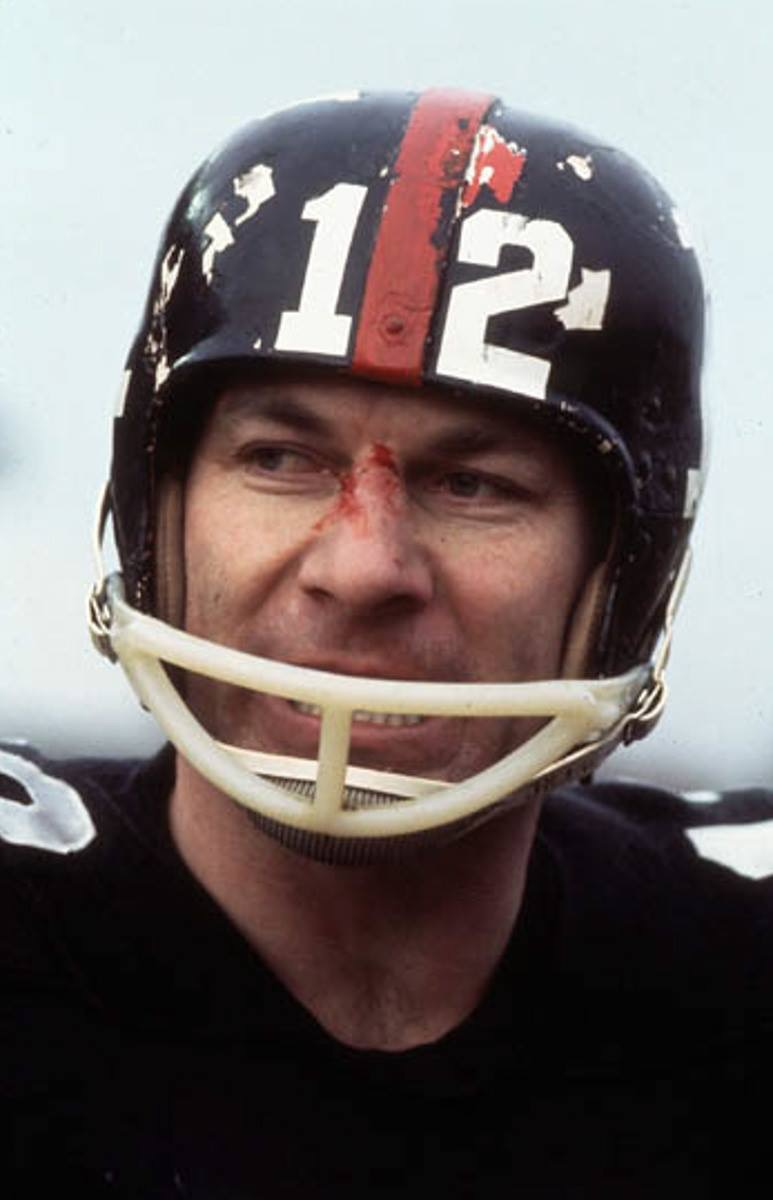
- Jackson with the Ottawa Rough Riders in 1969

No. 12
- Position: Quarterback

Personal information
- Born: July 28, 1936 (age 90); Hamilton, Ontario, Canada
- Listed height: 6 ft 0 in (1.83 m)
- Listed weight: 195 lb (88 kg)

Career information
- University: McMaster
- CFL draft: 1958: 1st round, 6th overall pick

Career history

Playing
- 1958–1969: Ottawa Rough Riders

Coaching
- 1975–1976: Toronto Argonauts (HC)

Awards and highlights
- 3× Grey Cup champion (1960, 1968, 1969); 2× Jeff Russel Memorial Trophy (1959, 1969); 4× Most Outstanding Canadian (1959, 1963, 1966, 1969); 3× CFL MOP (1963, 1966, 1969); Grey Cup MVP (1969); Lou Marsh Trophy (1969); 2× Lionel Conacher Award (1959, 1969); 3× CFL All-Star (1966, 1968, 1969); 6× CFL East All-Star (1962, 1963, 1966–1969); Ottawa Rough Riders #12 retired; Ottawa Redblacks #12 retired; Order of Canada (1970); Canada's Sports Hall of Fame (1975)
- Canadian Football Hall of Fame (Class of 1973)

Russell Stanley Jackson (born July 28, 1936) is a Canadian former professional football player. Jackson spent his entire 12-year professional football career with the Ottawa Rough Riders of the Canadian Football League (CFL). He is a member of the Order of Canada, the Canadian Football Hall of Fame, and Canada's Sports Hall of Fame, and has been described as the best Canadian-born quarterback to play in the CFL. In 2006, Jackson was voted one of the CFL's Top 50 players (#8) of the league's modern era by Canadian sports network TSN, the highest-ranked Canadian-born player on the list.

== Early life and university career ==
Jackson went to Westdale Secondary School in Hamilton, Ontario. After a stellar college career as both a basketball and football player, he graduated from McMaster University in 1958 with a Bachelor of Science degree in Mathematics. He was the McMaster nominee for a Rhodes Scholarship, but did not pursue an interview for the scholarship, deciding to play professionally.

== Professional career ==
Jackson was drafted in the first round, sixth overall, by the Ottawa Rough Riders in the 1958 CFL draft as a halfback. In his rookie year, he also played quarterback and eventually became the starter and led the Rough Riders to three Grey Cup victories (48th, 56th, and 57th Grey Cups).

Jackson was the dominant CFL quarterback of the 1960s. Referred to as the "Y. A. Tittle of the North", he was honoured many times during his CFL career. He won the CFL's Most Outstanding Player Award in the 1963, 1966, and 1969 seasons. He was also a four-time winner of the CFL's Most Outstanding Canadian Award (1959, 1963, 1966, 1969). He was a six-time Eastern Conference All-Star quarterback (1962, 1963, 1966–1969) and the CFL All-Star quarterback in the 1966, 1968, and 1969 seasons.

Russ Jackson was inducted into the Canadian Football Hall of Fame in 1973. Many consider him one of the best Canadian-born players to play in the CFL, while most consider him to be the best Canadian to play the quarterback position. In November 2006, Jackson was voted one of the CFL's top 50 players (No. 8) of the league's modern era by Canadian sports network TSN., the only Canadian-born player in the Top 10.

Jackson ended his career with 24,593 passing yards, with 1,356 completions on 2,530 attempts (53.6%), 124 interceptions, 185 touchdowns, and an efficiency rating of 91.2. He was also a mobile quarterback, gaining 5,045 yards on the ground on 738 rushes, with 54 touchdowns. Among the few Canadian-born quarterbacks to play in the CFL, Jackson is the one of two to pass for over 10,000 yards, as he was joined by Nathan Rourke in 2025.

He holds the record for throwing the most passing touchdowns in a Grey Cup game with four (set in the 1969 game) and highest career passer rating in Grey Cup games with 118.4.

Ottawa Journal sports editor Eddie MacCabe wrote a biography for Jackson's career in Ottawa, titled Profile of a Pro: The Russ Jackson Story and first published in 1969.

== Career statistics ==
		Passing								Rushing
Year	Team	Games	Att	Comp	Pct	Yards	TD	Int	Rating	Att	Yards	Avg	Long	TD
1958	OTT	14	112	61	54.5	858	3	6	66.0	66	357	5.4	51	5
1959	OTT	14	89	45	50.6	1,009	7	7	84.8	69	385	5.6	30	3
1960	OTT	12	52	20	38.5	322	2	3	40.7	52	381	7.3	25	6
1961	OTT	14	117	59	50.4	1,048	8	7	79.3	67	472	7.0	24	6
1962	OTT	14	157	78	49.7	1,427	10	13	68.1	71	512	7.2	26	8
1963	OTT	14	259	152	58.7	2,910	19	8	109.4	64	384	6.0	42	5
1964	OTT	14	230	116	50.4	2,156	18	16	80.3	81	588	7.3	33	3
1965	OTT	14	252	130	51.6	2,303	18	13	85.5	24	129	5.4	26	2
1966	OTT	14	276	142	51.4	2,400	17	15	79.1	65	396	6.1	26	3
1967	OTT	14	323	189	58.5	3,332	25	9	108.0	61	329	5.4	23	4
1968	OTT	14	305	171	56.1	3,187	25	16	97.8	54	534	9.9	73	6
1969	OTT	14	358	193	53.9	3,641	33	12	106.1	64	578	9.0	49	3
CFL totals		166	2,530	1,356	53.6	24,593	185	125	91.0	738	5,045	6.8	73	54

== Post-football playing career ==
=== Teaching ===
After retiring from football, Jackson returned to teaching, having been a mathematics teacher from 1959 to 1961 and head of the Department of Mathematics at Rideau High School in Ottawa, Ontario from 1961 to 1966. He was the principal of Canterbury High School in Ottawa from 1973 to 1975. He later became a vice-principal and principal at secondary schools in Ottawa and Mississauga. He also became principal at Brampton Centennial Secondary School, John Fraser and T.L. Kennedy secondary schools.

=== Broadcasting ===
Jackson served as colour commentator for the CFL on CBC broadcasts from 1971 to 1973 and again from 1977 to 1980. From 1996 to 2001, Jackson was the colour commentator for CHML-AM's coverage of the Hamilton Tiger-Cats.

=== Coaching ===
Jackson briefly left teaching in 1975, spending two years as head coach of the Toronto Argonauts. Jackson compiled a 12–18–2 regular season record in two seasons as the Argos' head coach, not reaching the playoffs in either season. Jackson was replaced by Leo Cahill, in his second tenure as the Argos' head coach, prior to the 1977 CFL season.

=== Honours ===
Jackson is an Officer of the Order of Canada and was awarded an honorary doctoral degree in law by McMaster University in 1989. He was added to Canada's Walk of Fame in 2012.

In 1986, the Russ Jackson Award was created in his honour to recognize the university football player who best exhibits athletic ability, academic achievement, and devoted citizenship.

Russ Jackson was inducted into the Ontario Sports Hall of Fame in 1995.
