= 1954 Calgary Stampeders season =

Canadian football team season

- Head coach: Larry Siemering
- Home stadium: Mewata Stadium

Results
- Record: 8–8
- Division place: 4th
- Playoffs: did not qualify

The 1954 Calgary Stampeders finished in fourth place in the W.I.F.U. with an 8–8 record and failed to make the playoffs.

== Regular season ==
=== Season standings ===
Western Interprovincial Football Union
Team	GP	W	L	T	PF	PA	Pts
Edmonton Eskimos	16	11	5	0	255	163	22
Saskatchewan Roughriders	16	10	4	2	239	204	22
Winnipeg Blue Bombers	16	8	6	2	202	190	18
Calgary Stampeders	16	8	8	0	271	165	16
BC Lions	16	1	15	0	100	345	2

=== Season schedule ===
Week	Game	Date	Opponent	Results		Venue	Attendance
Week	Game	Date	Opponent	Score	Record	Venue	Attendance
	1	Sat, Aug 21	at Winnipeg Blue Bombers	L 5–17	0–1	Winnipeg Stadium	17,000
	2	Mon, Aug 23	at Saskatchewan Roughriders	L 7–11	0–2	Taylor Field	11,469
	3	Sat, Aug 28	vs. Saskatchewan Roughriders	W 34–0	1–2	Mewata Stadium	14,000
	4	Mon, Aug 30	vs. Winnipeg Blue Bombers	W 41–0	2–2	Mewata Stadium	15,000
	5	Sat, Sept 4	vs. BC Lions	W 34–0	3–2	Mewata Stadium	15,000
	6	Sat, Sept 11	at Edmonton Eskimos	L 11–30	3–3	Clarke Stadium	18,795
	7	Mon, Sept 13	vs. Edmonton Eskimos	W 20–6	4–3	Mewata Stadium	15,090
	8	Sat, Sept 18	at BC Lions	L 4–9	4–4	Empire Stadium	18,786
	9	Sat, Sept 25	vs. Saskatchewan Roughriders	W 18–10	5–4	Mewata Stadium	15,000
	10	Mon, Sept 27	vs. Winnipeg Blue Bombers	L 4–6	5–5	Mewata Stadium	12,000
	11	Sat, Oct 2	vs. Edmonton Eskimos	L 12–13	5–6	Mewata Stadium	10,000
	12	Mon, Oct 4	at Edmonton Eskimos	L 6–21	5–7	Clarke Stadium	17,000
	13	Sat, Oct 9	at BC Lions	W 13–6	6–7	Empire Stadium	18,555
	14	Mon, Oct 11	vs. BC Lions	W 42–6	7–7	Mewata Stadium	12,500
	15	Sat, Oct 16	at Saskatchewan Roughriders	L 8–19	7–8	Taylor Field	14,000
	16	Mon, Oct 18	at Winnipeg Blue Bombers	W 12–11	8–8	Winnipeg Stadium	17,240

== Awards and records ==
- None
