= Jack Abendschan =

American gridiron football player (1942–2025)

No. 53
- Positions: Guard, Kicker

Personal information
- Born: December 18, 1942; San Francisco, California, U.S.
- Died: December 15, 2025 (aged 82); Lubbock, Texas, U.S.
- Listed height: 6 ft 2 in (1.88 m)
- Listed weight: 245 lb (111 kg)

Career information
- High school: Eunice (NM)
- College: New Mexico

Career history
- 1965–1975: Saskatchewan Roughriders

Awards and highlights
- Grey Cup champion (1966); 2× Dave Dryburgh Memorial Trophy (1969, 1970); 5× CFL All-Star (1967, 1969, 1971, 1972, 1973); 7× CFL West All-Star (1966, 1967, 1969–1973); Second-team All-American (1964)

Career CFL statistics
- Games played: 150
- Field goals made: 159
- Field goals attempted: 300
- Field goal %: 52.5
- Points scored: 875
- Longest field goal: 52
- Fumble recoveries: 2
- Canadian Football Hall of Fame (Class of 2012)

John Jacob Abendschan Jr. (December 18, 1942 – December 15, 2025) was an American professional football player who was an offensive lineman and placekicker for the Saskatchewan Roughriders of the Canadian Football League (CFL) from 1965 through 1975. He played college football for the New Mexico Lobos.

== Professional career ==
Jack Abendschan began his career with the Saskatchewan Roughriders in 1965 and remained with them throughout his 11-year CFL career. Abendschan played offensive guard and except for 1968, he played all 16 games of the regular season every year from 1965 to 1973.

Abendschan was also an accurate placekicker. His best field goal percentage was 63.2% (24 of 38) in 1970, his next best 60.7% (17 of 28) in 1967, considered very good for the era.

In 1968, Abendschan signed a contract with the Denver Broncos of the American Football League (AFL) but did not make the roster and he resumed his CFL career.

Abendschan was part of the 54th Grey Cup championship-winning Saskatchewan Roughriders in 1966 over the Ottawa Rough Riders 29–14, in which he converted their 4 touchdowns. He also played in the 55th Grey Cup the following year, the 57th Grey Cup of 1969, and the 60th Grey Cup of 1972, losses to the Hamilton Tiger-Cats in 1967 and 1972 and to Ottawa in 1969.

During Abendschan's time as a member of the Saskatchewan Roughriders, he was named to the CFL's All-Star team 5 times. In 2012, he was inducted into the Canadian Football Hall of Fame.

== Death ==
Abendschan died in Lubbock, Texas on December 15, 2025, at the age of 82.

== Videos ==
- Canadian Football Hall of Fame member on YouTube
- Seen in game 3 of the 1970 Western Conference finals in its entirety on YouTube
