= 1968 Toronto Argonauts season =

CFL team season

- Head coach: Leo Cahill
- Home stadium: Exhibition Stadium

Results
- Record: 9–5
- Division place: 2nd, East
- Playoffs: Lost Eastern Finals

The 1968 Toronto Argonauts finished in second place in the Eastern Conference with a 9–5 record. They appeared in the Eastern Finals.

== Preseason ==
Game	Date	Opponent	Results		Venue	Attendance
Game	Date	Opponent	Score	Record	Venue	Attendance
A	Wed, July 10	vs. Winnipeg Blue Bombers	W 35–1	1–0	Exhibition Stadium	20,784
B	Thu, July 18	vs. Hamilton Tiger-Cats	W 35–23	2–0	Exhibition Stadium	22,023
B	Mon, July 22	at Calgary Stampeders	L 21–24	2–1	McMahon Stadium	
C	Wed, July 24	at BC Lions	L 7–46	2–2	Empire Stadium	21,995

== Regular season ==
=== Standings ===
Eastern Football Conference
Team	GP	W	L	T	PF	PA	Pts
Ottawa Rough Riders	14	11	3	0	399	298	22
Toronto Argonauts	14	9	5	0	406	280	20
Hamilton Tiger-Cats	14	8	5	1	307	315	17
Montreal Alouettes	14	2	10	2	304	395	6

=== Schedule ===
Week	Game	Date	Opponent	Results		Venue	Attendance
Week	Game	Date	Opponent	Score	Record	Venue	Attendance
1	1	Fri, Aug 2	vs. Edmonton Eskimos	W 32–4	1–0	Exhibition Stadium	26,236
2	2	Fri, Aug 9	vs. Ottawa Rough Riders	L 14–38	1–1	Exhibition Stadium	33,052
3	Bye						
4	3	Wed, Aug 21	at Calgary Stampeders	W 19–7	2–1	McMahon Stadium	23,380
4	4	Sun, Aug 25	at Saskatchewan Roughriders	L 17–32	2–2	Taylor Field	20,336
5	5	Mon, Sept 2	at Hamilton Tiger-Cats	W 18–15	3–2	Civic Stadium	27,153
6	6	Sun, Sept 8	vs. Hamilton Tiger-Cats	L 6–20	3–3	Exhibition Stadium	33,135
7	7	Sun, Sept 15	at Montreal Alouettes	W 23–8	4–3	Autostade	27,214
8	8	Sun, Sept 22	vs. Montreal Alouettes	W 37–16	5–3	Exhibition Stadium	30,303
9	9	Sun, Sept 29	at Winnipeg Blue Bombers	W 15–9	6–3	Winnipeg Stadium	17,012
10	10	Sun, Oct 6	at Ottawa Rough Riders	L 10–31	6–4	Lansdowne Park	23,454
11	11	Sat, Oct 12	vs. BC Lions	W 43–29	7–4	Exhibition Stadium	22,373
12	12	Sun, Oct 20	vs. Montreal Alouettes	W 29–25	8–4	Exhibition Stadium	21,142
13	13	Sun, Oct 27	at Hamilton Tiger-Cats	W 12–1	9–4	Civic Stadium	24,206
14	14	Sun, Nov 3	vs. Ottawa Rough Riders	L 9–31	9–5	Exhibition Stadium	33,135

== Postseason ==
Round	Date	Opponent	Results		Venue	Attendance
Round	Date	Opponent	Score	Record	Venue	Attendance
East Semi-Final	Sat, Nov 9	vs. Hamilton Tiger-Cats	W 33–21	1–0	Exhibition Stadium	25,723
East Final Game 1	Sun, Nov 17	vs. Ottawa Rough Riders	W 13–11	2–0	Exhibition Stadium	32,304
East Final Game 2	Sat, Nov 23	at Ottawa Rough Riders	L 14–36	2–1	Landsdowne Park	25,085

== Awards and honours ==
Bill Symons – CFL Most Outstanding Player, 1107 yds rushing (This was the first time a Toronto Argonaut had been so honored.)
