= 1953 Toronto Argonauts season =

CFL team season

- Head coach: Frank Clair
- Home stadium: Varsity Stadium

Results
- Record: 5–9
- Division place: 4th, IRFU
- Playoffs: did not qualify

The 1953 Toronto Argonauts finished in fourth place in the Interprovincial Rugby Football Union with a 5–9 record and failed to make the playoffs.

== Regular season ==
=== Standings ===
Interprovincial Rugby Football Union
Team	GP	W	L	T	PF	PA	Pts
Montreal Alouettes	14	8	6	0	292	229	16
Hamilton Tiger-Cats	14	8	6	0	229	243	16
Ottawa Rough Riders	14	7	7	0	266	238	14
Toronto Argonauts	14	5	9	0	172	249	10

=== Schedule ===
Week	Date	Opponent	Location	Final score	Attendance	Record
1	August 26	Alouettes	Varsity Stadium	W 11–9	18,500	1–0–0
2	September 2	@ Alouettes	Delorimier Stadium	L 15–7	13,276	1–1–0
2	September 7	@ Tiger-Cats	Civic Stadium	L 14–12	17,000	1–2–0
3	September 12	Rough Riders	Varsity Stadium	L 20–16	17,459	1–3–0
4	September 16	@ Tiger-Cats	Civic Stadium	W 21–20	14,000	2–3–0
4	September 19	Tiger-Cats	Varsity Stadium	L 12–9	20,382	2–4–0
5	September 26	@ Rough Riders	Lansdowne Park	W 18–17	16,000	3–4–0
6	Bye					
7	October 10	Tiger-Cats	Varsity Stadium	L 26–0	19,150	3–5–0
7	October 12	@ Tiger-Cats	Civic Stadium	W 30–12	19,069	4–5–0
8	October 18	@ Alouettes	Delorimier Stadium	L 39–11	19,603	4–6–0
9	October 24	Tiger-Cats	Varsity Stadium	W 17–5		5–6–0
10	October 31	Rough Riders	Varsity Stadium	L 20–8	20,187	5–7–0
11	November 7	@ Rough Riders	Lansdowne Park	L 13–4		5–8–0
12	November 14	Alouettes	Varsity Stadium	L 27–8	16,153	5–9–0
