= Skip Walker =

American football player (1954–2022)

No. 32, 33
- Position: Running back

Personal information
- Born: September 11, 1954; Houston, Texas, U.S.
- Died: April 13, 2022 (aged 67)
- Listed height: 5 ft 9 in (1.75 m)
- Listed weight: 191 lb (87 kg)

Career information
- High school: Del Valle (TX)
- College: Texas A&M
- NFL draft: 1976: 11th round, 311th overall pick

Career history
- 1976: Houston Oilers*
- 1978: Toronto Argonauts*
- 1979: Montreal Alouettes*
- 1979–1980: Saskatchewan Roughriders*
- 1980–1981: Montreal Alouettes
- 1982–1984: Ottawa Rough Riders
- 1985: Green Bay Packers*
- * Offseason or practice squad member only

Awards and highlights
- 2× CFL rushing yards leader (1982–1983); 2× CFL All-Star (1982, 1983); 3× CFL East All-Star (1980, 1982, 1983); All-SWC (1972); Second-team All-SWC (1973)

Alvin Ray "Skip" Walker (September 11, 1954 – April 13, 2022) was an American professional football player who was a running back for five seasons in the Canadian Football League (CFL) for the Montreal Alouettes and Ottawa Rough Riders, including two seasons where he led the CFL in rushing yards in 1982 and 1983. He was named a CFL All Star in 1982 and 1983, and a CFL East All-Star in 1980, 1982 and 1983. He played college football for the Texas A&M Aggies and was selected in the 11th round of the 1976 NFL draft by the Houston Oilers. He also spent time with the Toronto Argonauts, Saskatchewan Roughriders, and Green Bay Packers.

== Early life and education ==
Walker was born on September 11, 1954, in Houston, Texas. He attended Del Valle High School in Travis County, Texas, where he competed in football, track, and basketball. His coach Tom Walker described him as "the best athlete I've ever coached." In football, Walker averaged over 100 yards per game.

Walker committed to Texas A&M University in February 1972. As a freshman, Walker started in eight games for the Texas A&M football team, and placed third in rushing with 78 carries for 311 yards and three touchdowns. In a 45–10 win over SMU as a sophomore, Walker ran for 181 yards and scored two touchdowns. He finished the year with 98 rushes, 618 rushing yards and 8 touchdowns, as well as 10 receptions for 233 yards; he was named all-conference by the Fort Worth Star-Telegram.

In the third game of his junior year, Walker scored three touchdowns and ran for 53 yards in a win over Washington. Two weeks later, against Texas Tech, he compiled 181 rushing yards on 21 carries and scored three touchdowns in the second quarter alone. By week six, he had become the conference's leading rusher, with teammate Bubba Bean in second place. He finished the season with 98 rushing attempts for 550 yards and 8 touchdowns. He also recorded 2 receptions for 73 yards and 1 touchdown. He was named honorable mention All-Southwest Conference (SWC) by United Press International.

As a senior, Walker helped Texas A&M start off 10–0 and finish as conference co-champions with a record of 10–2. He ended the season with 97 rushing attempts for 399 yards and four touchdowns, while also recording 6 receptions for 171 yards and 1 touchdown. He finished his college career with 371 rushing attempts for 1,878 yards and 23 touchdowns while also recording 24 receptions for 523 yards and 2 touchdowns.

Walker was nicknamed "Skip." "My dad was a military man and called us by names like Captain, Chief, Skipper etc. The name Skip was used frequently for me. When Texas A&M Coach Emory Bellard recruited me and came to the house, he heard my folks calling me Skip so when I got to university, Coach Bellard called me Skip from day one. In fact, the name on the back of my jersey was "S. Walker." The rest is history," he said.

== Professional career ==
After graduating, Walker was selected in the 11th round (311th overall) of the 1976 NFL draft by the Houston Oilers. His contract with the Oilers was negotiated by his father, as he did not hire an agent. He was released in training camp. While a free agent, Walker was a football coach and teacher at Levi Fry Junior High School in Texas City, Texas, while continuing to work out.

In 1978, Walker briefly had a stint with the Toronto Argonauts of the Canadian Football League (CFL), but did not make the final roster.

In 1979, Walker was signed by the Montreal Alouettes of the CFL, but was released on the final day before the regular season began. He was picked up on waivers by the Saskatchewan Roughriders but was not activated and later released. In 1980, he was re-signed by the Roughriders. In June, he was traded back to Montreal by Saskatchewan, where he made the final roster. In the second game of the season, Walker averaged 18.8 yards per rush with five carries for 94 yards and made eight catches for 86 yards in a loss to the Calgary Stampeders. In week four against his former team, the Saskatchewan Roughriders, Walker recorded 22 rushes for 96 yards and scored his team's only touchdown in the 18–10 win. On October 12, in a win over the Ottawa Rough Riders, he scored two touchdowns and ran for 85 yards on 15 carries. In the Eastern Semi-Final playoff game against Ottawa, Walker scored the game-winning touchdown in the fourth quarter and also scored on a 73-yard touchdown run. The Alouettes lost in the Eastern Finals to the Hamilton Tiger-Cats, and Walker finished the year with 114 rushes for 692 yards and nine touchdowns. He also recorded 34 receptions for 511 yards and one touchdown, and made 17 kickoff returns for 434 yards. He was named to the 1980 CFL East All-Star team.

Overall, in 1981, Walker had a very limited role due to the signing of David Overstreet, who became starter and was given most of the carries. Walker recorded just 54 rushing yards on the year, scoring no touchdowns. Receiving, he made 11 catches for 116 yards with a long of 32. He also returned four kickoffs for 77 yards.

On July 3, 1982, Walker was acquired by the Ottawa Rough Riders in a trade. He played his first game with Ottawa on July 17 against the Hamilton Tiger-Cats, after being ruled out for the first game of the year. He was described as the "only really lively offensive performer" in the 14–20 loss to Hamilton, gaining 90 yards and scoring on an 18-yard pass play. In the following week against the Montreal Concordes, Walker caught three passes for 112 yards in a 55–5 win, scoring on a 96-yard touchdown pass, the longest offensive play of his career. By the third game of the season, he had made 34 carries and gained 194 rushing yards, 200 receiving yards, and scored four touchdowns. By the end of week eight, he had the CFL lead in rushing yards with 401. In a loss to the Edmonton Eskimos in week nine, Walker recorded 15 rushes for 105 yards and was described as Ottawa's "lone bright spot." Walker scored two touchdowns and made 97 yards rushing, 128 yards receiving in a win over the Saskatchewan Roughriders on September 24. By week 11, he led the CFL in touchdowns with 11, placed second in the league in rushing and made 23 pass receptions for 417 yards. In a win over the Calgary Stampeders on October 23, Walker ran 27 times for 203 yards and scored four touchdowns, becoming the first CFL player of the season to achieve 1,000 rushing yards. He scored two touchdowns and ran for 113 yards in a 34–32 win the following week against the Montreal Concordes, clinching a playoff spot for Ottawa while eliminating the Concordes. Walker finished the regular season as the league's leading rusher and touchdown scorer, earning a spot on the CFL All-Star team and CFL East All-Star team. In the Eastern Semi-Final playoff game against the Hamilton Tiger-Cats, he "ran like no running back in Canadian Football League playoff history," gaining 253 rushing yards (the highest playoff total and third-highest ever) on 30 carries and scoring one touchdown in a 30–20 win. Despite him running for 87 yards and scoring a touchdown in the Eastern Final playoff game against the Toronto Argonauts, the Rough Riders lost 7–44. He finished the season with 210 rushing attempts for 1,141 yards and 13 touchdowns, while making 28 catches for 536 yards and five touchdowns. He also returned 13 kickoffs for 288 yards.

In January 1983, Walker signed a four-year contract extension with the Rough Riders. He recorded 111 rushing yards on 15 carries and scored two touchdowns in the first game of the season, a 26–25 win over the Winnipeg Blue Bombers. Trailing 9–13 in week three against the Calgary Stampeders, Ottawa coach George Brancato called up Walker for a trick play at the Stampeders' 24 yard line. Rather than run the ball, Walker received the hand-off and attempted to pass. However, Calgary realized the trick play and put him under heavy pressure, leading him to throw an interception to defensive back Terry Irvin. The Stampeders scored on their next drive and Ottawa was not able to come back, eventually losing 16–27. He finished the game with 182 rushing yards, nearly 100 more than the total of the two Calgary starters at running back. In a week six loss to the Toronto Argonauts, Walker was "smothered by aggressive Toronto defenders almost every time he was given the ball" and had negative-one yards rushing, although he did score one touchdown. After a five-game losing streak, the Rough Riders recorded their second win of the season the following week, 17–14 against the Edmonton Eskimos, with Walker recording 94 rushing yards and 27 receiving yards.

By the end of the Rough Riders' seventh game, Walker had the league lead in rushing yards with 587, had five of the team's 11 touchdowns, and had made 14 catches for 157 yards. In their eighth game, a 49–19 win over the BC Lions, Walker made 11 rushes and gained 167 yards, a 15-yard average. In the first half alone of the next game, a loss by one point to the Saskatchewan Roughriders, he made 91 yards. He scored one touchdown and gained 106 rushing yards in a win over the Hamilton Tiger-Cats in the following game. One week later, Walker surpassed 1,000 yards rushing in a win over the Saskatchewan Roughriders. After going down 11–21 versus the Calgary Stampeders, Walker returned a kickoff 97 yards for a touchdown in one of the longest plays of his career. He also ran for 108 yards in the game, a 29–24 win. For his performance, he was named CFL Offensive Star of the Week. On October 23, in a 20–19 win over Toronto, Walker ran for 145 yards and scored two touchdowns, including the game-winner with seconds left to play. He finished the season with 1,431 rushing yards and 10 touchdowns, leading the league and being named to the CFL All-Star team and CFL East All-Star team. Walker also made 28 receptions for 317 yards and 19 kickoff returns for 489 yards. His 1,431 rushing yards were an Ottawa record that stood until 1991, when it was broken by Reggie Barnes in an 18-game season (the season Walker played in was 16 games). Ottawa was upset in the Eastern Semi-Final playoff game against the Hamilton Tiger-Cats, 31–33, with Walker running for 118 yards on 11 rushes in the game.

Walker missed the first game of the 1984 season due to an ankle injury. He came back for their game with the Calgary Stampeders, but only gained 53 yards on 20 carries. In a week four win over the Montreal Concordes, Walker suffered a broken ankle that kept him out for most of the season. Tim McCray, his replacement, performed so well that the Rough Riders didn't activate Walker until a while after he was healthy, although the rest of the team did not perform well, winning none of their first seven games after his injury. When finally activated, he had a very limited role, with McCray having taken the starting position. Walker finished the season with just 256 rushing yards on 69 carries, scoring only one touchdown as the Rough Riders finished 4–12 and missed the playoffs.

Walker was waived by the Rough Riders in May 1985. He ended his CFL career with 648 rushing attempts, 3,574 rushing yards and 33 touchdowns. He also recorded 114 receptions for 1,625 yards and 7 touchdowns. As a kick returner, he returned 53 kicks for 1,288 return yards and 1 touchdown. He was later signed by the Green Bay Packers in the National Football League but was released in late July. He subsequently retired.

== Later life and death ==
After retiring from football, Walker returned to Austin, Texas, where he opened a restaurant named Hoover's and became a coach at Reagan High School. Walker died of cancer on April 13, 2022, at the age of 67.
