= 1954 BC Lions season =

Canadian football team season

- Head coach: Annis Stukus
- Home stadium: Empire Stadium

Results
- Record: 1–15
- Division place: 5th, W.I.F.U.
- Playoffs: did not qualify

Uniform

The 1954 BC Lions season was the inaugural season for the Lions. By Bailey scored the first touchdown in BC Lions history in an 8–6 loss to Winnipeg on August 28, 1954.

The first win in franchise history (and the only win of the season) came on September 18, 1954, when the Lions defeated the Calgary Stampeders 9–4 at Empire Stadium in Vancouver.

The Lions finished the season with a 1–15 record and failed to make the playoffs.

== Preseason ==
Game	Date	Opponent	Results		Venue	Attendance
Game	Date	Opponent	Score	Record	Venue	Attendance
A	Wed, Aug 11	vs. Montreal Alouettes	L 0–22	0–1	Empire Stadium	19,371
B	Wed, Aug 18	vs. Hamilton Tiger-Cats	L 0–12	0–2	Empire Stadium	10,000

== Regular season ==
=== Season standings ===
Western Interprovincial Football Union
Team	GP	W	L	T	PF	PA	Pts
Edmonton Eskimos	16	11	5	0	255	163	22
Saskatchewan Roughriders	16	10	4	2	239	204	22
Winnipeg Blue Bombers	16	8	6	2	202	190	18
Calgary Stampeders	16	8	8	0	271	165	16
BC Lions	16	1	15	0	100	345	2

=== Season schedule ===
Week	Game	Date	Opponent	Results		Venue	Attendance
Week	Game	Date	Opponent	Score	Record	Venue	Attendance
1	1	Sat, Aug 28	vs. Winnipeg Blue Bombers	L 6–8	0–1	Empire Stadium	20,606
1	2	Mon, Aug 30	vs. Saskatchewan Roughriders	L 0–17	0–2	Empire Stadium	14,878
2	3	Sat, Sept 4	at Calgary Stampeders	L 0–34	0–3	Mewata Stadium	15,000
2	4	Mon, Sept 6	at Edmonton Eskimos	L 6–12	0–4	Clarke Stadium	18,000
3	5	Sat, Sept 11	at Saskatchewan Roughriders	L 7–17	0–5	Taylor Field	13,000
3	6	Mon, Sept 13	at Winnipeg Blue Bombers	L 17–22	0–6	Winnipeg Stadium	16,760
4	7	Sat, Sept 18	vs. Calgary Stampeders	W 9–4	1–6	Empire Stadium	18,786
4	8	Mon, Sept 20	vs. Edmonton Eskimos	L 13–23	1–7	Empire Stadium	21,186
5	9	Sat, Oct 2	at Saskatchewan Roughriders	L 12–43	1–8	Taylor Field	12,000
5	10	Mon, Oct 4	at Winnipeg Blue Bombers	L 6–24	1–9	Winnipeg Stadium	15,273
6	11	Sat, Oct 9	vs. Calgary Stampeders	L 6–13	1–10	Empire Stadium	18,555
6	12	Mon, Oct 11	at Calgary Stampeders	L 6–42	1–11	Mewata Stadium	12,500
7	13	Sat, Oct 16	at Edmonton Eskimos	L 3–31	1–12	Clarke Stadium	15,000
7	14	Mon, Oct 18	vs. Edmonton Eskimos	L 0–22	1–13	Empire Stadium	13,136
8	15	Sat, Oct 23	vs. Winnipeg Blue Bombers	L 0–18	1–14	Empire Stadium	17,061
8	16	Mon, Oct 25	vs. Saskatchewan Roughriders	L 9–15	1–15	Empire Stadium	10,775

== 1954 Canadian Football Awards ==
None
