= Don Ettinger =

American gridiron football player (1921–1992)

No. 74, 40, 55
- Positions: Linebacker, guard

Personal information
- Born: November 20, 1921; Independence, Missouri, U.S.
- Died: February 13, 1992 (aged 69); Cookeville, Tennessee, U.S.
- Listed height: 6 ft 2 in (1.88 m)
- Listed weight: 240 lb (109 kg)

Career information
- High school: William Chrisman (Independence)
- College: Kansas
- NFL draft: 1948: 19th round, 166th overall pick

Career history
- New York Giants (1948–1950); Saskatchewan Roughriders (1951); Toronto Argonauts (1952–1953); Hamilton Tiger-Cats (1954)

Awards and highlights
- Grey Cup (40th); 4× Canadian All-Star (1951–1954)

Career NFL statistics
- Games played: 33
- Games started: 8
- Interceptions: 4
- Fumble recoveries: 3
- Stats at Pro Football Reference

Donald Nesbit Ettinger (November 20, 1921 – February 13, 1992) was an American professional football player. He was born in Independence, Missouri. Nicknamed "Red Dog", Ettinger played college football for the University of Kansas and later the National Football League (NFL)'s New York Giants. He finished his career in Canadian football, where he was a four-time All-Star and won the 40th Grey Cup.

Ettinger is credited for inventing the blitz. As of the 2025 NFL season, he is the only player from William Chrisman High School to play in the NFL.
