= Alan Ford (Canadian football) =

Canadian football player (born 1943)

No. 21
- Position: Defensive back Punter

Personal information
- Born: July 2, 1943 (age 83); Saskatoon, Saskatchewan, Canada

Career history

Playing
- 1965–1976: Saskatchewan Roughriders

Operations
- 1989–1999: Saskatchewan Roughriders (General Manager)
- 2003: Hamilton Tiger-Cats (Interim General Manager)

Awards and highlights
- Grey Cup champion (1966, 1989)

Alan Ford (born July 2, 1943) is a Canadian former professional football player and executive. Currently he is a scout for the Montreal Alouettes. He played as defensive back and punter from 1965 to 1976 for the Saskatchewan Roughriders of the Canadian Football League, and acted as Roughriders general manager from 1989 to 1999.

He helped the Roughriders win the 1966 Grey Cup, and place second in 1967, in which he made the longest punt in Grey Cup history.

He has been an executive for the Roughriders and the Hamilton Tiger-Cats, winning the 1989 Grey Cup with the Roughriders as general manager (GM). In the late-2000s, Ford acted as a scout for the Montreal Alouettes.

Ford's grandson, Jaxon Ford, was drafted by the Saskatchewan Roughriders in the 2023 CFL National Draft.
