= 1959 Ottawa Rough Riders season =

Canadian football team season

- Owner: Sam Berger
- Head coach: Frank Clair
- Home stadium: Lansdowne Park

Results
- Record: 8–6
- Division place: 2nd, IRFU
- Playoffs: Lost East Finals

The 1959 Ottawa Rough Riders finished in second place in the Interprovincial Rugby Football Union with an 8–6 record but lost to the Hamilton Tiger-Cats in the East Finals.

== Preseason ==
Game	Date	Opponent	Results	
Game	Date	Opponent	Score	Record
B	July 30	vs. BC Lions	W 24–22	1–0
B	Aug 3	at Edmonton Eskimos	L 7–20	1–1
C	Aug 6	at BC Lions	L 14–35	2–1

== Regular season ==
=== Standings ===
Interprovincial Rugby Football Union
Team	GP	W	L	T	PF	PA	Pts
Hamilton Tiger-Cats	14	10	4	0	298	162	20
Ottawa Rough Riders	14	8	6	0	275	217	16
Montreal Alouettes	14	6	8	0	193	305	12
Toronto Argonauts	14	4	10	0	192	274	8

=== Schedule ===
Week	Game	Date	Opponent	Results	
Week	Game	Date	Opponent	Score	Record
1	1	Aug 18	vs. Toronto Argonauts	L 20–21	0–1
1	2	Aug 21	at Montreal Alouettes	L 8–23	0–2
2	3	Aug 29	at Hamilton Tiger-Cats	L 10–34	0–3
3	4	Sept 5	vs. Montreal Alouettes	L 7–22	0–4
4	5	Sept 13	at Toronto Argonauts	L 6–19	0–5
5	6	Sept 16	vs. Toronto Argonauts	W 28–1	1–5
5	7	Sept 19	at Montreal Alouettes	W 43–6	2–5
6	8	Sept 26	vs. Hamilton Tiger-Cats	L 14–23	2–6
7	9	Oct 3	at Hamilton Tiger-Cats	W 9–7	3–6
8	10	Oct 10	vs. Montreal Alouettes	W 36–8	4–6
8	11	Oct 12	at Montreal Alouettes	W 28–12	5–6
9	12	Oct 17	vs. Hamilton Tiger-Cats	W 17–16	6–6
10	13	Oct 24	vs. Toronto Argonauts	W 18–4	7–6
11	14	Oct 31	at Toronto Argonauts	W 31–21	8–6

== Postseason ==
=== Playoffs ===
Round	Date	Opponent	Results	
Round	Date	Opponent	Score	Record
East Semi-Final	Nov 7	vs. Montreal Alouettes	W 43–0	1–0
East Final #1	Nov 14	vs. Hamilton Tiger-Cats	W 17–5	2–0
East Final #2	Nov 21	at Hamilton Tiger-Cats	L 7–21	2–1
