= Jim Letcavits =

American gridiron football player (1935–2015)

Profile
- Position: Wide receiver

Personal information
- Born: December 1, 1935; Massillon, Ohio, U.S.
- Died: February 3, 2015 (aged 79); Massillon, Ohio, U.S.
- Listed height: 6 ft 2 in (1.88 m)
- Listed weight: 205 lb (93 kg)

Career information
- High school: Massillon Washington
- College: Kansas

Career history
- 1958–1962: Edmonton Eskimos
- 1963: Montreal Alouettes

Awards and highlights
- First-team All-Big Eight (1957); Second-team All-Big Seven (1956)

James Lee Letcavits (December 1, 1935 – February 3, 2015) was an American professional football player who played for the Edmonton Eskimos and Montreal Alouettes. He played college football at the University of Kansas and also played for the Massillon Tigers. In 2004, he was diagnosed with Alzheimer's disease. He died in 2015.
