= Bill Sowalski =

Canadian football player (1930-1969)

Profile
- Positions: End, Halfback

Personal information
- Born: c. 1930; Fort Frances, Ontario, Canada
- Died: November 15, 1969 (aged 38–39); Ottawa, Ontario, Canada
- Listed height: 6 ft 0 in (1.83 m)
- Listed weight: 215 lb (98 kg)

Career history
- 1954–1962: Ottawa Rough Riders

Awards and highlights
- Grey Cup champion (1960)

Bill Sowalski (c. 1930 - November 15, 1969) was a Canadian professional football player who played for the Ottawa Rough Riders. He won the Grey Cup with them in 1960.

Sowalski died aged 38-39 on November 15th, 1969 in Ottawa.
