= Art Green (running back) =

American gridiron football player (born 1946)

Profile
- Position: Running back

Personal information
- Born: September 18, 1946 (age 80); Atlanta, Georgia, U.S.
- Listed height: 6 ft 0 in (1.83 m)
- Listed weight: 200 lb (91 kg)

Career information
- College: Albany State

Career history
- 1972: New Orleans Saints
- 1973–1978: Ottawa Rough Riders

Awards and highlights
- 2× Grey Cup champion (1973, 1976); 2× CFL All-Star (1975, 1976); 3× CFL East All-Star (1974, 1975, 1976)

Art Green (born September 18, 1946) is a former all-star and Grey Cup champion running back in the Canadian Football League and the National Football League.

A graduate of Albany State University, Green played 7 games with the New Orleans Saints in 1972 before his season ended with a serious knee injury. He then came to Canada for an all-star career. In 1973, he joined the Ottawa Rough Riders for 7 games and helped them win the Grey Cup. In 1974, he was an eastern all-star, and in 1975 he rushed for 1188 yards and was a CFL all star. 1976 was a career year, with 1257 yards rushing and another thrilling victory in the classic Grey Cup game. After trying out, unsuccessfully, with the NFL in 1977, he played one last year in Ottawa.
