= 1954 Toronto Argonauts season =

CFL team season

- Head coach: Frank Clair
- Home stadium: Varsity Stadium

Results
- Record: 6–8
- Division place: 3rd, IRFU
- Playoffs: did not qualify

The 1954 Toronto Argonauts finished in third place in the Interprovincial Rugby Football Union with a 6–8 record and failed to make the playoffs.

== Regular season ==
=== Standings ===
Interprovincial Rugby Football Union
Team	GP	W	L	T	PF	PA	Pts
Montreal Alouettes	14	11	3	0	341	148	22
Hamilton Tiger-Cats	14	9	5	0	275	207	18
Toronto Argonauts	14	6	8	0	212	265	12
Ottawa Rough Riders	14	2	12	0	129	337	4

=== Schedule ===
Week	Date	Opponent	Result	Record	Venue	Attendance
1	Aug 28	Ottawa Rough Riders	W 13–6	1–0	Varsity Stadium	16,702
2	Sept 4	Hamilton Tiger-Cats	L 6–17	1–1	Varsity Stadium	14,747
2	Sept 6	at Hamilton Tiger-Cats	W 21–7	2–1	Civic Stadium	14,000
3	Sept 11	Ottawa Rough Riders	L 5–12	2–2	Varsity Stadium	13,910
4	Sept 18	at Ottawa Rough Riders	W 34–6	3–2	Lansdowne Park	12,000
5	Sept 25	at Montreal Alouettes	L 7–28	3–3	Molson Stadium	18,104
6	Oct 2	Montreal Alouettes	L 12–30	3–4	Varsity Stadium	20,700
7	Oct 9	at Hamilton Tiger-Cats	L 6–34	3–5	Civic Stadium	13,000
7	Oct 11	Hamilton Tiger-Cats	L 13–22	3–6	Varsity Stadium	16,050
8	Oct 16	at Ottawa Rough Riders	W 27–11	4–6	Lansdowne Park	8,809
9	Oct 23	Montreal Alouettes	W 30–24	5–6	Varsity Stadium	16,401
10	Oct 30	at Montreal Alouettes	L 13–41	5–7	Molson Stadium	19,125
11	Nov 6	Ottawa Rough Riders	W 18–12	6–7	Varsity Stadium	11,273
12	Nov 13	at Hamilton Tiger-Cats	L 7–15	6–8	Civic Stadium	9,000
