= 48th Grey Cup =

1960 Canadian Football championship game

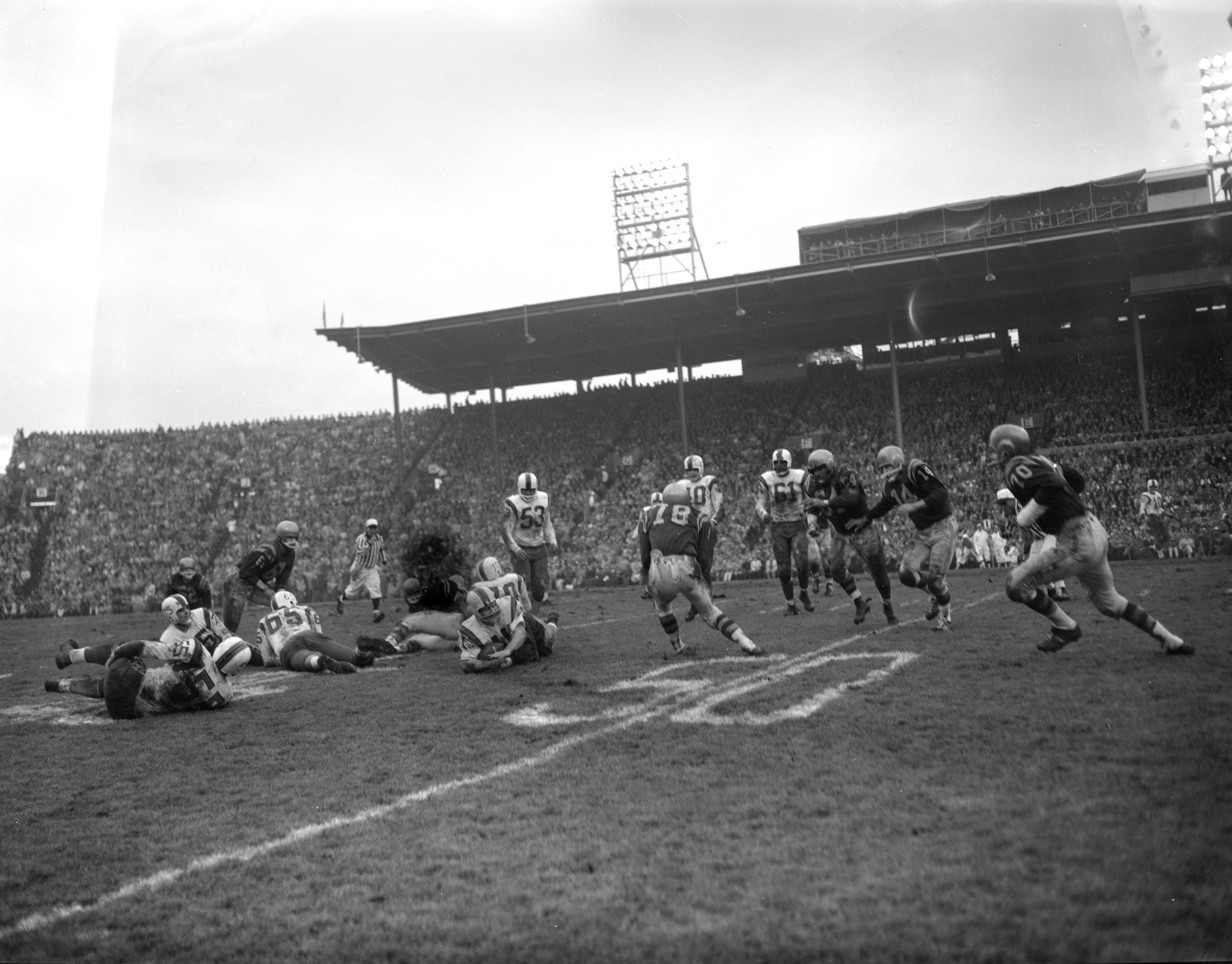
Ottawa Rough Riders	Edmonton Eskimos
(9–5)	(10–6)
16	6
Head coach: Frank Clair	Head coach: Eagle Keys
	1	2	3	4	Total
Ottawa Rough Riders	3	6	0	7	16
Edmonton Eskimos	0	6	0	0	6
- Date: November 26, 1960
- Stadium: Empire Stadium
- Location: Vancouver
- Most Valuable Player: Ron Stewart, RB (Rough Riders)
- Referee: Seymour Wilson
- Attendance: 38,102

Broadcasters
- Network: CBC, SRC

The 48th Grey Cup was the Canadian Football League's (CFL) championship game of the 1960 season on November 26, 1960.

The Ottawa Rough Riders defeated the Edmonton Eskimos 16–6 at Vancouver's Empire Stadium before a crowd of 38,102 fans.

== Box Score ==
First quarter

Ottawa – FG – Gary Schreider 16 yards

Second quarter

Edmonton – TD – Jim Letcavits 63 yard pass from Jackie Parker (convert failed)
Ottawa – TD – Bill Sowalski 32 yard pass from Russ Jackson (convert failed)

Third quarter

No Scoring

Fourth quarter

Ottawa – TD – Kaye Vaughan fumble recovery (Gary Schreider convert)

Teams	1 Q	2 Q	3 Q	4 Q	Final
Ottawa Rough Riders	3	6	0	7	16
Edmonton Eskimos	0	6	0	0	6

== Game summary ==
The Empire Stadium field was slippery and favoured the defences.

Ottawa scored in the first quarter with a Gary Schreider 16-yard field goal.

In the second quarter, Edmonton quarterback Jackie Parker passed to Jim Letcavits for a 63-yard touchdown. The Ottawa defender attempted to make the interception but Letcavits took the ball away from him and ran untouched into the end zone. The convert attempt failed.

Ottawa replied on the next series with a 72-yard drive. On the Eskimo 32-yard line, Ottawa quarterback Russ Jackson faked a hand-off and rolled to the weak side on a bootleg. Jackson found Bill Sowalski for a touchdown. Schreider missed the convert.

In the fourth quarter, Edmonton punt returner Joe Bob Smith fumbled on his own two-yard line after being hit by Lou Bruce. Ottawa's Kaye Vaughan recovered the ball as it rolled into the end zone. Schreider converted the score.

Parker ran back the ensuing kickoff 74 yards, but Edmonton could not take advantage.

With 41 seconds left to play and the Rough Riders facing a second-and-seven from their own 33-yard line, a fan raced across the field and stole the game ball. Simultaneously, fans had rushed the field and began ripping down the goal posts. After a brief conference and on the advice of CFL commissioner Sydney Halter, the officials called the game.

Ottawa running back Ron Stewart was named the game's Most Valuable Player. Edmonton finished the game with only 44 yards rushing. It was Ottawa's first Grey Cup appearance and victory since 1951. Kaye Vaughan's fumble recovery touchdown was his first touchdown in 14 years of football.

== Videos ==
Jackson TD pass to Sowalski
