= 40th Grey Cup =

1952 Canadian Football championship game

Toronto Argonauts	Edmonton Eskimos
(7–4–1)	(9–6–1)
21	11
Head coach: Frank Clair	Head coach: Frank Filchock
	1	2	3	4	Total
Toronto Argonauts	0	15	0	6	21
Edmonton Eskimos	5	0	6	0	11
- Date: 29 November 1952
- Stadium: Varsity Stadium
- Location: Toronto
- Kick-off: C. D. Howe
- Attendance: 27,391

Broadcasters
- Network: CBC - only on CBLT Toronto
- Announcers: Norm Marshall, Larry O'Brien
- Ratings: 700,000 (estimated)

The 40th Grey Cup game was the Canadian football Championship held on 29 November 1952. The Toronto Argonauts defeated the Edmonton Eskimos 21–11 at Toronto's Varsity Stadium.

== Game highlights ==
An audience of 27,391 watched as acting Canadian Prime Minister C. D. Howe opened the game with a ceremonial football kickoff, where Edmonton Mayor William Hawrelak held the ball, and Toronto Mayor Allan Lamport was watching nearby.

Hometown coach Frank Clair and his team enjoyed a decisive victory despite trailing in the first quarter. Edmonton coach Frank Filchock was dismissed soon after his team's defeat.

First quarter: Normie Kwong earned a touchdown for Edmonton at the 13:05 mark, the only score of the first quarter.

Second quarter: Toronto took the lead when it earned six points from a touchdown by Nobby Wirkowski at 3:06, and a conversion by Red Ettinger, who would score again that quarter with a 3-point field goal at 11:35. Billy Bass earned Toronto's second touchdown of the quarter at 13:28, converted again by Ettinger. Edmonton was left scoreless in this quarter which ended with a 15-5 Toronto lead.

Third quarter: Kwong's second touchdown of the game occurred at 10:24 and converted by Bill Snyder, the only points recorded in this quarter. Toronto continued to lead 15-11.

Fourth quarter: Edmonton was shut out in the final quarter as Toronto's Zeke O'Connor touched down at 9:40, followed by a conversion from Ettinger.

== Grey Cup's first telecast ==
This was the first Grey Cup match to be televised as CBC Television's Toronto flagship station, CBLT, paid CAD$7,500 to the Canadian Rugby Union for the rights to broadcast the game. The broadcast was only available locally on CBLT which had only begun broadcasts less than three months earlier. Live network television connections with other CBC stations were not available until 1953, although kinescope films of the game were produced for movie theatres and other television stations.

A technical failure prevented viewers from seeing 29 minutes of the game video. This interrupted the telecast during much of the third quarter, although commentator audio was still transmitted. Images were restored into the final quarter when CBC technicians repaired the link at the CBC's tower which received the feed from Varsity Stadium. The reported cause of the transmission relay failure was a vacuum tube worth $1.85. Despite this setback, this inaugural Grey Cup broadcast was reported to have had the most viewers of any Canadian television production to that date.
