= Joe Bob Smith =

Canadian football player (1934–2011)

Profile
- Position: Halfback

Personal information
- Born: October 27, 1934; Quitman, Texas, US
- Died: December 18, 2011 (aged 77); Mineola, Texas, US
- Listed height: 6 ft 0 in (1.83 m)
- Listed weight: 190 lb (86 kg)

Career information
- College: Houston
- NFL draft: 1957: 28th round, 335th overall pick

Career history
- 1958–1961: Edmonton Eskimos

Joe Bob Smith (October 27, 1934 – December 18, 2011) was an American-born Canadian football player who played for the Edmonton Eskimos. He previously played football at the University of Houston.
