= Reggie Barnes (running back) =

American gridiron football player (born 1967)

Profile
- Position: Running back

Personal information
- Born: October 19, 1967 (age 59); Philadelphia, Pennsylvania, U.S.

Career information
- High school: West Philadelphia
- College: Delaware State

Career history
- 1990–1993: Ottawa Rough Riders
- 1994: Shreveport Pirates
- 1994: Hamilton Tiger-Cats
- 1995: Toronto Argonauts
- 1996: Ottawa Rough Riders

Awards and highlights
- CFL's Most Outstanding Rookie Award (1990)

Reggie Barnes (born October 19, 1967) is a former running back in the Canadian Football League.

Barnes attended the Delaware State University where he rushed for 1336 yards in 1988 and 3282 during his college career. He was not drafted by the NFL, but signed as a free agent with the New York Jets in 1989 where he spent the entire season on the practice squad.

He came to Canada in 1990, and made an immediate impression on the Ottawa Rough Riders. He rushed for 1260 yards and 5 touchdowns on his way to winning the CFL's Most Outstanding Rookie Award. Interestingly, CFL legend and Ottawa quarterback Damon Allen also rushed for 1,000 yards that year. Barnes went on to prove his ability, setting a team rushing record, posting an incredible 1,486 yards rushing in 1991 and 10 rushing touchdowns, ottawa finished 7-11 that year. Barnes also played with Shreveport Pirates, Hamilton Tiger-Cats and Toronto Argonauts but ended his career in 1996 with Ottawa the last season for the Rough Riders.
