= 57th Grey Cup =

1969 Canadian Football championship game

Ottawa Rough Riders	Saskatchewan Roughriders
(11–3)	(13–3)
29	11
Head coach: Frank Clair	Head coach: Eagle Keys
	1	2	3	4	Total
Ottawa Rough Riders	0	14	7	8	29
Saskatchewan Roughriders	9	0	2	0	11
- Date: November 30, 1969
- Stadium: Autostade
- Location: Montreal
- Most Valuable Player: Russ Jackson, QB (Rough Riders)
- Attendance: 33,172

Broadcasters
- Network: CBC, CTV, SRC

57th Grey Cup, the Canadian Football League's championship game, was played November 30, 1969, and the Ottawa Rough Riders defeated the Saskatchewan Roughriders 29–11 before 33,172 fans at Montreal's Autostade. It was the first time since 1931, a break of 38 years, that the CFL title match would be played in Montreal.

The game is the focus of the "Playing a Dangerous Game" episode in TSN's 2012 documentary series Engraved on a Nation celebrating the 100th Grey Cup game. Concerns about ongoing FLQ separatist terrorist bombing activities in Quebec prompted the CFL and Montreal authorities to have police officers in full riot gear securing the stadium and Prime Minister Pierre Trudeau. However, no incidents occurred during the course of the weekend.

This was the first Grey Cup game played in its entirety on a Sunday; all Grey Cup games since this one (except for 1970) have been played on a Sunday.

== Box Score ==
First quarter

Saskatchewan – TD – Alan Ford 27 yard pass from Ron Lancaster (Jack Abendschan convert)
Saskatchewan – Safety – Bill Van Burkleo conceded

Second quarter

Ottawa – TD – Jay Roberts 11 yard pass from Russ Jackson (Don Sutherin convert)
Ottawa – TD – Ron Stewart 80 yard pass from Russ Jackson (Don Sutherin convert)

Third quarter

Saskatchewan – Single – Alan Ford
Saskatchewan – Single – Jack Abendschan
Ottawa – TD – Jim Mankins 11 yard pass from Russ Jackson (Don Sutherin convert)

Fourth quarter

Ottawa – Single – Don Sutherin
Ottawa – TD – Ron Stewart 32 yard pass from Russ Jackson (Don Sutherin convert)

Teams	1 Q	2 Q	3 Q	4 Q	Final
Ottawa Rough Riders	0	14	7	8	29
Saskatchewan Roughriders	9	0	2	0	11

== Game summary ==
The game's first score resulted from a fumble by Ottawa's punter Bill Van Burkleo after he slipped in a muddy area of the field. George Reed recovered on the Ottawa's 31 yard line. Saskatchewan got the touchdown when Ron Lancaster passed to Alan Ford from the 27 yard line. Van Burkleo conceded a safety to add to the Saskatchewan lead.

On Ottawa's first touchdown drive in the second quarter Jackson ran the ball up the middle for 18 yards. Another short run of his own set up an 11-yard pass to Jay Roberts, who broke through a couple of tacklers for the score.

Saskatchewan was given great field position again on a 78-yard kickoff return by Alan Ford. But Ottawa's Don Sutherin recovered a George Reed fumble on the Ottawa 30 yard line, ending the threat.

Wayne Shaw managed to tip one Jackson pass to Ron Stewart, but he was able to catch the ball behind a wall of blockers before getting into the open for an 80-yard score.

With Ottawa leading 14-11 in the third quarter, the Green Riders fumbled a kick and Dan Dever recovered the ball for Ottawa on the Saskatchewan 27. Ed McQuarters appeared to have Jackson tackled for a loss, but Jackson dodged the tackle, rolled to his left, and hit Jim Mankins just over the goal line for another touchdown.

Ottawa scored their fourth touchdown in the fourth quarter. Just before Jackson was driven to the ground by Cliff Shaw, he managed to flip the ball to Stewart, who ran 32 yards for his second TD.

== Records, Awards, and Landmarks ==
Ottawa quarterback Russ Jackson set a record for throwing the most passing touchdowns in a Grey Cup game, four. This was Jackson's final regular game. He came out of retirement to play in the July 2, 1970, Ottawa-vs.-CFL All-Stars game. He completed 3 of 8 passes, with his last pass as a professional being intercepted.

This was the only Grey Cup game played at the Autostade. When Montreal next hosted the game in 1977, it was at Olympic Stadium.

== Videos ==
- Entire game on YouTube

== 1969 Miss Grey Cup ==
Team Nominees
Miss BC Lions	Judy Ireland
Miss Calgary Stampeders	Cathy Savage
Miss Edmonton Eskimos	Barbara Barchard
Miss Hamilton Tiger-Cats	Cathy McKeen
Miss Montreal Alouettes	Pamela Davidson
Miss Ottawa Rough Riders	Pamela Whiting
Miss Saskatchewan Roughriders	Laura Medland
Miss Toronto Argonauts	Robin Keeler
Miss Winnipeg Blue Bombers	Jean Wills

- Miss Saskatchewan Roughriders Laura Medland was named Miss Grey Cup 1969, with Miss Hamilton Tiger-Cats Cathy McKeen the first runner-up, and Miss Ottawa Rough Riders Pamela Whiting the second runner-up. The 19-year-old Medland received a new 1970 Pontiac, a two-week vacation in Mexico, and other prizes.
- Judy Ireland, Miss BC Lions, was named Miss Congeniality.
- Gordon Lightfoot performed a 20-minute set at the Miss Grey Cup Gala at the Queen Elizabeth Hotel in Montreal. Lightfoot remarked, "doing 20 minutes of this can be a lot harder than two hours before the usual sort of young audience.".
