= 56th Grey Cup =

1968 Canadian Football championship game

Ottawa Rough Riders	Calgary Stampeders
(9–3–2)	(10–6)
24	21
Head coach: Frank Clair	Head coach: Jerry Williams
	1	2	3	4	Total
Ottawa Rough Riders	1	3	7	13	24
Calgary Stampeders	0	14	0	7	21
- Date: November 30, 1968
- Stadium: CNE Stadium
- Location: Toronto
- Most Valuable Player: Vic Washington, RB (Rough Riders)
- Attendance: 32,655

Broadcasters
- Network: CBC, CTV, SRC

The 56th Grey Cup was played on November 30, 1968, and the Ottawa Rough Riders defeated the Calgary Stampeders 24–21 before 32,655 fans at Toronto's CNE Stadium. Vic Washington's 79-yard run is still a Grey Cup record, and he won the Grey Cup Most Valuable Player award. This was the final Grey Cup game to be played on a Saturday; beginning the next year and since then (except for 1970), all Grey Cup games have been played on a Sunday.

== Box score ==
First quarter

Ottawa – Single – Ron Stewart punt blocked by Ottawa, recovered in the end zone by Ted Woods

Second quarter

Ottawa – FG – Don Sutherin 27-yard field goal
Calgary – TD – Peter Liske 1-yard run (Larry Robinson convert)
Calgary – TD – Terry Evanshen 21-yard pass from Peter Liske (Larry Robinson convert)

Third quarter

Ottawa – TD – Russ Jackson 1-yard run (Don Sutherin convert)

Fourth quarter

Ottawa – TD – Vic Washington 79-yard run (convert blocked)
Ottawa – TD – Margene Adkins 70-yard pass from Russ Jackson (Don Sutherin convert)
Calgary – TD – Terry Evanshen 4-yard pass from Peter Liske (Larry Robinson convert)

Teams	1 Q	2 Q	3 Q	4 Q	Final
Ottawa Rough Riders	1	3	7	13	24
Calgary Stampeders	0	14	0	7	21

== 1968 Miss Grey Cup ==
Team nominees
Miss BC Lions	Valerie Bryan
Miss Calgary Stampeders	Patricia Cooper
Miss Edmonton Eskimos	Barbara Casault
Miss Hamilton Tiger-Cats	Kathy Cumming
Miss Montreal Alouettes	Lynn Jessop
Miss Ottawa Rough Riders	Lee Donaldson
Miss Saskatchewan Roughriders	Donna Hardy
Miss Toronto Argonauts	Jacquie Perrin
Miss Winnipeg Blue Bombers	Diane Zuk

- Miss Edmonton Eskimos Barbara Casault was named Miss Grey Cup 1968, with Miss Toronto Argonauts Jacquie Perrin the first runner-up, and Miss Hamilton Tiger-Cats Kathy Cumming the second runner-up. A second-year education student at the University of Alberta, she received a new 1969 convertible, a trip for two to Mexico, a mink stole, a movie camera and a diamond watch set. Each contestant received $1,500 in prizes. Casault's prizes were worth $15,000, with those for the first-runner up worth $2,700 and the second runner-up worth $2,200.
- Miss Saskatchewan Roughriders Donna Hardy was chosen the inaugural Miss Personality Plus by the other contestants.
- Selection of Miss Grey Cup was done on the basis of personality and poise (30 points), carriage and figure (15 points), make-up and grooming (10 points), speech and projection (10 points), cheerleader costume (10 points) and overall impression (10 points).
