= Len Cassidy =

Canadian football player (1919–2007)

Profile
- Position: End

Personal information
- Born: November 18, 1919
- Died: January 30, 2007 (aged 87); Fenelon Falls, Ontario, Canada
- Listed height: 5 ft 10 in (1.78 m)
- Listed weight: 160 lb (73 kg)

Career history
- 1946–1948: Toronto Argonauts
- 1951: Saskatchewan Roughriders

Awards and highlights
- Grey Cup champion (1945, 1946, 1947)

Leonard Irving Cassidy (November 18, 1919 – January 30, 2007) was a Canadian professional football player who played for the Toronto Argonauts. He won the Grey Cup with Toronto in 1945, 1946 and 1947.
