= Rudy Singer =

Canadian football player (1924–2007)

Profile
- Position: Guard

Personal information
- Born: 1924
- Died: August 18, 2007 (aged 83); Calgary, Alberta, Canada
- Listed height: 5 ft 7 in (1.70 m)
- Listed weight: 175 lb (79 kg)

Career history
- 1947–1949: Calgary Stampeders

Awards and highlights
- Grey Cup champion (1948)

Rudolph Martin Singer (1924 – August 18, 2007) was a Canadian professional football player who played for the Calgary Stampeders. He won the Grey Cup with them in 1948. Pullar previously played football for the Regina Royal Canadian Navy team. He was a veteran of World War II and later worked as an electrician. Singer died of cancer in 2007.
