= Gerry Woodlock =

Canadian football player (1923–2002)

Profile
- Position: Guard

Personal information
- Born: 1923
- Died: January 2002 (aged 78)
- Listed height: 6 ft 1 in (1.85 m)
- Listed weight: 185 lb (84 kg)

Career history
- 1946–1947: Calgary Stampeders
- 1949: Edmonton Eskimos

Gerald Francis Joseph Woodlock (1923 – January 2002) was a Canadian football player who played for the Edmonton Eskimos and Calgary Stampeders. He previously played junior football in Calgary.
