= Bud Irving =

Canadian football player (1926–2024)

No. 42, 29, 15
- Position: Guard

Personal information
- Born: May 2, 1926; Winnipeg, Manitoba, Canada
- Died: September 7, 2024 (aged 98); Winnipeg, Manitoba, Canada
- Listed height: 5 ft 11 in (1.80 m)
- Listed weight: 178 lb (81 kg)

Career information
- High school: Kelvin (MN)

Career history
- 1945–1950: Winnipeg Blue Bombers

Awards and highlights
- Western All-Star (1948, 1949)

Harold "Bud" Kemp Irving (May 2, 1926 – September 7, 2024) was a Canadian professional football guard who played six seasons in the Western Interprovincial Football Union (WIFU) (now Canadian Football League (CFL) West Division) for the Winnipeg Blue Bombers. An attendee of Kelvin High School, Irving skipped college at a chance to play professional football.

== Early life and education ==
Harold "Bud" Irving was born in Winnipeg on May 2, 1926. He attended Kelvin High School in Winnipeg, Manitoba, graduating in 1945. He was later inducted into the school's hall of fame. Irving skipped college at the chance to play professional football in the Western Interprovincial Football Union (WIFU) (now CFL West Division) for the Winnipeg Blue Bombers.

== Professional career ==
As a rookie, Irving helped his team make the 33rd Grey Cup; however, they lost 0–35 against the Toronto Argonauts. He appeared in all eight games during the 1946 season, starting seven and helping his team reach the championship for the second consecutive year. Their second championship also ended in defeat, as the Argonauts again were victorious. In his third season, Irving again appeared in every game, but only started five of them. For the third straight season, Winnipeg made the Grey Cup, but again lost to the Argonauts, this time by a score of 9–10. With an expanded schedule in 1948, Irving started nine games as the Blue Bombers finished with a 3–9 record. Despite missing several games, he was named to the league's all-star team, tied with Bert Iannone. He also scored his only career touchdown in 1948, on a fumble return.

He was a starter in all fourteen games in the 1949 season, earning second-team all-Western honors as the Blue Bombers finished with a 2–12 record. By the start of the 1950 season, Irving was the last member of Winnipeg who had played in one of their Grey Cups. He appeared in all fourteen games in the season, helping the team compile a record of 10–4. They eventually made it to the 38th Grey Cup, but lost for the fourth time to the Toronto Argonauts.

== Later life ==
Following the loss, Irving retired, with plans to complete a law course at University of Manitoba. He said, "I'm not getting the same kick out of football now, so I guess it's time to pull out." After getting a degree from Manitoba, Irving became an official of junior and intermediate football games. He later became an official in the Canadian Football League (CFL), retiring after officiating the 48th Grey Cup in 1960.

Irving died in Winnipeg on September 7, 2024, at the age of 98. At the time of his death, Irving was believed to be the oldest living Blue Bomber, and one of the oldest former Canadian football players.
