= Doug Smylie =

Canadian football player

Profile
- Position: FW

Personal information
- Born: June 3, 1922; Toronto, Ontario, Canada
- Died: March 19, 1983 (aged 60); Toronto, Ontario, Canada
- Listed height: 6 ft 1 in (1.85 m)
- Listed weight: 190 lb (86 kg)

Career history
- 1945: Toronto Argonauts
- 1946: Montreal Alouettes
- 1948: Ottawa Rough Riders
- 1949–1953: Toronto Argonauts

Awards and highlights
- Grey Cup champion (1945, 1952)

Douglas John Smylie (June 3, 1922 – March 19, 1983) was a Canadian professional football player who played for the Toronto Argonauts, Montreal Alouettes and Ottawa Rough Riders. He won the Grey Cup with Toronto in 1945 and 1952. The son of Rod Smylie, a player and Stanley Cup winner for the Toronto St. Patricks. Previously played football for and attended Cornell University.

Douglas married Constance Fellowes August 23, 1947.
