= Ken Sluman =

Profile
- Position: End

Personal information
- Born: May 15, 1924
- Died: July 21, 1991 (aged 67); Kingston, Ontario, Canada
- Listed height: 6 ft 2 in (1.88 m)
- Listed weight: 190 lb (86 kg)

Career history
- 1946–1947: Calgary Stampeders
- 1949–1950: Edmonton Eskimos

Awards and highlights
- CFL West All-Star (1947)

Ken Sluman (May 15, 1924 – July 21, 1991) was a Canadian football player who played for the Edmonton Eskimos and Calgary Stampeders.
