= William Ernest Cummer =

Canadian dentist (1879–1942)

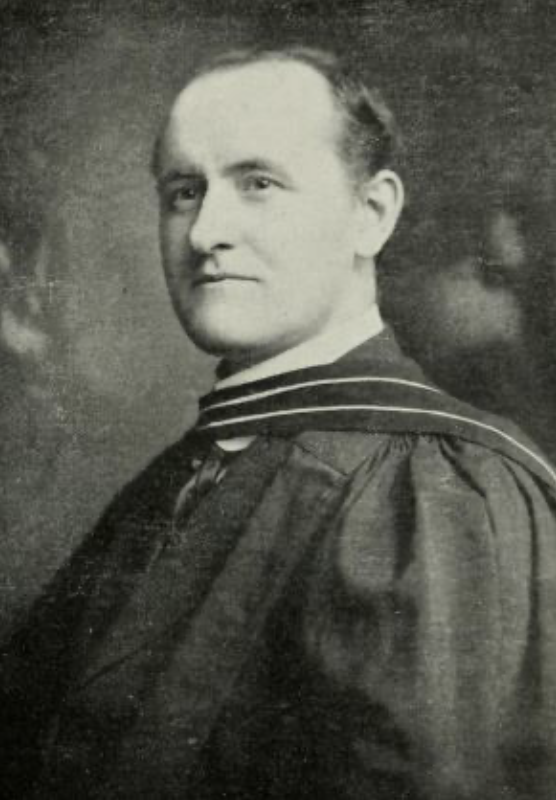
- Born: December 4, 1879; Hamilton, Ontario, Canada
- Died: May 14, 1942 (aged 62); Toronto, Ontario, Canada
- Occupation: Dentist

William Ernest Cummer was a Canadian dentist. He was the chair of prosthetic dentistry at the Royal College of Dental Surgeons and the Dean of the Dental Faculty at the University of Detroit. He served as a major in the Dental Corps during World War 2, and later became a Priest.

== Dental career ==
After graduating from the Royal College of Dental Surgeons of Ontario at the University of Toronto in 1902, he became involved in both teaching and institutional development. He served as faculty librarian of the University of Toronto Dentistry Library from 1906 to 1910. during this period, he modernized and significantly expanded the dental library's holdings,. He also compiled and distributed a comprehensive catalogue of texts to students, faculty, and practicing dentists across Ontario, helping to standardize professional knowledge and improve access to current research.

Cummer's academic influence continued to grow in the following decades. He played a key role in shaping the curriculum at the Royal College, advocating for the introduction of a pre-dental program that incorporated engineering principles—an innovation that better prepared students for the technical demands of modern dentistry. In 1926, he was appointed chair of prosthetic dentistry. His research and publications on partial denture construction were widely regarded as pioneering, and his work helped establish foundational principles that remained influential in prosthodontics for years to come.

In addition to his academic and clinical work, Cummer was an active contributor to professional discourse. He served as associate editor of Oral Health from 1917 to 1931 and delivered more than 100 lectures across Canada, the United States, and Europe, including in Rome. His expertise extended to the use of restorative dental appliances in treating facial bone injuries, a skill he applied during World War I while serving as a Major in the Dental Corps.

By the early 1930s, after serving as Dean of the Dental Faculty at the University of Detroit, Cummer chose to leave the profession. He was ordained as a minister in 1938.

== Legacy ==
The University of Toronto described Dr. Cummer as "probably the first dental teacher to organize the scientific teaching of removable partial denture prosthesis and his accomplishments in this field were known throughout the world."

The Cummer Classification, a foundational system in prosthodontics for classifying partially edentulous arches to guide the design of Removable Partial Dentures, is named for him.
