= Ted Lozanski =

Profile
- Position: Quarterback

Personal information
- Born: August 25, 1926; Winnipeg, Manitoba, Canada
- Died: September 7, 1976 (aged 50); Brandon, Manitoba, Canada
- Listed height: 5 ft 7 in (1.70 m)
- Listed weight: 135 lb (61 kg)

Career history
- 1949: Winnipeg Blue Bombers

T. L. (Ted) Lozanski (August 25, 1926 – September 7, 1976) was a Canadian professional football player who played for the Winnipeg Blue Bombers. He was also an ice hockey player, coach and executive (former president of the Manitoba Amateur Hockey Association). He is a recipient of the Manitoba Centennial Medal for his contributions to amateur hockey in Manitoba.
