= Rudy Grass =

Canadian football player

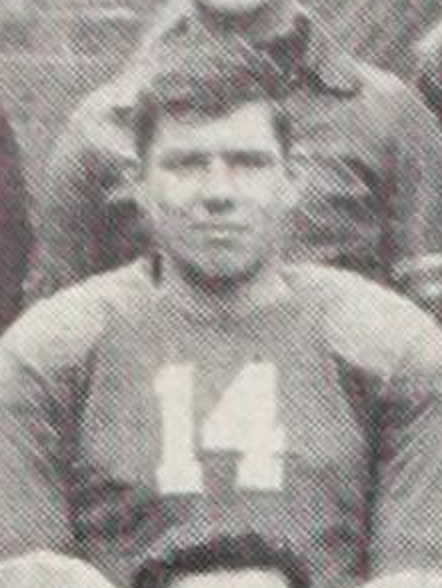
- pictured c. 1946 at the University of Toronto

Profile
- Positions: Guard, Tackle

Personal information
- Born: August 10, 1921; Toronto, Ontario, Canada
- Died: March 11, 2006 (aged 84); Toronto, Ontario, Canada
- Listed height: 6 ft 2 in (1.88 m)
- Listed weight: 210 lb (95 kg)

Career information
- University: Toronto

Career history
- 1947–1949: Toronto Argonauts

Awards and highlights
- Grey Cup champion (1947)

Ruliff Grass (August 10, 1921 – March 11, 2006) was a Canadian professional football player who played for the Toronto Argonauts. He won the Grey Cup with them in 1947. Grass attended the University of Toronto. He later started a construction company.
