= Doug Drew =

American gridiron football player (1920–2005)

Profile
- Position: Guard

Personal information
- Born: July 27, 1920; Bowbells, North Dakota
- Died: May 3, 2005 (aged 84); Bowbells, North Dakota, U.S.

Career information
- College: Minot State

Career history
- 1947–1948: Saskatchewan Roughriders

Awards and highlights
- CFL West All-Star (1947)

Douglas P. Drew (July 27, 1920 – May 3, 2005) was an American who played in the Canadian Football League for the Regina Roughriders in the 1947 and 1948 seasons. He attended Minot State University.
