= Rod Smylie =

Canadian ice hockey player (1895–1985)

- Born: September 28, 1895 Toronto, Ontario, Canada
- Died: March 4, 1985 (aged 89) Toronto, Ontario, Canada
- Height: 5 ft 10 in (178 cm)
- Weight: 170 lb (77 kg; 12 st 2 lb)
- Position: Left wing
- Shot: Right
- Played for: Toronto St. Patricks; Ottawa Senators
- Playing career: 1920–1926

Roderick Thomas Smylie (September 28, 1895 – March 4, 1985) was a Canadian ice hockey player. Smylie played six seasons in the National Hockey League for the Toronto St. Patricks and Ottawa Senators. He won the Stanley Cup in 1922 with Toronto. He was the last surviving member of the 1921–22 Stanley Cup championship team.

== Playing career ==
Smylie was born in Toronto. In 1915–16, Smylie played junior hockey for the Toronto R & AA team. In 1916, he enrolled in the University of Toronto and joined the U of T Dental College senior team. He played four seasons with the Dentals, including an Allan Cup series in 1917. In 1920, Smylie started his professional career with the Toronto St. Patricks. Smylie played three seasons with the St. Pats, including the 1922 Stanley Cup championship. In 1923–24, Smylie played one season for the Ottawa Senators, before returning to Toronto for two more seasons with the St. Pats before retiring from ice hockey.

== Personal life ==
After his hockey career, he continued a physician and practiced at St. Michael's Hospital in Toronto. He has been described as the first surgeon to play in the NHL. His sons Rod and Doug both played professional football for the Toronto Argonauts and won the Grey Cup in 1952.

== Career statistics ==
=== Regular season and playoffs ===
			Regular season					Playoffs
Season	Team	League	GP	G	A	Pts	PIM	GP	G	A	Pts	PIM
1915–16	Toronto R&AA	OHA Jr	—	—	—	—	—	—	—	—	—	—
1916–17	Toronto Dentals	OHA Sr	7	7	0	7	—	3	3	0	3	0
1916–17	Toronto Dentals	Al-Cup	—	—	—	—	—	4	2	2	4	4
1917–18	Toronto Dentals	OHA Sr	8	13	0	13	—	2	0	0	0	0
1918–19	Toronto Dentals	OHA Sr	7	8	5	13	—	2	1	1	2	0
1919–20	Toronto Dentals	OHA Sr	5	8	3	11	0	—	—	—	—	—
1920–21	Toronto St. Pats	NHL	23	2	1	3	2	2	0	0	0	0
1921–22	Toronto St. Pats	NHL	20	0	0	0	2	1	0	0	0	2
1921–22	Toronto St. Pats	St-Cup	—	—	—	—	—	5	1	3	4	0
1923–23	Toronto St. Pats	NHL	2	0	0	0	0	—	—	—	—	—
1923–24	Ottawa Senators	NHL	13	1	1	2	8	—	—	—	—	—
1924–25	Toronto St. Pats	NHL	11	1	0	1	0	1	0	0	0	0
1925–26	Toronto St. Pats	NHL	5	0	0	0	0	—	—	—	—	—
NHL totals			74	4	2	6	12	4	0	0	0	2
