= Johnny Showalter =

American football quarterback

Profile
- Position: Quarterback

Personal information
- Born: c. 1920; Eugene, Oregon, U.S.
- Listed weight: 175 lb (79 kg)

Career history
- 1946: Saskatchewan Roughriders

Johnny Showalter was an American Canadian football quarterback who played for the Saskatchewan Roughriders in 1946. He played college football at the University of Oregon and Gonzaga University. He was from Eugene, Oregon, U.S.
