= Benny Steck =

Canadian football player (1921–2012)

Profile
- Positions: Guard, Tackle

Personal information
- Born: May 5, 1921; Montreal, Quebec, Canada
- Died: October 22, 2012 (aged 91); Ottawa, Ontario, Canada
- Listed height: 6 ft 0 in (1.83 m)
- Listed weight: 195 lb (88 kg)

Career history
- 1945–1946: Montreal Hornets/Alouettes
- 1947–1951: Ottawa Rough Riders

Awards and highlights
- Grey Cup champion (1951)

Benny Steck (May 5, 1921 – October 22, 2012) was a Canadian professional football player who played for the Ottawa Rough Riders and Montreal Alouettes. He won the Grey Cup with Ottawa in 1951. Steck was born to Latvian immigrants in Montreal, where he played junior and senior football. He was later a grocer. He died in Ottawa in 2012.
