= Don Hiney =

Canadian football player

Profile
- Positions: Kicker, Halfback, Quarterback

Personal information
- Listed height: 5 ft 11 in (1.80 m)
- Listed weight: 165 lb (75 kg)

Career information
- College: North Dakota

Career history
- 1946–1949: Winnipeg Blue Bombers

Don Hiney was an American professional football player who played for the Winnipeg Blue Bombers. He played college football at the University of North Dakota.
