= Gainor =

Gainor is a surname. Notable people with the surname include:

- Charlie Gainor (1916–1996), American football player
- Chris Gainor (born 1954), Canadian historian of technology
- Dutch Gainor (1904–1962), Canadian ice hockey player
- Martin Gainor (1915–1959), Canadian football player
