= Del Wardien =

Canadian football player (1924–2007)

Profile
- Positions: Forward, Kicker

Personal information
- Born: January 14, 1924; Minnesota, U.S.
- Died: October 6, 2007 (aged 83); King County, Washington, U.S.
- Listed height: 5 ft 8 in (1.73 m)
- Listed weight: 175 lb (79 kg)

Career information
- College: Montana

Career history
- 1947: Calgary Stampeders
- 1948–1954: Saskatchewan Roughriders

Awards and highlights
- 3× CFL West All-Star (1947, 1949, 1950)

Darrell E. Wardien (January 14, 1924 – October 6, 2007) was an American professional football player who played for the Calgary Stampeders and Saskatchewan Roughriders. He played college football at the University of Montana, in the United States. In 1991 he was included on the Saskatchewan Roughriders' Plaza of Honour.
