= List of Canadian Football League yards leaders =

This is a list of Canadian Football League (CFL) yards leaders by year.

Year	Scrimmage yards	Special teams yards	Combined yards
1954	1,360 Alex Webster	805 John Fedosoff	1,791 Ken Carpenter
1955	1,525 Pat Abbruzzi	960 Don Pinhey	1,610 Pat Abruzzi
1956	2,039 Hal Patterson	988 Don Pinhey	2,858 Hal Patterson
1957	1,979 Johnny Bright	1,026 Harry Lunn	2,011 Johnny Bright
1958	1,987 Johnny Bright	1,512 Mike Hagler	2,550 Mike Hagler
1959	1,846 Johnny Bright	817 Rollie Miles	1,886 Johnny Bright
1960	1,602 Dick Shatto	792 Harvey Wylie	1,944 Willie Fleming
1961	1,905 Earl Lunsford	1,009 Harvey Wylie	1,990 Earl Lunsford
1962	1,913 George Dixon	1,215 Harvey Wylie	2,209 George Dixon
1963	1,873 Willie Fleming	911 Joe Hernandez	2,027 Willie Fleming
1964	2,071 Ed Buchanan	768 Leo Lewis	2,423 Ed Buchanan
1965	1,997 George Reed	657 Garney Henley	2,222 George Reed
1966	1,612 Dave Raimey	986 Trent Walters	2,086 Dave Raimey
1967	1,662 Terry Evanshen	834 Trent Walters	1,986 Dave Raimey
1968	1,643 Bill Symons	980 Vic Washington	2,220 Dave Raimey
1969	1,506 George Reed	631 Rudy Linterman	2,063 Vic Washington
1970	1,431 Hugh McKinnis	882 Al Marcelin	1,442 Hugh McKinnis
1971	1,436 Jim Thorpe	1,019 Mack Herron	2,347 Mack Herron
1972	1,978 Mack Herron	1,033 Monroe Eley	2,530 Mack Herron
1973	1,655 Roy Bell	1,034 Larry Highbaugh	1,820 Roy Bell
1974	1,759 Lou Harris	752 Tom Scott	2,040 Monroe Eley
1975	2,127 Willie Burden	1,480 Larry Highbaugh	2,487 Willie Burden
1976	1,765 Art Green	1,667 Rocky Long	2,565 Jimmy Edwards
1977	1,804 Jimmy Edwards	1,509 Paul Williams	2,673 Jimmy Edwards
1978	1,640 James Sykes	1,122 Paul Bennett	2,377 James Sykes
1979	1,888 David Green	1,226 Mike Nelms	2,302 David Green
1980	1,845 James Sykes	1,425 Leon Bright	2,777 James Sykes
1981	1,715 Joey Walters	1,552 Devon Ford	2,136 James Sykes
1982	1,692 Joey Walters	1,411 Larry Crawford	1,965 Alvin Walker
1983	2,018 Terry Greer	1,131 Joe Holliman	2,390 Johnny Shepherd
1984	2,140 Willard Reaves	1,896 Rufus Crawford	2,896 Rufus Crawford
1985	1,760 Mervyn Fernandez	1,358 Darnell Clash	2,121 Keyvan Jenkins
1986	1,796 James Murphy	1,475 Jeff Treftlin	2,264 James Murphy
1987	1,724 Willard Reaves	1,786 Gizmo Williams	2,138 Stephen Jones
1988	1,472 David Williams	1,433 Gizmo Williams	2,618 Earl Winfield
1989	2,034 Tim McCray	1,747 Tony Hunter	2,684 Tim McCray
1990	1,879 Robert Mimbs	1,876 Mike Clemons	3,300 Mike Clemons
1991	2,207 Robert Mimbs	2,352 Willis Jacox	3,049 Rocket Ismail
1992	1,591 Allen Pitts	1,890 Rocket Ismail	2,767 Gizmo Williams
1993	1,508 Dave Sapunjis	1,426 Marvin Coleman	2,523 Gizmo Williams
1994	2,414 Mike Pringle	1,576 Gizmo Williams	3,228 Mike Pringle
1995	2,067 Mike Pringle	2,255 Chris Wright	2,598 Mike Clemons
1996	1,738 Robert Mimbs	1,739 Jimmy Cunningham	2,548 Jimmy Cunningham
1997	2,088 Mike Pringle	2,440 Mike Clemons	3,840 Mike Clemons
1998	2,414 Mike Pringle	2,878 Eric Blount	3,816 Eric Blount
1999	1,930 Kelvin Anderson	1,793 Jimmy Cunningham	2,367 Jimmy Cunningham
2000	2,111 Mike Pringle	2,447 Albert Johnson III	3,241 Albert Johnson III
2001	1,845 Michael Jenkins	2,387 Antonio Warren	2,924 Antonio Warren
2002	1,896 Milt Stegall	2,038 Corey Holmes	2,914 Charles Roberts
2003	2,102 Charles Roberts	2,060 Winston October	3,147 Charles Roberts
2004	1,920 Charles Roberts	2,263 Winston October	2,704 Corey Holmes
2005	2,098 Charles Roberts	2,117 Aaron Lockett	3,455 Corey Holmes
2006	2,020 Charles Roberts	1,926 Albert Johnson III	2,020 Charles Roberts
2007	1,737 Charles Roberts	2,265 Ian Smart	2,440 Ian Smart
2008	1,680 Wes Cates	2,633 Ian Smart	2,892 Dominique Dorsey
2009	1,935 Joffrey Reynolds	1,971 Larry Taylor	2,535 Marquay McDaniel
2010	1,722 Cory Boyd	2,701 Chad Owens	3,288 Chad Owens
2011	2,019 Brandon Whitaker	2,609 Chad Owens	3,345 Chad Owens
2012	1,830 Andrew Harris	2,510 Chad Owens	3,863 Chad Owens
2013	2,157 Jon Cornish		2,298 Chad Owens
2014	1,470 Adarius Bowman		1,968 Brandon Banks
2015	1,523 Andrew Harris		2,557 Stefan Logan
2016	1,757 Adarius Bowman		2,945 Chris Rainey
2017	1,892 Andrew Harris		3,181 Chris Rainey
2018	1,841 Andrew Harris		2,704 Diontae Spencer
2019	1,902 Andrew Harris		2,183 Chris Rainey
2021	1,290 Will Stanback		2,234 DeVonte Dedmon
2022	1,444 James Butler; 1,444 Dalton Schoen		2,511 Terry Williams
2023	2,016 Brady Oliveira	2,432 Terry Williams	2,463 Tyreik McAllister
2024	1,829 Brady Oliveira	2,287 James Letcher Jr.	2,329 James Letcher Jr.
2025	1,726 Justin Rankin	2,266 Trey Vaval	2,424 Javon Leake
