= 1948 in Canadian football =

== Canadian football news in 1948 ==
The WIFU increased their games from 8 to 12 games per team.

The Hamilton Tigers, formerly of the IRFU, joined the ORFU, and the Hamilton Wildcats joined the IRFU on Friday, April 9.

The Regina/Saskatchewan Roughriders and the Calgary Stampeders changed their team colours. The Roughriders adopted green and white, and the Stampeders reverted to red and white.

In the Grey Cup game, the Stampeders introduced pageantry with saddle horses and chuck wagons as they defeated the Ottawa Rough Riders 12–7 to win their first Grey Cup.

== Regular season ==
=== Final regular season standings ===
Note: GP = Games played, W = Wins, L = Losses, T = Ties, PF = Points for, PA = Points against, Pts = Points

Western Interprovincial Football Union
Team	GP	W	L	T	PF	PA	Pts
**Calgary Stampeders**	12	12	0	0	218	61	24
**Regina Roughriders**	12	3	9	0	133	137	6
Winnipeg Blue Bombers	12	3	9	0	81	234	6

Interprovincial Rugby Football Union
Team	GP	W	L	T	PF	PA	Pts
**Ottawa Rough Riders**	12	10	2	0	264	130	20
**Montreal Alouettes**	12	7	5	0	221	172	14
Toronto Argonauts	12	5	6	1	160	191	11
Hamilton Wildcats	12	1	10	1	88	240	3

Ontario Rugby Football Union
Team	GP	W	L	T	PF	PA	Pts
**Hamilton Tigers**	9	9	0	0	279	54	18
**Toronto Beaches-Indians**	9	5	4	0	124	86	10
Sarnia Imperials	9	3	5	1	72	130	7
Windsor Rockets	9	0	8	1	40	245	1

- Bold text means that they had clinched the playoffs.

== Grey Cup playoffs ==
Note: All dates in 1948

=== Finals ===
WIFU Finals – Game 1
Calgary Stampeders @ Regina Roughriders
Date	Away	Home
November 6	Calgary Stampeders 4	Regina Roughriders 4

WIFU Finals – Game 2
Regina Roughriders @ Calgary Stampeders
Date	Away	Home
November 11	Regina Roughriders 6	**Calgary Stampeders 17**

- Calgary won the total-point series by 21–10. The Stampeders advanced to the Grey Cup game.

ORFU Finals – Game 1
Hamilton Tigers @ Toronto Beaches-Indians
Date	Away	Home
November 5	**Hamilton Tigers 8**	Toronto Beaches-Indians 0

ORFU Finals – Game 2
Toronto Beaches-Indians @ Hamilton Tigers
Date	Away	Home
November 13	Toronto Beaches-Indians 1	**Hamilton Tigers 31**

- Hamilton won the total-point series by 39–1. The Tigers would play the Ottawa Rough Riders in the Eastern finals.

IRFU Finals – Game 1
Montreal Alouettes @ Ottawa Rough Riders
Date	Away	Home
November 11	**Montreal Alouettes 21**	Ottawa Rough Riders 19

IRFU Finals – Game 2
Ottawa Rough Riders @ Montreal Alouettes
Date	Away	Home
November 13	**Ottawa Rough Riders 15**	Montreal Alouettes 7

- Ottawa won the total-point series by 34–28. The Rough Riders would play the Hamilton Tigers in the Eastern finals.

=== Eastern Finals ===
Hamilton Tigers @ Ottawa Rough Riders
Date	Away	Home
November 20	Hamilton Tigers 0	**Ottawa Rough Riders 19**

- The Ottawa Rough Riders advanced to the Grey Cup game.

== Playoff bracket ==
**Quarterfinals**
IRFU	Ottawa Rough Riders	19-15
IRFU	Montreal Alouettes	21-7
**EAST**
ORFU	Hamilton Tigers	8-31
ORFU	Toronto Balmy Beach	0-0
WIFU	No quarter final
**WEST**
WIFU	No quarter final

**Semifinals**
IRFU	Ottawa Rough Riders	19
ORFU	Hamilton Tigers	0
WIFU	Calgary Stampeders	4-17
WIFU	Regina Roughriders	4-6

**Grey Cup final**
IRFU	Ottawa Rough Riders	7
WIFU	Calgary Stampeders	12

== Grey Cup Championship ==
November 27 36th Annual Grey Cup Game: Varsity Stadium – Toronto, Ontario
WIFU Champion	IRFU Champion
**Calgary Stampeders 12**	Ottawa Rough Riders 7
**The Calgary Stampeders were the 1948 Grey Cup Champions.**

This was the first Grey Cup win for Calgary after the team became the first (and still only) team to go undefeated in the regular season and playoffs.

== 1948 Eastern (Interprovincial Rugby Football Union) All-Stars ==
Note: During this time most players played both ways, so the All-Star selections do not distinguish between some offensive and defensive positions.

- QB – Bob Paffrath, Ottawa Rough Riders
- HB – Howie Turner, Ottawa Rough Riders
- HB – Virgil Wagner, Montreal Alouettes
- HB – Joe Krol, Toronto Argonauts
- E – Bert Haigh, Ottawa Rough Riders
- E – Ralph Toohy, Montreal Alouettes
- FW – Tony Golab, Hamilton Wildcats
- C – Don Loney, Ottawa Rough Riders
- G – Eddie Michaels, Ottawa Rough Riders
- G – Lloyd "Bronco" Reese, Montreal Alouettes
- T – Herb Trawick, Montreal Alouettes
- T – John Wagoner, Ottawa Rough Riders

== 1948 Ontario Rugby Football Union All-Stars ==
Note: During this time most players played both ways, so the All-Star selections do not distinguish between some offensive and defensive positions.

- QB – Frank Filchock, Hamilton Tigers
- HB – Jack Harper, Hamilton Tigers
- HB – Jack Stewart, Hamilton Tigers
- DB – Doug Pyzer, Toronto Beaches-Indians
- E – Verne Picard, Toronto Beaches-Indians
- E – Danny DiFrancisco, Hamilton Tigers
- FW – Gerry Walsh, Hamilton Tigers
- C – Jake Gaudaur, Hamilton Tigers
- G – Don McKenzie, Toronto Beaches-Indians
- G – Eddie Remigis, Hamilton Tigers
- T – Pat Santucci, Hamilton Tigers
- T – Lorne Parkin, Toronto Beaches-Indians

== 1948 Western (Western Interprovincial Football Union) All-Stars ==
NOTE: During this time most players played both ways, so the All-Star selections do not distinguish between some offensive and defensive positions.

- QB – Keith Spaith, Calgary Stampeders
- HB – Don Hiney, Winnipeg Blue Bombers
- HB – Ken Charlton, Saskatchewan Roughriders
- HB – Gabe Patterson, Saskatchewan Roughriders
- FB – Paul Rowe, Calgary Stampeders
- E – Johnny Bell, Saskatchewan Roughriders
- E – Woody Strode, Calgary Stampeders
- C – Chuck Anderson, Calgary Stampeders
- G – Bud Irving, Winnipeg Blue Bombers
- G – Bert Iannone, Calgary Stampeders
- G – Dave Tomlinson, Calgary Stampeders
- T – Johnny Aguirre, Calgary Stampeders
- T – Mike Cassidy, Saskatchewan Roughriders

== 1948 Canadian Football Awards ==
- Jeff Russel Memorial Trophy (IRFU MVP) – Eric Chipper (OT), Ottawa Rough Riders
- Jeff Nicklin Memorial Trophy (WIFU MVP) - Keith Spaith (QB), Calgary Stampeders
- Gruen Trophy (IRFU Rookie of the Year) - Keith English (E), Montreal Alouettes
- Imperial Oil Trophy (ORFU MVP) - Frank Filchock - Hamilton Tigers
