= Ed Norvack =

Canadian football player

Profile
- Position: Guard

Personal information
- Born: c. 1924; Glace Bay, Nova Scotia, Canada
- Listed height: 6 ft 1 in (1.85 m)
- Listed weight: 225 lb (102 kg)

Career history
- 1947–1951, 1954: Winnipeg Blue Bombers

Edward Norvack (born c. 1924, date of death unknown) was a Canadian professional football player who played for the Winnipeg Blue Bombers. From Glace Bay, Nova Scotia, Norvack served in the Canadian Air Force during World War II and played soccer for the Cape Breton Highlanders. Norvack was dropped by the team in September 1954. He is deceased.
