= Ian Gibb =

Canadian football player

Profile
- Positions: Forward, Halfback

Personal information
- Born: c. 1925
- Died: January 12, 1983 (aged 57); Saint Boniface, Manitoba
- Listed height: 5 ft 9 in (1.75 m)
- Listed weight: 170 lb (77 kg)

Career history
- 1949–1952: Winnipeg Blue Bombers

Ian C. Gibb (c. 1925 – January 12, 1983) was a Canadian professional football player who played for the Winnipeg Blue Bombers.
