= Red Noel =

American gridiron football player (1925–1997)

Profile
- Position: End

Personal information
- Born: September 17, 1925; Massachusetts, United States
- Died: January 2, 1997 (aged 71); San Diego, California
- Listed height: 6 ft 2 in (1.88 m)
- Listed weight: 205 lb (93 kg)

Career information
- College: Maine

Career history
- 1947: Regina Roughriders
- 1948: Montreal Alouettes

Awards and highlights
- CFL West All-Star (1947)

Robert (Red) Noel (September 17, 1925 – January 2, 1997) was an American professional football player who played for the Regina Roughriders and Montreal Alouettes. He attended the University of Maine. He died in 1997.
