= Nate Shore =

Canadian football player

Nathan Shore
Profile
- Position: Guard

Personal information
- Born: c. 1920
- Listed height: 5 ft 11 in (1.80 m)
- Listed weight: 205 lb (93 kg)

Career history
- 1941: Winnipeg Blue Bombers
- 1945–1947: Winnipeg Blue Bombers
- 1949: Edmonton Eskimos

Awards and highlights
- Grey Cup champion (1941)

Nathan Shore (born c. 1920) was a Canadian football player who played for the Edmonton Eskimos and Winnipeg Blue Bombers. He won the Grey Cup with Winnipeg in 1941. He played junior football in Winnipeg.
