= Wayne Giardino =

Canadian athlete and coach (1943–2021)

Profile
- Position: Linebacker / Fullback

Personal information
- Born: November 7, 1943; Peterborough, Ontario, Canada
- Died: February 16, 2021 (aged 77); Almonte, Ontario, Canada

Career information
- College: Florida State

Career history
- 1967–75: Ottawa Rough Riders

Awards and highlights
- 3× Grey Cup champion (1968, 1969, 1973); Gruen Trophy (1967)

Wayne Giardino (November 7, 1943 – February 16, 2021) was a Canadian athlete and coach in Canadian football. Giardino was a linebacker and Grey Cup Champion in the Canadian Football League with the Ottawa Rough Riders.

A graduate of Florida State University, Giardino joined the Ottawa Rough Riders in 1967. Rushing 3 times for 15 yards and blocking a kick in his rookie season was good enough to win the Gruen Trophy as best rookie in the East (this at a time when only Canadians were eligible for the award.) He later became a starting linebacker and dependable back up fullback, his best year being 1971 when he rushed for 201 yards. On defence, he intercepted six passes, returning three for touchdowns, and took fumble recoveries back for another three touchdowns, including 146 yards in 1972, still the second best in CFL history. On offence, he rushed for 536 yards and caught 44 passes during his career. He was a Grey Cup champion three times: 1968, 1969 and 1973. Finally, he was the head coach of the Ottawa Sooners junior team in 1994, leading them to a 7 win and 2 loss season.

== Awards and honours ==
- 1967 - Gruen Trophy
- 2014 - Ottawa Sports Hall of Fame
