= Rick Black =

Canadian football player

Profile
- Position: Fullback / Punter

Personal information
- Born: 1943 (age 82–83); Ottawa, Ontario, Canada
- Listed height: 6 ft 0 in (1.83 m)
- Listed weight: 210 lb (95 kg)

Career information
- University: Mount Allison

Career history
- 1963–1968: Ottawa Rough Riders

Awards and highlights
- Grey Cup champion (1968); Gruen Trophy (1963)

Rick Black is a former award-winning Fullback and Grey Cup Champion in the Canadian Football League.

A graduate of Mount Allison University, Black joined the Ottawa Rough Riders in 1963. He was the starting punter during his rookie season (79 punts for a 36.9 yard average) and on the strength of his kicking, won the Gruen Trophy as best rookie in the East (this at a time when only Canadians were eligible for the award.) He later developed into a reliable reserve fullback, his best year being 1965 when he rushed for 480 yards. In total, he rushed for 1309 yards, caught 28 passes and scored 12 touchdowns. Black retired October 2, 1968, missing the Grey Cup championship game that season.

In 2003 he was sentenced to 2 years in jail for fraud, a charge he vehemently denied.
