= Dave Tomlinson (Canadian football) =

Canadian football player (1926–2005)

Profile
- Positions: Halfback, Guard

Personal information
- Born: July 24, 1926; Calgary, Alberta, Canada
- Died: November 10, 2005 (aged 79); North Vancouver, British Columbia, Canada
- Listed height: 6 ft 0 in (1.83 m)
- Listed weight: 220 lb (100 kg)

Career history
- 1945–1948: Calgary Stampeders
- 1952–1953: Montreal Alouettes
- 1954–1955: Calgary Stampeders

Awards and highlights
- Grey Cup champion (1948)

David Holland "Baldy" Tomlinson (July 24, 1926 – November 10, 2005) was a Canadian professional football player who played for the Calgary Stampeders and Montreal Alouettes. He won the Grey Cup with the Stampeders in 1948. He previously played football for the McGill University Redmen. He died at the age of 79 on November 10, 2005.
