= Doug Belden =

American gridiron football player (1927–1972)

No. 93
- Position: Quarterback

Personal information
- Born: April 24, 1927; Bradenton, Florida, U.S.
- Died: July 8, 1972 (aged 45); Tampa, Florida, U.S.
- Listed height: 6 ft 0 in (1.83 m)
- Listed weight: 197 lb (89 kg)

Career information
- High school: Henry B. Plant (Tampa)
- College: Florida
- NFL draft: 1948: 27th round, 255th overall pick

Career history
- 1949, 1952: Saskatchewan Roughriders

Awards and highlights
- WIFU second-team All-Star (1949)

Douglas Ray Belden (April 24, 1927 – July 8, 1972) was an American professional football player who was a quarterback for the Saskatchewan Roughriders of the Western Interprovincial Football Union (WIFU). He participated in college football, baseball, basketball, and track at the University of Florida, where he was the last four-sport letterman in school history. In 1949, Belden was named a WIFU second-team All-Star while leading the Roughriders to an appearance in the WIFU finals. After retiring from football to take a job with a liquor company, he returned to the Roughriders in 1952.

At one time, he was also the youngest city councilman in Tampa, Florida, history at 26 years old. Belden was inducted into the University of Florida Athletic Hall of Fame in 1969.

== Early life ==
Douglas Ray Belden was born on April 24, 1927, in Bradenton, Florida. He attended Henry B. Plant High School in Tampa, Florida. For most of his junior high and high school career, Belden was small at 5 feet 9 inches (1.75 m) and 130 pounds (59 kg). After school hours, he served as waterboy for the University of Tampa football team and assistant manager for the university's basketball team. He was captain of the Plant High basketball team. Belden also "got into just enough games" to earn a letter in football his senior year.

== College career ==
In 1944, Belden enrolled at the University of Florida in Gainesville, Florida. He played varsity basketball during the 1944–45 season as a 17-year-old freshman. He was second on the team with 160 points. In March 1945, Belden was elected captain of the basketball team for the 1944–45 season, becoming the first freshman in school history to be a varsity captain in any sport. University of Florida policy dictated that sport team captains were only chosen after the end of each season. At 5 feet 10 inches (1.78 m) and 145 pounds (66 kg)., he also made the varsity football team his freshman year but "just barely."

Beginning in 1945, he served 18 months in the United States Navy during World War II and saw action in the Pacific Theatre. Upon returning from the war in 1946, he had grown to over 6' tall and weighed 190 pounds (86 kg). He was a tailback during the 1946 football season, splitting time throwing the ball with quarterback Billy Parker, as the Gators finished 0–9. Belden was the starting quarterback from 1947 to 1948. He led the Gators to a 4–5–1 record in 1947. As a senior captain in 1948, Belden completed 48 of 115 passes for 624 yards while also throwing ten interceptions as Florida went 5–5. He set a since-broken school record for single game completions with 14 on November 13, 1948, against the Kentucky Wildcats. Belden earned honorable mention All-South honors for the 1948 season.

Belden also participated in baseball and track for the Gators. Belden was a javelin thrower on the track team, and was the last four-sport letterman in University of Florida history. He played in six games as a guard during the 1947–48 basketball season, and averaged 1.8 points per game. In 1949, he was inducted into the University of Florida Hall of Fame, which is "reserved for those students who have shown truly superior leadership and achievement through their activities and scholarship while members of the University of Florida community." He graduated in June 1949. Belden was later inducted into the University of Florida Athletic Hall of Fame as a "Gator Great" in 1969.

== Professional career ==
On December 19, 1947, Belden was selected by the Chicago Cardinals in the 27th round, with the 255th overall pick, of the 1948 NFL draft. However, he never signed with the Cardinals. He instead signed with the Saskatchewan Roughriders of the Western Interprovincial Football Union (WIFU) on April 30, 1949. Belden was listed as a quarterback/halfback in 1949. He dressed in all 14 games, starting nine, while scoring four passing touchdowns and one rushing touchdown as the Roughriders finished the season with a 9–5 record. He was named a WIFU second-team All-Star at quarterback for his performance during the 1949 season. Saskatchewan faced the Calgary Stampeders in the 1949 WIFU finals, losing game one 18–12 but winning game two 9–4. The Stampeders advanced to the 37th Grey Cup due to winning the point margin 22–21. Belden re-signed with the Roughriders shortly after the 1949 season. However, a few weeks later, he retired from football to take a job with a liquor company.

Belden later re-signed with the Roughriders in May 1952. He was listed as a quarterback/defensive back in 1952. On October 4 against the Edmonton Eskimos, he suffered torn cartilage in his right knee and missed the final four games of the season. He dressed in 12 games, starting three, overall during the 1952 season, recording 30 completions on 78 passing attempts (38.5%) for 470 yards, five touchdowns, and five interceptions, one rushing touchdown, four kickoff returns for 73 yards, three interceptions on defense, and two fumble recoveries. Saskatchewan finished the year with a 3–13 record.

== Personal life ==
Belden was an official for high school and college football games. He also played in the Tampa City Basketball League. In 1951, he married Jeanne Flynn, the daughter of Olympic gold medalist Edward Flynn. In 1953, Belden became the youngest city councilman in Tampa history at 26 years old. He suffered an aneurysm on June 20, 1972, while playing golf. He then went into a coma and died on July 8, 1972, in Tampa. Belden was the vice president of Bay Distributors at the time of his death.

== See also ==
- List of University of Florida Athletic Hall of Fame members
