= Lorne Parkin =

Canadian football player (1922–1992)

Profile
- Positions: Guard, Tackle

Personal information
- Born: October 2, 1922; Toronto, Ontario, Canada
- Died: December 2, 1992 (aged 70); Toronto, Ontario, Canada
- Listed height: 6 ft 1 in (1.85 m)
- Listed weight: 215 lb (98 kg)

Career history
- 1949–1955: Toronto Argonauts

Awards and highlights
- 2× Grey Cup champion (1950, 1952)

John Lorne Parkin (October 2, 1922 – December 2, 1992) was a Canadian professional football player who played for the Toronto Argonauts. He won the Grey Cup with them in 1950 and 1952. He was also a sergeant for the Toronto Police Service.
