= 1946 in Canadian football =

== Canadian Football News in 1946 ==
The WIFU resumed play for the first time since 1942. The IRFU increased their season play from 6 games to 12 games, per team.

The Montreal Alouettes came into existence. The Regina Roughriders unofficially changed their name to become the Saskatchewan Roughriders. The name change eventually became official on April 1, 1950.

Air travel was used for the first time as the Toronto Argonauts flew to Winnipeg to play pre-season games against the Blue Bombers.

== Regular season ==
=== Final regular season standings ===
Note: GP = Games Played, W = Wins, L = Losses, T = Ties, PF = Points For, PA = Points Against, Pts = Points

Western Interprovincial Football Union
Team	GP	W	L	T	PF	PA	Pts
**Calgary Stampeders**	8	5	3	0	60	37	10
**Winnipeg Blue Bombers**	8	5	3	0	69	46	10
Regina Roughriders	8	2	6	0	46	92	4

Interprovincial Rugby Football Union
Team	GP	W	L	T	PF	PA	Pts
**Montreal Alouettes**	12	7	3	2	211	118	16
**Toronto Argonauts**	12	7	3	2	140	124	16
Ottawa Rough Riders	12	6	4	2	175	128	14
Hamilton Tigers	12	0	10	2	78	234	2

Ontario Rugby Football Union
Team	GP	W	L	T	PF	PA	Pts
**Hamilton Wildcats**	10	8	1	1	166	66	17
**Toronto Indians**	10	8	1	1	176	66	17
**Toronto Balmy Beach Beachers**	10	6	4	0	112	84	12
**Sarnia Imperials**	10	4	6	0	88	158	8
Windsor Rockets	10	3	7	0	61	138	6
Ottawa Trojans	10	0	10	0	36	127	0

- Bold text means that they have clinched the playoffs.

== Grey Cup playoffs ==
Note: All dates in 1946

=== Semifinals ===
**ORFU semifinals**
Toronto Balmy Beach Beachers @ Toronto Indians
Date	Away	Home
November 8	**Toronto Balmy Beach Beachers 12**	Toronto Indians 7

- The Toronto Balmy Beach Beachers will play the Hamilton Wildcats in the ORFU Final.

**ORFU semifinals**
Sarnia Imperials @ Hamilton Wildcats
Date	Away	Home
November 9	Sarnia Imperials 5	**Hamilton Wildcats 14**

- The Hamilton Wildcats will play the Toronto Balmy Beach Beachers in the ORFU Final.

=== Finals ===
**WIFU Finals – Game 1**
Winnipeg Blue Bombers @ Calgary Stampeders
Date	Away	Home
October 26	Winnipeg Blue Bombers 18	**Calgary Stampeders 21**

**WIFU Finals – Game 2**
Calgary Stampeders @ Winnipeg Blue Bombers
Date	Away	Home
November 2	Calgary Stampeders 0	**Winnipeg Blue Bombers 12**

- The Winnipeg Blue Bombers won the total-point series by 30–21. Winnipeg advances to the Grey Cup game.

**ORFU Final**
Toronto Balmy Beach Beachers @ Hamilton Wildcats
Date	Away	Home
November 16	**Toronto Balmy Beach Beachers 13**	Hamilton Wildcats 6

- The Toronto Balmy Beach Beachers will play the Toronto Argonauts in the Eastern finals.

**IRFU Finals**
Toronto Argonauts @ Montreal Alouettes
Date	Away	Home
November 16	**Toronto Argonauts 12**	Montreal Alouettes 6

- The Toronto Argonauts will play the Toronto Balmy Beach Beachers in the Eastern finals.

=== Eastern Finals ===
Toronto Balmy Beach Beachers (ORFU) @ Toronto Argonauts
Date	Away	Home
November 23	Toronto Balmy Beach Beachers (ORFU) 12	**Toronto Argonauts 22**

- The Toronto Argonauts advance to the Grey Cup game.

== Playoff bracket ==
**Quarterfinals**
IRFU	Montreal Alouettes	6
IRFU	Toronto Argonauts	12
**EAST**
ORFU	Hamilton Wildcats	6
ORFU	Toronto Balmy Beach	13
WIFU	Winnipeg Blue Bombers
WIFU	BYE
**WEST**
WIFU	Calgary Stampeders
WIFU	BYE

**Semifinals**
IRFU	Toronto Argonauts	22
ORFU	Toronto Balmy Beach	12
WIFU	Winnipeg Blue Bombers	18-12
WIFU	Calgary Stampeders	21-0

**Grey Cup final**
IRFU	Toronto Argonauts	28
WIFU	Winnipeg Blue Bombers	6

== Grey Cup Championship ==
November 30 34th Annual Grey Cup Game: Varsity Stadium – Toronto, Ontario
WIFU Champion	IRFU Champion
Winnipeg Blue Bombers 6	**Toronto Argonauts 28**
**The Toronto Argonauts are the 1946 Grey Cup Champions**

== 1946 Eastern (Combined IRFU & ORFU) All-Stars ==
NOTE: During this time most players played both ways, so the All-Star selections do not distinguish between some offensive and defensive positions.

=== 1st Team ===
- QB – Frank Gnup, Hamilton Wildcats
- FW – Ken Charleton, Ottawa Rough Riders
- HB – Royal Copeland, Toronto Argonauts
- HB – Joe Krol, Toronto Argonauts
- HB – Virgil Wagner, Montreal Alouettes
- E – Dick Groom, Hamilton Tigers
- E – Bert Haigh, Ottawa Rough Riders
- C – Doug Turner, Toronto Balmy Beach Beachers
- G – Benny Steck, Montreal Alouettes
- G – Bill Zock, Toronto Argonauts
- T – Herb Trawick, Montreal Alouettes
- T – Hank Christman, Ottawa Rough Riders

=== 2nd Team ===
- QB – Frank Dunlap, Ottawa Rough Riders
- FW – Don McFarlane, University of Western Ontario
- HB – Bob McFarlane, University of Western Ontario
- HB – Don Toms, Hamilton Wildcats
- HB – Johnny Lake, Toronto Balmy Beach Beachers
- E – George Turnbull, University of Western Ontario
- E – Len Wright, Hamilton Wildcats
- C – Don Loney, Toronto Argonauts
- G – Don McKenzie, Toronto Balmy Beach Beachers
- G – Rudy Grass, University of Toronto
- T – Don Durno, Toronto Indians
- T – Vic Ghetti, Windsor Rockets

== 1946 Western (Western Interprovincial Football Union) All-Stars ==
NOTE: During this time most players played both ways, so the All-Star selections do not distinguish between some offensive and defensive positions.

- QB – Walter Dobler, Winnipeg Blue Bombers
- FW – Bill Wusyk, Calgary Stampeders
- HB – Sully Glasser, Regina Roughriders
- HB – Paul Rowe, Calgary Stampeders
- HB – Bill Ordway, Winnipeg Blue Bombers
- E – Johnny Bell, Regina Roughriders
- E – Nate Shore, Winnipeg Blue Bombers
- C – Mel Wilson, Winnipeg Blue Bombers
- G – David "Sneaky" Adams, Calgary Stampeders
- G – Bill Ceretti, Winnipeg Blue Bombers
- T – Andrew Nagy, Regina Roughriders
- T – Martin Gainor, Winnipeg Blue Bombers

== 1946 Ontario Rugby Football Union All-Stars ==
NOTE: During this time most players played both ways, so the All-Star selections do not distinguish between some offensive and defensive positions.

- QB – Frank Gnup, Hamilton Wildcats
- HB – Don Toms, Hamilton Wildcats
- HB – Ross McKelvey, Toronto Indians
- DB – Johnny Lake, Toronto Balmy Beach Beachers
- E – Len Wright, Hamilton Wildcats
- E – Johnny Farmer, Toronto Indians
- FW – Fred Kijek, Toronto Indians
- C – Doug Turner, Toronto Balmy Beach Beachers
- G – Don McKenzie, Toronto Balmy Beach Beachers
- G – Trip Trepanier, Sarnia Imperials
- T – Don Durno, Toronto Indians
- T – Vic Ghetti, Windsor Rockets

== 1946 Canadian Football Awards ==
- Jeff Russel Memorial Trophy (IRFU MVP) – Joe Krol (RB), Toronto Argonauts
- Jeff Nicklin Memorial Trophy (WIFU MVP) - Bill Wusyk (WR), Calgary Stampeders
- Gruen Trophy (IRFU Rookie of the Year) - Bernie Brennan (HB), Ottawa Rough Riders
- Imperial Oil Trophy (ORFU MVP) - Frank Gnup - Hamilton Wildcats
