= Ed Mularchyk =

Profile
- Positions: Kicker, End

Personal information
- Born: December 14, 1933
- Died: May 5, 1992 (aged 58); Windsor, Ontario, Canada

Career information
- CJFL: Windsor AKO Fratmen

Career history
- 1955, 1956: Ottawa Rough Riders

Awards and highlights
- Gruen Trophy (1955)

Ed Mularchyk is a former award winning Canadian Football League player.

Mularchyk played with Windsor AKO Fratmen, helping win the national Junior championship in 1954 (against the Winnipeg Rods). He played one season with the Ottawa Rough Riders and won the Gruen Trophy as Canadian rookie of the year in the east, though there was some controversy surrounding his selection. He later attended the University of Western Ontario, playing football and becoming an ophthalmologist.
