= Walter Dobler =

American gridiron football player (1919–1995)

Profile
- Position: Quarterback

Personal information
- Born: December 26, 1919; Linton, North Dakota, U.S.
- Died: November 5, 1995 (aged 75); Grafton, North Dakota, U.S.
- Listed height: 5 ft 9 in (1.75 m)
- Listed weight: 175 lb (79 kg)

Career information
- College: North Dakota

Career history
- 1946: Winnipeg Blue Bombers

Walter Dobler (December 26, 1919 – November 5, 1995) was an American professional football player for the Winnipeg Blue Bombers. He played college football at the University of North Dakota.
