= Royal College of Dental Surgeons of Ontario =

Regulatory body for dentists in Ontario, Canada

- Formation: March 4, 1868; 158 years ago
- Founded at: Toronto, Ontario
- Type: Regulatory college
- Purpose: Regulation of the dentistry profession in Ontario
- Headquarters: 6 Crescent Road; Toronto, Ontario
- Coordinates: 43.677429°N 79.389250°W
- Affiliations: Canadian Dental Regulatory Authorities Federation
- Website: rcdso.org

The Royal College of Dental Surgeons of Ontario (RCDSO) is the regulatory college for dentists in the province of Ontario, Canada. Its subordinate dental school became the nowadays University of Toronto Faculty of Dentistry in 1925.

The Royal College of Dental Surgeons of Ontario was established on March 4, 1868, through An Act Respecting Dentistry by the Legislative Assembly of Ontario, as both a regulatory and educational institution for the dental profession in Ontario, Canada. In 1875, it founded a dental school in Toronto, which became one of the earliest institutions providing formal dental education in Canada. The school affiliated with the University of Toronto in 1888, allowing students to obtain the Doctor of Dental Surgery (DDS) degree from the university, while the RCDSO continued to award its own professional qualifications, including the Licentiate of Dental Surgery (LDS).

In 1925, the dental school was fully integrated into the University of Toronto as its Faculty of Dentistry, marking a significant shift in the RCDSO's institutional responsibilities. The college subsequently evolved into a primarily regulatory body, responsible for licensing dentists, establishing professional standards, and overseeing dental practice in Ontario.

== Sources ==
- History, Mission & Vision, ODA: Ontario Dental Association
- ODA's First Female Dentist (1893), ODA: Ontario Dental Association
- Tomkins, Dr. Lynn (2017), "ODA Celebrates 150 Years of Leading Oral Health", CDA Essentials (1)
