= Bob Dawson (Canadian football) =

Canadian football player

Profile
- Positions: Defensive back, Quarterback

Personal information
- Born: February 4, 1932; Windsor, Ontario, Canada
- Died: December 10, 2017 (aged 85); Hamilton, Ontario, Canada

Career information
- CJFL: Windsor AKO Fratmen

Career history
- 1953–59: Hamilton Tiger-Cats

Awards and highlights
- 2× Grey Cup champion (1953, 1957); Gruen Trophy (1953)

Robert Charles Dawson (February 4, 1932 – December 10, 2017) was a former Canadian Football League player and a Grey cup champion.

Dawson was a standout junior player with the Windsor AKO Fratmen team, winners of the 1952 national junior championship (the "Little Grey Cup") in a 15–12 victory over the Edmonton Wildcats. Several CFL teams were bidding for his services, but he chose the Hamilton Tiger-Cats, with whom he'd have a 7-season career. In his first season, he won the Gruen Trophy as best rookie in the east (no stats were kept, and only Canadians qualified for the award) and won the Grey Cup championship. He also won the Grey Cup in 1957.

Primarily a defensive back, he made five interceptions in his career, and he could substitute on offense, catching 11 passes in 1956. He could also play quarterback, and in 1956 he got the chance, which was a rarity, as very few Canadians got to play quarterback during this era. On October 20, 1956, the Cats were suffering a record setting defeat to the Montreal Alouettes, 82–14, when coach Jim Trimble replaced starting quarterback Tony Curcillo. Dawson came on and completed five of eight passes for one touchdown.

Dawson was enshrined in the Windsor/Essex County Sports Hall of Fame in 2001. He died on December 10, 2017, at the age of 85.
