= Sully Glasser =

Canadian football player

Profile
- Position: Halfback

Personal information
- Born: October 25, 1922; Regina, Saskatchewan, Canada
- Died: August 1, 1986 (aged 63); Regina, Saskatchewan, Canada
- Listed height: 5 ft 10 in (1.78 m)
- Listed weight: 180 lb (82 kg)

Career history
- 1946–1957: Saskatchewan Roughriders

Awards and highlights
- CFL West All-Star (1946)

John Sullivan "Sully" Glasser (October 25, 1922 – August 1, 1986) was a Canadian professional football player who played for the Saskatchewan Roughriders.
