= Jeff Nicklin Memorial Trophy =

Canadian football league trophy

- Sport: Canadian football
- League: Canadian Football League
- Awarded for: West Division's most outstanding player
- Country: Canada

History
- First award: 1946
- Editions: 74
- Most wins: 7: Jackie Parker
- Most recent: Nathan Rourke (BC)
- Website

The Jeff Nicklin Memorial Trophy is a trophy awarded to the Canadian Football League West Division's most outstanding player, chosen from the nominees from each team in the division. Either this trophy winner or the winner of the Terry Evanshen Trophy also receives the Canadian Football League Most Outstanding Player Award.

The Nicklin Memorial Trophy was donated to the Western Interprovincial Football Union in 1946 by the 1st Canadian Parachute Battalion, in memory of their commanding officer, Lieutenant-Colonel Jeff Nicklin, who was killed in action on March 24, 1945. Nicklin was known as an outstanding defensive end for the Winnipeg Blue Bombers before he entered military service.

When first donated, the trophy was awarded annually to the player in the Western Division considered to be the most valuable to his team. Since 1973, the trophy is awarded to the Most Outstanding Player of the West Division. As part of the failed American expansion in 1995, the trophy was awarded to the Most Outstanding Player of the North Division.

== Jeff Nicklin Memorial Trophy winners (1946–1972) ==
Year	Player	Position	Team
Jeff Nickln Memorial Trophy winners (1946—1972)
1946	Bill Wusyk	Wide receiver	Calgary Stampeders
1947	Bob Sandberg	Running back	Winnipeg Blue Bombers
1948	Keith Spaith	Quarterback	Calgary Stampeders
1949	Keith Spaith	Quarterback	Calgary Stampeders
1950	Lindy Berry	Quarterback	Edmonton Eskimos
1951	Glenn Dobbs	Quarterback	Saskatchewan Roughriders
1952	Jack Jacobs	Quarterback	Winnipeg Blue Bombers
1953	John Henry Johnson	Running back	Calgary Stampeders
1954	Jackie Parker	Running back	Edmonton Eskimos
1955	Ken Carpenter	Running back	Saskatchewan Roughriders
1956	Jackie Parker	Quarterback	Edmonton Eskimos
1957	Jackie Parker	Quarterback	Edmonton Eskimos
1958	Jackie Parker	Quarterback	Edmonton Eskimos
1959	Jackie Parker	Quarterback	Edmonton Eskimos
1960	Jackie Parker	Quarterback	Edmonton Eskimos
1961	Jackie Parker	Quarterback	Edmonton Eskimos
1962	Eagle Day	Quarterback	Calgary Stampeders
1963	Joe Kapp	Quarterback	BC Lions
1964	Tom Brown	Linebacker	BC Lions
1965	George Reed	Running back	Saskatchewan Roughriders
1966	Ron Lancaster	Quarterback	Saskatchewan Roughriders
1967	Peter Liske	Quarterback	Calgary Stampeders
1968	Ron Lancaster	Quarterback	Saskatchewan Roughriders
1969	Ron Lancaster	Quarterback	Saskatchewan Roughriders
1970	Ron Lancaster	Quarterback	Saskatchewan Roughriders
1971	Don Jonas	Quarterback	Winnipeg Blue Bombers
1972	Mack Herron	Running back	Winnipeg Blue Bombers

== Jeff Nicklin Memorial Trophy winners (1973–present) ==
Bold indicates a player who went on to win the CFL's Most Outstanding Player Award

Year	Player	Position	Team
Jeff Nicklin Memorial Trophy winners (1973—present)
1973	**George McGowan**	Wide receiver	Edmonton Eskimos
1974	**Tom Wilkinson**	Quarterback	Edmonton Eskimos
1975	**Willie Burden**	Running back	Calgary Stampeders
1976	**Ron Lancaster**	Quarterback	Saskatchewan Roughriders
1977	Jerry Tagge	Quarterback	BC Lions
1978	Tom Wilkinson	Quarterback	Edmonton Eskimos
1979	Waddell Smith	Wide receiver	Edmonton Eskimos
1980	**Dieter Brock**	Quarterback	Winnipeg Blue Bombers
1981	**Dieter Brock**	Quarterback	Winnipeg Blue Bombers
1982	Tom Scott	Slotback	Edmonton Eskimos
1983	**Warren Moon**	Quarterback	Edmonton Eskimos
1984	**Willard Reaves**	Running back	Winnipeg Blue Bombers
1985	**Mervyn Fernandez**	Wide receiver	BC Lions
1986	**James Murphy**	Wide receiver	Winnipeg Blue Bombers
1987	**Brian Kelly**	Wide receiver	Edmonton Eskimos
1988	**David Williams**	Wide receiver	BC Lions
1989	**Tracy Ham**	Quarterback	Edmonton Eskimos
1990	Craig Ellis	Slotback	Edmonton Eskimos
1991	**Doug Flutie**	Quarterback	BC Lions
1992	**Doug Flutie**	Quarterback	Calgary Stampeders
1993	**Doug Flutie**	Quarterback	Calgary Stampeders
1994	**Doug Flutie**	Quarterback	Calgary Stampeders
1995	Dave Sapunjis	Slotback	Calgary Stampeders
1996	Robert Mimbs	Running back	Saskatchewan Roughriders
1997	Jeff Garcia	Quarterback	Calgary Stampeders
1998	Kelvin Anderson	Running back	Calgary Stampeders
1999	Allen Pitts	Slotback	Calgary Stampeders
2000	**Dave Dickenson**	Quarterback	Calgary Stampeders
2001	**Kelvin Anderson**	Running back	Calgary Stampeders
2002	**Milt Stegall**	Slotback	Winnipeg Blue Bombers
2003	Dave Dickenson	Quarterback	BC Lions
2004	**Casey Printers**	Quarterback	BC Lions
2005	Corey Holmes	Running back	Saskatchewan Roughriders
2006	**Geroy Simon**	Slotback	BC Lions
2007	**Kerry Joseph**	Quarterback	Saskatchewan Roughriders
2008	Henry Burris	Quarterback	Calgary Stampeders
2009	Joffrey Reynolds	Running back	Calgary Stampeders
2010	**Henry Burris**	Quarterback	Calgary Stampeders
2011	**Travis Lulay**	Quarterback	BC Lions
2012	Jon Cornish	Running back	Calgary Stampeders
2013	**Jon Cornish**	Running back	Calgary Stampeders
2014	**Solomon Elimimian**	Linebacker	BC Lions
2015	Bo Levi Mitchell	Quarterback	Calgary Stampeders
2016	**Bo Levi Mitchell**	Quarterback	Calgary Stampeders
2017	**Mike Reilly**	Quarterback	Edmonton Eskimos
2018	**Bo Levi Mitchell**	Quarterback	Calgary Stampeders
2019	Cody Fajardo	Quarterback	Saskatchewan Roughriders
2020	Season cancelled – COVID-19		
2021	**Zach Collaros**	Quarterback	Winnipeg Blue Bombers
2022	**Zach Collaros**	Quarterback	Winnipeg Blue Bombers
2023	Brady Oliveira	Running back	Winnipeg Blue Bombers
2024	**Brady Oliveira**	Running back	Winnipeg Blue Bombers
2025	Nathan Rourke	Quarterback	BC Lions

== Most Outstanding Player in the Western Interprovincial Football Union or Western Football Conference (1953–1972) ==
Note: Prior to 1973 the Canadian Football League West Division's Most Outstanding Player was not the winner of the Jeff Nicklin Memorial Trophy, which was a separate award.

Bold indicates a player who went on to win the CFL's Most Outstanding Player Award

Year	Player	Position	Team
Most Outstanding Player in the Western Interprovincial Football Union or Western Football Conference (1946—1972)
1953	**Billy Vessels**	Running back	Edmonton Eskimos
1954	Rollie Miles	Halfback/linebacker/Defensive back	Edmonton Eskimos
1955	Jackie Parker	Halfback/Quarterback/Defensive back	Edmonton Eskimos
1955	Ken Carpenter	Running back	Saskatchewan Roughriders
1956	Jackie Parker	Quarterback	Edmonton Eskimos
1957	**Jackie Parker**	Running back	Edmonton Eskimos
1958	**Jackie Parker**	Quarterback	Edmonton Eskimos
1959	**Johnny Bright**	Running back	Edmonton Eskimos
1960	**Jackie Parker**	Quarterback	Edmonton Eskimos
1961	Jackie Parker	Quarterback	Edmonton Eskimos
1962	Tommy Joe Coffey	Wide receiver	Edmonton Eskimos
1963	Joe Kapp	Quarterback	BC Lions
1964	**Lovell Coleman**	Running back	Calgary Stampeders
1965	**George Reed**	Running back	Saskatchewan Roughriders
1966	Ron Lancaster	Quarterback	Saskatchewan Roughriders
1967	**Peter Liske**	Quarterback	Calgary Stampeders
1968	George Reed	Running back	Saskatchewan Roughriders
1969	George Reed	Running back	Saskatchewan Roughriders
1970	**Ron Lancaster**	Quarterback	Saskatchewan Roughriders
1971	**Don Jonas**	Quarterback	Winnipeg Blue Bombers
1972	Mack Herron	Running back	Winnipeg Blue Bombers
