= Dave Knechtel =

Canadian football player

Profile
- Position: Defensive tackle

Personal information
- Born: September 25, 1945 (age 81); Kitchener, Ontario, Canada

Career information
- University: Waterloo Lutheran

Career history
- 1968–1972: Toronto Argonauts
- 1973: Edmonton Eskimos
- 1974–1978: Winnipeg Blue Bombers

Awards and highlights
- Gruen Trophy (1968)

Dave Knechtel (born September 25, 1945, in Kitchener, Ontario) is a Canadian former professional football defensive tackle who played eleven seasons for three teams in the Canadian Football League.
