= Stan Brown (ice hockey) =

Canadian ice hockey player (1898–1987)

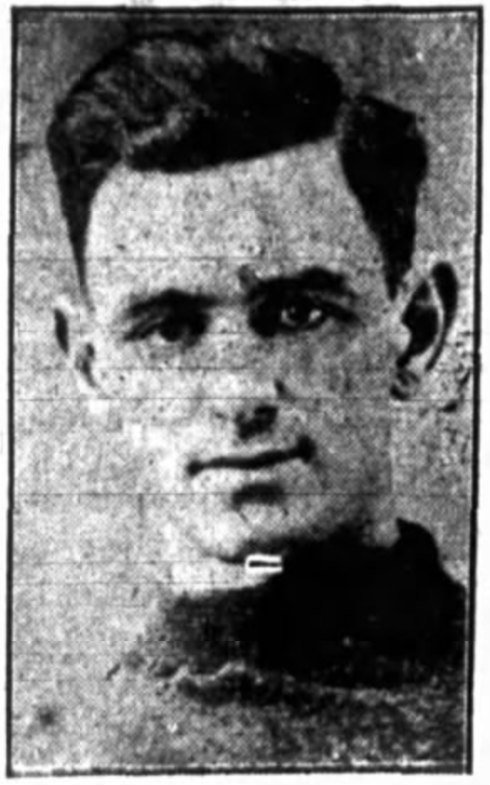
- Born: May 9, 1898 North Bay, Ontario, Canada
- Died: July 7, 1987 (aged 89) North Bay, Ontario, Canada
- Height: 5 ft 10 in (178 cm)
- Weight: 150 lb (68 kg; 10 st 10 lb)
- Position: Defence
- Shot: Left
- Played for: New York Rangers; Detroit Cougars
- Playing career: 1925–1934

Dr. Joseph Alfred Stanislaus Brown (May 9, 1898 – July 7, 1987) was a Canadian ice hockey defenceman. He played in 48 National Hockey League (NHL) games for the New York Rangers and the Detroit Cougars. He also earned a Doctor of Dental Medicine degree from the University of Toronto.

== Playing career ==
=== Minor league hockey ===
Brown played hockey as a teen with the North Bay Arena Stars of the North Bay Hockey League. As a 16-year-old, Brown excelled and quickly join the Ontario Hockey Association Junior ranks, playing for both the Berlin Union Jacks and the St. Michael's Majors. During the 1916–17 season, Brown spent some time in the OHA-Senior playing with the Toronto St. Pats, scoring three goals in eight games. Deciding it was time for college, Brown enrolled in the University of Toronto to study dentistry. He also joined the Toronto Dentals, a local club made up of dentistry students, which had just won the Allan Cup. Brown successfully juggled both his studies and his play on the ice, and after two seasons with the Dentals, finally was offered a roster spot on the University of Toronto's Varsity Blues men's ice hockey team. Brown played on the team for two years, helping the team to win the Allan Cup in 1921 by scoring eight points in the five game playoff. After graduating, Brown decided to follow his hockey career and left dentistry for a later day. He joined the Sault Ste. Marie Greyhounds for the 1922–23 season and put up seven points in his first eight games. He continued to impress and in this second season with the Greyhounds, Brown helped lead the team to their first and his second Allan Cup.

The Greyhounds moved to Detroit for the 1926–27 season in an effort stem the loss of money from the club and Brown moved with them. The Detroit Greyhounds played only six games that season before they and the Northern Ontario Hockey Association Senior-A League folded.

=== NHL ===
Brown didn't have to wait long before lacing up his skates again. The New York Rangers signed Brown as a free agent on December 23, 1926. Brown played the final 24 games of the 1926–27 season with the Blueshirts, scoring six goals and two assists. He played in both playoff games for New York that year, failing to record a point and watching the Boston Bruins go on to the Stanley Cup Finals. On October 10, 1927, Brown was traded to the Detroit Cougars for Harry Meeking and Archie Briden as part of Jack Adams' major restructuring plan for Detroit. Brown played only 24 games of the 1927–28 season in Detroit before again being traded. On February 13, 1928, the Cougars received Pete Palangio and cash from the Montreal Canadiens for Brown.

Brown was quickly assigned to Montreal's farm team the Windsor Bulldogs of the Canadian Professional Hockey League. Brown scored 13 points in his first season as the team was getting ready for a move to the International Hockey League. Brown had his best year during the 1929–30 season, in which the defenceman scored 23 points and logged 22 penalty minutes. Brown played four more seasons in Windsor before retiring after the 1934–35 season.

== Coaching career ==
The first game of the year for the Bulldogs during the 1934–35 season would turn out to be Brown's last, as He had been asked to try his hand at coaching the team that he had been a part of for the past seven years. As the head coach, Brown finished with a 14–23–7 record. Brown decided that coaching wasn't his passion and decided to retire from ice hockey.

=== Regular season and playoffs ===
			Regular season					Playoffs
Season	Team	League	GP	G	A	Pts	PIM	GP	G	A	Pts	PIM
1914–15	North Bay Arena Stars	NBHL	—	—	—	—	—	—	—	—	—	—
1915–16	Berlin Union Jacks	OHA Jr	—	—	—	—	—	—	—	—	—	—
1916–17	Toronto St. Pats	OHA Sr	8	3	0	3	—	—	—	—	—	—
1917–18	Toronto St. Michael's Majors	OHA Jr	—	—	—	—	—	—	—	—	—	—
1918–19	Toronto Dentals	OHA Sr	7	10	6	16	—	2	0	0	0	0
1919–20	Toronto Dentals	OHA Sr	6	1	0	1	—	—	—	—	—	—
1920–21	University of Toronto	OHA Sr	9	5	3	8	—	2	3	3	6	—
1920–21	University of Toronto	Al-Cup	—	—	—	—	—	5	4	4	8	—
1921–22	University of Toronto	OHA Sr	10	7	4	11	—	—	—	—	—	—
1922–23	Sault Ste Marie Greyhounds	NOHA	8	2	5	7	6	2	0	0	0	4
1922–23	Sault Ste. Marie Greyhounds	Al-Cup	—	—	—	—	—	5	4	3	7	4
1923–24	Sault Ste. Marie Greyhounds	NOHA	8	4	5	9	6	7	1	1	2	8
1924–25	Sault Ste. Marie Greyhounds	NOHA	—	—	—	—	—	—	—	—	—	—
1925–26	Sault Ste. Marie Greyhounds	CHL	19	3	5	8	8	—	—	—	—	—
1926–27	Detroit Greyhounds	AHA	6	0	0	0	2	—	—	—	—	—
1926–27	New York Rangers	NHL	24	6	2	8	14	2	0	0	0	0
1927–28	Detroit Cougars	NHL	24	2	0	2	4	—	—	—	—	—
1927–28	Windsor Hornets	Can-Pro	10	3	1	4	2	—	—	—	—	—
1928–29	Windsor Hornets	Can-Pro	40	9	4	13	14	8	0	2	2	8
1929–30	Windsor Bulldogs	IHL	41	13	10	23	22	—	—	—	—	—
1930–31	Windsor Bulldogs	IHL	44	15	6	21	28	6	0	1	1	2
1931–32	Windsor Bulldogs	IHL	47	6	15	21	26	6	1	0	1	2
1932–33	Windsor Bulldogs	IHL	44	6	5	11	26	6	0	2	2	4
1933–34	Windsor Bulldogs	IHL	32	0	1	1	0	—	—	—	—	—
1934–35	Windsor Bulldogs	IHL	1	0	0	0	0	—	—	—	—	—
IHL totals			209	40	37	77	102	—	—	—	—	—
NHL totals			48	8	2	10	18	2	0	0	0	0

== Awards ==
- Named to OHA-Jr. First All-Star Team :1916
- Named to OHA-Sr. First All-Star Team :1919
- Named to OHA-Sr. Second All-Star Team :1921
- Allan Cup Champion: (University of Toronto - 1921) & (Sault Ste. Marie Greyhounds - 1923)
