= Al Irwin =

Canadian football player (born 1943)

Profile
- Position: Receiver

Personal information
- Born: March 16, 1943 (age 83); Toronto, Ontario, Canada

Career information
- College: McMaster University

Career history
- 1964–1965: Montreal Alouettes
- 1966–1968: Toronto Argonauts
- 1969: Edmonton Eskimos
- 1970: Hamilton Tiger-Cats

Awards and highlights
- Gruen Trophy (1964)

Al Irwin (born March 16, 1943) is a former award-winning Canadian Football League player.

A graduate of McMaster University, Irwin joined the Montreal Alouettes in 1964. Catching 11 passes for 156 yards and 2 touchdowns, he won the Gruen Trophy as the best rookie in the east (this during a time when only Canadians could win the award.) He played another season with the Als, catching only 2 passes for 25 yards, and then went on to a 3-year stay with the Toronto Argonauts. As a Double Blue he hauled in 54 passes for 1162 yards and 8 touchdowns. He played one season with the Edmonton Eskimos (26 catches for 445 yards) and a final season with the Hamilton Tiger-Cats (5 catches for 87 yards and 1 touchdown.)
