= Ken Carpenter (gridiron football) =

American gridiron football player (1926–2011)

- Carpenter on a 1950 Bowman football card

No. 84, 20, 91, 99, 70, 81
- Positions: Halfback, end

Personal information
- Born: February 26, 1926; Seaside, Oregon, U.S.
- Died: January 28, 2011 (aged 84); Seaside, Oregon, U.S.
- Listed height: 6 ft 0 in (1.83 m)
- Listed weight: 195 lb (88 kg)

Career information
- High school: Seaside
- College: Oregon State (1946–1949)
- NFL draft: 1950: 1st round, 13th overall pick

Career history

Playing
- Cleveland Browns (1950–1953); Saskatchewan Roughriders (1954–1959); Denver Broncos (1960)

Coaching
- Saskatchewan Roughriders (1960) Head coach; Indianapolis Warriors (1962) Head coach; Toronto Argonauts (1963) Assistant coach; Charleston Rockets (1964) Head coach; Fort Wayne Warriors (1965) Head coach; Charleston Rockets (1966) Head coach; Hartford Charter Oaks (1967) Head coach; Washington Redskins (1968) Assistant coach; Indianapolis Capitols (1969) Head coach; Jersey Tigers (1970–1971) Head coach

Awards and highlights
- NFL champion (1950); Pro Bowl (1951); Jeff Nicklin Memorial Trophy (1955); Dryburgh Memorial Trophy (1955); 3× WIFU All-Star (1955, 1956, 1958); First-team All-PCC (1949); Oregon Sports Hall of Fame (1982); Oregon State Athletics Hall of Fame (1991)

Career NFL/AFL statistics
- Rushing yards: 1,199
- Rushing average: 5
- Receptions: 71
- Receiving yards: 823
- Total touchdowns: 18
- Stats at Pro Football Reference

Kenneth Leroy Carpenter (February 26, 1926 – January 28, 2011) was an American professional football player who was a halfback for the Cleveland Browns of the National Football League (NFL), Saskatchewan Roughriders of the Canadian Football League (CFL), and Denver Broncos of the American Football League (AFL) in the 1950s and 1960. Following his playing career, Carpenter coached during the 1960s in the CFL, NFL and a variety of smaller leagues in the United States.

Carpenter was from Oregon and became a standout playing college football for the Oregon State Beavers from 1946 and 1949. The Browns selected him in the first round of the 1950 NFL draft, making him their first selection since joining the league. Carpenter played with the Browns between 1950 and 1953, a span during which the team won one NFL championship and played in three more. He was named to the Pro Bowl in 1951. Carpenter jumped to the Canadian pro leagues in 1954, quickly becoming a star rusher and receiver for the Roughriders. He led the Western Interprovincial Football Union in scoring in 1955 and won the league's most valuable player award. He was named a divisional all-star in 1955, 1956 and 1958.

Carpenter was named head coach of the Roughriders in 1960, but was not successful in that role. He then returned to playing, spending part of the 1960 season with the Denver Broncos of the new American Football League. A series of jobs coaching teams in the United Football League, the Continental Football League and Atlantic Coast Football League followed, interrupted by one year as an assistant for the NFL's Washington Redskins in 1968. After retiring from football, Carpenter worked as the head of recreation at the Indiana Department of Correction. He was inducted into the Oregon Sports Hall of Fame in 1982 and into the Oregon State University Athletics Hall of Fame in 1991.

== Early life and college ==
Carpenter grew up in Seaside, Oregon, and attended his local Seaside High School. After graduating, he enrolled at Oregon State College in Corvallis, Oregon. He played as a halfback for the Oregon State Beavers football team between 1946 and 1949. Oregon State finished with a 7–1–1 win–loss–tie record in his freshman year under head coach Lon Stiner and played in the Pineapple Bowl after finishing 5–4–3 in 1948, his junior season.

Carpenter as a collegian at Oregon State College.

Carpenter rushed for 1,003 yards in 1949. It was the third-best total in the Pacific Coast Conference and the first time an Oregon State player had eclipsed 1,000 yards of rushing. Carpenter played in the annual East–West Shrine Game in January 1950 and the College All-Star Game, a now-defunct annual matchup between the National Football League (NFL) champion and a selection of the country's best senior college players of the prior year.

== Professional career ==
The Cleveland Browns of the NFL selected Carpenter 13th overall in the first round of the 1950 draft, making him their first pick since joining the league after the dissolution of the old All-America Football Conference. Cleveland ended the regular season with a 10–2 record in Carpenter's rookie year and won the NFL championship. The team advanced to the championship game again the following year, but lost to the Los Angeles Rams. Carpenter had a strong season, rushing for 118 yards in a game against the Chicago Cardinals and ending the year with six touchdowns. Those performances, in addition to a touchdown run late in the championship game, helped earn him a spot in the Pro Bowl, football's all-star game.

Two further championship-game losses followed in 1952 and 1953, both against the Detroit Lions. With the Browns, Carpenter played as a halfback opposite Dub Jones as part of an offense that featured quarterback Otto Graham, fullback Marion Motley and ends Mac Speedie and Dante Lavelli. He helped replenish Cleveland's backfield following the retirement of Edgar Jones, Bill Boedeker and Ara Parseghian after the 1949 season.

Carpenter, who had been a second-string halfback to Ray Renfro in the 1953 season, decided to jump to the Western Interprovincial Football Union (WIFU, one of the forerunners of the Canadian Football League) in 1954, signing with the Saskatchewan Roughriders that June. He was one of a number of NFL players who departed in the mid-1950s for Canada after player salaries declined and made playing Canadian football more attractive. In his first year in Saskatchewan, Carpenter scored nine touchdowns and had 1,068 combined rushing and receiving yards as a dual-threat end. He also led the WIFU in kickoff returns, with a 39-yard average. The Roughriders finished the regular season with a 10–4–2 record for second place in the league. While the team made the playoffs, the Roughriders lost in a WIFU semifinal.

Carpenter had another strong season in 1955, when the Roughriders again finished in second place in the WIFU with a 10–6 record and again lost in the WIFU semi-final. His 18 touchdowns for 90 points set a WIFU record and won him the Dave Dryburgh Memorial Trophy, given to the West's top scorer. He was the only unanimous selection by sportswriters to the annual WIFU all-star team. He also won the Jeff Nicklin Memorial Trophy, given annually to the WIFU's most valuable player.

Carpenter had the best season of his Canadian career statistically in 1956, when he rushed for 727 yards, had 784 receiving yards and added 14 touchdowns. Saskatchewan posted a 10–6 record for the second season in a row and lost in a divisional final series. Carpenter was again named a WIFU all-star.

Slowed by injury, Carpenter's production declined in the 1957 season. He was limited mostly to receiving the following year after the Roughriders acquired halfback Cookie Gilchrist, but he was nevertheless named a WIFU all-star again as an end. Carpenter's output fell in 1959 to 490 total yards, his final season as a player in Saskatchewan.

== Coaching career ==
The Roughriders named Carpenter their head coach after the 1959 season. The appointment was a surprise because of Carpenter's lack of coaching experience, but he got the job over Hamilton Tiger-Cats assistant Jack Jacobs and former Baylor University head coach George Sauer because of his familiarity with the team and his rivals' high salary demands. He was also recommended by his former Browns teammate Speedie, who had jumped to the CFL. Carpenter's one year of coaching in Saskatchewan was unsuccessful, however. The team won just two games, and Carpenter resigned in November, saying he was looking at a possible assistant coaching job with the Denver Broncos, a team in the new American Football League (AFL). Carpenter instead became an end for the Broncos for part of the 1960 season, catching 29 passes for 350 yards.

Carpenter resumed his coaching career in 1962, taking a job as the head coach of the Indianapolis Warriors, a team in the United Football League. He spent most of the 1960s coaching in the UFL and CFL, a pair of smaller leagues that struggled to compete with the NFL and AFL. In 1968, however, he joined the NFL's Washington Redskins as an assistant coach after his former Browns teammate Otto Graham became head coach. He left that job the following year and was coach of the Jersey Tigers in the minor-league Atlantic Coast Football League for two seasons.

== Later life and death ==
Following his coaching career, Carpenter worked as the director of recreation for the Indiana Department of Correction. He was inducted into the Oregon Sports Hall of Fame in 1982 and into the Oregon State University Athletics Hall of Fame in 1991.

Carpenter passed in 2011 surrounded by family in Washington State, to join his wife Doris who had previously passed. He was survived by a son (Kenny) and a daughter (Kimberley). Kimberley currently lives in Washington State with her two daughters and her brother resides in Indiana with his wife and son.

== See also ==
- List of American Football League players
- CFL Yards Leaders
