= Gary W. C. Williams =

Canadian football player

Profile
- Position: Running back

Personal information
- Born: 1936 (age 89–90); Campbellford, Ontario, Canada

Career information
- CJFL: Toronto Parkdale Lions

Career history
- 1957 1958: Toronto Argonauts; Calgary Stampeders

Awards and highlights
- Gruen Trophy (1957)

Gary W. C. Williams is a former award-winning Canadian Football League player.

A graduate of the Toronto Parkdale Lions junior program, Williams played 13 games for the Toronto Argonauts in 1957. He rushed once for 2 yards, and caught 1 pass for a touchdown. It was his 72 punt returns for 424 yards (a 5.9 yards average) that won him the Gruen Trophy as the Eastern Conference (the Big Four) rookie of the year. This was when the trophy was awarded only to Canadian players. He was cut during the 1958 training camp, playing only 1 year, and then played 1 game for the Calgary Stampeders in 1958.
