= Gruen Trophy =

Canadian Football League trophy

The Gruen Trophy is a Canadian Football League trophy, formerly given to the most outstanding Canadian rookie in the East Division. The award, sponsored by the Gruen Watch Co. and inaugurated in 1946, was discontinued and the trophy retired in 1973, as the CFL chose to award the Schenley Award to the best rookie, regardless of nationality.

Prior to 1959, rookie players who were Canadian and had played only junior or high school football were eligible. This was changed to include university athletes when future Hall-of-Famer Russ Jackson, a graduate of McMaster University, began his career but did not win the award.

== Winners ==
- 1972 – Bob Richardson (OL), Hamilton Tiger-Cats
- 1971 – Jim Foley (SB), Montreal Alouettes
- 1970 – Jim Corrigall (DL), Toronto Argonauts
- 1969 – Al Phaneuf (DB), Montreal Alouettes
- 1968 – Dave Knechtel (DL), Toronto Argonauts
- 1967 – Wayne Giardino (LB), Ottawa Rough Riders
- 1966 – Mike Wadsworth (DL), Toronto Argonauts
- 1965 – Terry Evanshen (WR), Montreal Alouettes
- 1964 – Al Irwin (WR), Montreal Alouettes
- 1963 – Rick Black (P/FB), Ottawa Rough Riders
- 1962 – Whit Tucker (WR), Ottawa Rough Riders
- 1961 – Gino Berretta (OE/P), Montreal Alouettes
- 1960 – Bill Mitchell (G/LB), Toronto Argonauts
- 1959 – Joe Poirier (DB), Ottawa Rough Riders
- 1958 – Ron Brewer (LB), Toronto Argonauts
- 1957 – Gary W.C. Williams (HB), Toronto Argonauts
- 1956 – Tommy Grant (RB), Hamilton Tiger-Cats
- 1955 – Ed Mularchyk (E), Ottawa Rough Riders
- 1954 – Ron Howell (WR), Hamilton Tiger-Cats
- 1953 – Bob Dawson (RB), Hamilton Tiger-Cats
- 1952 – John Fedosoff (RB), Toronto Argonauts
- 1951 – Bruno Bitkowski (C/DE) Ottawa Rough Riders
- 1950 – Bob McDonald (RB), Hamilton Tiger-Cats
- 1949 – Jim Loreno (HB), Hamilton Wildcats
- 1948 – Keith English (E), Montreal Alouettes
- 1947 – Nelson Greene (FB), Ottawa Rough Riders
- 1946 – Bernie Brennan (HB), Ottawa Rough Riders
