= Doug Brightwell =

American gridiron football player (born 1928)

Profile
- Position: Centre

Personal information
- Born: October 12, 1928 (age 98); Rosenberg, Texas, U.S.
- Listed height: 5 ft 11 in (1.80 m)
- Listed weight: 220 lb (100 kg)

Career information
- High school: Ingleside (Texas); Alvin (Texas)
- College: TCU
- NFL draft: 1949: 6th round, 56th overall pick

Career history
- 1949: Saskatchewan Roughriders
- 1950: Edmonton Eskimos

Awards and highlights
- CFL West All-Star (1949)

James Douglas Brightwell (born October 12, 1928) is an American former professional football player who played for the Saskatchewan Roughriders and Edmonton Eskimos in Canada. He played college football at Texas Christian University from 1945 to 1948. He was drafted by the Pittsburgh Steelers in 1948, for the 1949 season, but instead decided to play professionally in Canada.
