= Gino Berretta =

Italian gridiron football player (born 1942)

Profile
- Position: Kicker

Personal information
- Born: October 5, 1942 (age 84); Pisa, Italy

Career information
- College: none - Marymount High School

Career history
- 1961: Montreal Alouettes
- 1962: NDG Maple Leafs
- 1963–1966: Montreal Alouettes
- 1967: Montreal Beavers
- 1968: Ottawa Rough Riders
- 1969: Montreal Alouettes

Awards and highlights
- 1961 - Gruen Trophy - Outstanding Eastern Rookie

Giovanni "Gino" Berretta is a former award-winning kicker in the Canadian Football League (CFL).

== Football career ==
A native of Pisa, Italy, Berretta went from Marymount High School in Notre-Dame-de-Grâce to the ranks of local professional soccer, where he was scouted by the Montreal Alouettes. At only 19 years old he suited up for his rookie season in 1961. In eight games he managed a respectable 40.3 yards per punt average, yet he was cut by the Als, even though he would go on to win the Gruen Trophy as the best rookie in the east (at a time when only Canadians could win the award.)

He spent 1962 in the junior ranks with the top local team, the NDG Maple Leafs, and was back in an Als uniform for 1963. He had a good season as a punter, kicker and handling kickoffs. Even though he also caught four passes for 61 yards and a touchdown, Berretta represented a new type of player: the kicking specialist. In 1964 he made only one of nine field goal attempts, and became the punter for 1964 thru to 1966. His average dropped to 38.1 yards in 1966 and as a result he ended playing all of 1967 with the Montreal Beavers of the Continental Football League. 1968 saw him play three games as a backup punter for the Grey Cup champion Ottawa Rough Riders. Finally, his career ended in 1969 with seven final games with the Alouettes.

After his football days Berretta completed his education in orthosis and prosthesis and became owner of J.E. Hanger, a Quebec company that is a leader in the sales of orthopedic, prosthetic and surgical appliances.

== Soccer career ==
Berretta played in the National Soccer League with Montreal Cantalia. In 1964, he was selected to play in a friendly match against Crystal Palace F.C. with Montréal Italica.
