= Johnny Bell (Canadian football) =

Canadian football player

Profile
- Position: End

Personal information
- Born: October 4, 1921; Montreal, Quebec
- Died: August 17, 1998 (aged 76); Melville, Saskatchewan
- Listed height: 6 ft 4 in (1.93 m)
- Listed weight: 190 lb (86 kg)

Career history
- 1946–1952: Regina/Saskatchewan Roughriders

John Neil Bell (October 4, 1921 – August 17, 1998) was a Canadian professional football player who played for the Regina/Saskatchewan Roughriders from 1946 to 1952. He played junior football for the Parkdale Lions. In 1998, he was inducted into the Roughriders' Plaza of Honour. He died earlier that year of a heart condition, aged 76.
