= Bernie Brennan =

Canadian football player (1927–2026)

Profile
- Position: Halfback

Personal information
- Born: October 1, 1927; Deseronto, Ontario, Canada
- Died: September 14, 2026 (aged 98); Ottawa, Ontario, Canada

Career information
- College: St. Patrick's High School (Ottawa); Ontario Veterinarian College; Ontario Agricultural College

Career history
- 1946–47: Ottawa Rough Riders
- 1947–51: Ontario Veterinarian College
- 1951: Ottawa Rough Riders

Awards and highlights
- Grey Cup champion (1951); Gruen Trophy (1946)

Bernard Francis Brennan (October 1, 1927 – September 24, 2026) was a Canadian Football League player.

== Biography ==
Coming straight out of St. Patrick's High School and at the age of 19, Brennan joined the Ottawa Rough Riders in 1946 and won the first Gruen Trophy for best rookie in the eastern Big Four. After one more season with the Riders he returned to school, studying veterinary medicine at Ontario Veterinarian College at the Ontario Agricultural College. He was a star with their football team, enshrined in the Guelph Gryphons Sports Hall of Fame in 1991. He then returned to the Rough Riders in 1951, helping them win a Grey Cup championship.

Brennan was also a skilled hockey player, playing for the 1947-48 Kemptville Royals, a championship senior men's hockey team in the St. Lawrence League and the Ottawa District Hockey Association, and the Brockville Magedomas in 1951.

After his playing days he became director of Rideau Carleton Raceway, where he was appointed track veterinarian. Brennan was a member of the Ontario Racing Commission. He has been elected into the North Grenville Sports Hall of Fame.

Brennan died in Ottawa on September 24, 2026, at the age of 98.
