= Jack Harper (Canadian football) =

Canadian football player (1927–2003)

Profile
- Position: Halfback

Personal information
- Born: 1927; Hamilton, Ontario, Canada
- Died: August 18, 2003 (aged 76); Hamilton, Ontario, Canada

Career history
- 1948: Hamilton Tigers
- 1949–52: Montreal Alouettes
- 1953–54: Saskatchewan Roughriders
- 1955: Toronto Argonauts

Awards and highlights
- Grey Cup champion (1949); CFL All-Star (1948)

John Louis Harper (1927 – August 18, 2003) was a Grey Cup champion and All-Star Canadian Football League player. He was a halfback.

Harper started out with the Hamilton Tigers of the Ontario Rugby Football Union and had an All-Star season in 1948, leading his union in scoring with 60 points and tying Virgil Wagner for the national title. The Montreal Alouettes signed him, and fellow All-Star quarterback Frank Filchock, away from Hamilton in 1949 and these two stars were at the heart of the Als first ever Grey Cup victory that season. After 3 more seasons in Montreal, Harper played with the Saskatchewan Roughriders for two seasons, and finished his career with 6 games for the Toronto Argonauts in 1955. He died in 2003.
