= 1917 Allan Cup =

Canadian senior ice hockey championship

The Allan Cup trophy

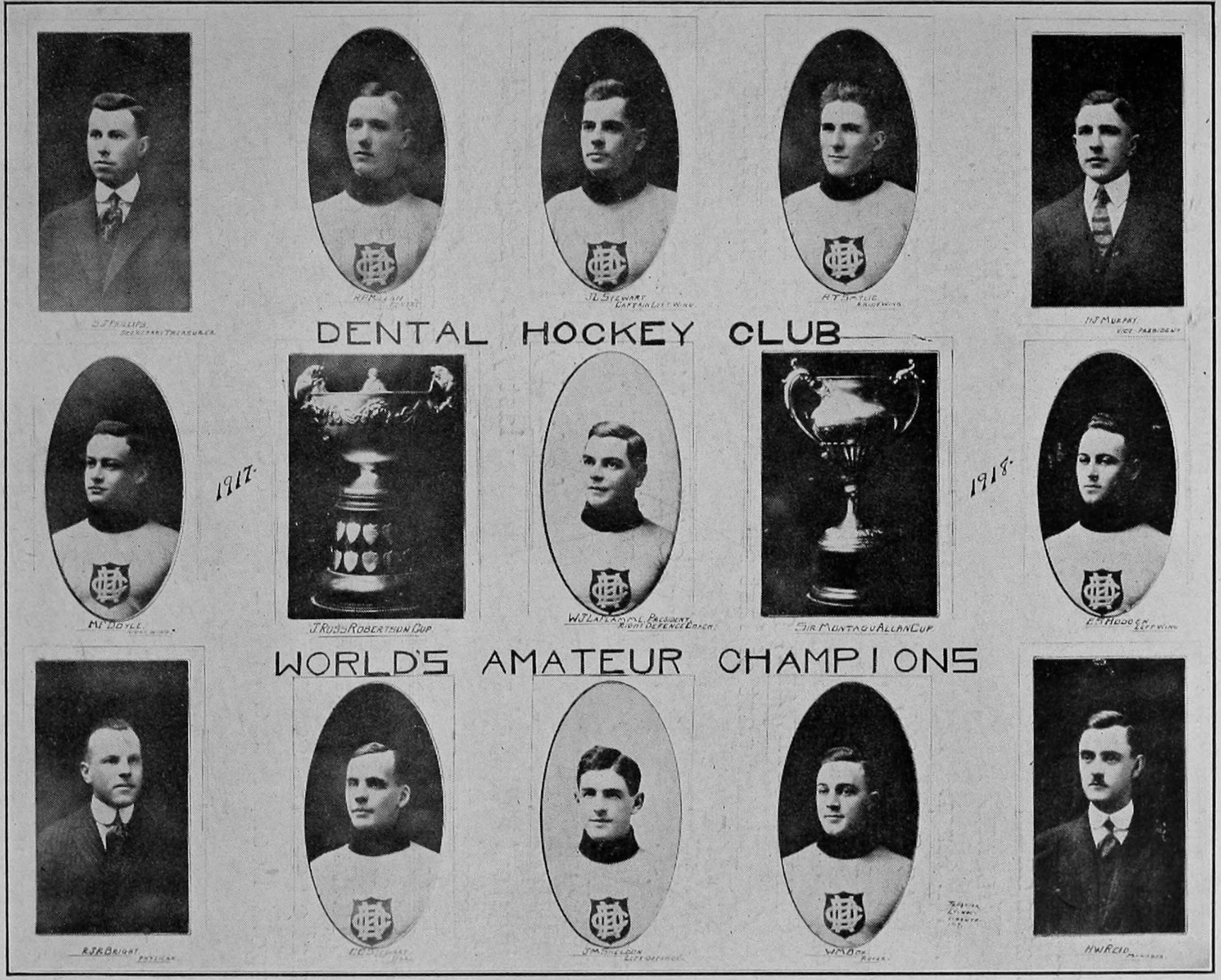
Toronto Dentals.

The 1917 Allan Cup was the Canadian senior ice hockey championship for the 1916–17 season. The title was first held by the Winnipeg Victorias who won their league and two challenges, before losing in the final challenge to the Toronto Dentals.

== League championship ==
The defending 1916 Allan Cup champions, Winnipeg 61st Battalion, did not compete due to the war. As champions of the Winnipeg Patriotic League, the Winnipeg Victorias take over the Allan Cup title.

== First challenge ==
The Winnipeg Victorias were challenged by the Winnipeg Union Canadienne, Winnipeg & District League champions. The series took place in Winnipeg, Manitoba.

- Winnipeg Victorias (Allan Cup holder)
- Winnipeg Union Canadienne

(Challenger)

=== Results ===
Winnipeg Victorias 13 - Winnipeg Union Canadienne 6
Winnipeg Victorias 9 - Winnipeg Union Canadienne 5

Winnipeg Victorias win the series 22-11 and retain the Allan Cup.

== Second challenge ==
The Winnipeg Victorias received a challenge from the Winnipeg 221st Battalion, Manitoba Military League champions. The series took place in Winnipeg, Manitoba.

- Winnipeg Victorias (Allan Cup holder)
- Winnipeg 221st Battalion

(Challenger)

=== Results ===
Winnipeg Victorias 5 - Winnipeg 221st Battalion 4
Winnipeg Victorias 6 - Winnipeg 221st Battalion 1

Winnipeg Victorias win the series 11-5 and retain the Allan Cup.

== Third challenge ==
The Winnipeg Victorias received a challenge from the Port Arthur 141st Battalion, Thunder Bay Senior champions. Played in Winnipeg, Manitoba.

- Winnipeg Victorias (Allan Cup holder)
- Port Arthur 141st Battalion

(Challenger)

=== Results ===
Winnipeg Victorias 5 - Port Arthur 141st Battalion 1
Winnipeg Victorias 5 - Port Arthur 141st Battalion 4

Winnipeg Victorias win the series 10-5 and retain the Allan Cup.

== Fourth challenge ==
Winnipeg Victorias received a challenge from the Toronto Dentals, OHA Senior champions. Played in Winnipeg, Manitoba.

- Winnipeg Victorias (Allan Cup holder)
- Toronto Dentals (Challenger)

=== Results ===
Toronto Dentals 9 - Winnipeg Victorias 6
Winnipeg Victorias 6 - Toronto Dentals 4

Toronto Dentals take the Allan Cup, winning the series 13-goals-to-12.
