= Bill Ordway =

American football coach

Biographical details
- Born: May 8, 1917; Mandan, North Dakota, U.S.
- Died: September 7, 1999 (aged 82); Arlington, Texas, U.S.

Playing career

Football
- 1936–1938: North Dakota
- 1946: Winnipeg Blue Bombers
- Position: Fullback

Coaching career (HC unless noted)

Football
- 1949–1950: Jamestown

Basketball
- 1954–1961: Juneau-Douglas HS
- 1961–1965: Alaska
- 1968–1969: Glassboro State

Baseball
- 1966–1967: Lewis–Clark State

Head coaching record
- Overall: 5–11 (college football); 26–51 (college basketball); 26–21 (college baseball)

Allan William Ordway (May 8, 1917 – September 7, 1999) was an American gridiron football player and coach of football, basketball, and baseball. He served as the head football coach at Jamestown College—now known as the University of Jamestown—in Jamestown, North Dakota from 1949 to 1950 seasons, compiling a record of 5–11.

Ordway played football for the Winnipeg Blue Bombers of the Canadian Football League (CFL) in the early 1940s.

He died of a rare lung disease, pseudomonas, in 1999. He had been in declining health in the recent years leading up to his death. He was cremated with his ashes scattered at a park.

== Head coaching record ==
=== College football ===
Year	Team	Overall	Conference	Standing	Bowl/playoffs
Jamestown Jimmies (North Dakota Intercollegiate Conference) (1949–1950)
1949	Jamestown	3–5	3–2	T—4th	
1950	Jamestown	2–6	2–4	6th	
Jamestown:		5–11	5–6		
Total:		5–11			
