= Don Knowles =

Profile
- Position: Halfback

Personal information
- Born: 1927; Sarnia, Ontario, Canada
- Died: October 19, 2017 (aged 89–90); Toronto, Ontario, Canada

Career information
- College: Sarnia Collegiate Institute and Technical School

Career history
- 1946–50: Sarnia Imperials
- 1950–51: Winnipeg Blue Bombers
- 1953: Sarnia Imperials
- 1954: BC Lions

Awards and highlights
- CFL All-Star (1949); Imperial Oil Trophy (1949)

Donald Gordon "Sleepy" Knowles (1927 – October 19, 2017) was a halfback in the Ontario Rugby Football Union.

Coming straight from high school, Knowles played for his hometown Sarnia Imperials from 1946 to 1950, with his finest season being 1949, when he was an all-star and won the Imperial Oil Trophy as OFRU most valuable player. He later played two seasons with the Winnipeg Blue Bombers, returned to Sarnia for a season, and finished his football career playing a game for the 1954 inaugural BC Lions team.

In 1990 he was elected to the Sarnia Lambton Sports Hall of Fame. He died in 2017.
