= John Fedosoff =

Canadian football player (1932–2023)

Johnny Fedosoff
Profile
- Positions: Halfback, Defensive back

Personal information
- Born: November 19, 1932; Canora, Saskatchewan, Canada
- Died: February 16, 2023 (aged 90); Peterborough, Ontario, Canada

Career information
- College: none - Mimico High School, Mimico, Ontario

Career history
- 1952–54: Toronto Argonauts
- 1955–57: Hamilton Tiger-Cats
- 1958: Saskatchewan Roughriders
- 1958: Montreal Alouettes

Awards and highlights
- 2× Grey Cup champion (1952, 1957); Gruen Trophy (1952); CFL East All-Star (1955)

John Fedosoff (November 19, 1932 – February 16, 2023) was a Grey Cup champion Canadian Football League player.

Coming straight out of Mimico High School he joined the Toronto Argonauts in 1952 and won the Gruen Trophy for best rookie in the eastern Big Four (no stats were kept and only Canadians were eligible). He also won the Grey Cup that year. A versatile two-way player, in 1955 he joined the Hamilton Tiger-Cats and had his best year, rushing for 241 yards and 4 touchdowns, and intercepting 3 passes (which was good for an All-Star selection on defence). He also won his second Grey Cup in 1957 with the Ti-cats. He joined his home province Saskatchewan Roughriders in 1958, also playing two games with the Montreal Alouettes that season before retiring.

Fedosoff died February 16, 2023, in Peterborough, Ontario, at the age of 90.
