= Bill Wusyk =

Canadian football player (1918–1975)

Profile
- Positions: Flying Wing, Kicker, Quarterback

Personal information
- Born: April 18, 1918; Calgary, Alberta, Canada
- Died: December 12, 1975 (aged 57); Calgary, Alberta, Canada

Career history
- 1936–40: Calgary Bronks
- 1945–48: Calgary Stampeders

Awards and highlights
- Grey Cup champion (1948); Jeff Nicklin Memorial Trophy (1946); CFL All-Star (1946)

Bill Wusyk (April 18, 1918 – December 12, 1975) was a Canadian professional football player.

A native of Calgary, Wusyk joined his hometown Calgary Bronks in 1936, playing five seasons with them. When the team disbanded he tried out with the Vancouver Grizzlies in 1941.

After the war Wusyk joined the newly formed Calgary Stampeders for what would turn out to be a 4-year stay. In 1946 he led the Western Interprovincial Football Union in scoring with 4 converts, 8 field goals and 4 rouges (singles) for 32 points. This won him an all-star and the first Jeff Nicklin Memorial Trophy as best player in the west. He was Cowtown's leading scorer again in 1947 (8 converts, 4 FGs and a rouge for 21 points) and in 1948 he was part of their great first Grey Cup winning team.
