= Bob Sandberg =

American architect

Profile
- Positions: Halfback, Quarterback

Personal information
- Born: January 10, 1922; Rice Lake, Wisconsin, U.S.
- Died: May 8, 2015 (aged 93); St. Cloud, Minnesota, U.S.

Career information
- College: Minnesota

Career history
- 1947–1949: Winnipeg Blue Bombers
- 1951: Saskatchewan Roughriders

Awards and highlights
- CFL All-Star (1947); Jeff Nicklin Memorial Trophy (1947)

Robert Young Sandberg (January 10, 1922 – May 8, 2015) was an American gridiron football player, who later had a career as an architect.

A graduate of University of Minnesota, Sandberg joined the Winnipeg Blue Bombers in 1947. His rookie season was spectacular, as he led the league in scoring, was an all-star, and won the Jeff Nicklin Memorial Trophy as western MVP. His season was capped with a dramatic and heartbreaking Grey Cup defeat. Having played a phenomenal game in the 35th Grey Cup, scoring the Bombers only touchdown, he tried a fake kick in the last minute with the score tied and it didn't work; the Toronto Argonauts won a classic nail-biter 10–9.

His 1948 season was a disappointment, falling to sixth in league scoring, and 1949 was plagued by injuries, leading him to retire. He attempted a comeback with the Saskatchewan Roughriders in 1951, but rushed for only 138 yards and scored only 1 touchdown and missed the Grey Cup game due to the Canadian Rugby Union import rule.

After his career in football, Sandberg practiced as an architect in Hibbing, Minnesota, heading his own firm Robert Y. Sandberg & Assocs. Inc; he was a member of the American Institute of Architects. He retired in 1990 and died on May 8, 2015.
