= Johnny Aguirre =

American football player (1919–2007)

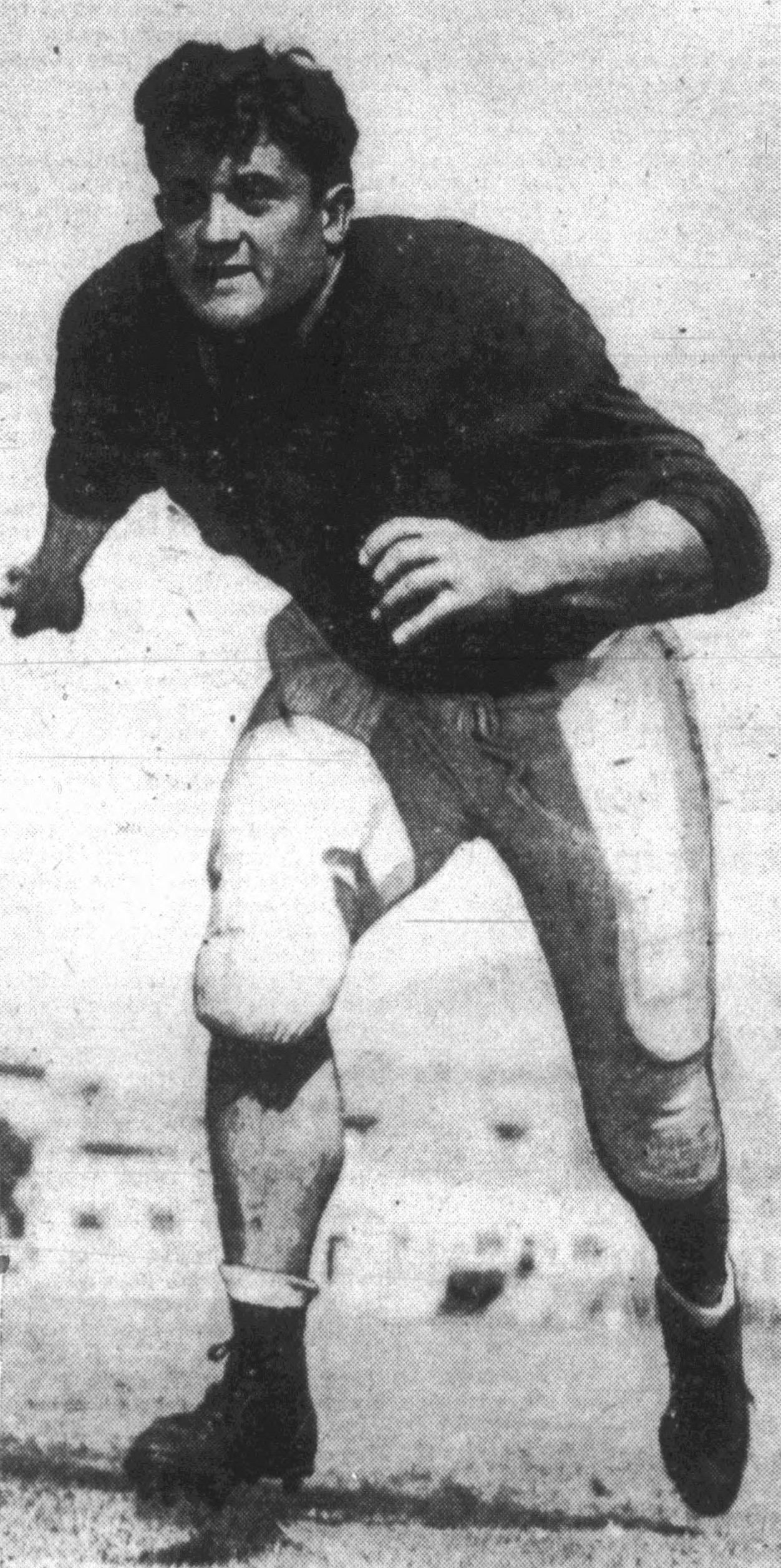
- Aguirre, circa 1946

Profile
- Position: Tackle

Personal information
- Born: August 22, 1919; San Francisco, California, U.S.
- Died: November 2007 (aged 88); Kelowna, British Columbia, Canada
- Listed height: 6 ft 0 in (1.83 m)
- Listed weight: 200 lb (91 kg)

Career information
- High school: Galileo HS
- College: Southern California
- NFL draft: 1944: 16th round, 163rd overall pick

Career history
- Calgary Stampeders (1948–1950)

Awards and highlights
- Grey Cup champion (1948)

John Aguirre (born Juanito Aguirre; August 22, 1919 – November 2007) was a Canadian football player who played for the Calgary Stampeders. He won the Grey Cup with them in 1948. From 1948–50, Aguirre played 27 games with the Stampeders.

Previously, Aguirre attended the University of Southern California where he played college football for the USC Trojans. Aguirre was selected in the 16th round of the 1944 NFL draft by the Cleveland Rams with the 163rd overall pick.
