= Jim Loreno =

Profile
- Position: Running back

Personal information
- Born: February 15, 1928; Oshawa, Ontario, Canada
- Died: 1999 (aged 70–71); Oshawa, Ontario, Canada

Career information
- CJFL: Oshawa Red Raiders

Career history
- 1949: Hamilton Wildcats
- 1950: Hamilton Tiger-Cats

Awards and highlights
- Gruen Trophy (1949)

James Roy "Jimmy" Loreno (February 15, 1928 – 1999) was a Canadian Football League running back.

Coming from the junior ranks in Oshawa, he won the Gruen Trophy with the Hamilton Wildcats in 1949 as best rookie in the Big Four. No official statistics were kept then, and only Canadian rookies were eligible for the award.

In 1950 he was under contract to Winnipeg Blue Bombers but ended up returning to the newly renamed Hamilton Tiger-Cats for his final season. He was enshrined in the Oshawa Sports Hall of Fame in 1994, with the following testimonial:

Jimmy was born in Oshawa on February 15, 1928, and began his outstanding athletic career in 1942. Jimmy played softball for the Oshawa Commercials who became 1942 Eastern Ontario Juvenile Champions. Between 1943 and 1946 Jimmy displayed his athletic versatility at the local level by participating in football and boxing, in addition to softball. The Oshawa Red Raiders Football Club (1947-1948) had Jimmy as a member and during this time they won the Junior B Championship and Jimmy was voted the Most Valuable Player. From 1949 - 1951 Jimmy played for the Hamilton Tiger Cats of the Canadian Football League and in 1949 was honoured by his selection as C.F.L. Rookie of the Year, as well as being the recipient of the Tiger Cats' Green Award. In 1952 he returned to the Oshawa Red Raiders Football Club and was again voted Most Valuable Player. From 1954 to 1962 Jimmy was a member of the Oshawa Tony's Softball Team. During this time the team won four Senior B Ontario Championships and competed in the World Softball Championships in 1956. James Roy Loreno is truly a talented athlete deserving of our recognition.

Loreno died in 1999.
