= University of Toronto Faculty of Dentistry =

Dental school of the University of Toronto

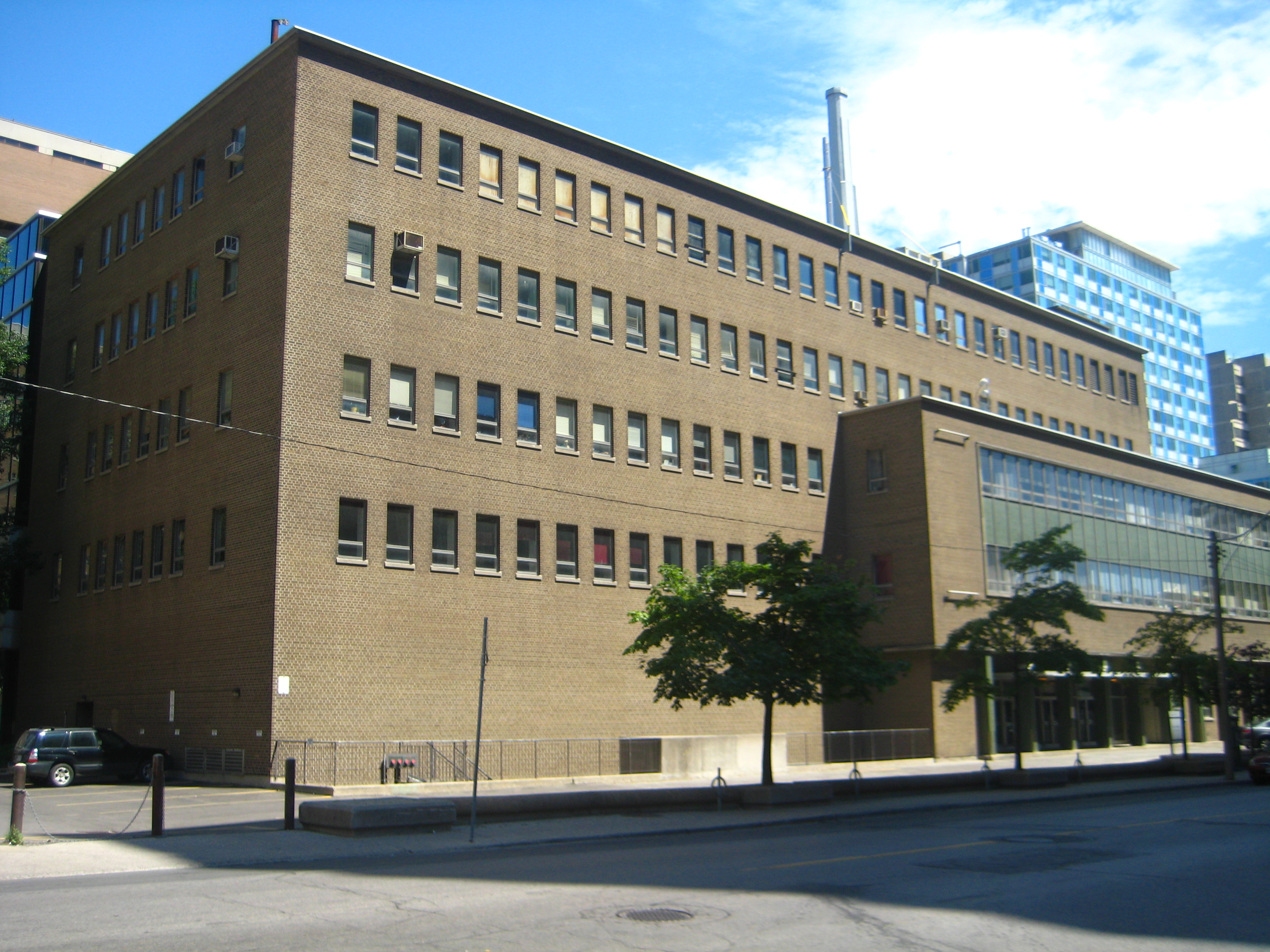
- The Dentistry Building in downtown Toronto
- Former name: Royal College of Dental Surgeons (1875–1925)
- Type: Public dental school
- Established: 1875; 151 years ago
- Parent institution: University of Toronto
- Dean: Laura Tam (interim)
- Students: 559
- Location: Toronto, Ontario, Canada; 43.6563°N 79.3871°W
- Website: dentistry.utoronto.ca

The Faculty of Dentistry is the dental school of the University of Toronto, located in downtown Toronto, Ontario, Canada. It is one of the ten dental schools in Canada. It is the largest dental school in Canada with a range of undergraduate and graduate level programs with a total enrolment in the range of 560. The faculty is located in the Discovery District, a district with a high concentration of hospitals and research institutes, at the south end of the university's St. George campus.

== History ==
In 1868, the province of Ontario passed the "Act Respecting Dentistry". This Act granted the Royal College of Dental Surgeons of Ontario (RCDSO) dual responsibilities of licensing and dental education in Ontario. In 1875, the Royal College of Dental Surgeons was founded, with its first semester schedule to start on November 3, 1875. Under the Act, the RCDS could grant a Licentiate of Dental Surgery (LDS), which was not a formal degree, but training that granted those interested in a license to practice dentistry in Ontario. James Branston Willmott was the first Dean of the school. Dr. Willmott, joined by Dr. Luke Teskey were the only two professors guiding the first class of eleven students in 1875–1876. The RCDS established an affiliation with the University of Toronto in 1888, but it was not until 1889 that it granted the Doctor of Dental Surgery (DDS) degrees. In 1925, the RCDS became the Faculty of Dentistry at the University of Toronto.

One of the alumni of the Faculty of Dentistry, Dr. Harold Keith Box, DDS, PhD (1890–1956), was as a stakeholder in establishing the Canadian Dental Association Research Foundation (CDAF), organized by a committee of the Canadian Dental Association. The CDAF was the first of its kind in Canada, an organization that focused on providing funding for dental research projects in Canadian dental schools. Due to his contribution to the establishment of the CDAF and the various publications that emerged from his work, Dr. Harold Keith Box is known as the father of dental research in Canada. The Faculty of Dentistry continued to contribute to dental research initiatives and became a distinguished contributor at the international level. In 1921, International Association of Dental Research had four chapters, one of which was in Toronto (in addition to Chicago, Boston and New York). In 1927, the IADR Toronto Chapter was successful in receiving funds for the first hospital internship that ensured students had four free hours per day so that they could devote time to research.

In 1945, after years of negotiations, three University of Toronto Faculty of Dentistry professors, Dr. Frank Lott, Dr. Harvey Reid and Dr. Roy G. Ellis, in their role as members of the CDA Research Committee, were able to secure funding for dental research from the National Research Council of Canada. This ensured that generations of dental researchers had access to funding. With the continuous flow of funding, the Faculty of Dentistry was able to establish the first Dental Public Health specialty in 1946, and with its inception began a long history of effort in research and initiatives that would influence oral health policies in Canada.

In 2014, the Faculty of Dentistry joined the Toronto Addis Ababa Academic Collaboration (TAAAC), providing support in building capacity for oral health in Ethiopia by creating collaborative teaching opportunities.

In November 2026, Anil Kishen resigned from his position as dean of the faculty following a controversy involving the use of antisemitic imagery.

=== Ice hockey team ===
The faculty of dentistry formerly operated an amateur senior ice hockey team known as the Toronto Dentals, which competed in the Ontario Hockey Association and won the J. Ross Robertson Cup in 1917. The Toronto Dentals also became Canadian national champions with their victory at the 1917 Allan Cup. Alumni of the Toronto Dentals hockey team include Stan Brown, Bert McCaffrey, Glenn Smith, Rod Smylie, Charles Stewart and Harry Watson.

== Curriculum ==
The Faculty offers a number of programs. The undergraduate programs include a four-year internationally recognized dental degree Doctor of Dental Surgery (DDS), and an International Dentist Advanced Placement Program (IDAPP). Graduate studies programs include MSc or PhD with a research option or in one of ten dental specialty training options, including Dental Anesthesia, Dental Public Health, Endodontics, Oral and Maxillofacial Radiology, Oral and Maxillofacial Surgery, Oral and Maxillofacial Pathology and/or Oral Medicine, Orthodontics and Dentofacial Orthopedics, Paediatric Dentistry, Periodontics, and Prosthodontics. Approximately 13 yearly residencies for the dental specialty training are available at several of Toronto's teaching hospitals, namely The Hospital for Sick Children, Mount Sinai Hospital, and Sunnybrook Health Sciences Centre. The Faculty also hosts ongoing onsite and online courses and workshops for dental professionals through their Continuing Dental Education unit.

== Research ==
The Faculty of Dentistry has various research foci, including Biomaterials and Biomedical Engineering, Connective Tissues and Regenerative Medicine, Dental Public Health, Education Research, Microbiology, Oral Pathology and Cancer, and Pain and Neuroscience. In addition, the Faculty of Dentistry, in collaboration with the Faculty of Medicine and the Faculty of Applied Science and Engineering, has established the world-renowned Institute of Biomaterials and Biomedical Engineering (IBBME).

=== Imaging research facility ===
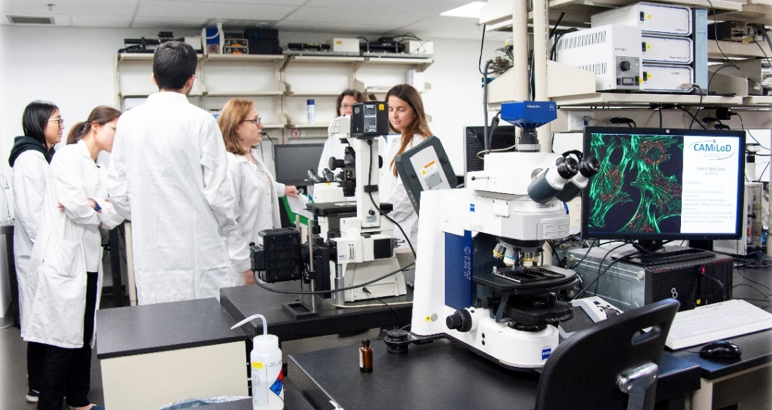
Camilod facility

In 2019, the Faculty of Dentistry opened the Collaborative Advanced Microscopy Laboratories of Dentistry (Camilod), an imaging facility available to researchers in the Toronto area. Camilod uses atomic force microscopy, light and hard electron microscopy, confocal, sliding electron microscopy, epifluorescence microscopes, and wide field microscopy.

== See also ==
- List of dental schools in Canada
