= Bert Iannone =

Canadian football player (1917–1996)

Profile
- Positions: Guard, Tackle

Personal information
- Born: March 10, 1917; Winnipeg, Manitoba, Canada
- Died: February 16, 1996 (aged 78); Langley, British Columbia, Canada
- Listed height: 5 ft 10 in (1.78 m)
- Listed weight: 195 lb (88 kg)

Career history
- 1939–1940: Winnipeg Blue Bombers
- 1941–1941: Saskatchewan Roughriders
- 1945–1947: Winnipeg Blue Bombers
- 1948–1949: Calgary Stampeders
- 1950–1952: Saskatchewan Roughriders

Awards and highlights
- 2× Grey Cup champion (1939, 1948)

Bert Louis Iannone (March 10, 1917 – February 16, 1996) was a Canadian professional football player who played for the Calgary Stampeders, Winnipeg Blue Bombers and Saskatchewan Roughriders. He played from 1939 to 1952. He won the Grey Cup with the Winnipeg Bluebombers in 1939 and with the Calgary Stampeders in 1948 and played in seven grey cup games. He previously played junior football in Winnipeg. He fought in the war for the Royal Canadian Navy from 1940 to 1944.

He coached football for Campion College in Regina, the Regina Rams and for Saint Thomas Moore Secondary in Burnaby BC. He was the Social Credit Party of Canada candidate for Regina in the 1953 Canadian federal election, coming in fourth behind Claude Ellis.

He married Fay Iannone and had 9 children. He died in Langley, British Columbia in 1996, at the age of 79 years old.
