= Nelson Greene (Canadian football) =

Canadian football running back

Nelson "Nellie" Greene
Profile
- Position: Running back

Personal information
- Born: c. 1928 (age 97–98); St. Lambert, Quebec, Canada
- Listed height: 5 ft 10 in (1.78 m)
- Listed weight: 185 lb (84 kg)

Career information
- CJFL: St. Lambert Combines

Career history
- 1947–48: Ottawa Rough Riders
- 1950–54: Saskatchewan Roughriders

Awards and highlights
- Gruen Trophy (1947)

Nelson "Nellie" Greene is a former award-winning Canadian Football League player.

Coming from the St. Lambert Combines junior program, Greene joined the Ottawa Rough Riders in 1947 and won the Gruen Trophy as the Eastern Conference (the Big Four) rookie of the year. No official stats were kept that season and this was when the trophy was awarded only to Canadian players. He moved to the Saskatchewan Roughriders, his best year being 1950 when he rushed for 415 yards. An injury kept him out of the Green Riders 1951 Grey Cup game loss. After his football career, he remained active coaching local high school and junior teams in Regina.
