= Johnny Lake =

Canadian football player

Profile
- Position: Halfback

Personal information
- Born: 1920
- Died: November 25, 1999 (aged 78–79)
- Listed height: 6 ft 1 in (1.85 m)

Career history
- 1939–1943: Winnipeg Blue Bombers

Awards and highlights
- Grey Cup champion (1939, 1941)

John Wark Lake (1920 – November 25, 1999) was a Canadian football player who played for the Winnipeg Blue Bombers. He won the Grey Cup with them in 1939 and 1941.
