= Gerry Walsh =

Australian rules footballer

Personal information
- Full name: Gerry Walsh
- Born: 4 May 1932
- Died: 17 December 2017 (aged 85)
- Original team: Hughesdale
- Height: 173 cm (5 ft 8 in)
- Weight: 70 kg (154 lb)

Playing career^{1}
Years	Club	Games (Goals)
1953	Richmond	1 (0)
- ^{1} Playing statistics correct to the end of 1953.

Gerry Walsh (4 May 1932 – 17 December 2017) was an Australian rules footballer who played with Richmond in the Victorian Football League (VFL).

Walsh left Richmond in 1952, before he had played a senior game, to join Mordialloc. A centreman, he was a member of Mordialloc's 1952 premiership team. He returned to Richmond in 1953 and made one appearance for the club, in their round four loss to St Kilda at Junction Oval. In 1954 he began playing for Oakleigh.
