= Keith English (end) =

Canadian football player (1927–1989)

Profile
- Position: Offensive End

Personal information
- Born: February 13, 1927; Montreal, Quebec, Canada
- Died: January 21, 1989 (aged 61)

Career information
- College: Loyola College

Career history
- 1948–1951: Montreal Alouettes

Awards and highlights
- Grey Cup champion (1949); Gruen Trophy (1948)

Keith English (born February 13, 1927 – January 21, 1989) was a Grey Cup champion and award-winning Canadian Football League player. He was primarily an offensive end but also played on defence.

A graduate of both Loyola High School and Loyola College, English joined his hometown Montreal Alouettes in 1948. Playing 12 regular season games he scored 2 touchdowns and a safety, good enough to win the Gruen Trophy for best rookie in the eastern Big Four (at a time when only Canadians could win the award). In 1949 he was an integral part of the Larks first Grey Cup championship. He retired after only 4 seasons with Montreal, playing 39 games.

He later became an avid curler and golfer, and was a vice-president with McFarlane Son and Hodgson Ltd. In 1972 he was elected into the Loyola College Sports Hall of Fame (now Concordia University). He died on January 21, 1989, aged 61, from undisclosed causes.
