= Martin Gainor =

American gridiron football player (1915–1959)

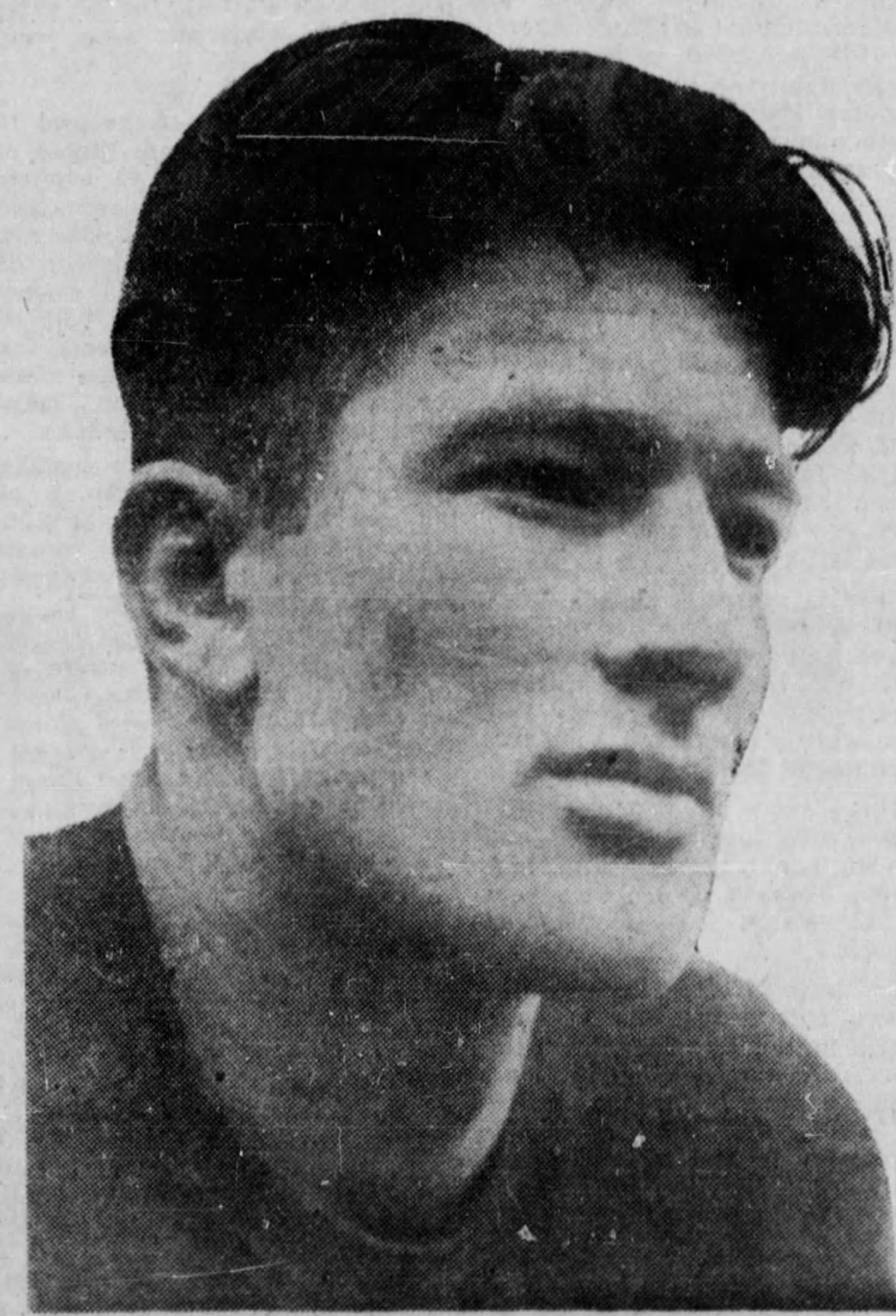
- Gainor, 1939

Personal information
- Born: March 27, 1915; Milnor, North Dakota, U.S.
- Died: December 29, 1959 (aged 44); Milnor, North Dakota, U.S.

Career information
- College: North Dakota

Career history
- 1937–1939: Winnipeg Blue Bombers

Awards and highlights
- Grey Cup champion (1939)

Martin Gainor (March 27, 1915 – December 29, 1959) was an American professional football player who played for the Winnipeg Blue Bombers. He won the Grey Cup with them in 1939. He is a member of the Blue Bombers Hall of Fame.
