= 1947 in Canadian football =

For the first time in Grey Cup history, the same two teams challenged for the trophy for the third consecutive year. But unlike the previous two years, the Toronto Argonauts needed some late game heroics to win their third consecutive title.

== Regular season ==
=== Final regular season standings ===
Note: GP = Games Played, W = Wins, L = Losses, T = Ties, PF = Points For, PA = Points Against, Pts = Points

Western Interprovincial Football Union
| Team | GP | W | L | T | PF | PA | Pts |
|---|---|---|---|---|---|---|---|
| **Winnipeg Blue Bombers** | 8 | 5 | 3 | 0 | 83 | 83 | 10 |
| **Calgary Stampeders** | 8 | 4 | 4 | 0 | 79 | 93 | 8 |
| Regina Roughriders | 8 | 3 | 5 | 0 | 78 | 64 | 6 |

Interprovincial Rugby Football Union
| Team | GP | W | L | T | PF | PA | Pts |
|---|---|---|---|---|---|---|---|
| **Ottawa Rough Riders** | 12 | 8 | 4 | 0 | 170 | 103 | 16 |
| **Toronto Argonauts** | 12 | 7 | 4 | 1 | 140 | 122 | 15 |
| Montreal Alouettes | 12 | 6 | 6 | 0 | 164 | 164 | 12 |
| Hamilton Tigers | 12 | 2 | 9 | 1 | 119 | 204 | 5 |

Ontario Rugby Football Union
| Team | GP | W | L | T | PF | PA | Pts |
|---|---|---|---|---|---|---|---|
| **Hamilton Wildcats** | 10 | 9 | 1 | 0 | 245 | 84 | 18 |
| **Toronto Balmy Beach Beachers** | 10 | 7 | 3 | 0 | 103 | 100 | 14 |
| **Ottawa Trojans** | 10 | 5 | 4 | 1 | 148 | 133 | 11 |
| **Toronto Indians** | 10 | 4 | 5 | 1 | 99 | 120 | 9 |
| Windsor Rockets | 10 | 4 | 6 | 0 | 86 | 138 | 8 |
| Sarnia Imperials | 10 | 0 | 10 | 0 | 60 | 166 | 0 |

- Bold text means that they have clinched the playoffs.

== Grey Cup playoffs ==
Note: All dates in 1947

=== Semifinals ===
**ORFU Semifinal**
Toronto Indians @ Hamilton Wildcats
| Date | Away | Home |
|---|---|---|
| November 7 | Toronto Indians 0 | **Hamilton Wildcats 14** |

- Hamilton advances to the ORFU Final.

**ORFU Semifinal**
Ottawa Trojans @ Toronto Balmy Beach Beachers
| Date | Away | Home |
|---|---|---|
| November 8 | **Ottawa Trojans 16** | Toronto Balmy Beach Beachers 7 |

- Ottawa advances to the ORFU Final.

=== Finals ===
**WIFU Finals – Game 1**
Calgary Stampeders @ Winnipeg Blue Bombers
| Date | Away | Home |
|---|---|---|
| November 1 | Calgary Stampeders 4 | **Winnipeg Blue Bombers 16** |

**WIFU Finals – Game 2**
Winnipeg Blue Bombers @ Calgary Stampeders
| Date | Away | Home |
|---|---|---|
| November 11 | Winnipeg Blue Bombers 3 | **Calgary Stampeders 15** |

**WIFU Finals – Game 3**
Calgary Stampeders @ Winnipeg Blue Bombers
| Date | Away | Home |
|---|---|---|
| November 15 | Calgary Stampeders 3 | **Winnipeg Blue Bombers 10** |

- Winnipeg won the total-point series by 29–22. Winnipeg advances to the Grey Cup game.

**ORFU Final**
Ottawa Trojans @ Hamilton Wildcats
| Date | Away | Home |
|---|---|---|
| November 15 | **Ottawa Trojans 15** | Hamilton Wildcats 3 |

- Ottawa will play the Toronto Argonauts in the Eastern finals.

**IRFU Finals – Game 1**
Toronto Argonauts @ Ottawa Rough Riders
| Date | Away | Home |
|---|---|---|
| November 11 | **Toronto Argonauts 3** | Ottawa Rough Riders 0 |

**IRFU Finals – Game 2**
Ottawa Rough Riders @ Toronto Argonauts
| Date | Away | Home |
|---|---|---|
| November 15 | Ottawa Rough Riders 0 | **Toronto Argonauts 21** |

- Toronto won the total-point series by 24–0. Toronto will play the Ottawa Trojans in the Eastern finals.

=== Eastern Finals ===
Ottawa Trojans @ Toronto Argonauts
| Date | Away | Home |
|---|---|---|
| November 22 | Ottawa Trojans 1 | **Toronto Argonauts 22** |

- Toronto advances to the Grey Cup game.

== Playoff bracket ==
**Quarterfinals**
IRFU | Ottawa Rough Riders | 0-0
IRFU | Toronto Argonauts | 3-22
**EAST**
ORFU | Hamilton Wildcats | 3
ORFU | Ottawa Trojans | 15
WIFU | no quarter final
**WEST**
WIFU | no quarter final

**Semifinals**
IRFU | Toronto Argonauts | 22
ORFU | Ottawa Trojans | 1
WIFU | Winnipeg Blue Bombers | 16-3-10
WIFU | Calgary Stampeders | 4-15-3

**Grey Cup final**
IRFU | Toronto Argonauts | 10
WIFU | Winnipeg Blue Bombers | 9

== Grey Cup Championship ==
November 29 35th Annual Grey Cup Game: Varsity Stadium – Toronto, Ontario
| WIFU Champion | IRFU Champion |
|---|---|
| Winnipeg Blue Bombers 9 | **Toronto Argonauts 10** |
**The Toronto Argonauts are the 1947 Grey Cup Champions**

Needing to beat the clock, the Argos had a quick huddle, and Joe Krol, a Grey Cup hero for many seasons, angled a kick away from the Winnipeg safety, over the goal line and into touch for the winning point as time expired.

== 1947 Eastern (Combined IRFU & ORFU) All-Stars ==
NOTE: During this time most players played both ways, so the All-Star selections do not distinguish between some offensive and defensive positions.

=== 1st Team ===
- QB – Frank Filchock, Hamilton Tigers
- FW – Tony Golab, Ottawa Rough Riders
- HB – Royal Copeland, Toronto Argonauts
- HB – Joe Krol, Toronto Argonauts
- FB – Virgil Wagner, Montreal Alouettes
- E – Joe Farley, Ottawa Trojans
- E – Bert Haigh, Ottawa Rough Riders
- C – Don Loney, Ottawa Rough Riders
- G – Don McKenzie, Toronto Balmy Beach Beachers
- G – Bill Zock, Toronto Argonauts
- T – Herb Trawick, Montreal Alouettes
- T – Hank Christman, Ottawa Rough Riders

=== 2nd Team ===
- QB – Mel Lawson, Hamilton Wildcats
- FW – Don McFarlane, University of Western Ontario
- HB – Bob Paffrath, Toronto Indians
- HB – Jack Perry, University of Western Ontario
- FB – Doug Smylie, Ottawa Trojans
- E – Matt Anthony, Ottawa Rough Riders
- E – Gord Lawson, Hamilton Wildcats
- C – Doug Turner, Toronto Argonauts
- G – Eddie Remigis, Hamilton Tigers
- G – Bud Donald, Hamilton Wildcats
- T – Gerry Duck, University of Western Ontario
- T – Steve Chamko, Windsor Rockets

== 1947 Western (Western Interprovincial Football Union) All-Stars ==
NOTE: During this time most players played both ways, so the All-Star selections do not distinguish between some offensive and defensive positions.

- QB – Stan Stasica, Regina Roughriders
- FW – Del Wardien, Regina Roughriders
- HB – Gabe Patterson, Regina Roughriders
- HB – Paul Rowe, Calgary Stampeders
- FB – Bob Sandberg, Winnipeg Blue Bombers
- E – Johnny Bell, Regina Roughriders
- E – Ken Sluman, Calgary Stampeders
- E – Red Noel, Regina Roughriders
- C – Mel Wilson, Winnipeg Blue Bombers
- G – Doug Drew, Regina Roughriders
- G – Bert Iannone, Winnipeg Blue Bombers
- T – Bob Pullar, Calgary Stampeders
- T – Bob Smith, Winnipeg Blue Bombers

== 1947 Ontario Rugby Football Union All-Stars ==
NOTE: During this time most players played both ways, so the All-Star selections do not distinguish between some offensive and defensive positions.

- QB – Mel Lawson, Hamilton Wildcats
- HB – Bob Cunningham, Toronto Balmy Beach Beachers
- HB – Bill Petrilas, Ottawa Trojans
- DB – Bob Paffrath, Toronto Indians
- E – George Farley, Ottawa Trojans
- E – Gord Lawson, Hamilton Wildcats
- FW – Bill Murmylyk, Hamilton Wildcats
- C – Baz Petry, Toronto Balmy Beach Beachers
- C – Fred Gabriel, Hamilton Wildcats
- G – Don McKenzie, Toronto Balmy Beach Beachers
- G – Bud Donald, Hamilton Wildcats
- T – Steve Chamko, Windsor Rockets
- T – Vic Ghetti, Windsor Rockets

== 1947 Canadian Football Awards ==
- Jeff Russel Memorial Trophy (IRFU MVP) – Virgil Wagner (RB), Montreal Alouettes
- Jeff Nicklin Memorial Trophy (WIFU MVP) - Bob Sandberg (RB), Regina Roughriders
- Gruen Trophy (IRFU Rookie of the Year) - Nelson Greene (FB), Ottawa Rough Riders
- Imperial Oil Trophy (ORFU MVP) - Bob Paffrath - Toronto Indians
