= Don McKenzie (Canadian football) =

Canadian football player (1920–2001)

Profile
- Position: Guard

Personal information
- Born: 1920
- Died: May 2001 (aged 80)
- Listed height: 5 ft 11 in (1.80 m)
- Listed weight: 247 lb (112 kg)

Career history
- 1940–1941, 1950–1953: Toronto Argonauts

Awards and highlights
- 2× Grey Cup champion (1950, 1952)

Donald William "Shanty" McKenzie Sr. (1920 – May 2001) was a Canadian professional football player who played for the Toronto Argonauts. He won the Grey Cup with them in 1950 and 1952. He attended Western Technical-Commercial School in Toronto's west end. He was a veteran of World War II. McKenzie was later the building superintendent of Maple Leaf Gardens, a position he held for 40 years. He died in May 2001, at the age of 80.
