= 1949 in Canadian football =

The Calgary Stampeders had an opportunity to defend their Grey Cup title in 1949, but the Montreal Alouettes returned the trophy to Quebec for just the third time in its history.

== Canadian Football News in 1949 ==
The Edmonton Eskimos rejoined with the WIFU and adopted the colours of gold and green. The WIFU regular season was extended to 14 games, per team.

Wearing helmets became compulsory with the two unions. The Western Canada Rugby Football Union ceased its operations.

== Regular season ==
=== Final regular season standings ===
Note: GP = Games Played, W = Wins, L = Losses, T = Ties, PF = Points For, PA = Points Against, Pts = Points

**Western Interprovincial Football Union**
| Team | GP | W | L | T | PF | PA | Pts |
|---|---|---|---|---|---|---|---|
| **Calgary Stampeders** | 14 | 13 | 1 | 0 | 270 | 77 | 24 |
| **Regina Roughriders** | 14 | 9 | 5 | 0 | 235 | 102 | 17 |
| Edmonton Eskimos | 14 | 4 | 10 | 0 | 93 | 235 | 8 |
| Winnipeg Blue Bombers | 14 | 2 | 12 | 0 | 74 | 258 | 3 |

- Four WIFU games were worth one point in the standings

**Interprovincial Rugby Football Union**
| Team | GP | W | L | T | PF | PA | Pts |
|---|---|---|---|---|---|---|---|
| **Ottawa Rough Riders** | 12 | 11 | 1 | 0 | 261 | 170 | 22 |
| **Montreal Alouettes** | 12 | 8 | 4 | 0 | 295 | 204 | 16 |
| Toronto Argonauts | 12 | 5 | 7 | 0 | 209 | 254 | 10 |
| Hamilton Wildcats | 12 | 0 | 12 | 0 | 147 | 284 | 0 |

**Ontario Rugby Football Union**
| Team | GP | W | L | T | PF | PA | Pts |
|---|---|---|---|---|---|---|---|
| **Hamilton Tigers** | 12 | 10 | 2 | 0 | 228 | 68 | 20 |
| **Sarnia Imperials** | 12 | 8 | 4 | 0 | 142 | 101 | 16 |
| Windsor Rockets | 12 | 5 | 7 | 0 | 142 | 108 | 10 |
| Toronto Balmy Beach Beachers | 12 | 1 | 11 | 0 | 55 | 290 | 2 |

- Bold text means that they have clinched the playoffs.

== Grey Cup playoffs ==
Note: All dates in 1949

=== Finals ===
WIFU Finals – Game 1
Calgary Stampeders @ Regina Roughriders
| Date | Away | Home |
|---|---|---|
| November 5 | Calgary Stampeders 18 | Regina Roughriders 12 |

WIFU Finals – Game 2
Regina Roughriders @ Calgary Stampeders
| Date | Away | Home |
|---|---|---|
| November 11 | Regina Roughriders 9 | Calgary Stampeders 4 |

- Calgary won the total-point series by 22–21. The Stampeders will advance to the Grey Cup game.

ORFU Finals – Game 1
Hamilton Tigers @ Sarnia Imperials
| Date | Away | Home |
|---|---|---|
| November 11 | Hamilton Tigers 6 | Sarnia Imperials 15 |

ORFU Finals – Game 2
Sarnia Imperials @ Hamilton Tigers
| Date | Away | Home |
|---|---|---|
| November 12 | Sarnia Imperials 3 | Hamilton Tigers 20 |

- Hamilton won the total-point series by 26–18. The Tigers will play the Montreal Alouettes in the Eastern finals.

IRFU Finals – Game 1
Montreal Alouettes @ Ottawa Rough Riders
| Date | Away | Home |
|---|---|---|
| November 9 | Montreal Alouettes 22 | Ottawa Rough Riders 7 |

IRFU Finals – Game 2
Ottawa Rough Riders @ Montreal Alouettes
| Date | Away | Home |
|---|---|---|
| November 12 | Ottawa Rough Riders 13 | Montreal Alouettes 14 |

- Montreal won the total-point series by 36–20. The Alouettes will play the Hamilton Tigers in the Eastern finals.

=== Eastern Finals ===
Hamilton Tigers @ Montreal Alouettes
| Date | Away | Home |
|---|---|---|
| November 19 | Hamilton Tigers 0 | Montreal Alouettes 40 |

- The Montreal Alouettes will advance to the Grey Cup game.

== Playoff bracket ==
Quarterfinals
IRFU | Ottawa Rough Riders | 7-13
IRFU | Montreal Alouettes | 22-14
EAST
ORFU | Hamilton Tigers | 6-20
ORFU | Sarnia Imperials | 15-3
2
7
WEST
3
6

Semifinals
IRFU | Montreal Alouettes | 40
ORFU | Hamilton Tigers | 0
WIFU | Calgary Stampeders | 18-4
WIFU | Saskatchewan Roughriders | 12-9

Grey Cup final
IRFU | Montreal Alouettes | 28
WIFU | Calgary Stampeders | 15

== Grey Cup Championship ==
November 26 37th Annual Grey Cup Game: Varsity Stadium – Toronto, Ontario
| WIFU Champion | IRFU Champion |
|---|---|
| Calgary Stampeders 15 | Montreal Alouettes 28 |
The Montreal Alouettes are the 1949 Grey Cup Champions

== 1949 Eastern (Interprovincial Rugby Football Union) All-Stars ==
NOTE: During this time most players played both ways, so the All-Star selections do not distinguish between some offensive and defensive positions.

- QB – Frank Filchock, Montreal Alouettes
- QB – Andy Gordon, Ottawa Rough Riders
- HB – Howie Turner, Ottawa Rough Riders
- HB – Virgil Wagner, Montreal Alouettes
- HB – Royal Copeland, Toronto Argonauts
- E – Robert Hood, Hamilton Wildcats
- E – Ralph Toohy, Montreal Alouettes
- FW – Bob Paffrath, Ottawa Rough Riders
- C – Don Loney, Ottawa Rough Riders
- G – Eddie Michaels, Ottawa Rough Riders
- G – Vince Scott, Hamilton Wildcats
- T – Herb Trawick, Montreal Alouettes
- T – John Wagoner, Ottawa Rough Riders

== 1949 Western (Western Interprovincial Football Union) All-Stars ==
NOTE: During this time most players played both ways, so the All-Star selections do not distinguish between some offensive and defensive positions.

=== 1st Team ===
- QB – Keith Spaith, Calgary Stampeders
- HB – Del Wardien, Saskatchewan Roughriders
- HB – Ken Charlton, Saskatchewan Roughriders
- HB – Vern Graham, Calgary Stampeders
- FB – Sammy Pierce, Winnipeg Blue Bombers
- E – Ezzert Anderson, Calgary Stampeders
- E – Woody Strode, Calgary Stampeders
- C – Mel Wilson, Calgary Stampeders
- G – Mike Kissell, Winnipeg Blue Bombers
- G – Riley Matheson, Calgary Stampeders
- T – Johnny Aguirre, Calgary Stampeders
- T – Mike Cassidy, Saskatchewan Roughriders

=== 2nd Team ===
- QB – Doug Belden, Saskatchewan Roughriders
- HB – Chuck Fenenbock, Edmonton Eskimos
- HB – Normie Kwong, Calgary Stampeders
- HB – Harry Hood, Calgary Stampeders
- FB – Paul Rowe, Calgary Stampeders
- E – Matt Anthony, Saskatchewan Roughriders
- E – Johnny Bell, Saskatchewan Roughriders
- C – Doug Brightwell, Saskatchewan Roughriders
- G – Bud Irving, Winnipeg Blue Bombers
- G – Bert Iannone, Calgary Stampeders
- T – Pat Santucci, Saskatchewan Roughriders
- T – Toar Springstein, Saskatchewan Roughriders

== 1949 Ontario Rugby Football Union All-Stars ==
NOTE: During this time most players played both ways, so the All-Star selections do not distinguish between some offensive and defensive positions.

- QB – Stan Wolkowski, Hamilton Tigers
- HB – Don Knowles, Sarnia Imperials
- HB – Jack Stewart, Hamilton Tigers
- DB – Sylvester Mike, Windsor Rockets
- E – Keith Fisher, Sarnia Imperials
- E – Bill Damiano, Hamilton Tigers
- E – Rube Ainsworth, Hamilton Tigers
- FW – Joe Capriotti, Hamilton Tigers
- C – Jake Gaudaur, Hamilton Tigers
- G – Don McKenzie, Toronto Beaches-Indians
- G – Jack Moreau, Windsor Rockets
- T – Lloyd "Dutch" Davey, Sarnia Imperials
- T – Len Wright, Windsor Rockets

== 1949 Canadian Football Awards ==
- Jeff Russel Memorial Trophy (IRFU MVP) – Royal Copeland (RB), Toronto Argonauts
- Jeff Nicklin Memorial Trophy (WIFU MVP) - Keith Spaith (QB), Calgary Stampeders
- Gruen Trophy (IRFU Rookie of the Year) - Jim Loreno (HB), Hamilton Wildcats
- Dr. Beattie Martin Trophy (WIFU Rookie of the Year) - John Stroppa (HB), Winnipeg Blue Bombers
- Imperial Oil Trophy (ORFU MVP) - Don Knowles - Sarnia Imperials
