= Johnny Bright =

Gridiron football player (1930–1983)

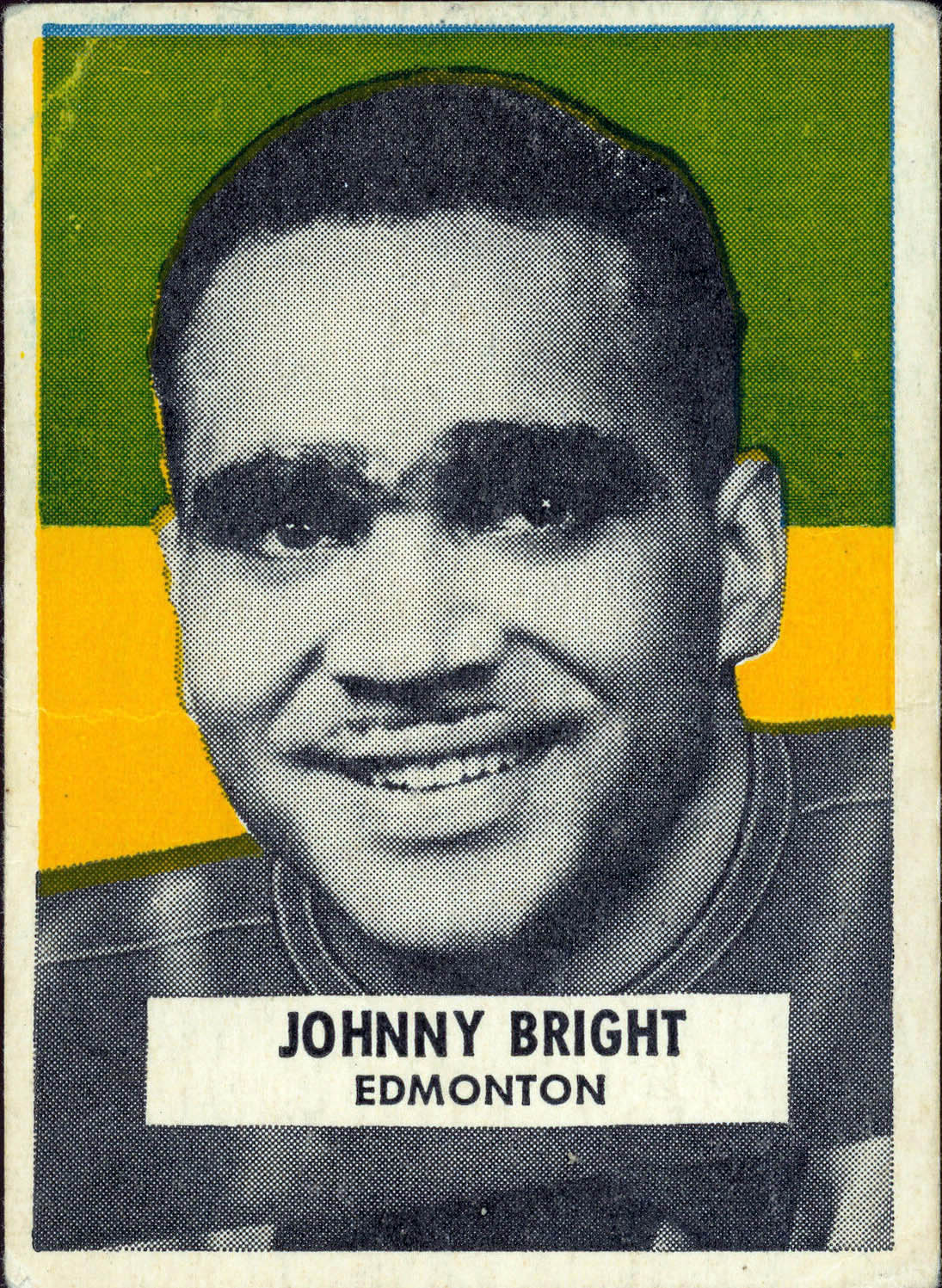
- Bright depicted in a 1959 football card

No. 24
- Positions: Fullback; Linebacker

Personal information
- Born: June 11, 1930; Fort Wayne, Indiana, U.S.
- Died: December 14, 1983 (aged 53); Edmonton, Alberta, Canada
- Listed height: 6 ft 1 in (1.85 m)
- Listed weight: 217 lb (98 kg)

Career information
- High school: Central (Fort Wayne)
- College: Drake (1949–1951)
- NFL draft: 1952: 1st round, 5th overall pick

Career history
- Calgary Stampeders (1952–1954); Edmonton Eskimos (1954–1964)

Awards and highlights
- 3× Grey Cup champion (1954–1956); CFL's Most Outstanding Player (1959); 4× Eddie James Memorial Trophy (1952, 1957–1959); Nils V. "Swede" Nelson Award (1951); 6× CFL West All-Star (1952, 1957–1961); 4× CFL rushing yards leader (1952, 1957–1959); CFL rushing touchdowns leader (1961); Edmonton Elks Wall of Honour (1983); Alberta Sports Hall of Fame (1980); TSN Top 50 CFL Players (19th); First-team All-American (1950); Second-team All-American (1951); Drake Bulldogs No. 43 retired; Edmonton Elks records: Most rushing yards in a career: 9,966; Most rushing yards in a season: 1,722 (1958); Most 100-yard games in a career: 36; Most 100-yard games in a season: 9 (1957)

Career CFL statistics
- Rushing yards: 10,909
- Rushing average: 5.5
- Rushing touchdowns: 70
- Receptions: 132
- Receiving yards: 1,826
- Receiving touchdowns: 1
- Interceptions: 7
- Fumble recoveries: 3
- Canadian Football Hall of Fame
- College Football Hall of Fame

John Dee Bright (June 11, 1930 – December 14, 1983) was an American professional football player in the Canadian Football League (CFL). A troubling racist incident he endured as a college football player in the United States caused rule changes in the National Collegiate Athletic Association (NCAA). After his emigration to Canada, he played a starring role for the Edmonton Eskimos and also became a school principal and an important role model for Black Canadians and aspiring athletes in Edmonton.

Bright played college football for the Drake Bulldogs. He is a member of the Canadian Football Hall of Fame, the College Football Hall of Fame, the Missouri Valley Conference Hall of Fame, the Edmonton Eskimos Wall of Honour, the Alberta Sports Hall of Fame, and the Des Moines Register's Iowa Sports Hall of Fame.

In 1951, Bright was named a first-team All-American, and was awarded the Nils V. "Swede" Nelson Sportsmanship Award. In 1969, Bright was named Drake University's greatest football player of all time. Bright is the only Drake football player to have his jersey number (No. 43) retired by the school, and in June 2006, received honorable mention from ESPN.com senior writer Ivan Maisel, as one of the best college football players to ever wear No. 43. In February 2006, the football field at Drake Stadium was named in his honor. In November 2006, Bright was voted one of the CFL's Top 50 players (No. 19) of the league's modern era by Canadian sports network TSN.

On October 20, 1951, Bright was the victim of an intentional, racially motivated, on-field assault by an opposing college football player from the Oklahoma A&M Cowboys that was captured in a widely disseminated and Pulitzer Prize-winning photo sequence, and eventually came to be known as the "Johnny Bright incident".

== Early life ==
Born in Fort Wayne, Indiana on June 11, 1930, Bright was the second oldest of five brothers. Bright lived with his mother and step father Daniel Bates, brothers, Homer Bright, the eldest, Alfred, Milton, and Nate Bates, in a working class, predominantly African-American neighbourhood in Fort Wayne.

Bright was a three-sport (football, basketball, track and field) star at Fort Wayne's Central High School. Bright, who also was an accomplished softball pitcher and boxer, led Central High's football team to a City title in 1945, and helped the basketball team to two state tournament Final Four appearances.

== Beginning of college football career ==
Following his graduation from Central High in 1947, Bright initially accepted a football scholarship at Michigan State University, but, apparently unhappy with the direction of the Spartans football program, transferred to Drake University in Des Moines, Iowa, where he accepted a track and field scholarship, that allowed him to try out for the football and basketball squads. Bright eventually lettered in football, track, and basketball, during his collegiate career at Drake.

Following a mandatory freshman redshirt year, Bright began his collegiate football career in 1949, rushing for 975 yards and throwing for another 975, to lead the nation in total offense during his sophomore year, as the Drake Bulldogs finished their season at 6–2–1. In Bright's junior year, the halfback/quarterback rushed for 1,232 yards and passed for 1,168 yards, setting an NCAA record for total offense (2,400 yards) in 1950, and again led the Bulldogs to a 6–2–1 record.

Bright's senior year began with great promise. Bright was considered a pre-season Heisman Trophy candidate, and was leading the nation in both rushing and total offense with 821 and 1,349 yards respectively, when the Drake Bulldogs, winners of their previous five games, faced Missouri Valley Conference foe Oklahoma A&M, at Lewis Field (now Boone Pickens Stadium) in Stillwater, Oklahoma, on October 20, 1951.

== "Johnny Bright Incident" ==
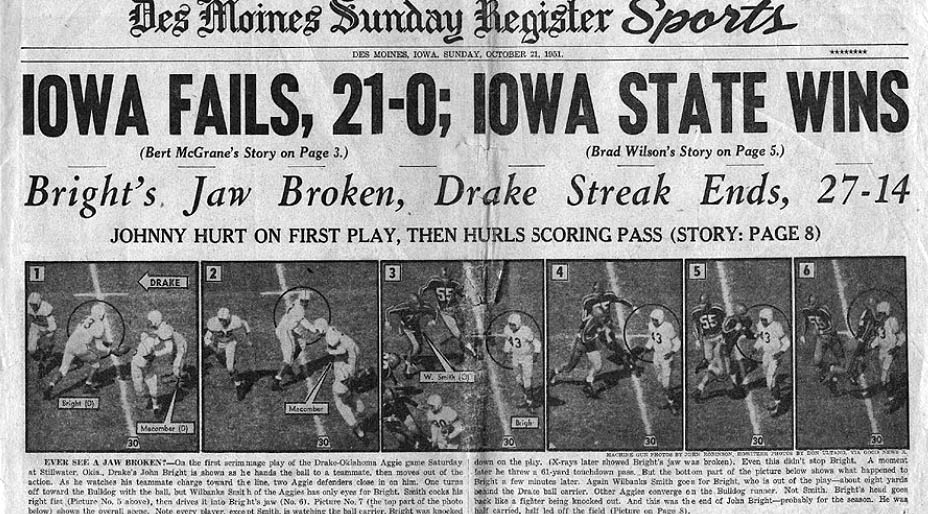
Johnny Bright Incident – October 21, 1951 Des Moines Register newspaper cover showing Robinson and Ultang photo sequence

Bright's participation as a halfback/quarterback in Drake's game against Oklahoma A&M on October 20, 1951, was controversial, as it marked the first time that such a prominent African-American athlete, with national fame (Bright was a pre-season Heisman Trophy candidate, and led the nation in total offense going into the game) and of critical importance to the success of his team (Drake was undefeated and carried a five-game winning streak into the contest, due in large part to his rushing and passing), played against Oklahoma A&M in a home game at Lewis Field, in Stillwater.

During the first seven minutes of the game, Bright had been knocked unconscious three times by blows from Oklahoma A&M defensive tackle Wilbanks Smith. While the final, elbow blow from Smith broke Bright's jaw, Bright was able to complete a 61-yard touchdown pass to halfback Jim Pilkington a few plays later, before the injury finally forced Bright to leave the game. Bright finished the game with 75 yards (14 yards rushing and 61 yards passing), the first time he had finished a game, with less than 100 yards in his three-year collegiate career at Drake. Oklahoma A&M eventually won the game 27–14.

A photographic sequence by Des Moines Register cameramen Don Ultang and John Robinson clearly showed that Smith's jaw-breaking blow to Bright had occurred well after Bright had handed off the ball to fullback Gene Macomber, and that the blow was delivered well behind the play. Years later, Ultang said that he and Robinson were lucky to capture the incident when they did; they'd only planned to stay through the first quarter so they could get the film developed in time for the next day's edition.

It had been an open secret before the game that A&M was planning to target Bright. Even though A&M had integrated two years earlier, the Jim Crow spirit was still very much alive in Stillwater. Both Oklahoma A&M's student newspaper, The Daily O'Collegian, and the local newspaper, The News Press, reported that Bright was a marked man, and several A&M students were openly claiming that Bright "would not be around at the end of the game." Ultang and Robinson had actually set up their camera after rumors of Bright being targeted became too loud to ignore.

When it became apparent that neither Oklahoma A&M nor the MVC would take any disciplinary action against Smith, Drake withdrew from the MVC in protest and stayed out until 1956 (though it didn't return for football until 1971). Fellow member Bradley University pulled out of the league as well in solidarity with Drake; while it returned for non-football sports in 1955, Bradley never played another down of football in the MVC (it dropped football in 1970).

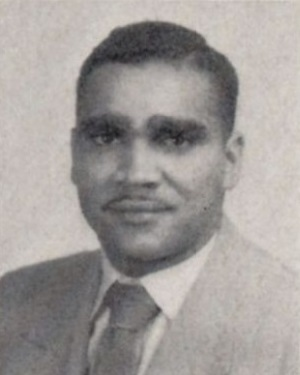
Bright's senior portrait in the 1952 Drake University yearbook

The "Johnny Bright Incident", as it became widely known, eventually provoked changes in NCAA football rules regarding illegal blocking, and mandated the use of more protective helmets with face guards.

Recalling the incident without apparent bitterness in a 1980 Des Moines Register interview three years before his death, Bright commented: "There's no way it couldn't have been racially motivated... . ..What I like about the whole deal now, and what I'm smug enough to say, is that getting a broken jaw has somehow made college athletics better. It made the NCAA take a hard look and clean up some things that were bad."

== Post-injury and end of college football career ==
Bright's jaw injury limited his effectiveness for the remainder of his senior season at Drake, but he finished his college career with 5,983 yards in total offense, averaging better than 236 yards per game in total offense, and scored 384 points in 25 games. As a senior, Bright earned 70 percent of the yards Drake gained and scored 70 percent of the Bulldogs' points, despite missing the better part of the final three games of the season.

Following his final football season at Drake (1951), Bright was named a first-team All-American and finished fifth in the balloting for the 1951 Heisman Trophy. Bright was also awarded the Nils V. "Swede" Nelson Sportsmanship Award, and played in both the post-season East–West Shrine Game and the Hula Bowl. He graduated from Drake with a Bachelor of Science in Education, with a specialization in physical education, in 1952.

In 1969, Bright was named Drake University's greatest football player of all time. He is also the only Drake football player to have his jersey number (No. 43) retired by the school. In June 2006, Bright received honorable mention from ESPN.com senior writer Ivan Maisel as one of the best college football players to ever wear No. 43.

== Professional football career ==
Bright was the first pick of the Philadelphia Eagles in the first round of the 1952 National Football League draft. Bright spurned the NFL, electing to emigrate to Canada and play for the Calgary Stampeders of the Western Interprovincial Football Union, the precursor to the West Division of the Canadian Football League. Bright later commented:

I would have been their (the Eagles') first Negro player. There was a tremendous influx of Southern players into the NFL at that time, and I didn't know what kind of treatment I could expect.

Bright joined the Calgary Stampeders as a fullback/linebacker in 1952, leading the Stampeders and the WIFU in rushing with 815 yards his rookie season. Bright played fullback/linebacker with the Stampeders for the 1952, 1953, and part of the 1954 seasons.

In 1954, the Calgary Stampeders traded him to the Edmonton Eskimos in mid-season. He enjoyed the most success of his professional football career as a member of the Eskimos. He moved to Edmonton and lived the rest of life in that city.

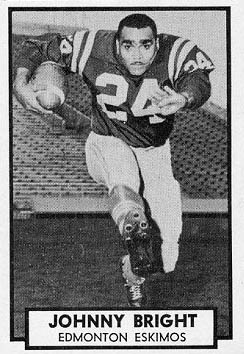
Bright football card issued by Topps

Though Bright played strictly defense as a linebacker in his first year with the Eskimos, he played both offense (as a fullback) and defense for two seasons (1955–1956), and played offense permanently after that (1957–1964). He, along with teammates Rollie Miles, Normie Kwong, and Jackie Parker, helped lead the Eskimos to successive Grey Cup titles in 1954, 1955, and 1956 (where Bright rushed for a then Grey Cup record of 169 yards in a 50–27 win over the Montreal Alouettes). In 1957, he rushed for eight consecutive 100-yard games, finishing the season with 1,679 yards. In 1958, he rushed for 1,722 yards. In 1959, following his third straight season as the Canadian pro rushing leader with 1,340 yards, Bright won the CFL's Most Outstanding Player Award, the first black athlete to be so honored. He was also named the Edmonton Athlete of the Year for 1959.

Bright was approached several times during his Canadian career by NFL teams about playing in the United States, but in the days before the large salaries of today's NFL players, it was common for CFL players such as him to have jobs in addition to football, and he had already started a teaching career in 1957, the year he moved his family to Edmonton.

I'd established a home and Canada had been good to me. I might have been interested, if the offers could have matched what I was making from both football and teaching.

Bright retired in 1964 as the CFL's all-time leading rusher (Mike Pringle and George Reed have since surpassed him). Bright rushed for 10,909 yards in 13 seasons, had five consecutive 1,000-yard seasons, and led the CFL in rushing four times. While Bright is (as of 2006) 15th on the all-pro rushing list, his career average of 5.5 yards per carry is the highest among more-than-10,000-yard rushers (Pro Football Hall of Famer Jim Brown is second at 5.2 yards per carry). At the time of his retirement, Bright had a then-CFL-record thirty-six 100-plus-yard games, carrying the ball 200 or more times for five straight seasons. Bright led the CFL Western Conference in rushing four times, winning the Eddie James Memorial Trophy in the process, and was a Western Conference All-Star five straight seasons from 1957 to 1961. Bright played in 197 consecutive CFL games as a fullback/linebacker. Bright's No. 24 jersey was added to the Edmonton Eskimos' Wall of Honour at Commonwealth Stadium in 1983. Bright was inducted into the Canadian Football Hall of Fame on November 26, 1970. In November 2006, Bright was voted one of the CFL's Top 50 players (No. 19) of the league's modern era by Canadian sports network TSN.

== Career regular season rushing statistics ==
Year	Team	Games	Rush	Yards	Average	Longest	Touchdowns
1952	Calgary Stampeders	13	144	815	5.7	75	2
1953	Calgary Stampeders	9	38	128	3.4	32	0
1954	Calgary Stampeders	1	8	30	3.8	14	0
1954	Edmonton Eskimos	11	37	184	5.0	12	0
1955	Edmonton Eskimos	12	107	643	6.0	34	2
1956	Edmonton Eskimos	9	93	573	6.2	22	4
1957	Edmonton Eskimos	16	259	1679	6.5	27	16
1958	Edmonton Eskimos	16	296	1722	5.8	90	8
1959	Edmonton Eskimos	16	231	1340	5.8	53	11
1960	Edmonton Eskimos	16	251	1268	5.1	28	14
1961	Edmonton Eskimos	16	236	1350	5.7	81	11
1962	Edmonton Eskimos	11	142	650	4.6	23	2
1963	Edmonton Eskimos	13	83	324	3.9	15	0
1964	Edmonton Eskimos	16	44	203	4.6	16	0
	Totals		1969	10,909	5.5	90	70

== Post-football career and death ==
Bright earned a Bachelor of Science degree in education at Drake University in 1952, becoming a teacher, coach, and school administrator, both during and after his professional football career, eventually rising to principal of D.S. Mackenzie Junior High School and Hillcrest Junior High School in Edmonton, Alberta. He was head coach at Edmonton's Bonnie Doon High School in the 1960s when the Lancers were a champion football team. He was also the head coach of the Edmonton Wildcats in the Canadian Junior Football League from 1978 to 1981.

He became a Canadian citizen in 1962.

Bright died of a massive heart attack on December 14, 1983, at the University of Alberta Hospital in Edmonton, while undergoing elective surgery to correct a knee injury suffered during his football career. He was survived by his wife and four children.

Bright is buried at Holy Cross Cemetery, in Edmonton.

== Legacy ==
Despite the evidence of the incident, Oklahoma A&M officials denied anything had happened. Indeed, Oklahoma A&M/State refused to make any further official comment on the incident for over half a century. This was the case even when Drake's former dean of men, Robert B. Kamm, became president of OSU in 1966; years later, he said that the determination to gloss over the affair was so strong that he knew he could not even discuss it. Finally, on September 28, 2005, Oklahoma State President David J. Schmidly wrote a letter to Drake President David Maxwell at Maxwell's request formally apologizing for the incident, calling it "an ugly mark on Oklahoma State University and college football." The apology came twenty-two years after Bright's death.

In February 2006, the football field at Drake Stadium, in Des Moines, Iowa, was named in Bright's honour.

In September 2010, Johnny Bright School opened in the Rutherford neighbourhood of Edmonton. The primary school (later included Middle School) was officially opened on September 15 by representatives of the school district and Alberta Education Minister Dave Hancock, and included tributes from Bright's family, several dignitaries, and former colleagues of Bright from both his athletic and educational careers.

On September 1, 2020, Drake University announced the opening of a two-year college at the university named the John Dee Bright College.

In October 2026, Drake University unveiled a statue outside of Drake Stadium in honour of Bright.

== See also ==
- List of NCAA major college football yearly total offense leaders
