= Rollie Miles =

Canadian football player

No. 18, 98
- Positions: Running back, Defensive back, Linebacker

Personal information
- Born: February 16, 1927; Washington, D.C., U.S.
- Died: August 17, 1995 (aged 68); Edmonton, Alberta, Canada
- Listed height: 5 ft 10 in (1.78 m)
- Listed weight: 175 lb (79 kg)

Career information
- College: St. Augustine's College

Career history
- 1951–1961: Edmonton Eskimos

Awards and highlights
- 3× Grey Cup champion (1954, 1955, 1956); 6× CFL West All-Star (1953–1956, 1958–1959); Edmonton Eskimos Wall of Honour (1983)
- Canadian Football Hall of Fame (Class of 1980)

Elmer Roland "Rollie" Miles (February 16, 1927 – August 17, 1995) was a professional football player for the Canadian Football League (CFL)'s Edmonton Eskimos. Miles played offence (running back), defence (linebacker, defensive back), and special teams (kickoff/punt returner, punter), during his eleven-year career with the Eskimos. Miles is a member of the Canadian Football Hall of Fame, the Alberta Sports Hall of Fame, and the Edmonton Eskimos Wall of Honour. In November 2006, Miles was voted one of the CFL's Top 50 players (#48) of the league's modern era by Canadian sports network TSN.

== Early life and college career ==
Miles was born in Washington, D.C., and attended college at St. Augustine's College in Raleigh, North Carolina. At St. Augustine's, Miles excelled in baseball, football, and track and field.

Miles initially left the United States for Canada to play baseball in Regina, Saskatchewan, but was convinced by the famed Annis Stukus to play football for the Edmonton Eskimos. He would continue to play semi-professional baseball in Canada during his CFL career.

== Professional football career ==
Miles was one of the most versatile players in the history of the CFL during his eleven-year (1951–1961) career with the Edmonton Eskimos. As a defensive player (linebacker and defensive back), Miles intercepted 38 passes for 547 yards. As a special teams player, Miles returned punts (finishing with 279 punt returns for 2,085 yards) and kickoffs (88 returns for 2,131 yards), and punted on occasion. On offence, Miles was often found in a backfield with such CFL greats as Jackie Parker, Normie Kwong, Johnny Bright, Bernie Faloney and Don Getty; he could run or pass on the option with skill.

Selected as a CFL Western Conference All-Star eight times (three at running back, three at defensive back, two at linebacker) Miles was also named the Eskimos' team Most Valuable Player three times.

Miles played in five CFL Grey Cup championship games, winning three during the Eskimos' dynasty of successive Grey Cup titles in 1954, 1955, and 1956. Miles played in the famous 1954 Grey Cup game with separated ribs, but still helped his underdog team win that classic game.

Miles was inducted into the Canadian Football Hall of Fame and the Alberta Sports Hall of Fame in 1980. The Eskimos added Miles' No. 18 jersey to its Wall of Honour in 1983. The City of Edmonton named the Rollie Miles Athletic Field in his honor.

== Career regular season statistics ==
CFL statistics			Rushing					Receiving					Passing					
Year	Team	GP	#	Yds	Ave.	Lg	TD	Rec	Yds	Y/R	Lg	TD	Att	Com	%	Yds	TD	Int
1951	Edmonton	14	52	416	8.0		3	3	41	13.7		1	9	3	33.3	162	1	0
1952	Edmonton	16	46	220	4.8	40	0	22	342	15.5		1	14	6	42.9	183	2	0
1953	Edmonton	15	134	819	6.1	91	8	37	657	17.8		3	27	12	44.4	287	2	1
1954	Edmonton	14	148	834	5.6	27	4	16	283	17.7	44	2	64	31	48.4	410	3	4
1955	Edmonton	11	50	224	4.5	15	0	16	235	14.7	47	3	6	1	16.7	38	0	0
1956	Edmonton	6	38	226	5.9	30	2	29	410	14.1	37	3	6	2	33.3	30	1	1
1957	Edmonton	14	28	183	6.5	18	1	14	250	17.9	40	1	4	1	25.0	8	0	1
1958	Edmonton	16	6	14	2.3	8	0	7	149	21.3	41	0	3	3	100.0	47	0	0
1959	Edmonton	15	10	75	7.5	18	1	4	58	14.5	19	0	-	-	-	-	-	-
1960	Edmonton	14	3	21	7.0	9	0	1	23	23.0	23	1	5	1	20.0	9	0	2
1961	Edmonton	11	-	-	-	-	-	1	8	8.0	8	0	-	-	-	-	-	-
	Totals		515	3032	5.9	91	19	150	2456	16.4	47	15	138	60	43.5	1174	9	9

CFL statistics			Kick Off Returns					Interceptions					Punt returns					Punting			
Year	Team	GP	#	Yds	Ave.	Lg	TD	Int	Yds	Y/Int	Lg	TD	#	Yds	Ave.	Lg	TD	No	Yds	Ave.	Lg
1951	Edmonton	14	7	103	14.7	0	0	-	-	-	-	-	33	269	8.2		0	24	925	38.5	
1952	Edmonton	16	16	474	29.6	101	1	4	80	20.0	29	0	41	384	9.4	32	0	-	-	-	-
1953	Edmonton	15	6	123	20.5	32	0	6	56	9.3	29	0	54	464	8.6	32	0	-	-	-	-
1954	Edmonton	14	17	406	23.9	52	0	4	71	17.8	40	0	18	124	6.9	25	0	4	104	26.0	40
1955	Edmonton	11	5	117	23.4	63	0	3	60	20.0	33	0	1	13	13.0	13	0	-	-	-	-
1956	Edmonton	6	15	403	26.9	52	0	4	145	36.2	69	1	1	15	15.0	15	0	-	-	-	-
1957	Edmonton	14	3	29	9.7	19	0	-	-	-	-	-	-	-	-	-	-	1	42	42.0	42
1958	Edmonton	16	4	71	17.8	29	0	10	57	5.7	20	0	5	34	6.8	13	0	-	-	-	-
1959	Edmonton	15	12	330	27.5	67	0	3	15	5.0	8	0	75	487	6.5	33	0	1	48	48.0	48
1960	Edmonton	14	-	-	-	-	-	2	24	12.0	14	0	33	208	6.3	22	0	-	-	-	-
1961	Edmonton	11	3	75	25.0	32	0	2	39	19.5	26	0	18	87	4.8	16	0	-	-	-	-
	Totals		88	2131	24.2	101	1	38	547	14.4	69	1	279	2085	7.5	33	0	30	1119	37.3	48

== Later life and death ==
Miles received his Bachelor of Arts degree from the University of Alberta in 1956, and began work in the off season with the Edmonton Catholic School Board, where he taught school and organized high school sports. Miles continued working with the Edmonton Catholic School Board upon his retirement from the CFL in 1961.

Miles and his wife, Dr. Marianne Miles, had seven children: Craig "Tony" Miles, Rolanda Miles, Michelle Miles, Monica Lipscombe, Rollie Miles, Jr. (lineman on the University of Alberta Golden Bears 1980 Vanier Cup national championship football team, and Most Valuable Player of the 1980 Churchill Bowl), Brett Miles (noted singer, songwriter and saxophonist), and Mario Miles (co-founder of the Millwood Grizzlies Minor Football Association in Edmonton in 1996, and coach from 1996 to present).

Miles was the grandfather of actor Jesse Lipscombe.

Miles died in 1995 in Edmonton.
