= Earl Lindley =

American gridiron football player (1933–2012)

Profile
- Positions: Fullback, Linebacker

Personal information
- Born: March 13, 1933; Wellsville, Utah, U.S.
- Died: February 14, 2012 (aged 78); Logan, Utah, U.S.
- Listed height: 6 ft 2 in (1.88 m)
- Listed weight: 220 lb (100 kg)

Career information
- College: Utah State
- NFL draft: 1954: 16th round, 186th overall pick

Career history
- 1954–1957: Edmonton Eskimos

Awards and highlights
- 3× Grey Cup champion (1954, 1955, 1956); Utah Sports Hall of Fame (1986)

Earl Leishman Lindley (March 13, 1933 – February 14, 2012) was an American professional football player from 1954 to 1957. He participated in three Grey Cup victories in 1954, 1955 and 1956. He played his college football at Utah State University, where he led all scorers in NCAA football in 1953, with 13 touchdowns and 3 extra points for a total of 81 points.

He was inducted into the Utah Sports Hall of Fame in 1986. Lindley was a member of the Church of Jesus Christ Latter Day Saints.

== See also ==
- List of NCAA major college football yearly scoring leaders
