= Bill Briggs (Canadian football) =

Canadian gridiron football player (1925–2000)

Profile
- Position: Halfback

Personal information
- Born: April 6, 1925; Toronto, Ontario, Canada
- Died: April 19, 2000 (aged 75); Penticton, British Columbia, Canada
- Listed height: 6 ft 4 in (1.93 m)
- Listed weight: 210 lb (95 kg)

Career information
- College: Iowa

Career history
- 1945–1949: Toronto Argonauts
- 1950–1957: Edmonton Eskimos

Awards and highlights
- 4× Grey Cup champion (1947, 1954, 1955, 1956)

William Thomas Briggs (April 6, 1925 – April 19, 2000) was a Canadian professional football player who played for the Edmonton Eskimos and Toronto Argonauts. He won the Grey Cup with the Argos in 1947 (35th) before moving to Edmonton, where he had three more Grey Cup wins in 1954 (42nd), 1955 (43rd), and 1956 (44th).

Briggs was born in Toronto, Ontario, Canada and is often confused with another football player, William John Brigg, who played for the University of Iowa.

After retiring from football, Bill pursued several careers, among them a salesman for McLaren Electronics, a master electrician and a minister with the United Church. He held the position of assistant minister at St. Andrews Wesley Church in Vancouver, British Columbia for several years. He died at a hospice in Penticton, British Columbia in 2000.

Briggs was inducted into the Alberta Sports Hall of Fame and Museum in 2007, as a member of the 1954-56 Edmonton Eskimos teams.
