= Don Simon =

Canadian football player

Profile
- Position: Halfback

Personal information
- Born: September 22, 1930; Edmonton, Alberta, Canada
- Died: May 30, 2013 (aged 82); Calgary, Alberta, Canada
- Listed height: 5 ft 11 in (1.80 m)
- Listed weight: 188 lb (85 kg)

Career history
- 1949–1957: Edmonton Eskimos

Awards and highlights
- 3× Grey Cup champion (1954, 1955, 1956)

Donald Louis Simon (September 22, 1930 – May 30, 2013) was a Canadian professional football player who played for the Edmonton Eskimos. He won the Grey Cup with them in 1954, 1955, and 1956.
