= TSN Top 50 CFL Players =

2006 Canadian Football League player ranking

The TSN Top 50 CFL Players was a list of the greatest fifty Canadian Football League players, as selected by a panel of sixty former CFL players, then-current and former coaches, executives, and media members in 2006. The panel was assembled by sports television network TSN in partnership with the CFL. The results were announced as part of the 2006 Grey Cup festivities in Winnipeg, Manitoba.

== The Top 50 ==
The panel voted on a list of 185 players, including 119 named to the Canadian Football Hall of Fame on the basis of performance since 1945, and 66 others identified during a three-month research process. Brothers Doug Flutie and Darren Flutie bookended the top 50, while Damon Allen (professional gridiron football's all-time leading passer at the time; his record was surpassed on October 10, 2011, by Anthony Calvillo, who did not make the list), Milt Stegall (the CFL's all-time leader in touchdown receptions), Terry Vaughn (the CFL's all-time leader in receptions at the time; his record was beaten by Ben Cahoon in October 2010), and Joe Montford (perennial all-star defensive end), were still active when named to the list.

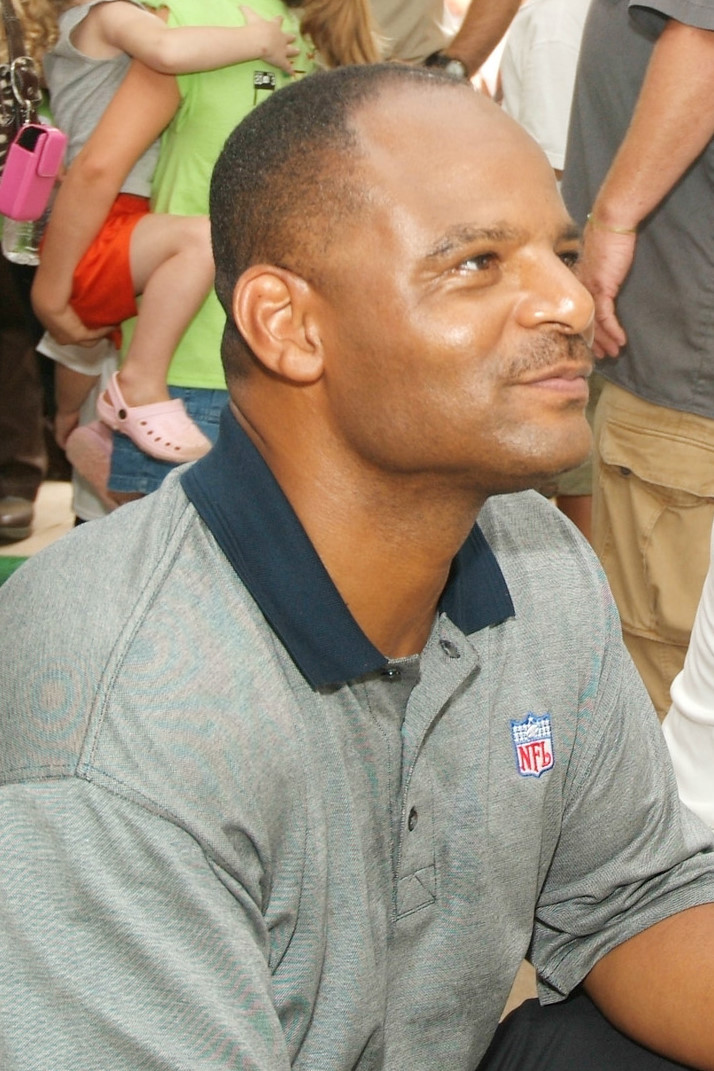
Warren Moon

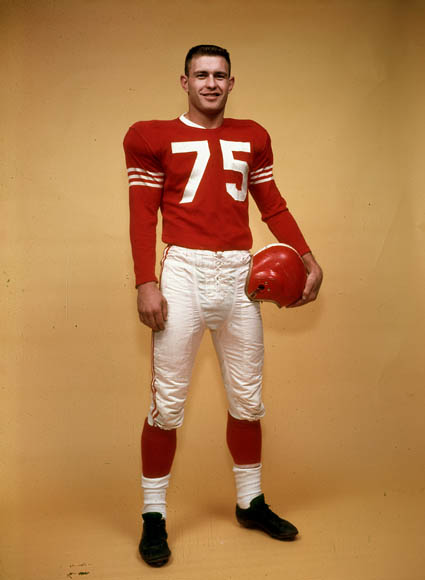
Hal Patterson

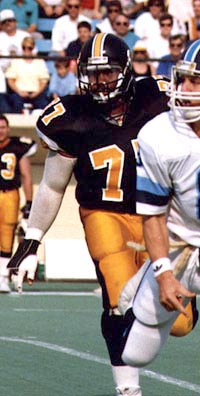
Grover Covington

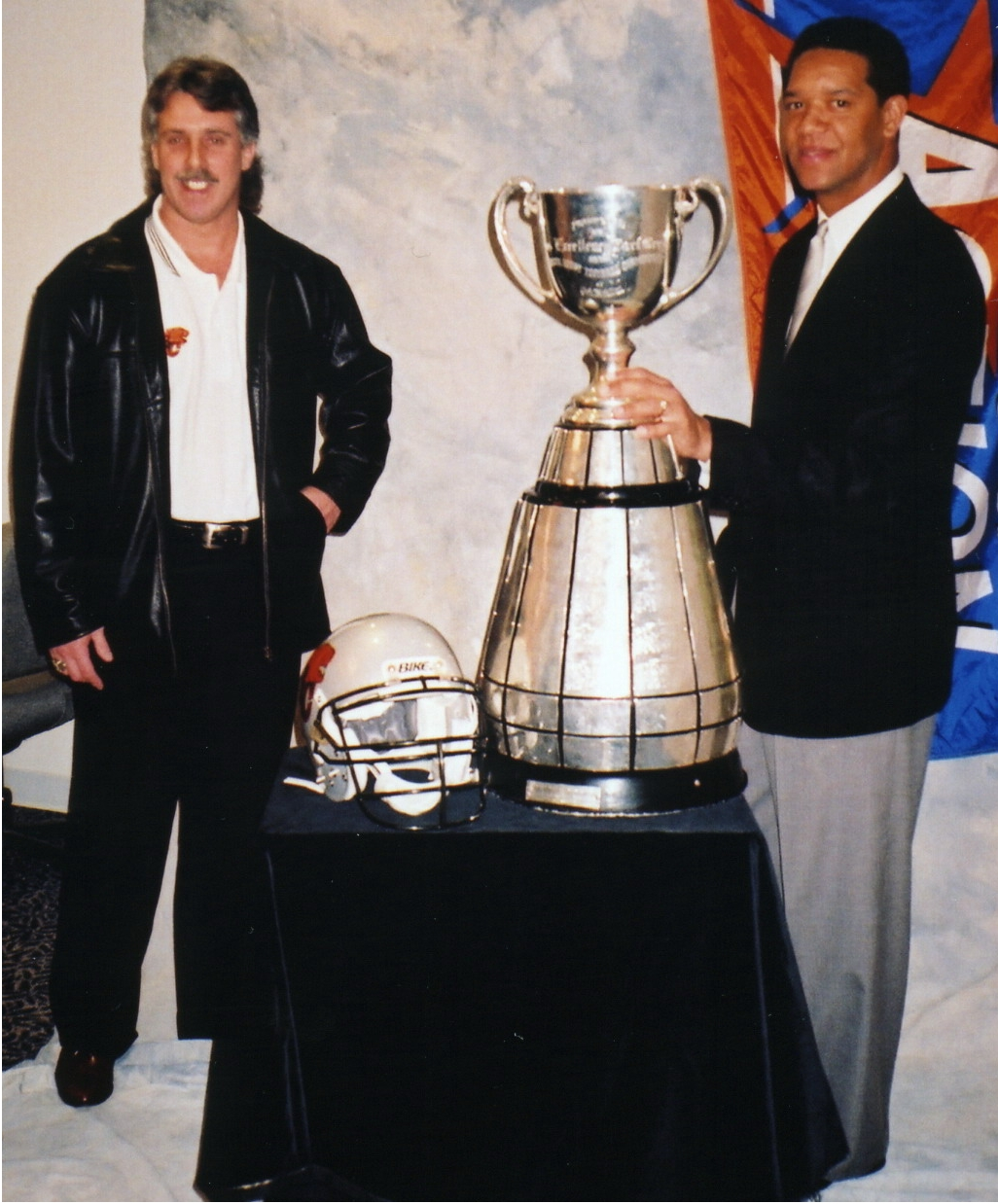
Lui Passaglia and Damon Allen with the Grey Cup

Note: Canadian players

Rank	Name	Position(s)	Years in CFL (Note: First year played in CFL to last year played in CFL. Any intervening years in which a player did not play in the CFL are not listed.)	GP (Note: Number of CFL games played)	Team(s)
1.	Doug Flutie	QB	1990–1997	136	BC, Calgary, Toronto
2.	George Reed	RB	1963–1975	203	Saskatchewan
3.	Jackie Parker	QB, RB, DB, K	1954–1968	173	Edmonton, Toronto, BC
4.	Mike Pringle	RB	1992–2004	188	Sacramento, Baltimore, Montreal, Edmonton
5.	Warren Moon	QB	1978–1983	94	Edmonton
6.	Garney Henley	DB, WR	1960–1975	216	Hamilton
7.	Ron Lancaster	QB	1960–1978	288	Ottawa, Saskatchewan
8.	Russ Jackson	QB	1958–1969	167	Ottawa
9.	Wayne Harris	LB	1961–1972	180	Calgary
10.	Allen Pitts	SB	1990–2000	176	Calgary
11.	Dan Kepley	LB	1975–1984	138	Edmonton
12.	John Helton	DL	1969–1982	219	Calgary, Winnipeg
13.	Hal Patterson	WR	1954–1967	80 (Note: Incomplete information)	Montreal, Hamilton
14.	Damon Allen	QB	1985–2007	350 (Note: As of the end of the 2006 CFL season)	Edmonton, Ottawa, Hamilton, Memphis, BC, Toronto
15.	Milt Stegall	SB	1995–2008	163	Winnipeg
16.	Willie Pless	LB	1986–1999	229	Toronto, BC, Edmonton, Saskatchewan
17.	John Barrow	OL, DL	1957–1970	192	Hamilton
18.	Tony Gabriel	WR	1971–1981	168	Hamilton, Ottawa
19.	Johnny Bright	FB, LB	1952–1964	157	Calgary, Edmonton
20.	Brian Kelly	WR	1979–1987	137	Edmonton
21.	James Parker	DE, LB	1980–1991	161	Edmonton, BC, Toronto
22.	Chris Walby	OL	1981–1996	254	Montreal, Winnipeg
23.	Less Browne	DB	1984–1994	174	Hamilton, Winnipeg, Ottawa, BC
24.	Dave Fennell	DL	1974–1983	154	Edmonton
25.	Gizmo Williams	KR, WR	1986–2000	200	Edmonton
26.	Sam Etcheverry	QB	1952–1960	122	Montreal
27.	Tommy Joe Coffey	WR, K	1959–1973	197	Hamilton, Edmonton, Toronto
28.	Grover Covington	DE	1981–1991	168	Hamilton
29.	Leo Lewis	RB	1955–1966	161	Winnipeg
30.	Lui Passaglia	K, P, WR	1976–2000	408	BC
31.	Pinball Clemons	RB, KR	1989–2000	185	Toronto
32.	Roger Aldag	OL	1976–1992	271	Saskatchewan
33.	Dickie Harris	DB	1972–1982	134	Montreal
34.	Norman Kwong	FB	1948–1960	157	Calgary, Edmonton
35.	Marv Luster	DB	1961–1974	183	Montreal, Toronto
36.	Ray Elgaard	SB	1983–1996	220	Saskatchewan
37.	Angelo Mosca	DL	1958–1972	160	Hamilton, Ottawa, Montreal
38.	Larry Highbaugh	DB	1971–1983	195	BC, Edmonton
39.	Matt Dunigan	QB	1983–1996	194	Edmonton, BC, Toronto, Winnipeg, Birmingham, Hamilton
40.	Joe Montford	DE	1995–2006	185	Shreveport, Hamilton, Toronto, Edmonton
41.	Kaye Vaughan	OL	1953–1964	166	Ottawa
42.	Mervyn Fernandez	WR	1982–1994	83	BC
43.	Bill Baker	DE	1968–1978	174	Saskatchewan, BC
44.	Dan Bass	LB	1980–1991	197	Toronto, Calgary, Edmonton
45.	Terry Vaughn	SB	1995–2006	203	Calgary, Edmonton, Montreal, Hamilton
46.	Joe Krol	QB	1945–1955	92	Toronto
47.	Tom Clements	QB	1975–1987	182	Ottawa, Saskatchewan, Hamilton, Winnipeg
48.	Rollie Miles	RB, LB, DB, KR, P	1951–1961	122	Edmonton
49.	Bill Frank	OL	1962–1976	184	BC, Toronto, Winnipeg
50.	Darren Flutie	WR	1991–2002	193	BC, Edmonton, Hamilton

== The Honour Roll ==
The remaining players were named to an honour roll.

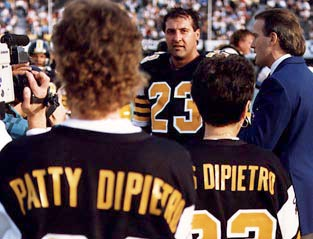
Rocky DiPietro

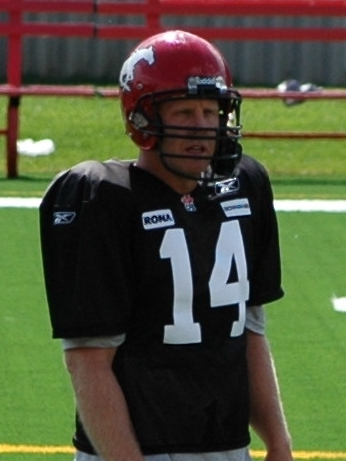
Danny McManus

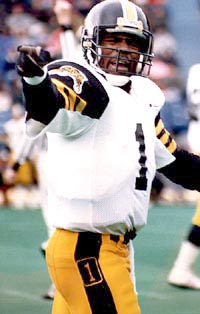
Earl Winfield

- Jack Abendschan, OL
- Junior Ah You, DL
- Kelvin Anderson, RB
- Ron Atchison, DL
- By Bailey, RB
- Greg Battle, LB
- Jerald Baylis, DL
- Al Benecick, OL
- Paul Bennett, DB
- Dieter Brock, QB
- Tom Brown, LB
- Willie Burden, RB
- Ben Cahoon, WR
- Anthony Calvillo, QB
- Bob Cameron, P
- Hugh Campbell, WR
- Jerry Campbell, LB
- Eric Carter, DB
- Tom Casey, RB
- Ken Charlton, RB
- Bryan Chiu, OL
- Ken Clark, P
- Bill Clarke, DL
- Lovell Coleman, RB
- Marvin Coleman, DB
- Rod Connop, OL
- Royal Copeland, RB
- Jim Corrigall, DL
- Larry Crawford, DB
- Dave Cutler, K
- Peter Dalla Riva, WR
- Dave Dickenson, QB
- Rocky DiPietro, WR
- George Dixon, RB
- Ron Estay, DL
- Terry Evanshen, WR
- Lloyd Fairbanks, OL
- Bernie Faloney, QB
- Dan Ferrone, OL
- Norm Fieldgate, LB
- Joe Fleming, DL
- Willie Fleming, RB
- Dick Fouts, DL
- Cam Fraser, P
- Gene Gaines, DB
- Jeff Garcia, QB
- Ed George, OL
- Cookie Gilchrist, RB
- Tony Golab, RB
- Tommy Grant, WR
- Herb Gray, DL
- Terry Greer, WR
- Tracy Ham, QB
- Herm Harrison, WR
- Tom Hinton, OL
- Condredge Holloway, QB
- Dick Huffman, DL
- Tommy Hugo, OL
- Hank Ilesic, P
- Glen Jackson, LB
- Jack Jacobs, QB
- Gerry James, RB
- Alondra Johnson, LB
- Will Johnson, DL
- Tyrone Jones, LB
- Bobby Jurasin, DL
- Joe Kapp, QB
- Jerry Keeling, DB
- Ellison Kelly, OL
- John LaGrone, DL
- Ken Lehmann, LB
- Billy Ray Locklin, DL
- Earl Lunsford, RB
- Don Luzzi, DL
- Dave Mann, P
- George McGowan, WR
- Mark McLoughlin, K
- Danny McManus, QB
- Ed McQuarters, DL
- Derrell Mitchell, WR
- Frank Morris, OL
- James Murphy, WR
- Don Narcisse, WR
- Roger Nelson, OL
- Ray Nettles, LB
- Pete Neumann, DL
- Ray Odums, DB
- Uzooma Okeke, OL
- Red O'Quinn, WR
- Paul Osbaldiston, K
- Mike O'Shea, LB
- Tony Pajaczkowski, OL
- Elfrid Payton, DL
- Ken Ploen, QB
- Joe Poplawski, WR
- Noel Prefontaine, P
- Dave Raimey, RB
- Willard Reaves, RB
- Dave Ridgway, K
- Frank Rigney, OL
- Charles Roberts, RB
- Larry Robinson, DB
- Jim Rountree, DB
- Paul Rowe, RB
- Martin Ruby, OL
- Tom Scott, WR
- Vince Scott, DL
- Dick Shatto, RB
- David Shaw, DB
- Wayne Shaw, LB
- Bob Simpson, WR
- Ron Stewart, RB
- Jim Stillwagon, DL
- Don Sutherin, DB
- Bill Symons, RB
- Dave Thelen, RB
- Dick Thornton, DB
- Buddy Tinsley, OL
- Herb Trawick, DL
- Whit Tucker, WR
- Ted Urness, OL
- Pierre Vercheval, OL
- Virgil Wagner, RB
- James West, LB
- Mike Widger, LB
- Tom Wilkinson, QB
- Al Wilson, OL
- Earl Winfield, WR
- Harvey Wylie, DB
- Dan Yochum, OL
- Jim Young, WR
- Ben Zambiasi, LB
- Bill Zock, OL
- Joe Zuger, P
