= Ted Tully =

Canadian football player (1930–2003)

Ted (Robert) Tully
No. 84
- Position: Linebacker

Personal information
- Born: August 8, 1930; Vancouver, British Columbia, Canada
- Died: January 24, 2003 (aged 72); Edmonton, Alberta, Canada
- Listed height: 6 ft 0 in (1.83 m)
- Listed weight: 205 lb (93 kg)

Career information
- CJFL: Vancouver Meralomas

Career history
- 1950–1958: Edmonton Eskimos
- 1959: British Columbia Lions
- 1960–1962: Edmonton Eskimos

Awards and highlights
- 3× Grey Cup champion (1954, 1955, 1956); 4× CFL West All-Star (1955, 1956, 1957, 1958)

Ted Tully (August 8, 1930 – January 24, 2003) was a linebacker for the Edmonton Eskimos and the BC Lions from 1950 to 1962 of the Canadian Football League (CFL). He was a West Division All-Star in 1955, 1956, 1957 and 1958, and was part of three Grey Cup championships with the Eskimos. He married a nurse named Elaine Virginia Foss, and had 4 children; one son and three daughters.
