= Chuck Hunsinger =

American football player (1925–1998)

- Hunsinger at UF

No. 46, 84
- Position: Halfback

Personal information
- Born: July 25, 1925; Harrisburg, Illinois, U.S.
- Died: March 23, 1998 (aged 72); Harrisburg, Illinois, U.S.
- Listed height: 6 ft 0 in (1.83 m)
- Listed weight: 188 lb (85 kg)

Career information
- High school: Harrisburg
- College: Florida
- NFL draft: 1950: 1st round, 3rd overall pick

Career history
- Chicago Bears (1950–1952); Montreal Alouettes (1953–1955)

Awards and highlights
- 2× First-team All-SEC (1948, 1949); Florida–Georgia Hall of Fame; University of Florida Athletic Hall of Fame

Career NFL statistics
- Rushing yards: 834
- Rushing average: 4.3
- Receptions: 23
- Receiving yards: 249
- Total touchdowns: 8
- Stats at Pro Football Reference

Charles Ray Hunsinger (July 25, 1925 – March 23, 1998) was an American college and professional football player who was a running back in the National Football League (NFL) and the Interprovincial Rugby Football Union (IRFU) for six seasons during the 1950s. Hunsinger played college football for the University of Florida, and thereafter, he played professionally for the Chicago Bears of the NFL and the Montreal Alouettes of the IRFU.

== Early life ==
Hunsinger was born in Harrisburg, Illinois in 1925. He attended Harrisburg High School, and played for the Harrisburg Bulldogs high school football team.

== College career ==
Hunsinger attended the University of Florida in Gainesville, Florida, where he was a running back for coach Bear Wolf's Florida Gators football team from 1946 to 1949. He rushed for 2,017 yards in his college career, with 842 yards in 1948 and 774 yards in 1949. Hunsinger was popular with the Florida student body, and the "Humdinger Song" (including the lyric "Hunsinger is a humdinger") was written by a pair of Alabama sports writers and sung by students. Memorably, in 1948, he had a 96-yard kickoff return for a touchdown against the Alabama Crimson Tide, and his 842 total yards for 1948 would remain the Gators' single season rushing record until it was broken by Nat Moore in 1972. Hunsinger had two outstanding games in 1949, rushing for 199 yards versus the Furman Hurricanes and 174 yards and three touchdowns against the Georgia Bulldogs. He was a first-team All-Southeastern Conference (SEC) selection in 1948 and 1949.

Hunsinger graduated from the Florida with a bachelor's degree in 1950, and was later inducted into the University of Florida Athletic Hall of Fame as a "Gator Great."

== Professional career ==
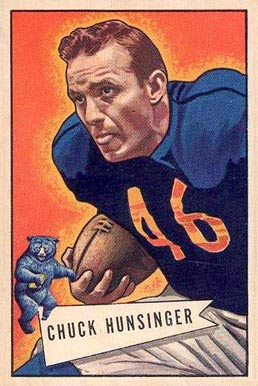
Hunsinger on a 1952 Bowman card

=== Chicago Bears ===
The Chicago Bears selected Hunsinger in the first round (third pick overall) of the 1950 NFL draft, and he had a three-year career with the Bears, from 1950 to 1952. He played thirty-four games in all, rushing for 834 yards (his best year was 1951 with 369) and catching twenty-three passes. Hunsinger also returned punts and kickoffs, and was the fourth-ranked kick returner in the league in 1950, averaging 28.6 yards per return.

=== Montreal Alouettes ===
Hunsinger also played three years (twenty-seven games from 1953 to 1955) with the Montreal Alouettes of the CFL. He compiled his best CFL season statistically in 1954, when he rushed eighty-six times for 516 yards and six touchdowns, and caught twenty-two passes for 421 yards and two more touchdowns. He is most remembered, however, for one play in 1954's 42nd Grey Cup. His Alouettes were leading by five points in the final minutes of the game, and were threatening to add to the lead with the ball on the Edmonton Eskimos' ten yard-line. In a 1968 interview with The Toronto Star, Hunsinger recalled,

I was right back and the play was a sweep to the left. Their right tackle broke through and I saw I wasn't going anywhere, so I decided to pass. . . . Just as I was about to throw, someone hit me from behind—not hard, mind you—but enough to shake the ball loose. Somebody was lying across my legs and I was sick when I looked up to see Jackie Parker taking off down the field.

Canadian Football Hall of Fame great Parker returned the ball a record ninety yards to score the game-winning touchdown. It was one of the greatest plays in Grey Cup history.

Hunsinger recounted picking up his wife at Toronto's Royal York Hotel after the game, and heading straight home to Harrisburg with a sick feeling in his stomach. He also recalled the elation of arriving at his home to find an 800-foot-long "Cheer up, Chuck" telegram with the signatures of 21,947 Montreal Alouettes fans.

== See also ==
- Florida Gators football, 1940–49
- List of Chicago Bears first-round draft picks
- List of Chicago Bears players
- List of Florida Gators in the NFL draft
- List of University of Florida alumni
- List of University of Florida Athletic Hall of Fame members
