= Bernie Faloney =

American gridiron football player (1932–1999)

- Faloney featured in the October 1966 issue of Canadian Boy

No. 10, 90, 92
- Position: Quarterback

Personal information
- Born: June 15, 1932; Carnegie, Pennsylvania, U.S.
- Died: June 14, 1999 (aged 66); Hamilton, Ontario, Canada
- Listed height: 6 ft 0 in (1.83 m)
- Listed weight: 193 lb (88 kg)

Career information
- College: Maryland
- NFL draft: 1954: 1st round, 11th overall pick

Career history
- 1954: Edmonton Eskimos
- 1957–1964: Hamilton Tiger-Cats
- 1965–1966: Montreal Alouettes
- 1967: BC Lions

Awards and highlights
- 3× Grey Cup champion (1954, 1957, 1963); CFL Most Outstanding Player (1961); Jeff Russel Memorial Trophy (1965); 5× CFL East All-Star (1958, 1959, 1961, 1964, 1965); Hamilton Tiger-Cats No. 10 retired; National champion (1953); First-team All-American (1953); ACC Player of the Year (1953); First-team All-ACC (1953)

Career CFL statistics
- Passing completions: 1,493
- Passing attempts: 2,876
- Completion percentage: 51.9
- TD–INT: 151–201
- Passing yards: 24,264
- Canadian Football Hall of Fame (Class of 1974)

Bernie Faloney (June 15, 1932 – June 14, 1999) was a professional football player in the Canadian Football League (primarily with the Hamilton Tiger-Cats) and an outstanding American college football player for the Maryland Terrapins. Born in Carnegie, Pennsylvania, Faloney is a member of the Canadian Football Hall of Fame, Canada's Sports Hall of Fame, the Pennsylvania Sports Hall of Fame, the Western Pennsylvania Hall of Fame, and the University of Maryland Athletic Hall of Fame. Faloney's jersey No. 10 was retired by the Hamilton Tiger-Cats in 1999. In 2005, Faloney was inducted into the Ontario Sports Hall of Fame. In 2006, Faloney was voted to the Honour Roll of the CFL's Top 50 Players of the league's modern era by Canadian sports network TSN.

== Early life and college career ==
B.J. "Bernie" Faloney was born in Carnegie, Pennsylvania, where he played high school football before attending the University of Maryland, College Park. There, he played college football as a quarterback, helping the Terrapins make it to the Sugar Bowl in 1952. In his senior season of 1953, Faloney quarterbacked Maryland to be NCAA Division I-A national football champions and into the 1954 Orange Bowl. At season's end, Faloney finished fourth in the balloting for the 1953 Heisman Trophy.

== Professional football career ==
Faloney was selected 11th overall in the first round of the 1954 NFL draft by the San Francisco 49ers. San Francisco offered Faloney $9,000 to play defensive back and back-up quarterback. However Pop Ivy, coach of the University of Maryland's Orange Bowl opponent, Oklahoma, was moving to the Edmonton Eskimos of the Western Interprovincial Football Union and offered Faloney a $12,500 contract to accompany him. At the time the Canadian dollar was worth 10 percent more than its American counterpart, so the choice to head north was easy, Faloney later recalled.

A scrambling quarterback, Faloney helped the Eskimos win the 1954 Grey Cup but then fulfilled his mandatory service in the United States armed forces, serving with the U.S. Air Force from 1955 to 1956. A free agent after his military service, Faloney signed with the Hamilton Tiger-Cats in 1957 and became one of the major stars of the Canadian Football League, winning two Grey Cup championships with the Ti-Cats. Traded from Hamilton in 1965, he played for the Montreal Alouettes and the BC Lions before retiring in 1967.

Faloney was the Eastern Conference's All-Star quarterback on five occasions, 1958, 1959, 1961, 1964 and 1965. In 1961, he won the CFL's Most Outstanding Player Award. His career CFL stats include 1,493 pass completions of 2,876 attempts for 153 touchdowns and 24,264 yards. He is the first CFL quarterback to win a Grey Cup championship with both Eastern and Western Conference teams.

Bernie Faloney was inducted into the Canadian Football Hall of Fame in 1974, the Western Pennsylvania Hall of Fame in 1983, the Pennsylvania Sports Hall of Fame in 1985, the University of Maryland Athletic Hall of Fame in 1988, and Canada's Sports Hall of Fame in 1999. In November 2006, Faloney was voted to the Honour Roll of the CFL's top 50 players of the league's modern era by Canadian sports network TSN.

== Later life and death ==
In retirement, Faloney made his home in Hamilton, Ontario, where he became a part owner of a construction company. An avid horseman, he remained active in community and business affairs until being stricken with colorectal cancer.

Faloney was the first Tiger-Cat player to have his number retired by the club when the team announced his number retirement on June 8, 1999. He died six days later on June 14, 1999, in Hamilton, Ontario.

== Tribute ==
Cannon Street in Hamilton, Ontario, in the Brian Timmis Stadium and Tim Hortons Field area is also known as Bernie Faloney Way.

== Video clips ==
Canadian Football Hall of Fame member

== External sources ==
- Graham Kelly, The Grey Cup (1999)
