= Ray MacLeod =

Canadian gridiron football player (1933–2016)

Ray McLeod
Profile
- Position: Guard

Personal information
- Born: June 24, 1933; Vancouver, British Columbia, Canada
- Died: June 20, 2016 (aged 82)
- Listed height: 6 ft 0 in (1.83 m)
- Listed weight: 210 lb (95 kg)

Career information
- College: Oregon

Career history
- 1953–1954: Edmonton Eskimos
- 1955: Winnipeg Blue Bombers

Awards and highlights
- Grey Cup champion (1954)

Raymond MacLeod (June 24, 1933 – June 20, 2016) was a Canadian professional football player who played for the Edmonton Eskimos and Winnipeg Blue Bombers. He won the Grey Cup with the Eskimos in 1954. Born in Vancouver, he is an alumnus of the University of Oregon.
