= 1954 in Canadian football =

The Edmonton Eskimos upset the Montreal Alouettes to send the Grey Cup trophy back west for the first time since 1948.

== Canadian Football News in 1954 ==
1954 is generally recognized as the start of the modern era of Canadian football.

The BC Lions joined the WIFU and adopted the colours of burnt orange and brown. The NBC national network were televising IRFU games.

Winnipeg's Gerry James (RB), became the first player to win the Most Outstanding Canadian Award.

This was the last season that the Ontario Rugby Football Union would be allowed to challenge for the Grey Cup.

== Regular season ==
=== Final regular season standings ===
Note: GP = Games Played, W = Wins, L = Losses, T = Ties, PF = Points For, PA = Points Against, Pts = Points

**Western Interprovincial Football Union**
Team	GP	W	L	T	PF	PA	Pts
**Edmonton Eskimos**	16	11	5	0	255	163	22
**Saskatchewan Roughriders**	16	10	4	2	239	204	22
**Winnipeg Blue Bombers**	16	8	6	2	202	190	18
Calgary Stampeders	16	8	8	0	271	165	16
BC Lions	16	1	15	0	100	345	2

**Interprovincial Rugby Football Union**
Team	GP	W	L	T	PF	PA	Pts
**Montreal Alouettes**	14	11	3	0	341	148	22
**Hamilton Tiger-Cats**	14	9	5	0	275	207	18
Toronto Argonauts	14	6	8	0	212	265	12
Ottawa Rough Riders	14	2	12	0	129	337	4

**Ontario Rugby Football Union**
Team	GP	W	L	T	PF	PA	Pts
**Kitchener-Waterloo Dutchmen**	12	9	2	1	269	183	19
**Sarnia Imperials**	12	7	4	1	218	193	15
Toronto Balmy Beach Beachers	12	1	11	0	169	280	2

- Bold text means that they have clinched the playoffs.
- Edmonton has a bye and will play in the WIFU Finals.

== Grey Cup playoffs ==
Note: All dates in 1954

=== Semifinals ===
WIFU semifinals – game 1
Saskatchewan Roughriders @ Winnipeg Blue Bombers
Date	Away	Home
October 30	Saskatchewan Roughriders 14	Winnipeg Blue Bombers 14

WIFU semifinals – game 2
Winnipeg Blue Bombers @ Saskatchewan Roughriders
Date	Away	Home
November 1	Winnipeg Blue Bombers 13	Saskatchewan Roughriders 11

- Winnipeg won the total-point series by 27–25. The Blue Bombers will play the Edmonton Eskimos in the WIFU Finals.

=== Finals ===
ORFU Finals – Game 1
Sarnia Imperials @ Kitchener-Waterloo Dutchmen
Date	Away	Home
November 3	Sarnia Imperials 12	Kitchener-Waterloo Dutchmen 13

ORFU Finals – Game 2
Kitchener-Waterloo Dutchmen @ Sarnia Imperials
Date	Away	Home
November 11	Kitchener-Waterloo Dutchmen 16	Sarnia Imperials 8

- Kitchener-Waterloo wins the best of three series 2–0. The Dutchmen will advance to the Grey Cup semifinal.

WIFU Finals – Game 1
Winnipeg Blue Bombers @ Edmonton Eskimos
Date	Away	Home
November 6	Winnipeg Blue Bombers 3	Edmonton Eskimos 9

WIFU Finals – Game 2
Edmonton Eskimos @ Winnipeg Blue Bombers
Date	Away	Home
November 11	Edmonton Eskimos 6	Winnipeg Blue Bombers 12

WIFU Finals – Game 3
Winnipeg Blue Bombers @ Edmonton Eskimos
Date	Away	Home
November 13	Winnipeg Blue Bombers 5	Edmonton Eskimos 10

- Edmonton wins the best of three series 2–1. The Eskimos will advance to the Grey Cup semifinal.

IRFU Finals – Game 1
Montreal Alouettes @ Hamilton Tiger-Cats
Date	Away	Home
November 17	Montreal Alouettes 14	Hamilton Tiger-Cats 9

IRFU Finals – Game 2
Hamilton Tiger-Cats @ Montreal Alouettes
Date	Away	Home
November 20	Hamilton Tiger-Cats 19	Montreal Alouettes 24

- Montreal wins the best of three series 2–0. The Alouettes will advance to the Grey Cup game.

=== Grey Cup semifinal ===
Edmonton Eskimos @ Kitchener-Waterloo Dutchmen
Date	Away	Home
November 20	Edmonton Eskimos 38	Kitchener-Waterloo Dutchmen 6

- The Edmonton Eskimos will advance to the Grey Cup game.

== Playoff bracket ==
Quarterfinals
IRFU	Montreal Alouettes
IRFU	BYE
EAST
IRFU	Hamilton Tiger Cats
IRFU	BYE
WIFU	Edmonton Eskimos	9-12-10
WIFU	Winnipeg Blue Bombers	3-6-5
WEST
ORFU	Kitchener-Waterloo Dutchmen	13-16
ORFU	Sarnia Imperials	12-8

Semifinals
IRFU	Montreal Alouettes	14-24
IRFU	Hamilton Tiger Cats	9-19
WIFU	Edmonton Eskimos	38
ORFU	Kitchener-Waterloo Dutchmen	6

Grey Cup
IRFU	Montreal Alouettes	25
WIFU	Edmonton Eskimos	26

- Final appearance in the Grey Cup playoffs by the ORFU

== Grey Cup Championship ==
November 27 42nd Annual Grey Cup Game: Varsity Stadium – Toronto, Ontario
WIFU Champion	IRFU Champion
Edmonton Eskimos 26	Montreal Alouettes 25
The Edmonton Eskimos are the 1954 Grey Cup Champions

== Canadian Football Leaders ==
- CFL passing leaders
- CFL rushing leaders
- CFL receiving leaders

== 1954 Eastern (Interprovincial Rugby Football Union) All-Stars ==
=== Offence ===
- QB – Sam Etcheverry, Montreal Alouettes
- RB – Alex Webster, Montreal Alouettes
- RB – Gene Wilson, Toronto Argonauts
- RB – Bernie Custis, Hamilton Tiger-Cats
- E – Red O'Quinn, Montreal Alouettes
- E – Ray Ramsey, Hamilton Tiger-Cats
- FW – Joey Pal, Montreal Alouettes
- C – Tommy Hugo, Montreal Alouettes
- OG – Ray Cicia, Montreal Alouettes
- OG – Herb Trawick, Montreal Alouettes
- OT – Tex Coulter, Montreal Alouettes
- OT – Vince Mazza, Hamilton Tiger-Cats

=== Defence ===
- DT – Tex Coulter, Montreal Alouettes
- DT – Jim Staton, Montreal Alouettes
- DE – Pete Neumann, Hamilton Tiger-Cats
- DE – Doug McNichol, Montreal Alouettes
- DG – Vince Scott, Hamilton Tiger-Cats
- DG – Eddie Bevan, Hamilton Tiger-Cats
- LB – Red Ettinger, Toronto Argonauts
- LB – Tommy Hugo, Montreal Alouettes
- DB – Lou Kusserow, Hamilton Tiger-Cats
- DB – Hal Patterson, Montreal Alouettes
- S – Bill MacFarlane, Toronto Argonauts
- S - Billy Cross, Toronto Argonauts

== 1954 Western (Western Interprovincial Football Union) All-Stars ==
=== Offence ===
- QB – Frank Tripucka, Saskatchewan Roughriders
- RB – Rollie Miles, Edmonton Eskimos
- RB – Jackie Parker, Edmonton Eskimos
- RB – Howard Waugh, Calgary Stampeders
- RB – Ed Macon, Calgary Stampeders
- E – Mac Speedie, Saskatchewan Roughriders
- E – Bud Grant, Winnipeg Blue Bombers
- C – Eagle Keys, Edmonton Eskimos
- OG – Mario DeMarco, Saskatchewan Roughriders
- OG – Roy Jenson, Calgary Stampeders
- OT – Dick Huffman, Winnipeg Blue Bombers
- OT – Martin Ruby, Saskatchewan Roughriders

=== Defence ===
- DT – Dick Huffman, Winnipeg Blue Bombers
- DT – Martin Ruby, Saskatchewan Roughriders
- DE – Frank Anderson, Edmonton Eskimos
- DE – Gene Brito, Calgary Stampeders
- DG – Mike Cassidy, Saskatchewan Roughriders
- DG – Bob Levenhagen, BC Lions
- LB – John Wozniak, Saskatchewan Roughriders
- LB – Ed Henke, Calgary Stampeders
- DB – Stan Williams, Saskatchewan Roughriders
- DB – Bobby Marlow, Saskatchewan Roughriders
- DB – Rollie Miles, Edmonton Eskimos
- S – Tom Casey, Winnipeg Blue Bombers

== 1954 Ontario Rugby Football Union All-Stars ==
NOTE: During this time most players played both ways, so the All-Star selections do not distinguish between some offensive and defensive positions.

- QB – Bob Celeri, Kitchener-Waterloo Dutchmen
- RB – Cookie Gilchrist, Sarnia Imperials
- RB – Paul Amodio, Kitchener-Waterloo Dutchmen
- RB – Nayland Moll, Toronto Balmy Beach Beachers
- RB – Blake Taylor, Kitchener-Waterloo Dutchmen
- E – Harvey Singleton, Toronto Balmy Beach Beachers
- E – Gerry McTaggart, Kitchener-Waterloo Dutchmen
- FW – Carl Totzke, Kitchener-Waterloo Dutchmen
- C – Bruce Mattingly, Sarnia Imperials
- G – Jay Fry, Kitchener-Waterloo Dutchmen
- G – Lloyd "Dutch" Davey, Sarnia Imperials
- T – Keith Carpenter, Toronto Balmy Beach Beachers
- T – Danny Nykoluk, Toronto Balmy Beach Beachers

== 1954 Canadian Football Awards ==
- Most Outstanding Player Award – Sam Etcheverry (QB), Montreal Alouettes
- Most Outstanding Canadian Award – Gerry James (RB), Winnipeg Blue Bombers
- Jeff Russel Memorial Trophy (IRFU MVP) – Sam Etcheverry (QB), Montreal Alouettes
- Jeff Nicklin Memorial Trophy (WIFU MVP) - Jackie Parker (RB), Edmonton Eskimos
- Gruen Trophy (IRFU Rookie of the Year) - Ron Howell (WR), Hamilton Tiger-Cats
- Dr. Beattie Martin Trophy (WIFU Rookie of the Year) - Lynn Bottoms (HB), Calgary Stampeders
- Imperial Oil Trophy (ORFU MVP) - Bob Celeri - Kitchener-Waterloo Dutchmen
