= Pop Ivy =

American football player and coach (1916–2003)

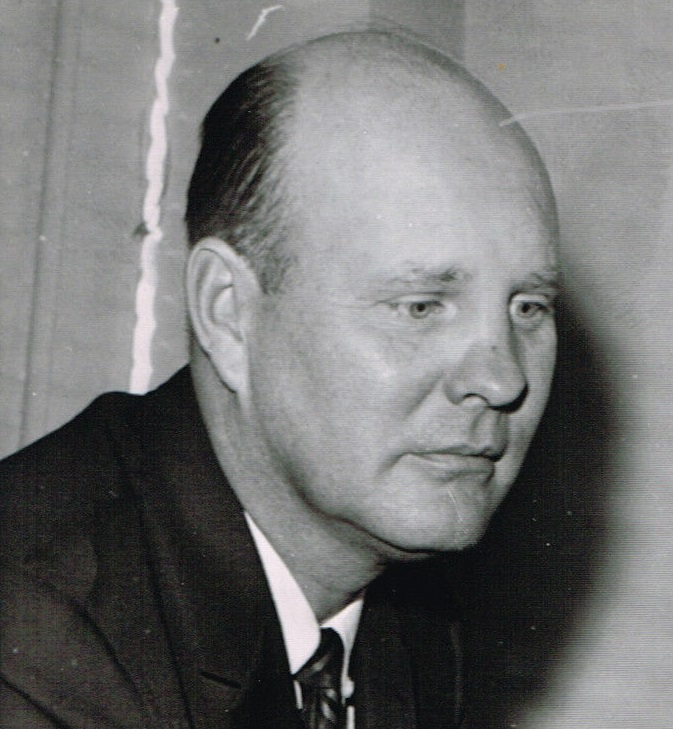
- Ivy in 1961

No. 22, 7, 51, 42
- Position: End

Personal information
- Born: January 25, 1916; Skiatook, Oklahoma, U.S.
- Died: May 17, 2003 (aged 87); Norman, Oklahoma, U.S.
- Listed height: 6 ft 3 in (1.91 m)
- Listed weight: 208 lb (94 kg)

Career information
- High school: Skiatook
- College: Oklahoma (1936–1939)
- NFL draft: 1940: 4th round, 27th overall pick

Career history

Playing
- Pittsburgh Steelers (1940); Chicago Cardinals (1940–1947)

Coaching
- Oklahoma (1948–1953) Assistant coach; Edmonton Eskimos (1954–1957) Head coach; Chicago / St. Louis Cardinals (1958–1961) Head coach; Houston Oilers (1962–1963) Head coach; New York Giants (1965–1966) Defensive coordinator; New York Giants (1971) Offensive line coach

Operations
- Houston Oilers (1962–1963) General manager

Awards and highlights
- As a player: NFL champion (1947); Pro Bowl (1942); First-team All-American (1939); First-team All-Big Six (1939); As a coach: 3× Grey Cup champion (1954–1956)

Career NFL statistics
- Receptions: 53
- Receiving yards: 513
- Touchdowns: 3
- Stats at Pro Football Reference

Head coaching record
- Regular season: WIFU: 50–14 (.781); NFL: 15–31–2 (.333); AFL: 17–11 (.607)
- Postseason: WIFU: 11–4 (.733); AFL: 0–1 (.000)
- Career: WIFU: 61–18 (.772); NFL: 15–31–2 (.333); AFL: 17–12 (.586); Overall: 93–61–2 (.603)
- Coaching profile at Pro Football Reference
- Executive profile at Pro Football Reference
- Canadian Football Hall of Fame (Class of 2026)

Lee Frank "Pop" Ivy (January 25, 1916 – May 17, 2003) was an American football player and coach who was the only person to serve as a head coach in the National Football League (NFL), the American Football League (AFL) and the Western Interprovincial Football Union. He led the Edmonton Eskimos to three consecutive Grey Cup championships in the 1950s.

== College ==
A native of Skiatook, Oklahoma, Ivy was part Native American and earned his nickname because of premature baldness during his playing days. In three years of college football at the University of Oklahoma beginning in 1937, Ivy played both offense and defense for the Sooners, earning All-American honors in 1939 as an end. Ivy never missed a game with the Sooners because of injury, and showed his clutch ability in a 1939 game against the arch-rival Texas Longhorns. Catching a deflected pass late in the contest, Ivy scored the go-ahead touchdown.

== NFL ==
Ivy was drafted by the Pittsburgh Steelers in the 1940 NFL draft, but was traded to the Chicago Cardinals on October 17. He would continue to see action on both sides of the ball throughout the rest of his NFL career, and in 1942, he had his best season with 27 receptions, second behind the legendary Don Hutson. His time on the gridiron was interrupted for more than two years by his service in World War II, but he closed out his career in 1947 by helping the franchise to its only NFL title. Ivy was on the sidelines for the NFL Championship, having separated his shoulder just weeks earlier.

== Coaching ==
=== College ===
In 1948, Ivy entered the coaching ranks when he was hired as an assistant to Bud Wilkinson at his alma mater, spending six seasons with the Sooners. During this time, the team popularized the Split-T formation, helping the 1950 squad capture the national championship.

=== Canadian football ===
Ivy headed north on March 10, 1954, to become head coach of the Edmonton Eskimos of the WIFU. Over the next four years, Ivy compiled a record of 50–14, starting off his tenure with three consecutive Grey Cup championships. His most daring move came prior to the 1956 title game, when he moved quarterback Jackie Parker to running back and inserted Canadian Don Getty. The result was a 50–27 victory over the Montreal Alouettes.

He also became known as an innovator in Canadian football, taking advantage of the more wide-open game by using strategies such as the twin fullback system, the quick snap and the short kickoff. In addition, he came up with the formation known as the "lonesome quarterback", later to be renamed the "shotgun".

=== NFL ===
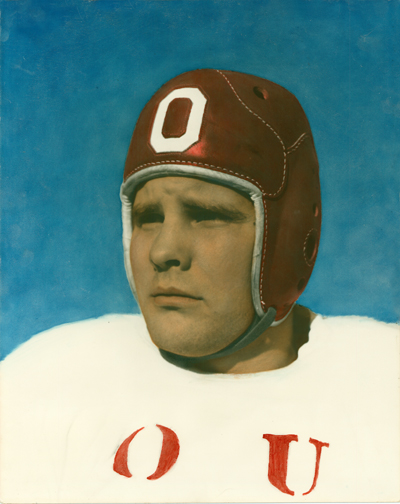

Following a 14–2 season with the Eskimos in 1957, Ivy's old team, the Cardinals, induced him to accept the head coaching position on January 9, 1958. During his first two seasons in Chicago, Ivy struggled with a 4–19–1 mark, with one rumor in December 1958 having Ivy ready to return to Canada to coach the BC Lions. Following the Cardinals' relocation to St. Louis after the 1959 NFL season, the team improved to 6–5–1 in 1960, but then fell to 5–7 before Ivy resigned on December 6, 1961. While he publicly stated that he had "not accomplished the desired results", Ivy's decision reportedly stemmed from a growing feud with team Director of Operations Walter Wolfner.

Ivy was first sought by the AFL's Denver Broncos, but instead signed with the two-time AFL champion Houston Oilers on March 5, 1962, where he coached the next two seasons. The coaching change completed an odd "trade" of sorts: Oilers coach Wally Lemm resigned to become head coach of the Cardinals.

During Ivy's first year, the team again won the conference title with an 11–3 record, but dropped a classic 20–17 double overtime decision in the 1962 AFL Championship to the Dallas Texans. That success resulted in the CFL Alouettes team seeking his services, but on February 14, 1963, Ivy signed a two-year deal with the Oilers that gave him complete personnel authority.

The team slipped to 6–8 that season, the team's first-ever losing season, but Ivy's job security appeared to be in good shape. He hired Sammy Baugh as an assistant the following May, but was shocked when he was fired on June 1 and replaced by Baugh.

=== Scouting ===
Ivy soon found work as a scout for the New York Giants, then was hired as an assistant coach with the team on February 3, 1965. After two seasons, the last a disastrous 1–12–1 campaign, Owner Wellington Mara enacted a new Club rule stating that all coaching staff must live in the New York/New Jersey area year round. A lifelong resident of Oklahoma, Ivy and his wife Inez did not want to leave Norman, Oklahoma for good. Mara asked Ivy to stay on as a scout which Ivy agreed to, but then returned to coaching in 1971 for three more seasons. Following the firing of head coach Alex Webster, Ivy again returned to scouting, where he spent the next decade before announcing his retirement in 1984.
