= Herb Trawick =

American and Canadian football player (1921–1985)

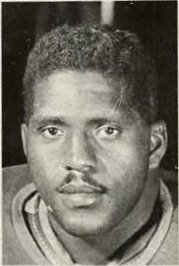
- Trawick with the Montreal Alouettes in 1946

Profile
- Positions: Guard, Offensive tackle, Defensive lineman

Personal information
- Born: February 22, 1921; Pittsburgh, Pennsylvania, U.S.
- Died: September 16, 1985 (aged 64); Montreal, Quebec, Canada

Career information
- College: Kentucky State College for Negroes

Career history
- 1946–1957: Montreal Alouettes

Awards and highlights
- Grey Cup champion (1949); 7× CFL East All-Star (1946–1950, 1954–1955)
- Canadian Football Hall of Fame (Class of 1975)

Herb Trawick (February 22, 1921 – September 16, 1985) was a professional Canadian football player and was the first African American to play professional Canadian football. Trawick spent his entire 12-year career as an offensive lineman and defensive guard with the Montreal Alouettes.

== College career and military service ==
Trawick attended Kentucky State College for Negroes and graduated with a degree in physical education. He was a three-time All-American in football, from 1940 to 1942. After school he enlisted in the U.S. Army during World War II.

== Professional career ==
Lew Hayman and Leo Dandurand were managing the new Montreal Alouettes franchise in 1946, and they did not fail to notice how popular and well-received the first black baseball player in the pros, Jackie Robinson (when he played minor league ball with the Montreal Royals), was. They were determined to have a black player on their team.

Trawick was not their first choice, but he was the best. Surprisingly quick for 178 cm (5 ft 10 in) and 104 kg (230 lb), he went on to play 12 seasons (1946–1957) with the Larks, 147 regular-season games in all, and be voted an Interprovincial Rugby Football Union All Star seven times. When he retired in 1957, Trawick was the only "original" Alouette remaining with the team.

He also played in four Grey Cup games, scoring a touchdown on a fumble recovery in the Als' 1949 Grey Cup championship win against the Calgary Stampeders. Trawick played in the three-game Grey Cup set against the Edmonton Eskimos from 1954 to 1956, and had a touchdown on a fumble return called back in the classic 42nd Grey Cup game.

Though he was welcomed in Montreal and made it his home, things were not perfect. Though university educated, he could only find work as a doorman. He became a Canadian citizen in 1953. He was noted for his generous community charity work.

== Awards and honours ==
Much loved by his fans, Trawick's jersey No. 56 is one of seven retired by the Alouettes. Trawick was elected to the Canadian Football Hall of Fame and the Kentucky State University Athletics Hall of Fame in 1975.

Trawick died on September 16, 1985, in his adopted home town of Montreal. On July 16, 1997, a park was named in his honour by the City of Montreal. Parc Herb-Trawick is situated southwest of the intersection of Lionel-Groulx Avenue and Richmond Street.

In 2006, Trawick was voted to the Honour Roll of the Canadian Football League's Top 50 players of the sport's modern era by Canadian sports network TSN.

== Professional wrestling career ==
Trawick also spent time as a professional wrestler.

== See also ==
- List of gridiron football players who became professional wrestlers
