= Bob Dean =

American gridiron football player (1929–2007)

Dean in 1953

Bob Dean (December 17, 1929 – May 10, 2007) was a kicker and two-way lineman with the Edmonton Eskimos of the Western Interprovincial Football Union.

== Early life and education ==
Dean was born December 17, 1929. He played college football at the University of Maryland, where he lettered from 1948 to 1950. He graduated with a BA degree in education.

He attempted to land a place on the Washington Redskins of the National Football League (NFL) ahead of the 1953 season but was cut when the team reduced its roster from 43 to the league maximum of 33 men in late September.

Dean enjoyed three highly successful years with the Eskimos team. He played in three Grey Cup games, from 1954 to 1956, against the Montreal Alouettes, winning all of them. His convert on Jackie Parker's famous 90-yard fumble return was the winning point in the 42nd Grey Cup classic.

Dean retired from playing after the 1957 season after playing just one game that year for the Montreal Alouettes.

After retirement he made Edmonton his home and continued to coach. He was a teacher at Victoria Composite High School, where he coached of City Senior Football Champions in 1966 and 1967. At Bonnie Doon Composite, where he was assistant principal, the team won two City Senior Football titles (1971 and 1972 City and Provincial Champion) with Dean as Defensive Coordinator of the Lancers. (Ken Brice was the Head Coach). Later he was principal at Victoria and at M.E. Lazerte Composite High School, where he coached his teams to four more City Senior Football championships.

He later served on the Edmonton Police Commission and the Edmonton Public School Board.
