= Bud Korchak =

Canadian football player

Profile
- Positions: Flying Wing, Kicker

Personal information
- Born: August 15, 1927; Winnipeg, Manitoba
- Died: February 5, 2010 (aged 82); Winnipeg, Manitoba

Career information
- College: St. John's Grads & Elmwood

Career history
- 1949–54: Winnipeg Blue Bombers
- 1955–56: Montreal Alouettes
- 1956: Ottawa Rough Riders
- 1957: Calgary Stampeders

Awards and highlights
- 3× CFL West All-Star (1951, 52, 53); Dave Dryburgh Memorial Trophy (1953)

Borden Walter "Bud" Korchak was a Canadian professional football player. He was nicknamed the "Golden Toe" and the "Ukrainian Gazelle".

A native of Winnipeg, Korchak played junior football with the St. John's Grads and intermediate football with Elmwood before moving up to the Winnipeg Blue Bombers. He was a flying wing (flanker/slotback in more modern terms) and also one of the best placekickers in the early 1950s. Korchak played six seasons for the Bombers (1949-54), and was the West's All-Star Flying Wing in 1952 and 1953 (there were no CFL All-Stars until 1962). Korchak finished third in the West in scoring in 1952 with 69 points and led the West in scoring in 1953 with 66 points, winning the Dave Dryburgh Memorial Trophy. Most impressive perhaps was his convert percentage in 1952 when he scored on 29 of 31 extra point attempts for a 93% success rate, very good for that era. In 1955, Korchak joined the powerful Montreal Alouettes team and his 60-point total was good for fifth in the East. That season, Korchak booted an astounding 49 converts in 52 attempts in just 14 games for a 94.2% success rate. He split the 1956 season between Montreal and Ottawa and finished his career with the Calgary Stampeders in 1957. His best seasons as a receiver were 1951, with 34 catches for 491 yards and 1952, with 31 catches for 551 yards. He scored 334 total points.

Korchak was elected to the Winnipeg Blue Bombers Hall of Fame in 1996. He died February 5, 2010.
