= 43rd Grey Cup =

1955 Canadian Football championship game

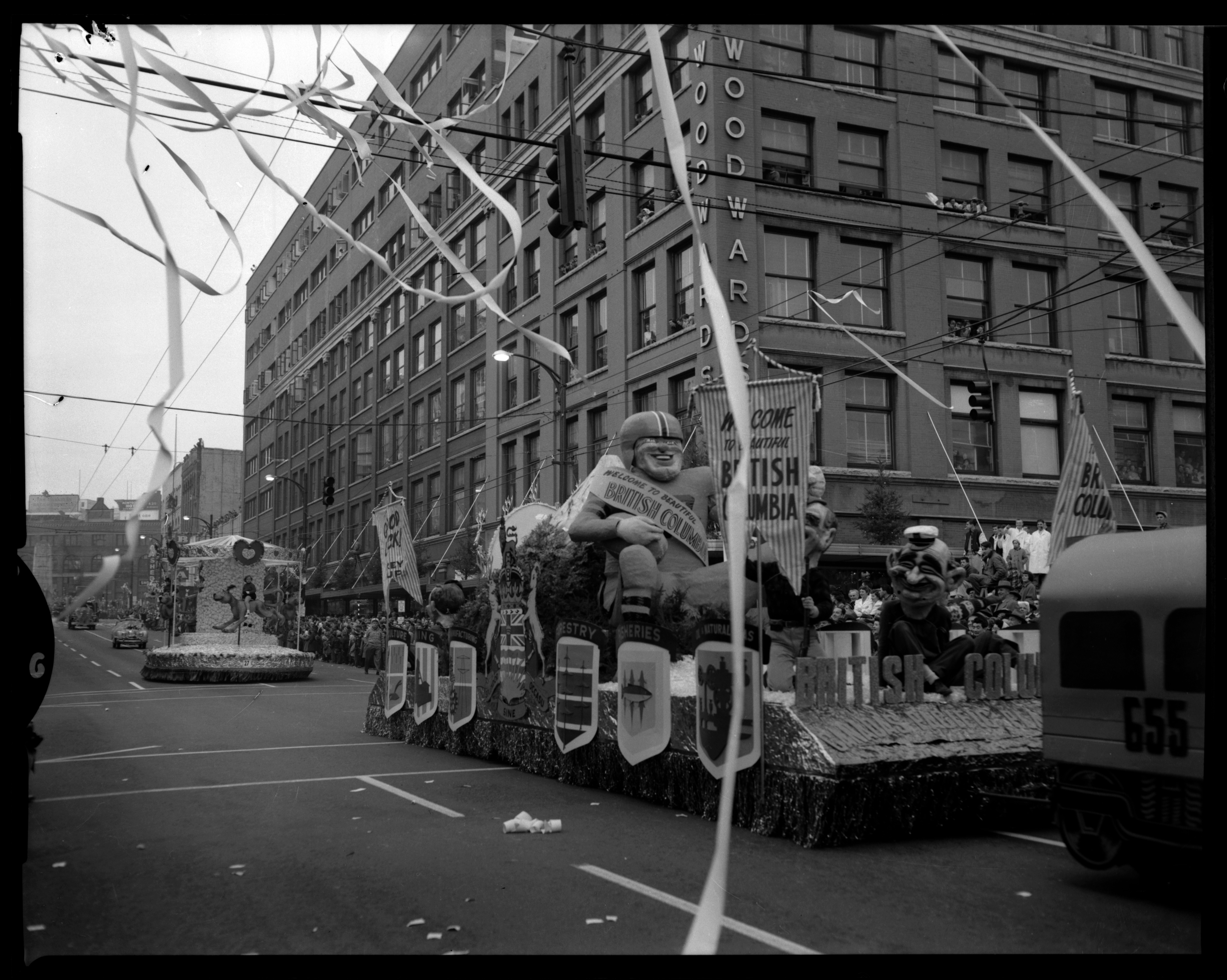
Edmonton Eskimos	Montreal Alouettes
(14–2)	(8–4)
34	19
Head coach: Pop Ivy	Head coach: Peahead Walker
	1	2	3	4	Total
Edmonton Eskimos	6	12	12	4	34
Montreal Alouettes	13	6	0	0	19
- Date: November 26, 1955
- Stadium: Empire Stadium
- Location: Vancouver
- Attendance: 39,417

Broadcasters
- Network: CBC
- Announcers: Steve Douglas, Bill Stephenson

The 43rd Grey Cup game was played on November 26, 1955, before 39,417 football fans at Empire Stadium in Vancouver.

The game was the first Grey Cup to be played in Western Canada. The game had typically been played in Toronto previously, however the then-recently-completed Empire Stadium was the largest venue in the country. In a somewhat related development, the two professional unions (the Interprovincial Rugby Football Union in the east and the Western Interprovincial Football Union in the west) had informally agreed to co-ordinate their schedules in a manner which effectively forced the amateur Ontario Rugby Football Union to withdraw from Grey Cup competition. This made the 1955 championship game the first in which the Western champion had a de facto automatic berth in the Grey Cup game.

In a rematch of the previous year's Grey Cup, the Edmonton Eskimos defeated the Montreal Alouettes by the score of 34–19.

== Box Score ==
First quarter

Montreal - Single - Bud Korchak missed field goal
Edmonton – TD – Normie Kwong 1-yard run (Bob Dean convert)
Montreal – TD – Pat Abbruzzi 1-yard run (Bud Korchak convert)
Montreal – TD – Hal Patterson 41-yard pass from Sam Etcheverry (Bud Korchak convert)

Second quarter

Edmonton – TD – Johnny Bright 42-yard run (Bob Dean convert)
Montreal – TD – Hal Patterson 15-yard pass from Sam Etcheverry (Bud Korchak convert)
Edmonton – TD – Bob Heydenfeldt 15-yard pass from Jackie Parker (Bob Dean convert)

Third quarter

Edmonton – TD – Normie Kwong 1-yard run (Bob Dean convert)
Edmonton – TD – Johnny Bright 3-yard run (Bob Dean convert)

Fourth quarter

Edmonton – Single – Bob Dean missed field goal
Edmonton – FG – Bob Dean 20-yard field goal

Team	1 Q	2 Q	3 Q	4 Q	Final
Edmonton Eskimos	6	12	12	4	34
Montreal Alouettes	13	6	0	0	19

== Trivia ==
This was the last professional Canadian football game with touchdowns valued at five points - the value of this scoring play was changed to six points, thus making it identical with that of its long-standing value in American football, prior to the start of the following season.

Montreal Alouettes quarterback Sam Etcheverry set a Grey Cup record with 508 passing yards. Normie Kwong rushed 30 times for 145 yards for Edmonton.

The game was held in Vancouver for the first time, and outside of Ontario for only the second time. The attendance was a record that would last until 1976.

This was the second of 11 Grey Cup clashes between Edmonton and Montreal. The Eskimos have won in 1954, 1955, 1956, 1975, 1978, 1979, 2003 and 2005's overtime thriller. The Larks have prevailed in 1974, the Ice Bowl of 1977, and 2002.
