= Gerry MacTaggart =

Canadian football player

Profile
- Positions: End, Halfback

Personal information
- Born: c. 1931; Lindsay, Ontario, Canada
- Died: January 12, 2017; Ontario, Canada
- Listed height: 6 ft 3 in (1.91 m)
- Listed weight: 185 lb (84 kg)

Career history
- 1953: Hamilton Tiger-Cats

Awards and highlights
- Grey Cup champion (1953)

William Gerald Lorne MacTaggart (c. 1931 – January 12, 2017) was a Canadian professional football player who played for the Hamilton Tiger-Cats. He won the Grey Cup with the Hamilton Tiger-Cats in 1953. He previously attended and played football and basketball at McMaster University. MacTaggart later played with the Kitchener-Waterloo Dutchmen in the ORFU. In 1989, he was inducted into the McMaster Maurauders Hall of Fame. He died from heart failure in 2017.
