= Red O'Quinn =

American football player (1925–2002)

John O'Quinn
No. 37, 81
- Position: End

Personal information
- Born: September 7, 1925; Bluett Falls, North Carolina, U.S.
- Died: April 21, 2002 (aged 76); Ottawa, Ontario, Canada
- Listed height: 6 ft 2 in (1.88 m)
- Listed weight: 195 lb (88 kg)

Career information
- High school: Asheboro (Asheboro, North Carolina)
- College: Wake Forest
- NFL draft: 1949: 3rd round, 31st overall pick

Career history
- 1950–1951: Chicago Bears
- 1951: Philadelphia Eagles
- 1952–1959: Montreal Alouettes

Awards and highlights
- 5× CFL All-Star (1952–1955, 1958); First-team All-SoCon (1948); Second-team All-SoCon (1949)
- Stats at Pro Football Reference
- Canadian Football Hall of Fame (Class of 1981)

John William "Red" O'Quinn (September 7, 1925 – April 21, 2002) was a gridiron football end.

== Early life ==
John William "Red" O'Quinn, Jr. was born in Bluett Falls, North Carolina. He graduated from Asheboro High School in Asheboro, North Carolina in 1943. He was inducted in the Asheboro High School Athletic Hall of Fame in 2004.

O'Quinn played college football at Wake Forest University between 1946 and 1949. He was a star receiver, with 1,974 career yards. His best year was in 1948, when he led the nation with 39 catches for 605 yards and seven touchdowns. He was inducted into the Wake Forest Sports Hall of Fame in 1975.

== Professional career ==
=== NFL ===
O'Quinn was drafted by the National Football League's Chicago Bears in the 1949 NFL draft, in the third round, 31st overall. He would play 12 games for the Bears in 1950, intercepting three passes and returning one for a touchdown. He played two games with the Bears in 1951 before being traded to the Philadelphia Eagles, where he played two more games and caught three passes.

=== CFL ===
Red would move north to the Montreal Alouettes of the Canadian Football League, where he would play eight seasons (1952–1959) and 110 regular season games. He teamed up with CFL great Sam Etcheverry to form one of the best pass and catch tandems in league history. He caught 499 passes for 7,699 yards and 34 touchdowns in his career (all team records until Ben Cahoon broke them) and was a five-time all-star.

He played in three Grey Cup losses, though the classic 1954 42nd Grey Cup may have been his finest game. He caught a record 13 passes for a record 316 receiving yards, with 90 of those coming on one of the best pass touchdowns in Grey Cup history (and the second longest ever).

== Post playing days ==
After his playing days and a short stint in industry, Red returned to football as general manager for the Ottawa Rough Riders from 1962 to 1969, winning a pair of Grey Cups in 1968 and 1969. Red returned to the Montreal Alouettes in 1970 as general manager, where he teamed with his old friend and former QB Sam Ectheverry as the Alouettes new head coach. Together they took the team from last place to Grey Cup Champions in their first year together.

He was inducted into the Canadian Football Hall of Fame in 1981.

Red died in Ottawa, Ontario, on April 21, 2002, at the age of 76.

== See also ==
- List of NCAA major college football yearly receiving leaders
