= Tommy Hugo =

Canadian football player (1930–2004)

Tom Hugo
Profile
- Positions: Center, Linebacker

Personal information
- Born: August 25, 1930; Honolulu, Hawaii, U.S.
- Died: November 15, 2004 (aged 74)
- Listed height: 5 ft 10 in (1.78 m)
- Listed weight: 220 lb (100 kg)

Career information
- College: Denver

Career history
- 1953–1959: Montreal Alouettes

Awards and highlights
- 7× CFL East All-Star (1953–1959)
- Canadian Football Hall of Fame (Class of 2018)

Tom Hugo (August 25, 1930 – November 15, 2004) was a Canadian Football League (CFL) offensive lineman and linebacker who played seven seasons for the Montreal Alouettes from 1953 to 1959. He was a Montreal All-Star 12 times (1953 offence, 1954–1958 both offence and defence, 1959 defence) during his seven seasons in the CFL. Besides being an All-Star at centre every season he played, he also intercepted 25 passes (9 alone in 1958) and returned two for touchdowns, and also returned kickoffs. September 2018. Hugo was inducted into the Canadian Football League Hall of Fame as a player in 2018.

Hugo played collegiate football for the University of Denver, where he was the center under future CFL legend Sam Etcheverry.
