= 44th Grey Cup =

1956 Canadian Football championship game

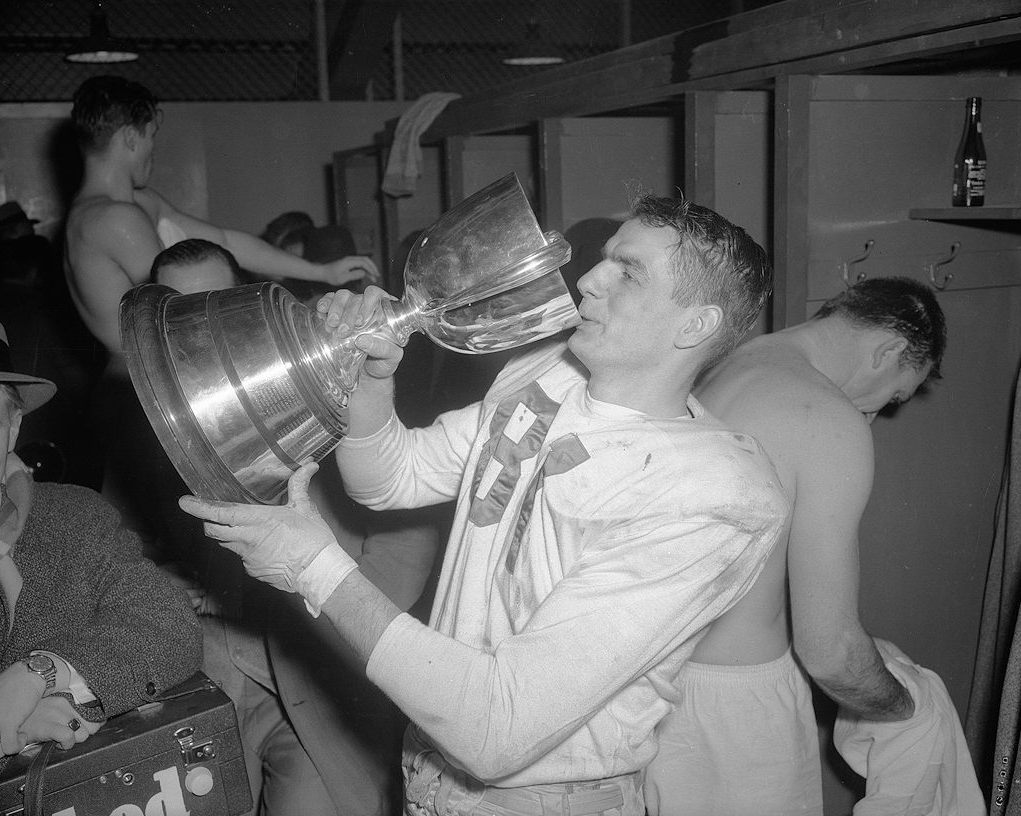
- Don Getty after the game
Edmonton Eskimos	Montreal Alouettes
(11–5)	(10–4)
50	27
Head coach: Pop Ivy	Head coach: Peahead Walker
	1	2	3	4	Total
Edmonton Eskimos	6	13	18	13	50
Montreal Alouettes	7	7	6	7	27
- Date: November 24, 1956
- Stadium: Varsity Stadium
- Location: Toronto
- Attendance: 27,425

Broadcasters
- Network: CBC
- Announcers: Steve Douglas, Ted Reynolds

The 44th Grey Cup game was played on November 24, 1956, before 27,425 fans at Varsity Stadium in Toronto.

The favoured Edmonton Eskimos won their third straight Grey Cup over the Montreal Alouettes by the score of 50–27.

Edmonton coach Pop Ivy surprised many by starting sophomore Canadian quarterback Don Getty. With Jackie Parker, Johnny Bright, Normie Kwong and Rollie Miles in the backfield, they were record setters. Bright rushed for a then Grey Cup record 169 yards (surpassed by Kory Sheets in 2013), and Parker added another 129, and the Eskimos team total was a record 456 yards. Montreal rushed for 191 yards, so both teams set a single Grey Cup game record of 647 yards.

Montreal had the game tied as late as the third quarter (20 to 20) before Edmonton took total control. While Getty scored two touchdowns, Sam Etcheverry had one of his most disappointing days as a Lark, completing only 15 of 38 passes for 293 yards and a Grey Cup record 4 interceptions.

== Scoring ==
Edmonton Eskimos - 50
Touchdowns - Jackie Parker (3); Don Getty (2); Johnny Bright (2)
Field Goal - Bob Dean
Converts - Bob Dean (4)
Single - Jackie Parker (1)

Montreal Alouettes - 27
Touchdowns - Hal Patterson (2); Sam Etcheverry (1); Pat Abbruzzi (1)
Converts - Bill Bewley (3)

== Trivia ==
This was the first Grey Cup game with 6 point touchdowns.

The game scorer incorrectly recorded the final score as 51 to 27. Jackie Parker scored a touchdown on the final play, and fans flooded the end zone and one stole the game ball. As most of the game officials had left the field, Edmonton could not convert the touchdown, for lack of a ball. The officials ended the game without the final convert.

This was the third of 11 Grey Cup clashes between Edmonton and Montreal. The Eskimos have won in 1954, 1955, 1956, 1975, 1978, 1979, 2003 and 2005's overtime thriller. The Alouettes prevailed in 1974, the Ice Bowl of 1977, and 2002.

Two of the Eskimos' stars from this game would go on to notable political and business careers. Getty served as Premier of Alberta from 1985 until 1992. Kwong, whose notable business ventures included part ownership of the NHL's Calgary Flames, served as Lieutenant Governor of Alberta from 2005 until 2010.
