= Nayland Moll =

Profile
- Positions: FW, Halfback

Personal information
- Born: c. 1933
- Listed height: 5 ft 10 in (1.78 m)
- Listed weight: 170 lb (77 kg)

Career history
- 1955: Toronto Argonauts
- 1957: Ottawa Rough Riders

Nayland Moll (born c. 1933) is a former Canadian football player who played for the Toronto Argonauts and Ottawa Rough Riders.
