= Joey Pal =

Canadian football player

No. 82
- Position: Slotback

Personal information
- Born: August 27, 1927; Hamilton, Ontario, Canada
- Died: October 13, 2012 (aged 85); Hamilton, Ontario, Canada

Career information
- College: Sir George William University

Career history
- 1947: Hamilton Tigers
- 1948, 1950–1957: Montreal Alouettes

Awards and highlights
- CFL All-Star (1956)

Joseph Stephen Pal (August 27, 1927 – October 13, 2012) was a Canadian professional football player with the Montreal Alouettes for nine seasons. Pal was a three time East All-Star at flying wing (1954, 1955, and 1956).
