= Norman Kwong =

Canadian football player and politician (1929–2016)

The Honourable Norman Kwong CM AOE
- 林佐民
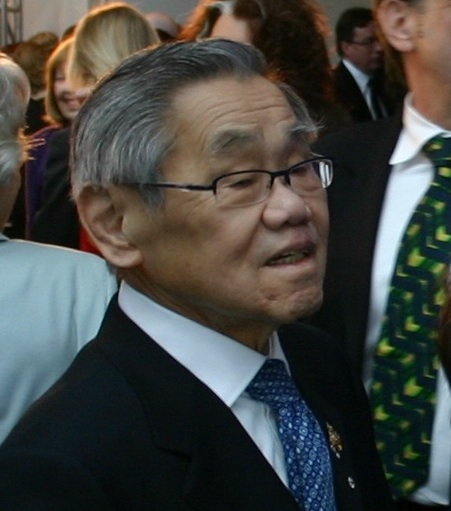
- Kwong in 2012

16th Lieutenant Governor of Alberta
- In office January 20, 2005 – May 11, 2010
- Monarch: Elizabeth II
- Governors General: Adrienne Clarkson; Michaëlle Jean
- Premier: Ralph Klein; Ed Stelmach
- Preceded by: Lois Hole
- Succeeded by: Donald Ethell

Personal details
- Born: Kwong Lim Yew; October 24, 1929 Calgary, Alberta, Canada
- Died: September 3, 2016 (aged 86) Calgary, Alberta, Canada
- Party: Progressive Conservative
- Spouse: Mary Kwong (m. 1960)
- Profession: Football player; businessman; politician
- Football career
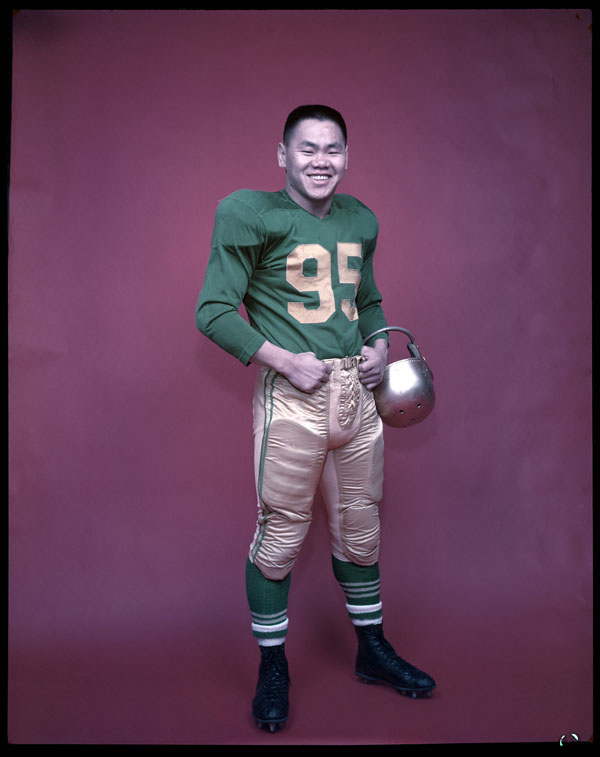

No. 15, 95
- Position: Running back

Personal information
- Listed height: 5 ft 7 in (1.70 m)
- Listed weight: 170 lb (77 kg)

Career history
- Calgary Stampeders (1948–1950); Edmonton Eskimos (1951–1960)

Awards and highlights
- 4× Grey Cup champion (1948, 1954, 1955, 1956); Eddie James Memorial Trophy (1951); Lionel Conacher Award (1955); 4× CFL West All-Star (1951, 1953, 1955, 1956); Eskimos record: Most rushing touchdowns – career (73)
- Canadian Football Hall of Fame (Class of 1969)

Norman Lim Kwong CM AOE (born Kwong Lim Yew; Chinese: 林佐民; October 24, 1929 – September 3, 2016) was a Canadian professional football player who played for the Calgary Stampeders and Edmonton Eskimos of the Canadian Football League (CFL). He was also an active businessman and politician being part owner of the Calgary Flames and serving as the 16th lieutenant governor of Alberta from January 2005 to May 2010.

The son of Chinese immigrants from Taishan, Guangdong, Kwong was the first Canadian professional football player of Chinese heritage. In addition, Kwong was also the first person of Chinese heritage to serve as lieutenant governor of Alberta. As a former vice-regal representative of Alberta, he was styled "The Honourable" for life. Kwong was the third Canadian of Chinese heritage to be appointed as a vice-regal in Canada, after David Lam and Adrienne Clarkson.

Kwong's life and legacy are the focus of a Heritage Minute short film, made in Calgary in late 2023, and released on February 13, 2024.

== Early life ==
Kwong was born to a Chinese immigrant family in Calgary, Alberta, on October 24, 1929. His father, Charles Lim Kwong, immigrated to Canada in 1907 and had to pay the head tax, and his mother, Lily Lee, immigrated with her family in 1912. Their marriage was arranged by their parents. They lived in British Columbia at first. Still, they moved to Calgary because anti-Chinese discrimination was less severe there, and Charles could open his own business, the Riverside Cash and Carry Store. Norman (Lim Kwong Yew) was the fifth of six siblings. They were lucky to have both parents in Canada, as family reunion was restricted at the time for Chinese Canadians and many children grew up with one parent.

== Sports career ==
In 1947, Canada's Chinese Exclusion Act was repealed for contravening the United Nations' Universal Declaration of Human Rights. Chinese Canadians were given citizen rights for the first time, and barriers for Chinese in professional sports also came down.

After playing Canadian football at Western Canada High School, Kwong went on to play for the Calgary Stampeders from 1948 to 1950 and, after a trade, the Edmonton Eskimos from 1951 until his retirement in 1960. Nicknamed the "China Clipper" (a reference to the speedy clipper ships), Kwong was the first Chinese Canadian to play on a professional Canadian football team. A powerful fullback, in 11 years of recorded statistics Kwong rushed for 9,022 yards for an average of 5.2 yards per carry and scored 93 touchdowns. He won the Grey Cup four times during his career (1948, 1954, 1955, and 1956). Kwong was a Western Conference all-star running back and three-time winner of the Eddie James Memorial Trophy, in 1951, 1955, and 1956. He was named the Schenley Most Outstanding Canadian in 1955 and 1956. He was named Canadian Athlete of the Year in 1955. He was inducted into the Canadian Football Hall of Fame in 1969, Canada's Sports Hall of Fame in 1975, the Edmonton Eskimos' Wall of Honour in 1983, the Alberta Sports Hall of Fame in 1980, and the Calgary Stampeders' Wall of Fame in 2012 (as a builder of that sports organization). In November 2006, he was one of very few of his contemporaries to be voted one of the Canadian Football League's Top 50 players of the sport's modern era by Canadian sports network TSN. Kwong was the first Canadian-born player to rush for 1,000 yards in a season (1,250 in 1955) and set the CFL record for the most yards rushing by a Canadian in a season with 1,437 in the 1956 season. (Note: Kwong was the first Canadian-born player to rush for 1,000 yards in a season, doing so on October 15, 1955, against the Saskatchewan Roughriders, gaining 56 yards for 1028 total. On October 22, against the Winnipeg Blue Bombers, he added another 30 yards for 1058, thus breaking the all-time single-season rushing record held by Howard Waugh (1,043). Just two days later Gerry James of the Blue Bombers became the second Canadian player to top 1,000 yards in a season, rushing for 143 yards against the BC Lions, and his total of 1,080 became the new single-season record. Not to be outdone, Kwong took the record back during the last game of the season on October 29, rushing for 192 yards against the Calgary Stampeders and finishing with 1,250 yards. See: "Second Stringers Clash and Riders Top Esks 4-3", Calgary Herald, Oct. 17, 1955, p.28 and "WIFU Playoffs Set; Als, Ticats Get Wins", Calgary Herald, Oct. 24, 1955, p.24 and "Lions Counted Out", Calgary Herald, Oct. 25, 1955, p.24 and "Kwong Blasts Inept Stamps", Calgary Herald, Oct. 31, 1955, p.32.) This record held for 56 years, being broken by Jon Cornish only in 2012, though Kwong accomplished his record in fifteen games, rather than eighteen for Cornish.

He was president and general manager of the Calgary Stampeders from 1988 to 1991, leading the team to a loss in the Grey Cup final in 1991. Between 1980 and 1994, Kwong was a part owner of the Calgary Flames, having been one of the original group of six Calgary businessmen who bought and moved the NHL's Atlanta Flames hockey team to Calgary in 1980. The Calgary Flames won the Stanley Cup in 1989, making him one of five people whose name is on both the Grey Cup and the Stanley Cup. The feat was later matched by Wayne Gretzky, who in an interesting symmetry to Kwong's achievement has his name on the Stanley Cup four times as a player and on the Grey Cup once as an owner.

== Public service career ==
Kwong's public stature from sports helped him move on to politics and government. In 1971 he ran for the Alberta Progressive Conservative party in Calgary-Millican. In this election, the PCs ended Social Credit's 36-year hold on power, winning all but five seats in Calgary. However, Kwong himself was defeated by longtime incumbent Arthur J. Dixon who won by a 1,600 vote plurality.

In 1988 Kwong was made a member of the Order of Canada and served as the national chairman of the Canadian Consultative Council on Multiculturalism. Kwong was appointed Lieutenant-Governor of Alberta on January 20, 2005, replacing Lois Hole, who died in office on January 6, 2005. Kwong welcomed Queen Elizabeth II to Alberta in June 2005 on a visit commemorating Alberta's first 100 years in Canadian Confederation. During a private audience, the Queen presented Kwong with the insignia of a Knight of Justice in the Most Venerable Order of the Hospital of St John of Jerusalem.

Kwong swore Ed Stelmach into office as the 13th Premier of Alberta on December 14, 2006. Kwong's term concluded on May 11, 2010, and he was succeeded by Don Ethell.

== Personal life ==
Kwong married Mary Lee on March 26, 1960, and together they had four sons: Gregory, Bradley, Martin, and Randall. He died in his sleep on September 3, 2016, at the age of 86. He was survived by his wife, four sons, and ten grandchildren.

== Arms ==
Coat of arms of Norman Kwong
Notes The arms of Norman Kwong consist of: Crest Issuant from a coronet Argent the upper rim set with flames proper, a demi-horse Argent winged Or holding a wild rose proper. Escutcheon Barry Or and Vert on a bend Vert three footballs Or. Supporters Two Lim dragons (i.e., a Chinese dragon with the hindquarters of an Albertosaurus) per fess Or and Vert. Compartment Tapissé of wheat Or set with wild roses proper. Motto Strive to Excel Symbolism The shield represents a Canadian football field viewed from above with the 10-yard lines defined by the bands of green and gold. The colours are the team colours of the Edmonton Eskimos, the Canadian Football League team for which His Honour played and starred. The green band symbolizes a swift path across the field, while the three gold footballs refer to the speed of his advancing the play. The white horse is a reference to the Calgary Stampeders, His Honour’s first football team. The wings refer to His Honour’s nickname, “the China Clipper”, earned from his energetic play, and derived from the airplane of the same name. The rose refers to Her Honour Mary Kwong, an avid gardener who has played a singular role in His Honour’s life as his loving wife and greatest companion. The white circlet with red flames symbolizes His Honour’s long involvement with and ownership of, the Calgary Flames hockey team, the colours of which are the national colours red and white. The supporters are two mythical creatures that have been named “Lim dragons”, referring to the Lieutenant Governor’s Chinese heritage. They are made from the upper part of a Chinese dragon and the lower part of the Albertosaurus, a dinosaur named for the province. The grain fields represent one of the province’s important and historic sources of wealth, while the wild roses are the provincial floral emblem and refer to His Honour’s family.

== Honours ==

Ribbon	Description	Notes
	Order of Canada (CM)	Member; October 21, 1998
	Order of St. John (K.StJ)	Knight of Justice; June 2005
	Alberta Order of Excellence (AOE)	2005
	125th Anniversary of the Confederation of Canada Medal	1992
	Queen Elizabeth II Golden Jubilee Medal	2002; Canadian Version of this Medal
	Queen Elizabeth II Diamond Jubilee Medal	2012; Canadian Version of this Medal
	Alberta Centennial Medal	2005

- In 2006 Kwong received an Honorary Degree of Doctor of Laws from the University of Alberta.

== See also ==
- The Honourable David Lam – former Lieutenant Governor of British Columbia and Canada's first vice-regal of Chinese heritage
- The Right Honourable Adrienne Clarkson – former Governor General of Canada and the first Chinese Canadian to serve in the post
- Larry Kwong, the original "China Clipper", former NHL hockey player and first Chinese-Canadian NHL player
- Lost Years: A People's Struggle for Justice
- Peter Ing former NHL goaltender
- Philip S. Lee, former Lieutenant Governor of Manitoba
