= 42nd Grey Cup =

1954 Canadian Football championship game

Edmonton Eskimos	Montreal Alouettes
(11–5)	(11–3)
26	25
Head coach: Pop Ivy	Head coach: Peahead Walker
	1	2	3	4	Total
Edmonton Eskimos	11	3	0	12	26
Montreal Alouettes	6	12	1	6	25
- Date: November 27, 1954
- Stadium: Varsity Stadium
- Location: Toronto
- Attendance: 27,321

Broadcasters
- Network: CBC
- Announcers: Steve Douglas, Jack Wells

The 42nd Grey Cup football game was played on November 27, 1954, before a full house (27,321 in attendance) at Varsity Stadium in Toronto, Ontario, Canada.

The underdog Edmonton Eskimos won a contest over the Montreal Alouettes 26–25. The game, replete with record performances and a touch of controversy, is considered one of the finest Grey Cup games ever.

== Box score ==
First quarter

Edmonton – TD – Earl Lindley 4-yard pass from Rollie Miles (Bob Dean convert) 9:50
Montreal – TD – Red O'Quinn 90-yard pass from Sam Etcheverry (Ray Poole convert)
Edmonton – TD – Bernie Faloney 1-yard run (convert no good) 1:00

Second quarter

Edmonton – FG – Bob Dean 37 yards
Montreal – TD – Red O'Quinn 14-yard pass from Sam Etcheverry (Ray Poole convert)
Montreal – TD – Chuck Hunsinger 8-yard run (Ray Poole convert)

Third quarter

Montreal – Rouge – Ray Poole 17-yard missed FG

Fourth quarter

Montreal – TD – Joey Pal 13-yard pass from Sam Etcheverry (Ray Poole convert)
Edmonton – TD – Glenn Lippman 14-yard run (Bob Dean convert)
Edmonton – TD – Jackie Parker 90-yard fumble return (Bob Dean convert)

Team	1 Q	2 Q	3 Q	4 Q	Final
Edmonton Eskimos	11	3	0	12	26
Montreal Alouettes	6	12	1	6	25

== Background ==
The game is considered to be one of the key contests that ushered in the modern era of professional Canadian football, a process that culminated in the establishment of the Canadian Football League in 1958. At the time, the Interprovincial Rugby Football Union (IRFU) in Central Canada (i.e. Ontario and Quebec) a.k.a. the "Big Four" was considered the pre-eminent football competition in Canada, particularly by Canadians outside Western Canada. In contrast, the Western Interprovincial Football Union (WIFU) was regarded as being inferior to the IRFU, although it was clear by this time that the WIFU outclassed amateur leagues such as the Ontario Rugby Football Union (ORFU).

Nevertheless, radio and television presenters of the era, who were largely based in Central Canada, did not hesitate to plainly express a pro-Eastern bias on the air. The Eskimos were obliged to play the champions of the ORFU for the right to face the Alouettes in the championship game. The Eskimos won easily, defeating the Kitchener-Waterloo Dutchmen by a score of 38–6, in what would turn out to be the last Grey Cup Semi-Final of this sort that would ever be played.

Edmonton beat the Winnipeg Blue Bombers 2-games-to-1 in the WIFU final series before trouncing Kitchener-Waterloo in the Grey Cup Semi-Final. Led by a future Hall of Fame backfield that included quarterback Bernie Faloney, Jackie Parker, Normie Kwong and Rollie Miles, both Parker and Miles could throw on the option as effectively as their nominal quarterback.

The Montreal Alouettes were led by their record-breaking quarterback Sam Etcheverry, who teamed with receiver Johnny "Red" O'Quinn to form one of Canadian football's legendary pass-and-catch tandems. When combined with an all-star lineup, including Alex Webster, Hal Patterson, Joey Pal, Tex Coulter, and Herb Trawick, the Als won 11 games against 3 losses, and swept the Hamilton Tiger Cats in both playoff games.

Due to the heavy pro-Eastern bias, the Eskimos entered the game as clear underdogs with one television announcer speculating that the betting odds were 5-to-1 against them.

== Game summary ==
Edmonton opened with a field-long drive that ended with a Miles-to-Earl Lindley passing touchdown. Miles, Faloney and Parker all took turns passing the ball, with the backs regularly utilizing the option. Normie Kwong took responsibility for the north–south running game.

The Alouettes responded quickly with a 90-yard pass-and-run touchdown. Etcheverry threw his "jump" pass, which was literally a pass thrown at the top of a leap taken right after the snap and right behind the centre. His quick release allowed him to hit a streaking O'Quinn about 10 to 15 yards into the secondary, and being on the fly, it caught the Eskimos flat-footed. Jackie Parker actually caught O'Quinn at the three-yard line, but Red managed to slide to a touchdown. Under today's rules he would have been considered tackled.

The Eskimos engineered another drive, which led to a Faloney one-yard touchdown plunge. This was aided by a pass interference call, in a game where there were few penalties called. Faloney took a high snap on the convert and could not run it in.

In the second quarter, after an Eskimos field goal from Bob Dean, the Larks produced two touchdowns. The first drive ended with yet another O'Quinn reception. The second came from former NFL first-round draft choice Chuck Hunsinger, on an eight-yard run.

In the third quarter the Als could muster only a single rouge on a missed field goal.

Into the fourth quarter Joey Pal caught an Etcheverry pass to put the Als up 25 to 14.

The Eskimos' next drive ended with a Glenn Lippman reverse field dash for a touchdown.

With first-and-ten on the Eskimos' 10-yard line and three minutes remaining, Etcheverry handed the ball off to Hunsinger, who was almost immediately corralled about 5 yards behind the line of scrimmage. In the game's most famous and controversial play he apparently fumbled and Parker snagged the ball on the 20-yard line, in full flight. Etcheverry had no chance to catch him, and he ran 90 yards for the touchdown. With Dean's convert, the score was 26 to 25.

There were still three minutes left in the game, and Etcheverry quickly moved his team downfield. Etcheverry passed to Red O'Quinn at the Eskimos 35-yard line and he quickly spun to face downfield. He was hit and the ball fell to the ground, to be recovered by the Eskimos, who held on to win.

== Controversy ==
The biggest play of the game, and perhaps Grey Cup history, was the Chuck Hunsinger fumble. Many Montreal fans believe that the "fumble" was actually a forward pass attempt (to an ineligible receiver), in which case it would not have been a touchdown for Edmonton as the pass would have been incomplete.

== Trivia ==
There are several Grey Cup records from this game that still stand today. Jackie Parker's 90-yard fumble recovery stood as the longest ever until surpassed in 2017. Red O'Quinn's 13 receptions for 316 yards has not been equalled. Montreal's 656 yards total offence is still the best team performance.

This was the first Grey Cup game to be broadcast on television, by the CBC. Unlike most sporting events of this era, the game film survives today almost in its entirely.

The cold and increasing muddy field conditions contributed to the many fumbles and interceptions that occurred.

This was the first of 11 Grey Cup clashes between Edmonton and Montreal. The Eskimos have won in 1954, 1955, 1956, 1975, 1978, 1979, 2003 and 2005. The Larks have prevailed in 1974, the Ice Bowl of 1977, and 2002.

The Eskimos-versus-Alouettes rivalry is one of the most enduring in modern Canadian professional sports.

A film of the game was the first program broadcast on CFQC-TV in Saskatoon when it first went on the air on December 5, 1954.
