= Jackie Parker =

American gridiron football player and coach (1932–2006)

- Parker holding the Grey Cup following the 1954 championship game

No. 91
- Positions: Quarterback, running back, defensive back, kicker

Personal information
- Born: January 1, 1932; Knoxville, Tennessee, U.S.
- Died: November 7, 2006 (aged 74); Edmonton, Alberta, Canada
- Listed height: 6 ft 1 in (1.85 m)
- Listed weight: 190 lb (86 kg)

Career information
- College: Jones County Junior College; Mississippi State
- NFL draft: 1953: 27th round, 325th overall pick

Career history
- 1954–1962: Edmonton Eskimos
- 1963–1965: Toronto Argonauts
- 1968: BC Lions

Awards and highlights
- 3× Grey Cup champion (1954, 1955, 1956); 3× Schenley Award (1957, 1958, 1960); 7× Jeff Nicklin Memorial Trophy (1954, 1956–1961); 2× Dave Dryburgh Memorial Trophy (1959, 1961); First-team All-American (1953); 2× SEC Player of the Year (1952, 1953); 2× First-team All-SEC (1952, 1953); Edmonton Eskimos Wall of Honour (1983); Mississippi State University Sports Hall of Fame (1972); Mississippi Sports Hall of Fame (1972); National Junior College Athletic Association Hall of Fame (1995); Jones County Junior College Hall of Fame (2013); Eskimos record: Most rushing yards, quarterback – career (4,713); Mississippi State records: Most points scored by a non-kicker in a single season (120); Most total points responsible for in a single season with (168); Highest career yards per pass attempt (8.518); Most rushing touchdowns in a single (modern) (4); Most points scored in a single (modern) game (29); Most points responsible for in a single game (42); Most touchdowns responsible for rushing and passing (6)
- Canadian Football Hall of Fame (Class of 1971)
- College Football Hall of Fame

John Dickerson "Jackie" Parker (January 1, 1932 – November 7, 2006) was an American gridiron football player and coach. He was an All-American in college football and professional football player in the Canadian Football League (CFL), playing the running back, quarterback, defensive back, and kicker positions. He is primarily known for his play with the Edmonton Eskimos. Later in his career, he played for the Toronto Argonauts and the BC Lions and coached the Eskimos and Lions after his playing career ended.

Parker was named a member of the College Football Hall of Fame in 1976, and the Canadian Football Hall of Fame in 1976. In November 2006, Parker was voted third in the CFL's Top 50 players of the league's modern era by Canadian sports network TSN.

== Early life ==
Parker was born on January 1, 1932, in Knoxville, Tennessee and given the name John Dickerson Flanagan. When his mother remarried, he took on the last name of her new husband, Carroll Parker. He suffered through two childhood health scares. The first was when he almost died of a ruptured appendix, and the second was when he suffered a flesh-eating disease that almost cost him his entire leg. Doctors wanted to amputate but Parker's mother would not allow it. Parker attended Young City High School in Knoxville, and despite playing only one year of football he was named an All-City tailback. While attending high school he met and married Peggy Jo, with whom he had three children, Jackie Jr., Peggy Mae and Jerri-Jo.

== College career ==
=== Jones County Junior College ===
When he first graduated from high school Parker found that his college playing choices were limited because he was married, so he elected to play his first two years of college sports for Jones County Junior College in Ellisville, Mississippi, from 1950 to 1951. In 1951, he led the Bobcat football team to a 9–0–1 record and a state title. He was also a standout baseball player helping JCJC to a South Division title and state runner-up finish in 1951 and a state championship in 1952. He was eventually inducted into both the JCJC Sports Hall of Fame and the National Junior College Athletic Association Hall of Fame. He then transferred to Mississippi State University where he spent two seasons as a member of the Bulldogs.

=== Mississippi State ===
When Parker first got to Mississippi State he once again found that his married status was a limiting factor as head football coach Murray Warmath had a policy against married players. Mississippi State baseball coach, R.P. "Doc" Patty had no such policy so Parker got a baseball scholarship and joined the team, where he was an outstanding shortstop and received an offer to play for the Cincinnati Reds. In 1952 the football coaches were in dire need of someone to run their new split-T offense and gave Parker a chance. Early on coaches were not impressed with Parker, but then in the final scrimmage before the opening game he tossed seven touchdowns.

Nicknamed "The Fast Freight from Mississippi State", he was named to the 1952 and 1953 All–Southeastern Conference teams and the 1953 College Football All-America Team. In 1952, he led all NCAA Division I players in points scored, with 120. Parker's 120 points were an SEC record that stood until 1992, when it was broken by Georgia running back Garrison Hearst. Parker won numerous other honors during his college career including being named the Nashville Banner SEC MVP in 1952 and 53, the Birmingham QB Club MVP in 1953 (an award he shared with teammate Hal Easterwood, who was a lineman), and being named the Atlanta Touchdown Club Back of the Year in 1953.

Parker rewrote the record books at MSU and still holds several school records.

- Most points scored by a non-kicker in a single season with 120 in 1952 (tied by Vick Ballard in 2010).
- Most total points responsible for in a single season with 168 in 1952.
- Highest career yards per pass attempt at 8.518.
- Most rushing touchdowns in a single (modern) game with 4 vs Arkansas State in 1952 (record shared with 4 others).
- Most points scored in a single (modern) game with 29 vs Arkansas State in 1952.
- Most points responsible for in a single game with 6 touchdowns & 6 PATs vs Auburn in 1952.

In addition to the records he currently holds, Parker set several records that have since been broken and remain on the top ten list in several categories at MSU.

- 2nd most touchdowns responsible for rushing and passing in a single game with 6 vs Auburn in 1952 (broken by Dak Prescott in 2015).
- 2nd in single season rushing touchdowns with 16 in 1952 behind Vick Ballard with 19 in 2010.
- 3rd in career passing efficiency at 135.11 behind Tyler Russell's 137.3. and Dak Prescott's 146.0
- 3rd in single-season total touchdowns responsible for rushing and passing with 24 in 1953 behind Prescott's 41 in 2014 and Russell's 26 in 2012.
- Tied with J. J. Johnson and John Bond for 5th in career rushing touchdowns with 24 behind Michael Davis, Vick Ballard, Dak Prescott, and Anthony Dixon.
- 7th on the all-time scoring list.
- 10th in single-season total touchdowns responsible for rushing and passing with 15 in 1952

On top of his exploits as the Bulldog QB, Parker was also the team's leading punt returner in 1953, the leading kick returner in 1952 and 1953, and led the team in passes intercepted in 1953 with 4.

To go along with his athletic awards, he was named to the 1953 Cosida All-Academic team. In 1976, he was inducted into the College Football Hall of Fame.

== Professional playing career ==
Once his college playing days were over Parker was drafted by both the New York Giants of the NFL and the Edmonton Eskimos of the Western Interprovincial Football Union (which became part of the Canadian Football League in 1958). Despite being offered more money by the Giants, Parker chose to sign with the Eskimos in part because his former quarterbacks coach at Mississippi State, Darrell Royal, had become the Eskimos' head coach. Royal never actually coached Parker in Canada as he returned to Mississippi State as the head coach for the 1954 season. At the end of his first season Giants owner Wellington Mara personally came calling with a contract worth almost twice what Parker was making with the Eskimos but Parker chose not to go to New York in part because Peggy said she liked Edmonton better.

Nicknamed "Ol' Spaghetti Legs", Parker became one of the most important parts of the Eskimos dynasty of the mid-1950s. While Parker played both defence and offence, a not uncommon practice in his day, his main strength was offence, where he was both a strong runner and an excellent quarterback. This is shown by his Western All-Star selections; as a running back in 1954, 1957, and 1959, and as a quarterback in 1955, 1956, 1958, 1960, and 1961. Parker won six consecutive Jeff Nicklin Memorial Trophies as the West's most outstanding player from 1956 to 1961, and seven in total. He was awarded the Schenley Award as Canadian football's most outstanding player in 1957, 1958, and 1960 and was the runner-up in 1956 and 1961.

During the first three seasons of his career (1954–1956), the Eskimos won consecutive Grey Cups. In the 1954 Grey Cup, Parker made one of the most famous plays in Grey Cup history when, in the fourth quarter, Ted Tully hit Montreal Alouettes running back Chuck Hunsinger forcing a fumble. Parker recovered the ball and returned it 90 yards for a touchdown, giving the Eskimos, who were a large underdog in the game, a surprise victory. Parker's 90-yard fumble return remained a Grey Cup record until Cassius Vaughn's 109-yard fumble return in the 105th Grey Cup.

Following the 1962 season, the Eskimos traded Parker to the Toronto Argonauts for five players and $15,000. Parker played in Toronto from 1963 to 1965.

Parker finished his playing career with the BC Lions in 1968 when, as an assistant coach, he helped the team out of a difficult mid-season situation by donning the pads for one last go-round as quarterback. At the time of his retirement, Parker, who also kicked extra points and field goals, had scored a then-CFL-record 750 points.

== Career statistics ==
		Passing							Rushing				
Year	Team	Games	Att	Comp	Pct	Yards	TD	Int	Att	Yards	Avg	Long	TD
1954	Edmonton		55	36	65.4	558	2	3	117	925	7.9	57	10
1955	Edmonton		128	48	40.0	775	6	6	62	373	6.0	26	7
1956	Edmonton		226	117	51.7	1889	11	16	92	583	6.3	39	10
1957	Edmonton		135	70	51.8	1,150	3	11	102	717	7.0	42	11
1958	Edmonton		241	124	51.4	1,908	8	16	91	405	4.5	26	8
1959	Edmonton		143	80	55.9	1,207	8	9	43	227	5.2	26	4
1960	Edmonton		179	82	51.3	1,613	6	10	109	668	6.1	29	8
1961	Edmonton		184	92	50.0	1,405	11	13	87	644	7.4	49	3
1962	Edmonton		201	110	54.7	1,532	15	9	38	171	4.5	18	3
1963	Toronto	14	219	115	52.5	1,603	7	7	39	143	3.9	22	0
1964	Toronto	13	233	137	58.8	1,841	18	15	33	197	6.0	30	2
1965	Toronto	11	34	14	41.2	169	1	3	12	88	7.3	20	0
1968	BC	8	91	54	59.3	726	0	5	29	67	2.3	11	1
Totals			2,061	1,089	52.8	16,476	88	123	854	5,210	6.1	57	67

Statistics			Receiving					Punting				Interceptions					Field goals & converts					
Year	Team	GP	Rec	Yards	Y/R	Lg	TD	Punts	Yds	Ave.	S	Int	Yds	Ave	Lg	TD	FGA	FGM	Avg	S	XPA	XPM
1954	Edmonton		9	115	12.8	27	3	49	2013	41.1	2	4	32	8.0	15	0	0	0	0	0	0	0
1955	Edmonton		0	0	0	0	0	17	673	39.6	0	0	0	0	0	0	0	0	0	0	0	0
1956	Edmonton		2	21	10.5	12	0	86	3575	41.6	6	0	0	0	0	0	0	0	0	0	0	0
1957	Edmonton		27	559	20.7	81	5	4	212	53.0	1	1	23	23.0	23	0	0	0	0	0	0	0
1958	Edmonton		3	47	15.7	28	0	51	1963	38.5	3	1	0	0.0	0	0	6	4	66.7	0	8	5
1959	Edmonton		20	324	16.2	63	3	1	4	45.0	0	2	25	12.5	23	0	15	12	80.0	0	38	31
1960	Edmonton		10	216	21.6	50	2	2	94	47.0	0	0	0	0	0	0	17	9	52.9	3	31	17
1961	Edmonton		23	383	16.7	48	1	4	215	53.8	0	0	0	0	0	0	21	14	66.7	4	39	34
1962	Edmonton		9	150	16.7	45	0	1	54	54.0	0	0	0	0	0	0	0	0	0	0	0	0
1963	Toronto	14	23	327	14.2	36	2	0	0	0	0	0	0	0	0	0	0	0	0	0	0	0
1964	Toronto	13	9	166	18.4	33	3	0	0	0	0	0	0	0	0	0	0	0	0	0	0	0
1965	Toronto	11	0	0	0	0	0	0	0	0	0	4	55	13.8	32	0	3	1	33.3	0	16	16
1968	BC	8	0	0	0	0	0	0	0	0	0	0	0	0	0	0	0	0	0	0	0	0
Total			135	2308	17.1	81	19	215	8844	41.1	12	12	135	11.2	32	0	62	40	64.5	7	132	103

== Coaching and post-football career ==
After his playing days ended, Parker moved into coaching. Parker coached the BC Lions for part of the 1969 season and all of 1970, before moving on to the front office as general manager the next year. He stayed as general manager until being fired in 1975.

Parker coached the Eskimos from 1983, taking over at mid-season after a 4–4 start led to the firing of Pete Kettela. When Parker resigned for health reasons two games into the 1987 season, he was replaced by Joe Faragalli; the team went on to win the Grey Cup that season after having lost to Hamilton the previous year.

After leaving football, Parker was an executive with the Interprovincial Steel & Pipe Corporation.

On November 7, 2006, at age 74, Parker died in hospital in Edmonton from throat cancer.

== Parker's awards and honours ==
Parker's jersey No. 91 currently hangs on the Wall of Honour at the Eskimos' Commonwealth Stadium. Jackie Parker Park, in Edmonton, Alberta, was named in his honour. The Jackie Parker Trophy, awarded annually to the Most Outstanding Rookie in the West Division, is named after him.

Jackie Parker was inducted into the Canadian Football Hall of Fame in 1971, the Mississippi State University Sports Hall of Fame and the Mississippi Sports Hall of Fame in 1972, the College Football Hall of Fame in 1976, and Canada's Sports Hall of Fame in 1987. In November 2006, Parker was voted as #3 on a list of the CFL's top 50 players since 1945, in a poll conducted by Canadian sports network TSN.

- Grey Cup victories – 1954, 1955, 1956
- CFL's Most Outstanding Player Award – 1957, 1958, 1960
- WIFU or CFL All-Star – 1954, 1955, 1956, 1957, 1958, 1959, 1960, 1961
- Jeff Nicklin Memorial Trophy (West Division's most outstanding player) – 1954, 1956, 1957, 1958, 1959, 1960, 1961
- Dave Dryburgh Memorial Trophy (top scorer in West Division) – 1959, 1961
- Canadian Football Hall of Fame – 1971
- Edmonton Eskimo Wall of Honour – 1983
- Canada's Sports Hall of Fame – 1987
- All Southeastern Conference – 1952, 1953
- College Football All-America Team – 1959
- Nashville Banner SEC MVP – 1952, 1953
- Birmingham QB Club MVP – 1953
- Atlanta Touchdown Club Back of the Year – 1953
- Mississippi State University Sports Hall of Fame – 1972
- Mississippi Sports Hall of Fame – 1972
- College Football Hall of Fame – 1976
- Jones County Junior College Sports Hall of Fame – 2013
- National Junior College Athletic Association Hall of Fame - 1995

== See also ==
- List of NCAA major college football yearly scoring leaders
