= Hal Patterson =

American player of Canadian football (1932–2011)

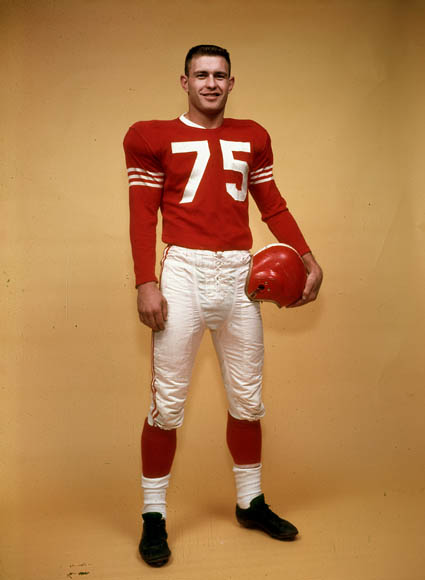
- "Prince" Hal Patterson in a Montreal Alouettes uniform (c. 1958)

No. 75
- Positions: Wide receiver, Defensive back

Personal information
- Born: October 4, 1932; Garden City, Kansas, U.S.
- Died: November 21, 2011 (aged 79); Kinsley, Kansas, U.S.
- Listed height: 6 ft 2 in (1.88 m)
- Listed weight: 190 lb (86 kg)

Career information
- College: Kansas
- NFL draft: 1954: 14th round, 165th overall pick

Career history
- 1954–1960: Montreal Alouettes
- 1961–1967: Hamilton Tiger-Cats

Awards and highlights
- 3× Grey Cup champion (1963, 1965, 1967); CFL's Most Outstanding Player Award (1956); 3× CFL All-Star (1962, 1963, 1964); 11× CFL East All-Star (1954–1958, 1960, 1962–1966)
- Canadian Football Hall of Fame (Class of 1971)

Harold Edward Patterson (October 4, 1932 – November 21, 2011), nicknamed "Prince" Hal, was an American star college basketball player at the University of Kansas, and a professional Canadian football player with the Canadian Football League Montreal Alouettes and Hamilton Tiger-Cats. Patterson is a member of the Canadian Football Hall of Fame, and in 2006, was voted one of the CFL's Top 50 players (#13) of the league's modern era by Canadian sports network TSN.

== Early life and college ==
Born in Garden City, Kansas in 1932, Patterson was a football, baseball and basketball star at the University of Kansas. He was the second-leading rebounder for Kansas' 1953 national runner-up team that lost the NCAA Men's Division I Basketball Championship game by a single point to Indiana University. An end with the Jayhawks football team, he also lettered in baseball.

== Canadian football career ==
Drafted by the Philadelphia Eagles of the National Football League in the 14th round of the 1954 NFL draft, Patterson opted to sign with the Montreal Alouettes of the Interprovincial Rugby Football Union in 1954. (The IRFU became part of the CFL in 1958.)

=== 1956 season ===
Known as "Prince" Hal, in 1956, he won the Jeff Russel Memorial Trophy then the Schenley Award as the Canadian Rugby Union's Outstanding Player as an offensive end. That same year, Patterson set a record that has yet to be matched, when he caught passes for 338 yards in a single game and set the record of 88 catches that stood up for 11 years before Terry Evanshen broke it in 1967. He also set records with 1914 receiving yards, 2039 scrimmage yards (he was the first player to reach 2000 scrimmage yards) and 2858 all purpose yards. His receiving yards record stood until 1983 when Terry Greer beat his record with 2003 yards. His all purpose yards record stood until 1984 when Rufus Crawford beat his record with 2896 yards.

Patterson was a member of the Alouettes until being part of a controversial trade in 1960 that sent him to the last-place Hamilton Tiger-Cats with fellow Montreal star quarterback Sam Etcheverry. Patterson's impact was immediate, as he helped to lead the Tiger-Cats to the 1961 Grey Cup, where the Ti-Cats lost in overtime to the Winnipeg Blue Bombers.

Hal Patterson still holds the record of 580 yards for most pass-receiving yards in Grey Cup history. Patterson scored 54 touchdowns in his 14-year Canadian pro career and had 34 games with at least 100 yards in pass receptions. He was inducted into the Canadian Football Hall of Fame in 1971. In November 2006, Patterson was voted one of the CFL's top 50 players (#13) in a poll conducted by Canadian sports network TSN.

Early in his career, he was a triple threat. Besides being the Most Outstanding Player and two time all-star as a receiver, he returned kickoffs, with 3 going for touchdowns, and played defensive back (being a 5 time all-star). Later he would add 6 all-star selections as a receiver in Hamilton.

== Personal life and death ==
On November 21, 2008, the Montreal Alouettes retired Patterson's number 75. He died on November 21, 2011.
