= Sam Etcheverry =

American gridiron football player (1930–2009)

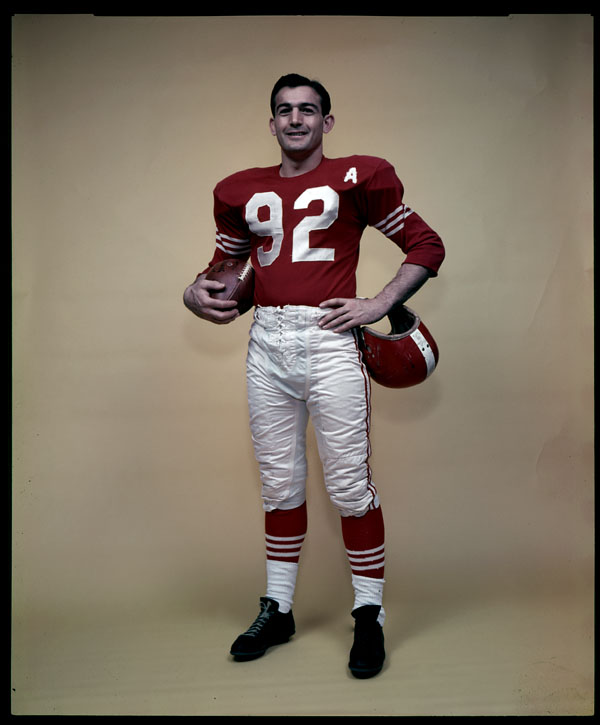
- Etcheverry with the Montreal Alouettes in 1957

No. 92, 14
- Position: Quarterback

Personal information
- Born: May 20, 1930; Carlsbad, New Mexico, U.S.
- Died: August 29, 2009 (aged 79); Montreal, Quebec, Canada
- Listed height: 5 ft 11 in (1.80 m)
- Listed weight: 190 lb (86 kg)

Career information
- College: Denver

Career history

Playing
- Montreal Alouettes (1952–1960); St. Louis Cardinals (1961–1962); San Francisco 49ers (1963)

Coaching
- Montreal Alouettes (1970–1972) Head coach

Awards and highlights
- Grey Cup champion (1970); CFL's Most Outstanding Player Award (1954); 2× Jeff Russel Memorial Trophy (1954, 1958)

Career NFL statistics
- Passing attempts: 302
- Passing completions: 154
- Completion percentage: 51.0%
- TD–INT: 16–21
- Passing yards: 1,982
- Passer rating: 60.6
- Rushing yards: 41
- Stats at Pro Football Reference
- Canadian Football Hall of Fame (Class of 1969)

Samuel Etcheverry (May 20, 1930 – August 29, 2009), nicknamed "the Rifle", was a professional American and Canadian football player and head coach. Etcheverry played the quarterback position, most famously with the Montreal Alouettes of the Canadian Football League, and was named Canadian football's Most Outstanding Player in 1954. Etcheverry's jersey #92 is one of seven retired by the Alouettes.

Etcheverry is a member of the Canadian Football Hall of Fame, and in 2006, was voted one of the CFL's Top 50 players (#26) of the league's modern era by Canadian sports network TSN.

== College career ==
Etcheverry was the son of Basque sheep farmers who emigrated to New Mexico. Known as "the Rifle", Etcheverry played for the University of Denver from 1949 to 1951 where he still holds most of the Pioneers' football records for passing offense.

== Professional career ==
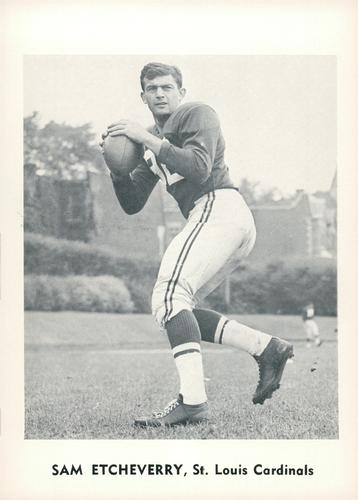
Etcheverry with the St. Louis Cardinals in 1961

In 1952, Etcheverry joined the Montreal Alouettes of the Interprovincial Rugby Football Union (which became part of the Canadian Football League in 1958 and was renamed the Eastern Football Conference in 1960). As his team's quarterback, he was twice voted "Most Outstanding Player" of the eastern union and was named an eastern all-star six times (1953–1957, 1960). In 1954, Etcheverry was awarded the Schenley Award (most outstanding player in the Canadian Rugby Union).

Etcheverry set a single-game passing record of 586 yards in 1954 that stood for 39 years until the 1993 CFL season. He also set a season passing record in 1954 of 3,610 yards that was not only a CFL record but also eclipsed the NFL record set in the 1947 NFL season by Pro Football Hall of Famer Sammy Baugh of the Washington Redskins. He led the CFL in passing from 1954 to 1959. In 1956, he became the first professional quarterback to pass for over 4,000 yards; his record of 4,723 passing yards would stand until 1981 when it was passed by Dieter Brock and Dan Fouts. Etcheverry still holds the record for most passing yards in a Grey Cup game with 508 set in a loss to the Edmonton Eskimos in the 1955 game.

A sports icon in the city of Montreal, when Etcheverry and star receiver Hal Patterson were traded to the last-place Hamilton Tiger-Cats in 1960, it caused an enormous public outcry and led to Etcheverry leaving the Canadian Football League and signing with the St. Louis Cardinals of the National Football League, playing for St. Louis during 1961–62. During 1963 Training Camp, he was demoted to third string by the Cardinals, and asked to be released from his contract. After the Cardinals released him, he signed with the San Francisco 49ers, but was released before the 1963 season started.

== Coaching career ==
Etcheverry returned to Canada in 1964 as the head coach of the Quebec Rifles of the United Football League. The league folded at the end of the season and Etcheverry remained out of coaching until 1967 when he became an assistant at Loyola College in Montreal.

On December 9, 1969, Etcheverry was hired to coach the Alouettes. In his first season, he led the Alouettes to a 3rd-place finish in the Eastern Football Conference with a 7–6–1 record (worst out of the six teams that qualified for the playoffs in the league, which had nine teams at the time that gave three spots to both conferences). They beat Toronto 16–6 to advance to the best-of-2 Eastern Finals against Hamilton. They won 32–22 and 11–4 to advance to the 58th Grey Cup championship game versus the Calgary Stampeders. In a muddy natural grass field (the last for a Grey Cup for over a decade) detested by both teams in Toronto, Montreal prevailed 23–10. The next year, they went 6–8 and missed the playoffs after Ottawa beat them on tiebreakers. They finished 4–10 the next year, but as three teams were guaranteed to make it from the East, Montreal's one game advantage over fourth place Toronto meant a playoff berth. Facing Ottawa in the semifinals, they lost 14–11 to the Rough Riders. He resigned at the end of the 1972 CFL season. His overall record is 14–24–1.

In 1982, he became the general manager and president of the Montreal Concordes. Etcheverry was fired shortly before the start of the 1983 season and head coach Joe Galat replaced him as general manager.

Following the demise of the Concordes, Etcheverry joined a group interested in bringing an NFL franchise to Montreal. He was one of the group's representatives at the 1988 NFL owners meeting.

== Career statistics ==
=== Playing career ===
Year	Team	GP	Passing							Punting				
Year	Team	GP	Att	Com	%	Yds	TD	Int	Lg	#	Yds	Ave.	Lg	S
1952	Montreal Alouettes	12	235	140	59.6	2,084	9	18		-	-	-	-	-
1953	Montreal Alouettes	14	343	166	48.4	2,714	24	32		-	-	-	-	-
1954	Montreal Alouettes	14	372	206	55.4	3,610	25	29	105	3	131	43.7	60	0
1955	Montreal Alouettes	12	400	227	56.8	3,657	30	24	84	19	733	38.6	51	1
1956	Montreal Alouettes	14	446	276	61.9	4,723	32	23	109	48	1,968	41.0	56	3
1957	Montreal Alouettes	14	408	215	52.7	3,341	14	22	88	66	2,634	39.9	55	4
1958	Montreal Alouettes	14	423	247	58.4	3,548	18	25	87	145	5,668	39.1	80	3
1959	Montreal Alouettes	14	402	231	57.5	3,133	10	21	80	131	4,937	37.7	60	6
1960	Montreal Alouettes	14	378	229	60.6	3,571	24	19	98	102	4,196	41.1	61	10
1961	St. Louis Cardinals (NFL)	14	196	96	49.0	1,275	14	11	78	-	-	-	-	x
1962	St. Louis Cardinals (NFL)	14	106	58	54.7	707	2	10	68	59	2,259	38.3	61	x
	CFL totals		3,407	1,937	56.9	30,381	186	213	109	514	20,267	39.4	80	27
	NFL totals		302	154	51.0	1,982	16	21	78	59	2,259	38.3	61	x
	Totals		3,709	2,091	56.4	32,363	202	234	109	573	22,526	39.3	80	27

=== Head coaching record ===
Team	Year	Regular season					Postseason		
Team	Year	Won	Lost	Ties	Points	Finish	Won	Lost	Result
Alouettes	1970	7	6	1	15	3rd	4	0	Won Grey Cup
Alouettes	1971	6	8	0	12	4th	0	0	missed playoffs
Alouettes	1972	4	10	0	8	3rd	0	1	lost Divisional playoff
Totals		17	24	1	35		4	1	1 Grey Cup

== Awards and honours ==
Etcheverry was inducted into the Canadian Football Hall of Fame in 1969 and was an inaugural inductee into the University of Denver Athletics Hall of Fame upon its formation in 1996.

In November, 2006, Etcheverry was chosen 26th amongst the CFL's 50 Greatest Players in a TSN poll.

== Death ==
Etcheverry died of cancer in Montreal on August 29, 2009.
