= Bob Westlake =

Profile
- Position: Fullback

Personal information
- Born: c. 1927
- Died: November 14, 1993 (aged 66); Edmonton, Alberta, Canada
- Listed height: 6 ft 1 in (1.85 m)
- Listed weight: 201 lb (91 kg)

Career history
- 1949: Hamilton Wildcats
- 1950–1951: Toronto Argonauts
- 1952–1953: Calgary Stampeders
- 1955: Montreal Alouettes

Awards and highlights
- Grey Cup champion (1950)

Robert John Westlake (c. 1927 – November 14, 1993) was a Canadian professional football player who played for the Hamilton Wildcats, Toronto Argonauts, Calgary Stampeders and Montreal Alouettes. He won the Grey Cup with the Argonauts in 1950. He played football previously for the University of Toronto and Delta High School in his hometown of Hamilton, Ontario. He died in Edmonton in 1993.
