= Dean Bandiera =

Canadian football player (1926–2020)

Dean "Dino" Bandiera
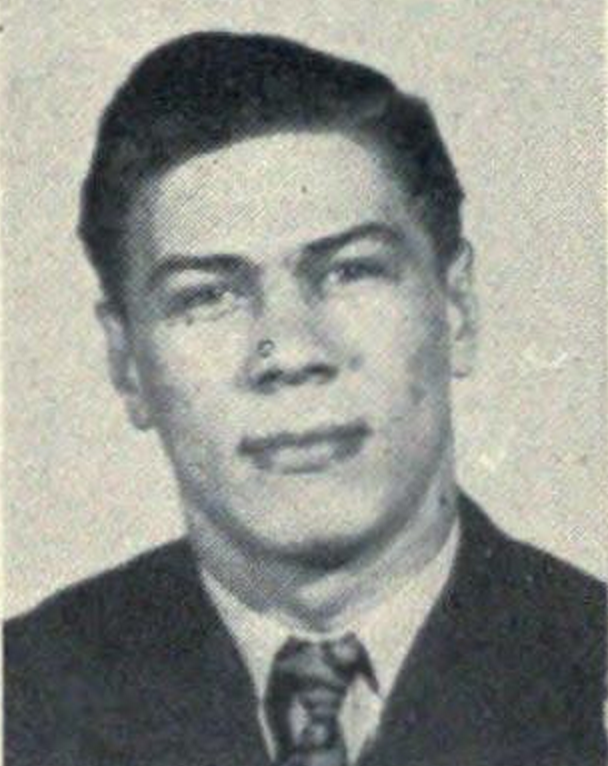
- Bandiera pictured c. 1945 at St. Michael's

Profile
- Positions: Guard, Halfback

Personal information
- Born: January 1, 1926; Timmins, Ontario, Canada
- Died: October 13, 2020 (aged 94); Montreal, Quebec, Canada
- Listed height: 6 ft 0 in (1.83 m)
- Listed weight: 200 lb (91 kg)

Career history
- 1946–1947: Montreal Alouettes
- 1949–1950: Saskatchewan Roughriders
- 1951–1953: Winnipeg Blue Bombers
- 1954–1955: Calgary Stampeders

Awards and highlights
- 2× CFL West All-Star (1952, 1953)

Dean "Dino" Bandiera (1 January 1926 – 13 October 2020) was a Canadian professional football player who played for the Montreal Alouettes, Saskatchewan Roughriders, Winnipeg Blue Bombers and Calgary Stampeders. He was an alumnus of St. Michael's College, Toronto. Bandiera retired from football in 1955 when he was "fired" by the Calgary Stampeders for "football misbehaviour". It was alleged that Bandiera divulged information during a game to the winning opposing team regarding the Stampeders' plays.
