= Dick Brown (Canadian football) =

Canadian football player

Profile
- Position: Guard

Personal information
- Born: May 9, 1926; Cleveland, Ohio
- Died: May 20, 2000 (aged 74); Guelph, Ontario
- Listed height: 5 ft 10 in (1.78 m)
- Listed weight: 170 lb (77 kg)

Career history
- 1950–1954: Hamilton Tiger-Cats
- 1955–1957: Toronto Argonauts
- 1957: Montreal Alouettes

Awards and highlights
- Grey Cup champion (1953)

Dick Brown (May 9, 1926 – May 20, 2000) was a Canadian football player who played for the Hamilton Tiger-Cats, Toronto Argonauts, and Montreal Alouettes. He won the Grey Cup with Hamilton in 1953. He previously played football for the University of Toronto. He later served as director of athletics for the University of Guelph.
