= Tom O'Malley (gridiron football) =

American gridiron football player (1925–2011)

No. 76
- Position: Quarterback

Personal information
- Born: July 23, 1925; Cincinnati, Ohio, U.S.
- Died: June 11, 2011 (aged 85); York, Pennsylvania, U.S.
- Listed height: 5 ft 11 in (1.80 m)
- Listed weight: 185 lb (84 kg)

Career information
- College: Cincinnati

Career history
- Cleveland Browns (1950)*; Green Bay Packers (1950); Erie Vets (1950); Ottawa Rough Riders (1951–1953)
- * Offseason or practice squad member only

Awards and highlights
- Grey Cup champion (1951); NCAA passing yards leader (1949)

Career NFL statistics
- Passing attempts: 15
- Passing completions: 4
- Completion percentage: 26.7%
- TD–INT: 0–6
- Passing yards: 31
- Passer rating: 0
- Stats at Pro Football Reference

Thomas Louis O'Malley (July 23, 1925 – June 11, 2011) was a quarterback in the National Football League (NFL). He was a member of the Green Bay Packers during the 1950 NFL season. He played for the Ottawa Rough Riders of the Canadian Football League (CFL) from 1951 to 1953, leading them to the 39th Grey Cup, winning it 21−14. He played college football at Cincinnati. In his one NFL game he threw six interceptions.

== Early life ==
Tom O'Malley was born on July 23, 1925, in Cincinnati, Ohio. He went to high school at Hughes (OH). After High School, he was in the navy for three years.

== College career ==
O'Malley joined the Cincinnati Bearcats after serving in the navy. His first year of college was in 1946. He was their starting quarterback in all four of his college years. He was drafted in the 6th round (45) of the 1949 AAFC Draft by the Cleveland Browns but continued college. In 1949 with new head coach Sid Gillman, he led the nation in passing yards. He also threw 16 touchdowns. Sid Gillman retired his number (27), but it did not stay retired.

== Professional career ==
In March, he was signed by the Cleveland Browns after they drafted him. However, he was traded on August 28 to the Green Bay Packers for a draft pick.

He was traded to the Green Bay Packers for a draft pick. In week one rookie quarterback Tobin Rote started the game but left in the second quarter due to a shoulder injury. Head coach Gene Ronzani put in O'Malley to replace the injured Rote. He completed 4-of-15 passes for 31 yards (with his longest completion being 20 yards) in a 45–7 loss to the Detroit Lions. He set a single-game Packers record with six interceptions, with one interception being returned by Clarence Self 56 yards for a touchdown. He had one rush for –9 yards and a passer rating of zero. He wore number 76, serving as the only quarterback to wear that number. He became the first (and so far only) quarterback to throw six interceptions in their career debut in NFL history. He was released three days later.

He briefly played for the Erie Vets of the American Football League/American Association. He was the backup quarterback for Butch Songin. With the Vets he completed 22 of 63 attempts for 405 yards, 1 touchdown, and 6 interceptions. The Vets lost the final American Association championship to the Richmond Rebels.

From 1951 to 1953, he was the starting quarterback for the Ottawa Rough Riders. In 1951, he played in 12 games and threw 20 touchdowns. He led the Rough Riders to the 39th Grey Cup, which they won 21–14. He also had one rushing touchdown in 1951. In 1952 he played 12 games and had 19 touchdown passes. In 1953 he played in 14 games and had 22 touchdown passes. He also had one rushing touchdown. 1953 was his final season. He played 38 games for the Rough Riders.

== Later life ==
O'Malley received a variety of honors from Cincinnati in his later years, which included the athletic Hall of Fame, the football Ring of Honor. He died on June 11, 2011, at the age of 85 in York, Pennsylvania; he was survived by his three children and several grandchildren.

== See also ==
- List of college football yearly passing leaders
