= Leo Sweeney =

Canadian football player (died 2018)

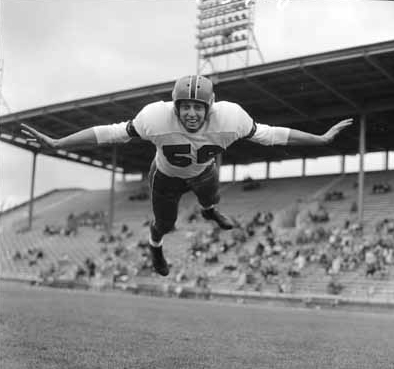
- Sweeney in 1954

No. 58
- Positions: Centre, Guard

Personal information
- Born: c. 1930 (age 95–96)
- Died: June 2018; Newry, Northern Ireland
- Listed height: 6 ft 1 in (1.85 m)
- Listed weight: 190 lb (86 kg)

Career history
- 1953: Calgary Stampeders
- 1954–1955: BC Lions

Leo Sweeney (born 1932) was a Canadian football player who played for the BC Lions and Calgary Stampeders. He played junior football in Vancouver.

Sweeney lived in Newry, Northern Ireland, until his death in June 2018. (Erin Sweeney, his niece).
