= Lindy Berry =

American gridiron football player (1927–2014)

No. 43
- Positions: Quarterback, Kick returner, Punt returner

Personal information
- Born: December 21, 1927; Wichita Falls, Texas, U.S.
- Died: April 19, 2014 (aged 86); Fort Worth, Texas, U.S.

Career information
- High school: Wichita Falls
- College: Texas Christian
- NFL draft: 1950: 7th round, 89th overall pick

Career history
- 1950–1951: Edmonton Eskimos

Awards and highlights
- Jeff Nicklin Memorial Trophy (1950); CFL All-West second team (1950); 2× First-team All-SWC (1948, 1949); Second-team All-SWC (1947)

Lindy Berry (December 21, 1927 – April 19, 2014) was an American professional football quarterback. He played college football for the TCU Horned Frogs at Texas Christian University. Berry was selected in the 1950 NFL draft, and played professional football for two seasons with the Edmonton Eskimos in what later became the Canadian Football League (CFL). In 1950, he received the Jeff Nicklin Memorial Trophy for the CFL West Division's most valuable player.

== Early life ==
Berry attended Wichita Falls High School in Wichita Falls, Texas. While there, he played football under head coach Thurman "Tugboat" Jones. During his junior season in 1944, he led the Coyotes to an 8–3 record and the district championship. Nevertheless, Berry said, "There was this café in town where people went on Saturday mornings to rehash the game from the night before. One morning I heard a couple of guys in there talking about me. One said, 'He will never make it.' I said to myself, 'We'll see.'" As a senior in 1945, Berry led Wichita Falls to an 11–1–1 record. The Coyotes' sole loss was to the eventual state champions, Highland Park High School, which eliminated Wichita Falls in the semifinals.

== College career ==
Berry attended Texas Christian University where he played on the Horned Frogs varsity football team all four seasons. In addition to playing quarterback, he was also TCU's punt and kickoff returner and played safety on defense. His passing duo with end Morris Bailey was nicknamed the "Berry-to-Bailey Battery." Wichita Falls' Times Record News reported an incident that demonstrated Berry was "tough as nails". In one unspecified game against the Texas Longhorns, Berry dropped back in the pocket looking to pass. A Longhorns defender, Errol Fry, dodged a block and sacked Berry. During the tackle, Fry's elbow struck Berry in the face and knocked out two of his front teeth and broke his jaw. Nevertheless, Berry played the following week, while wearing a hockey mask to protect his jaw that had been wired shut.

He earned his first letter as a freshman in 1946. In 1947, he led the team in passing with 429 yards, 31 completions on 67 attempts, and one touchdown. He also led the team in rushing with 379 yards on 112 attempts and four touchdowns. In 1948, Berry recorded 706 passing yards, 61 completions on 134 attempts, and two touchdowns. Midway through the season, he ranked second in the nation in total offensive yards until surpassed by Charlie Justice of North Carolina. Berry finished the season as the team's rushing leader with 783 yards on 190 attempts and four touchdowns. He was named an All-Southwest Conference selection. He also received the Rogers Trophy as the team's most valuable player. In 1949, Berry compiled 1,445 passing yards, 106 completions on 220 attempts, and seven touchdowns. He also threw 23 interceptions, which to date remains the school record. He was named a first-team All-American and an All-Southwest Conference selection. After the season, he participated in the East-West Shrine Game. During that season, he compiled 1,445 passing yards in 10 games. At the time, only one other TCU quarterback had exceeded that in a season, Heisman Trophy winner Davey O'Brien, and he had the benefit of playing in one additional game.

During his college career, Berry had recorded 1,745 rushing yards, 1,372 punt return yards, 729 kickoff return yards, 185 interception return yards, and 32 receiving yards. He graduated from TCU as its all-time career leader in all-purpose yardage, a distinction which stood through the mid-1980s when his mark was surpassed by Tony Jeffery. Berry's 2,101 total kick return yards set a school record that stood until 2005, when it was broken by Cory Rodgers.

== Professional career ==
Berry was selected in the seventh round of the 1950 NFL draft by the San Francisco 49ers as the 89th overall pick. He played two seasons for the Edmonton Eskimos in what later became known as the Canadian Football League (CFL) from 1950 to 1951. He was awarded the Jeff Nicklin Memorial Trophy in 1950 as the West Division's most valuable player. He was named to the CFL's 1950 All-West second team.

== Regular season statistics ==
CFL Statistics			Passing							Rushing				
Year	Team	GP	Att	Com	%	Yds	TD	Int	Lg	#	Yds	Ave.	Lg	TD
1950	Edmonton Eskimos	13	254	129	50.8	2201	10	20	100	55	209	3.8	0	2
1951	Edmonton Eskimos	1	-	-	-	-	-	-	-	-	-	-	-	-

== Personal life ==
In 1951, Berry married Mary, the secretary of his former college coach Dutch Meyer. Their grandson, Charlie Berry, played for Highland Park High School and the SMU Mustangs at Southern Methodist University as a defensive lineman. Since those are both rivals of the elder Berry's alma maters, he said, "It wasn't easy but I had to cheer for Charlie."

Berry was diagnosed with Parkinson's disease in 2004. In 2008, he was inducted into the Oil Bowl Hall of Fame, which honors the most outstanding past participants of a high school football all-star game between Texas and Oklahoma players. That same year, Sports Illustrated listed him among six others as "worthy of consideration" as the best player to have ever worn the number 43.

Berry is the great-uncle of Lana Berry, a popular figure on Twitter and other social media sites, and sports podcaster.

== See also ==
- List of NCAA major college yearly punt and kickoff return leaders
