= Rod Pantages =

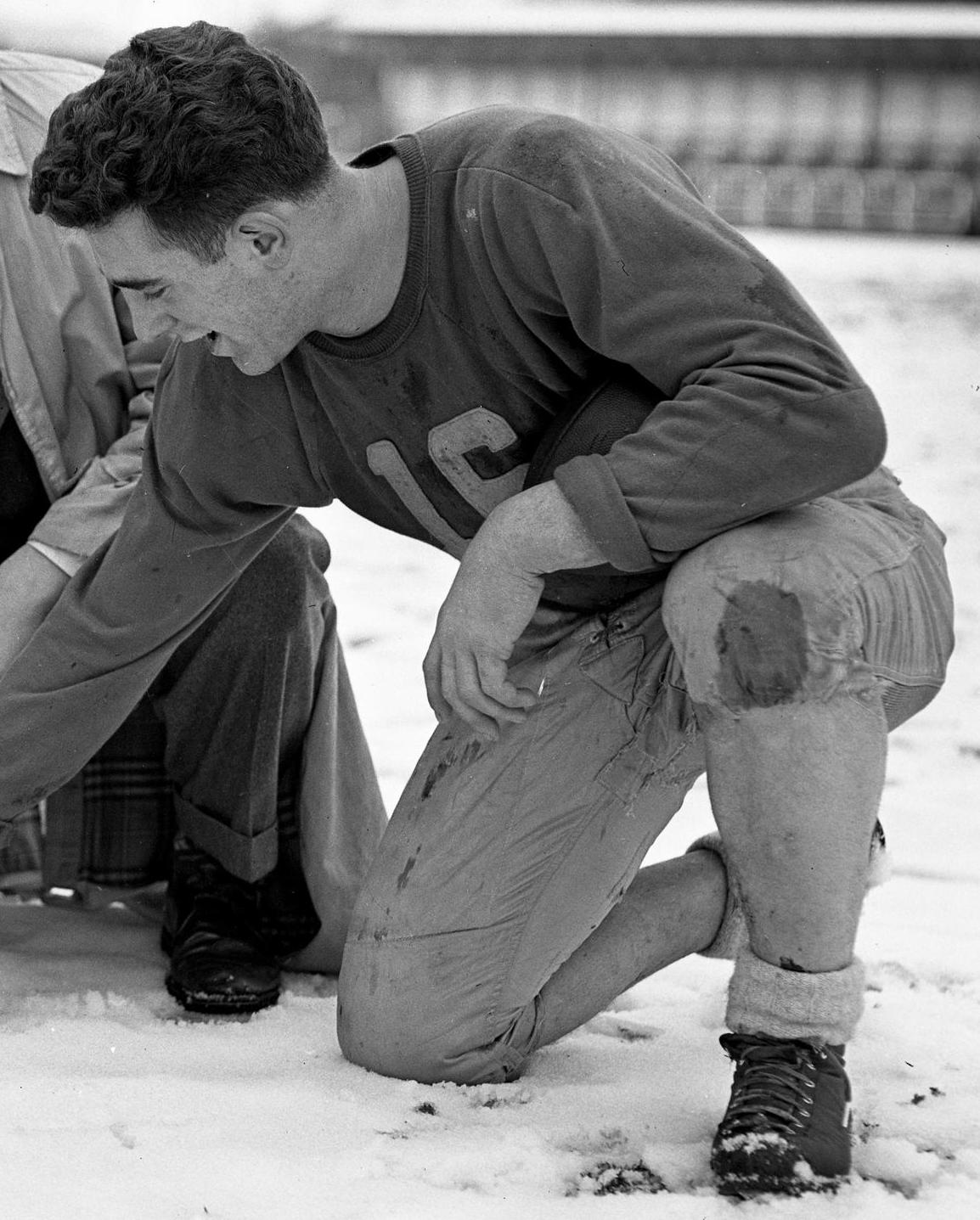
- Pantages in 1948

Profile
- Positions: Halfback, Punters

Personal information
- Born: January 24, 1929; Vancouver, British Columbia, Canada
- Died: July 5, 2012 (aged 83); Vancouver, British Columbia, Canada
- Listed height: 5 ft 11 in (1.80 m)
- Listed weight: 199 lb (90 kg)

Career history
- 1948–1949: Calgary Stampeders
- 1950: Montreal Alouettes
- 1952–1954: Edmonton Eskimos
- 1955–1956: Saskatchewan Roughriders

Awards and highlights
- Grey Cup champion (1948, 1954)

Rodney Lloyd Pantages (January 24, 1929 – July 5, 2012) was a Canadian professional football player who played for the Calgary Stampeders, Montreal Alouettes, Edmonton Eskimos and Saskatchewan Roughriders. He won the Grey Cup with the Stampeders in 1948 and the Eskimos in 1954. He was also a handball player in his later life, winning a national championship.
