= Don Lord =

Canadian football player

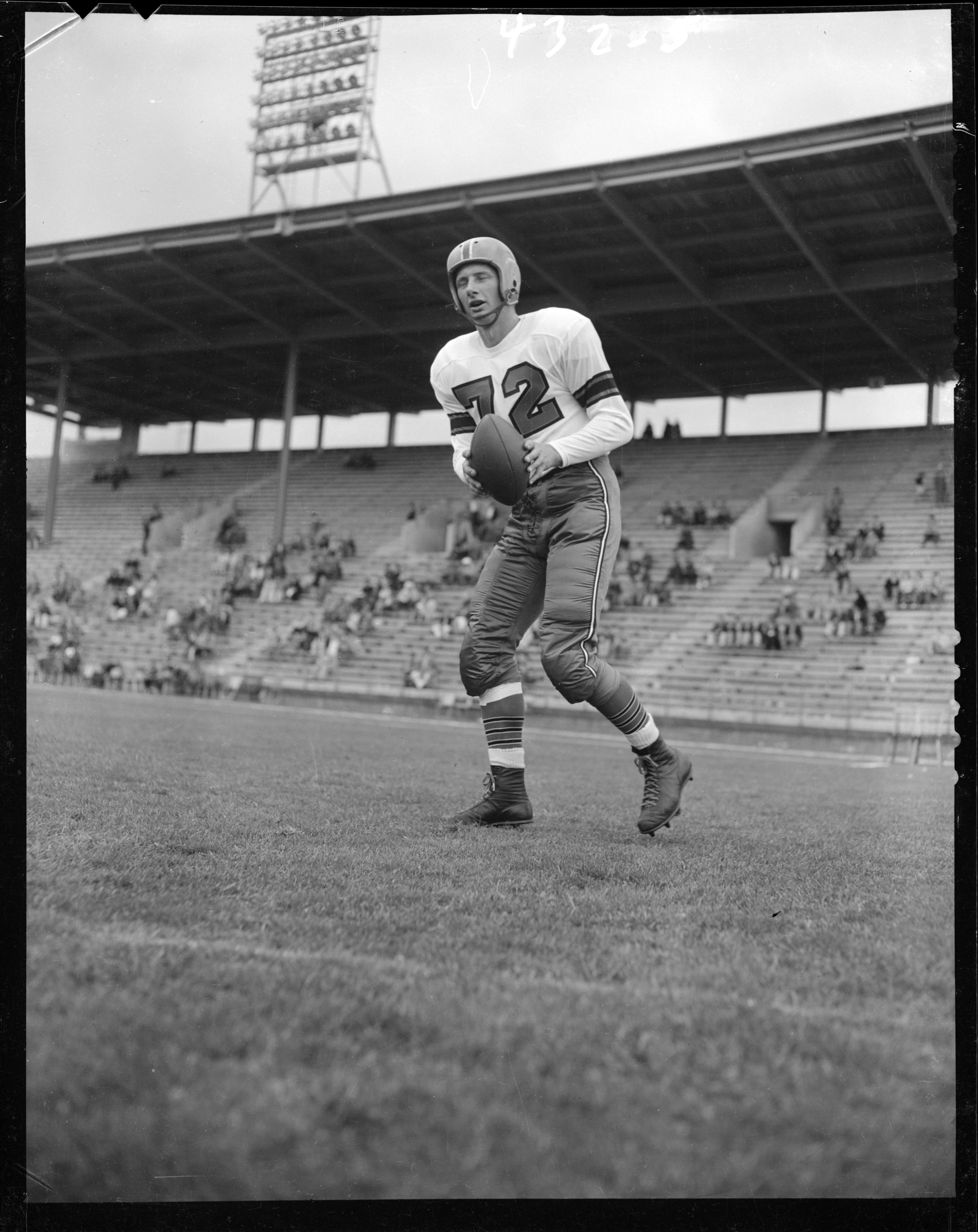
- Lord in 1954

No. 72
- Position: End

Personal information
- Born: October 13, 1928; Vancouver, British Columbia, Canada
- Died: April 27, 2010 (aged 81); Vancouver, British Columbia, Canada
- Listed height: 6 ft 2 in (1.88 m)
- Listed weight: 195 lb (88 kg)

Career information
- University: UBC

Career history
- 1951–1953: Edmonton Eskimos
- 1954–1959: BC Lions

Donald William Lord (October 13, 1928 – April 27, 2010) was a Canadian professional football player who played for the BC Lions and Edmonton Eskimos. He previously played football at the University of British Columbia.
