= Marv Whaley =

American gridiron football player (1924–2007)

Profile
- Position: End

Personal information
- Born: June 25, 1924; Haynesville, Louisiana
- Died: February 20, 2007 (aged 82); Atlanta, Georgia
- Listed height: 6 ft 4 in (1.93 m)
- Listed weight: 205 lb (93 kg)

Career history
- 1950–1951: Toronto Argonauts

Awards and highlights
- Grey Cup champion (1950)

Marvin Earl Whaley (June 25, 1924 – February 20, 2007) was an American professional football player who played for the Toronto Argonauts. He won the Grey Cup with the Argonauts in 1950. He played college football for Morgan State University. He died in 2007.
