= Don Mattingly (Canadian football) =

Canadian football player (born 1931)

Profile
- Position: Tackle

Personal information
- Born: c. 1931
- Listed height: 6 ft 1 in (1.85 m)
- Listed weight: 280 lb (127 kg)

Career history
- 1950–1952: Winnipeg Blue Bombers

Don Mattingly (born c. 1931) was a Canadian football player who played for the Winnipeg Blue Bombers. He is the brother of Bruce Mattingly and Ray Mattingly.
