= Bob Hayton =

Bob Hayton may refer to:

- Bob Hayton (Canadian football)
- Bob Hayton (Australian footballer)
