= Laurie Hodgson =

Canadian football player (born 1932)

Profile
- Positions: Guard, Tackle

Personal information
- Born: June 26, 1932 (age 94); Edmonton, Alberta, Canada
- Listed height: 6 ft 0 in (1.83 m)
- Listed weight: 210 lb (95 kg)

Career history
- 1952–1955: Edmonton Eskimos
- 1956: BC Lions
- 1958: BC Lions

Awards and highlights
- Grey Cup champion (1954, 1955)

Laurence James Hodgson (born June 26, 1932) is a Canadian football player who played for the Edmonton Eskimos and BC Lions. He won the Grey Cup with the Eskimos in 1954, 1955 and 1956. Hodgson also played ice hockey for the Edmonton Oil Kings of the Western Canada Junior Hockey League in the 1951–1952 season, as a goaltender.
