= 1950 Montreal Alouettes season =

Canadian football team season

- Head coach: Lew Hayman
- Home stadium: Delorimier Stadium

Results
- Record: 6–6
- Division place: 3rd, IRFU
- Playoffs: did not qualify

Uniform

The 1950 Montreal Alouettes was the fifth season for the franchise as they competed in the Interprovincial Rugby Football Union, the highest level of play in eastern Canada. Finishing in third place within the IRFU, the Alouettes failed to make the playoffs despite winning the 37th Grey Cup the previous season.

== Background ==
In 1949, the Montreal Alouettes finished with an 8–4 record. The team became Grey Cup champions by defeating the Calgary Stampeders 28–15.

== Acquisitions ==
The Alouettes signed tackle Jim Ambrose from the Quebec Senior Football League before the start of the regular season.

== Exhibitions ==
Game	Date	Opponent	Results		Venue	Attendance
Game	Date	Opponent	Score	Record	Venue	Attendance
A	Aug 19	at Calgary Stampeders	L 7–19	0–1	Mewata Stadium	14,000
B	Aug 21	at Edmonton Eskimos	L 6–11	0–2	Clarke Stadium	10,500
C	Sept 28	vs. McGill University Redmen	W 19–6	1–2	Delorimier Stadium	10,403

== Regular season ==
By late August, head coach Lew Hayman publicly stated that the Alouettes were performing more poorly than they had the previous season. The team had failed to find permanent starters for two spots on their roster, a tackle and an end. Hayman hoped to fill those roster spots with American players, but he also pointed to a "lack of drive" from the team to explain their two preseason losses. He predicted that the team would struggle for "a third of the schedule" before improving. This prediction proved accurate. After the Alouettes won their season opener against Ottawa Rough Riders, they lost their next four games to fall to a 1–4 record. Their poor performance was partially blamed on injuries, a situation which worsened when former all-star halfback John Harper suffered a dislocated shoulder in a late September exhibition game against the McGill Redmen. The Alouettes improved in October, winning four of their next five games to reach an even 5–5 record. They remained a possible playoff team through the final week, when a win by the Hamilton Tiger-Cats pushed them into third place and prevented them from making the playoffs. The Alouettes finished with a 6–6 record.

=== Season standings ===
Interprovincial Rugby Football Union
Team	GP	W	L	T	PF	PA	Pts
Hamilton Tiger-Cats	12	7	5	0	231	217	14
Toronto Argonauts	12	6	5	1	291	187	13
Montreal Alouettes	12	6	6	0	192	261	12
Ottawa Rough Riders	12	4	7	1	182	231	9

=== Season schedule ===
Week	Game	Date	Opponent	Results		Venue	Attendance
Week	Game	Date	Opponent	Score	Record	Venue	Attendance
1	1	Aug 27	vs. Ottawa Rough Riders	W 14–7	1–0	Delorimier Stadium	18,000
2	2	Sept 2	at Toronto Argonauts	L 6–26	1–1	Varsity Stadium	16,000
3	3	Sept 9	at Toronto Argonauts	L 12–43	1–2	Varsity Stadium	18,000
4	4	Sept 16	at Ottawa Rough Riders	L 15–42	1–3	Lansdowne Park	15,000
5	5	Sept 23	at Hamilton Tiger-Cats	L 12–18	1–4	Civic Stadium	7,000
6	6	Oct 1	vs. Hamilton Tiger-Cats	W 31–18	2–4	Delorimier Stadium	15,000
7	7	Oct 7	at Ottawa Rough Riders	L 8–18	2–5	Lansdowne Park	13,000
7	8	Oct 8	vs. Ottawa Rough Riders	18–14	3–5	Delorimier Stadium	18,894
8	9	Oct 14	vs. Toronto Argonauts	W 24–16	4–5	Delorimier Stadium	13,424
9	10	Oct 22	vs. Hamilton Tiger-Cats	W 16–13	5–5	Delorimier Stadium	16,687
10	11	Oct 28	at Hamilton Tiger-Cats	L 18–29	5–6	Civic Stadium	12,000
11	12	Nov 4	at Toronto Argonauts	W 18–17	6–6	Varsity Stadium	11,000
