= Pete Gosich =

Canadian football player

Profile
- Position: Guard

Personal information
- Born: 1920s
- Died: 1981
- Listed height: 6 ft 0 in (1.83 m)
- Listed weight: 225 lb (102 kg)

Career history
- 1951: Ottawa Rough Riders
- 1952: Edmonton Eskimos

Peter Gosich (c. 1920s–1981) was a Canadian football player who played for the Edmonton Eskimos and Ottawa Rough Riders. He played college football at San Jose State University. He died in 1981.
