= Gerry DeLeeuw =

Canadian football player

Profile
- Positions: Guard, Tackle

Personal information
- Born: April 21, 1926; St. Vital, Manitoba
- Died: December 2, 2014 (aged 88); Winnipeg, Manitoba
- Listed height: 5 ft 11 in (1.80 m)
- Listed weight: 210 lb (95 kg)

Career history
- 1947–1952: Winnipeg Blue Bombers

Awards and highlights
- 2× CFL West All-Star (1950, 1951)

Gerrard DeLeeuw (April 21, 1926 - December 2, 2014) was a Canadian professional football player who played for the Winnipeg Blue Bombers. He was from St. Vital, Manitoba, where he also played junior football.
