= Al Bodine =

Canadian football player (1927–2020)

Profile
- Position: Halfback

Personal information
- Born: October 30, 1927; Youngstown, Ohio, U.S.
- Died: August 31, 2020 (aged 92); Longwood, Florida, U.S.
- Listed height: 5 ft 10 in (1.78 m)
- Listed weight: 200 lb (91 kg)

Career information
- High school: East (Youngstown, Ohio)
- College: Georgia
- NFL draft: 1950: 17th round, 216th overall pick

Career history
- 1950–1951: Saskatchewan Roughriders

Awards and highlights
- CFL West All-Star (1950)

Alvin Addison Bodine (October 30, 1927 – August 31, 2020) was an American professional football player who played for the Saskatchewan Roughriders. He played college football at the University of Georgia.
