= List of Tampa Spartans in the NFL draft =

Tampa Spartans Draft

This is a list of Tampa Spartans football players in the NFL draft.

== Key ==
B	Back	K	Kicker	NT	Nose tackle
C	Center	LB	Linebacker	FB	Fullback
DB	Defensive back	P	Punter	HB	Halfback
DE	Defensive end	QB	Quarterback	WR	Wide receiver
DT	Defensive tackle	RB	Running back	G	Guard
E	End	T	Offensive tackle	TE	Tight end

= Pro Bowler
= Hall of Famer

== Selections ==
Year	Round	Pick	Overall	Player	Team	Position
1951	11	9	132	John Natyshak	Los Angeles Rams	B
1952	15	11	180	Holly Alpin	Cleveland Browns	E
1956	9	4	101	Bob Lovely	Chicago Cardinals	T
1958	13	8	153	Don Herndon	Green Bay Packers	B
1964	17	7	231	Jim Galmin	Los Angeles Rams	E
1969	6	10	140	Mike Coleman	Denver Broncos	RB
1970	5	5	109	Steve Starnes	Buffalo Bills	LB
1970	10	3	237	Dick Nittenger	Miami Dolphins	G
1971	2	6	32	John Mooring	New York Jets	T
1972	10	9	243	Bob Brown	Pittsburgh Steelers	DT
1972	14	24	362	Willie Jones	Miami Dolphins	LB
1973	1	1	1	John Matuszak	Houston Oilers	DE
1973	5	15	119	Leon McQuay	New York Giants	RB
1973	5	23	127	Ron Mikolajczyk	Oakland Raiders	T
1973	12	3	289	Paul Orndorff	New Orleans Saints	RB
1973	16	17	407	Wilbur Grooms	Kansas City Chiefs	LB
1974	7	5	161	Noah Jackson	Baltimore Colts	G
1974	12	13	299	Mark Wakefield	Detroit Lions	WR
1975	1	23	23	Darryl Carlton	Miami Dolphins	OT
1975	2	7	36	Freddie Solomon	Miami Dolphins	WR
1975	6	7	137	Morris LaGrand	Kansas City Chiefs	RB
