= Haddleton =

Haddleton is a surname. Notable people with the surname include:

- Arthur Haddleton (1910–1971), English footballer
- Billy Haddleton (1926–1990), Canadian football player
- David Haddleton (born 1962), British chemist
