= Con Kelly =

Canadian football player

Profile
- Position: Halfback

Personal information
- Born: 1934; Edmonton, Alberta, Canada
- Died: May 17, 1981 (aged 47); Edmonton, Alberta, Canada
- Listed height: 6 ft 2 in (1.88 m)
- Listed weight: 190 lb (86 kg)

Career history
- 1955–1956: Edmonton Eskimos

Awards and highlights
- Grey Cup champion (1955, 1956)

Connell Vincent Kelly (1934 – May 17, 1981) was a Canadian professional football player who played for the Edmonton Eskimos. He won the Grey Cup with the Eskimos in 1955 and 1956. Kelly was raised and played junior football in Edmonton. He died in 1981.
