= Jim Ambrose =

Profile
- Position: T

Personal information
- Born: c. 1930
- Died: September 10, 1953 (aged 22–23); Ottawa, Ontario
- Listed height: 6 ft 2 in (1.88 m)
- Listed weight: 232 lb (105 kg)

Career information
- High school: West Hill HS
- Jrs.: NDG Maple Leafs

Career history
- 1950–1952: Montreal Alouettes

Jim Ambrose (c. 1930 – September 10, 1953) was a professional Canadian football tackle. He played in 30 games for the Montreal Alouettes of the Interprovincial Rugby Football Union (IRFU) from 1950 to 1952.

== Early career ==
Ambrose played high school football at West Hill High School before playing for the Notre-Dame-de-Grace Maple Leafs (NDG Maple Leafs) of the Quebec Senior Football League. He played as the modern equivalent of both an offensive tackle and defensive tackle under the one-platoon system. His performance with the Maple Leafs was described as "outstanding" in the Ottawa Journal, resulting in Ambrose's promotion into the Interprovincial Rugby Football Union.

== Professional career ==
Ambrose was signed by the Montreal Alouettes in 1950 after his performance as a junior football player attracted attention. In addition to his role as a tackle, Ambrose occasionally acted as a placekicker for the Alouettes. A forum of quarterbacks named Ambrose the most likely to win the rookie of the year award in November due to his status as "about the only one of the slim rookie crop to see much action". The Alouettes re-signed Ambrose in July 1952.

== Later career and death ==
After the 1952 season, Ambrose joined the Lakeshore Flyers of the Intermediate Quebec Rugby Football Union as a player-coach, coaching the linemen in addition to playing for the team. He collapsed during a game in September and later died. His death initially generated some controversy as a football injury was considered a potential cause of death, but this was ruled out quickly by medical examiners. His death was later attributed to encephalitis (inflammation of the brain) caused by a viral infection.
