= Len Meltzer =

Canadian football player

Profile
- Position: Halfback

Personal information
- Born: c. 1930 (age 95–96)
- Died: Sept 4 2020; Vancouver BC
- Listed height: 6 ft 0 in (1.83 m)
- Listed weight: 180 lb (82 kg)

Career history
- 1950–1954: Winnipeg Blue Bombers
- 1954: BC Lions

Len Meltzer (born c. 1930) is a former Canadian football player who played for the Winnipeg Blue Bombers and BC Lions.
