= 1950 Toronto Argonauts season =

Canadian Football League team season

- Head coach: Frank Clair
- Home stadium: Varsity Stadium

Results
- Record: 6–5–1
- Division place: 2nd, IRFU
- Playoffs: Won Grey Cup

The 1950 Toronto Argonauts season was the 61st season for the team since the franchise's inception in 1873. The team finished in second place in the Interprovincial Rugby Football Union with a 6–5–1 record and qualified for the playoffs for the first time since their Grey Cup win in 1947. The Argonauts defeated the Hamilton Tiger-Cats in a two-game total-points IRFU Final series before winning the Eastern Final over the Toronto Balmy Beach Beachers. The Argonauts faced the Winnipeg Blue Bombers at Varsity Stadium in the Grey Cup for the fourth time in six years in the now-infamous Mud Bowl. Toronto won their ninth Grey Cup by a score of 13–0 in what is currently the last time a team was shut out in championship game.

== Preseason ==
Week	Date	Opponent	Result	Record	Venue
B	Aug 26	Sarnia Imperials	W 47–0	1–0	Varsity Stadium

== Regular season ==
=== Standings ===
Interprovincial Rugby Football Union
Team	GP	W	L	T	PF	PA	Pts
Hamilton Tiger-Cats	12	7	5	0	231	217	14
Toronto Argonauts	12	6	5	1	291	187	13
Montreal Alouettes	12	6	6	0	192	261	12
Ottawa Rough Riders	12	4	7	1	182	231	9

=== Schedule ===
Week	Date	Opponent	Result	Record	Venue
1	Sept 2	vs. Montreal Alouettes	W 26–7	1–0	Varsity Stadium
1	Sept 4	at Hamilton Tiger-Cats	L 6–13	1–1	Ivor Wynne Stadium
2	Sept 9	vs. Montreal Alouettes	W 43–12	2–1	Varsity Stadium
3	Sept 16	vs. Hamilton Tiger-Cats	W 48–8	3–1	Varsity Stadium
4	Sept 23	vs. Ottawa Rough Riders	W 36–15	4–1	Varsity Stadium
5	Sept 30	vs. Ottawa Rough Riders	L 5–15	4–2	Lansdowne Park
6	Oct 7	vs. Hamilton Tiger-Cats	L 23–29	4–3	Varsity Stadium
6	Oct 9	at Hamilton Tiger-Cats	W 20–19	5–3	Ivor Wynne Stadium
7	Oct 14	at Montreal Alouettes	L 16–24	5–4	Delorimier Stadium
8	Oct 21	at Ottawa Rough Riders	T 21–21	5–4–1	Lansdowne Park
9	Oct 28	vs. Ottawa Rough Riders	W 30–7	6–4–1	Varsity Stadium
10	Nov 4	at Montreal Alouettes	L 17–18	6–5–1	Delorimier Stadium

== Postseason ==
Game	Date	Opponent	Result	Venue
IRFU Final Game 1	Nov 11	at Hamilton Tiger-Cats	L 11–13	Ivor Wynne Stadium
IRFU Final Game 2	Nov 15	Hamilton Tiger-Cats	W 24–6	Varsity Stadium
Eastern Final	Nov 18	Toronto Balmy Beach Beachers	W 43–13	Varsity Stadium
Grey Cup	Nov 25	vs. Winnipeg Blue Bombers	W 13–0	Varsity Stadium

=== Grey Cup ===
November 25 @ Varsity Stadium (Attendance: 27,101)

Team	Q1	Q2	Q3	Q4	Total
Winnipeg Blue Bombers	0	0	0	0	0
Toronto Argonauts	1	6	6	0	13
