= Bill Hortie =

Canadian football player

Profile
- Position: Halfback

Personal information
- Born: January 4, 1931; Grande Prairie, Alberta, Canada
- Died: November 8, 2012 (aged 81); Pemberton, British Columbia, Canada
- Listed height: 6 ft 0 in (1.83 m)
- Listed weight: 205 lb (93 kg)

Career information
- University: UBC

Career history
- 1950: Edmonton Eskimos
- 1954–1956: BC Lions

William "Wild Bill" Hortie (January 4, 1931 – November 8, 2012) was a Canadian professional football player who played for the BC Lions and Edmonton Eskimos. He previously played football at the University of British Columbia.
