= Kirby Miller =

Canadian football player (born 1933)

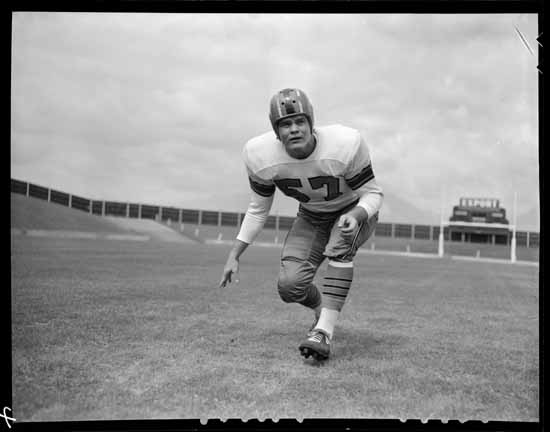
- Miller in 1955

Profile
- Position: Guard

Personal information
- Born: November 17, 1933 (age 92); Jefferson County, Texas, U.S.
- Listed height: 6 ft 0 in (1.83 m)
- Listed weight: 205 lb (93 kg)

Career information
- College: Texas

Career history
- 1955: BC Lions

Donald Kirby Miller (born November 17, 1933) was an American professional football player who played for the BC Lions. He played college football at the University of Texas.
