= Jim Quondamatteo =

Canadian football player (1927–2006)

Profile
- Position: Guard

Personal information
- Born: October 7, 1927; Hamilton, Ontario, Canada
- Died: November 16, 2006 (aged 79); Hamilton, Ontario, Canada
- Listed height: 5 ft 9 in (1.75 m)
- Listed weight: 210 lb (95 kg)

Career information
- College: none - Hamilton Tigers

Career history
- 1948: Hamilton Tiger-Cats
- 1949: Montreal Alouettes
- 1950–1955: Edmonton Eskimos

Awards and highlights
- 3× Grey Cup champion (1949, 1954, 1955,); 3× CFL East All-Star (1950, 1951, 1953)

Jim Quondamatteo (October 7, 1927 – November 16, 2006), was a championship offensive guard for three professional Canadian football teams.

Quondamatteo started his career with the Hamilton Tigers in 1948, but moved to the Montreal Alouettes in 1949, playing 12 games and helping them win their first Grey Cup. He then played for the Edmonton Eskimos for six seasons (1950–1955). As an unsung hero, blocking for greats like Jackie Parker, Normie Kwong, Rollie Miles, Bernie Faloney, Don Getty and Johnny Bright, he helped the Eskimos win two Grey Cup games, in 1954 and 1955.

He was a lifelong resident of Hamilton, Ontario, and at one time served as President of the Hamilton Real Estate Board and a prominent restaurateur.
