= 1950 Hamilton Tiger-Cats season =

Season of Canadian Football League team the Hamilton Tiger-Cats

- Head coach: Carl Voyles
- Home stadium: Civic Stadium

Results
- Record: 7–5
- Division place: 1st, IRFU
- Playoffs: Lost East Final

The 1950 Hamilton Tiger-Cats season was the first in franchise history after the two local clubs, the Hamilton Tigers and Hamilton Wildcats, amalgamated before this season began. The new franchise competed in the Interprovincial Rugby Football Union, the highest level of play in Eastern Canada.

The Tiger-Cats finished in first place in the East Division with a 7–5 record but lost the East Final in a two-game series to the Toronto Argonauts.

== Preseason ==
Week	Date	Opponent	Record	Result	Attendance
A	Aug 19	Sarnia Imperials	W 57–0	1–0	5,000
B	Aug 25	Mansville Eagles	W 45–0	2–0	

== Regular season ==
=== Season standings ===
Interprovincial Rugby Football Union
Team	GP	W	L	T	PF	PA	Pts
Hamilton Tiger-Cats	12	7	5	0	231	217	14
Toronto Argonauts	12	6	5	1	291	187	13
Montreal Alouettes	12	6	6	0	192	261	12
Ottawa Rough Riders	12	4	7	1	182	231	9

=== Season schedule ===
Week	Game	Date	Opponent	Results		Venue	Attendance
Week	Game	Date	Opponent	Score	Record	Venue	Attendance
1	1	September 2	at Ottawa Rough Riders	W 26–17	1–0	Lansdowne Park	
1	2	September 4	vs. Toronto Argonauts	W 13–6	2–0	Civic Stadium	13,000
2	3	September 9	vs. Ottawa Rough Riders	L 15–23	2–1	Civic Stadium	12,000
3	4	September 16	at Toronto Argonauts	L 8–48	2–2	Varsity Stadium	21,500
4	5	September 23	vs. Montreal Alouettes	W 18–12	3–2	Civic Stadium	7,000
5	6	October 1	at Montreal Alouettes	L 18–31	3–3	Delorimier Stadium	15,000
6	7	October 7	at Toronto Argonauts	W 29–23	4–3	Varsity Stadium	14,957
6	8	October 9	vs. Toronto Argonauts	L 19–20	4–4	Civic Stadium	11,000
7	9	October 14	vs. Ottawa Rough Riders	W 32–0	5–4	Civic Stadium	10,000
8	10	October 22	at Montreal Alouettes	L 13–16	5–5	Delorimier Stadium	16,687
9	11	October 28	vs. Montreal Alouettes	W 29–18	6–5	Civic Stadium	12,000
10	12	November 4	at Ottawa Rough Riders	W 11–3	7–5	Lansdowne Park	10,502

== Playoffs ==
=== Schedule ===
Week	Date	Opponent	Result	Attendance
IRFU Final #1	Nov 11	vs. Toronto Argonauts	W 13–11	14,000
IRFU Final #2	Nov 15	at Toronto Argonauts	L 6–24	23,349
