= 1950 Ottawa Rough Riders season =

Canadian football team season

- Head coach: Wally Masters
- Home stadium: Lansdowne Park

Results
- Record: 4–7–1
- Division place: 4th, IRFU
- Playoffs: Did not qualify

The 1950 Ottawa Rough Riders finished in fourth place in the Interprovincial Rugby Football Union with a 4–7–1 record and failed to qualify for the playoffs.

== Preseason ==
| Game | Date | Opponent | Results | | Venue | Attendance |
| Game | Date | Opponent | Score | Record | Venue | Attendance |
|---|---|---|---|---|---|---|
| A | Sat, Aug 12 | vs. New York Giants | L 6–27 | 0–1 | Lansdowne Park | 13,000 |

== Regular season ==
=== Standings ===
Interprovincial Rugby Football Union
| Team | GP | W | L | T | PF | PA | Pts |
|---|---|---|---|---|---|---|---|
| Hamilton Tiger-Cats | 12 | 7 | 5 | 0 | 231 | 217 | 14 |
| Toronto Argonauts | 12 | 6 | 5 | 1 | 291 | 187 | 13 |
| Montreal Alouettes | 12 | 6 | 6 | 0 | 192 | 261 | 12 |
| Ottawa Rough Riders | 12 | 4 | 7 | 1 | 182 | 231 | 9 |

=== Schedule ===
| Week | Game | Date | Opponent | Results | | Venue | Attendance |
| Week | Game | Date | Opponent | Score | Record | Venue | Attendance |
|---|---|---|---|---|---|---|---|
| 1 | 1 | Sun, Aug 27 | at Montreal Alouettes | L 7–14 | 0–1 | Delorimier Stadium | 18,000 |
| 2 | 2 | Sat, Sept 2 | vs. Hamilton Tiger-Cats | L 17–26 | 0–2 | Lansdowne Park | 13,000 |
| 3 | 3 | Sat, Sept 9 | at Hamilton Tiger-Cats | W 23–15 | 1–2 | Civic Stadium | 12,000 |
| 4 | 4 | Sat, Sept 16 | vs. Montreal Alouettes | W 42–15 | 2–2 | Lansdowne Park | 15,000 |
| 5 | 5 | Sat, Sept 23 | at Toronto Argonauts | L 15–36 | 2–3 | Varsity Stadium | 24,938 |
| 6 | 6 | Sat, Sept 30 | vs. Toronto Argonauts | W 15–5 | 3–3 | Lansdowne Park | 16,592 |
| 7 | 7 | Sat, Oct 7 | vs. Montreal Alouettes | W 18–8 | 4–3 | Lansdowne Park | 13,000 |
| 7 | 8 | Sun, Oct 8 | at Montreal Alouettes | L 14–18 | 4–4 | Delorimier Stadium | 18,894 |
| 8 | 9 | Sat, Oct 14 | at Hamilton Tiger-Cats | L 0–32 | 4–5 | Civic Stadium | 10,000 |
| 9 | 10 | Sat, Oct 21 | vs. Toronto Argonauts | T 21–21 | 4–5–1 | Lansdowne Park | 15,000 |
| 10 | 11 | Sat, Oct 28 | at Toronto Argonauts | L 7–30 | 4–6–1 | Varsity Stadium | 19,995 |
| 11 | 12 | Sat, Nov 4 | vs. Hamilton Tiger-Cats | L 3–11 | 4–7–1 | Lansdowne Park | 10,502 |
