= Gerry Vincent =

Canadian football player (born c. 1934)

Profile
- Positions: End, Quarterback

Personal information
- Born: c. 1934
- Listed height: 6 ft 2 in (1.88 m)
- Listed weight: 205 lb (93 kg)

Career history
- 1955–1958: Winnipeg Blue Bombers

Gerry Vincent (born c. 1934) was a Canadian professional football player who played for the Winnipeg Blue Bombers. He previously played for at Daniel McIntyre High School.
