= Jim McPherson (Canadian football) =

Profile
- Positions: Centre, Guard

Personal information
- Born: February 20, 1931; Winnipeg, Manitoba, Canada
- Died: April 23, 2011 (aged 80); Rochester, Minnesota, U.S.
- Listed height: 6 ft 2 in (1.88 m)
- Listed weight: 212 lb (96 kg)

Career history
- 1949–1953: Winnipeg Blue Bombers

James Roy McPherson (February 20, 1931 – April 23, 2011) was a Canadian football player who played for the Winnipeg Blue Bombers.
