= Jeff Russel Memorial Trophy =

Canadian football award

The Jeff Russel Memorial Trophy is a Canadian football award recognizing the most outstanding football player of the Quebec Student Sport Federation (RESQ)

The trophy was originally donated to the Canadian Rugby Union in 1928 to honour former Montreal player Jeff Russel, who was killed in an accident in 1926 while repairing damaged electrical lines for the Montreal Power Company. The trophy was presented to the player who best exemplified skill, sportsmanship, and courage in the Interprovincial Rugby Football Union. In 1973, it became the award given to the Most Outstanding Player of the Canadian Football League's East Division; either the winner of this trophy or the winner of the Jeff Nicklin Memorial Trophy from the CFL’s West Division would go on to win the CFL's Most Outstanding Player Award.

The trophy was officially retired in 1994 at the request of the Russel family, with the Terry Evanshen Trophy replacing the Jeff Russel Memorial Trophy as the official trophy to be awarded to the Most Outstanding Player of the East Division that same year. In 2003, it was re-established for recognizing players in the Quebec conference of U Sports football, with the winner being nominated for the national Hec Crighton Trophy.

== Quebec University Football League / Ontario-Quebec Intercollegiate Football Conference ==
The Most Outstanding Player in the Quebec University Football League (QUFL). Beginning in 2003, the winner is awarded the Jeff Russel Memorial Trophy.

- 2024 – Arnaud Desjardins (QB), Laval Rouge et Or
- 2023 – Jonathan Sénécal (QB), Montreal Carabins
- 2022 – Kevin Mital (WR), Laval Rouge et Or
- 2021 – Olivier Roy (QB), Concordia Stingers
- 2020 – season cancelled – covid 19
- 2019 – Adam Vance (QB), Concordia Stingers
- 2018 – Hugh Richard (QB), Laval Rouge et Or
- 2017 – Hugh Richard (QB), Laval Rouge et Or
- 2016 – Samuel Caron (QB), Montreal Carabins
- 2015 – Trenton Miller (QB), Concordia Stingers
- 2014 – Hugh Richard (QB), Laval Rouge et Or
- 2013 – Jordan Heather (QB), Bishop's Gaiters
- 2012 – Rotrand Sené (RB), Montreal Carabins
- 2011 – Simon Charbonneau-Campeau (WR), Sherbrooke Vert et Or
- 2010 – Simon Charbonneau-Campeau (WR), Sherbrooke Vert et Or
- 2009 – Benoit Groulx (QB), Laval Rouge et Or
- 2008 – Benoit Groulx (QB), Laval Rouge et Or
- 2007 – Jamall Lee (RB), Bishop's Gaiters
- 2006 – Benoit Groulx (QB), Laval Rouge et Or
- 2005 – Scott Syvret (QB), Concordia Stingers
- 2004 – Jeronimo Huerta-Flores (RB), Laval Rouge et Or
- 2003 – Mathieu Bertrand (QB), Laval Rouge et Or

== CFL East Division / IRFU ==
Awarded to the player best exemplifying skill, sportsmanship, and courage until 1972, then to The Most Outstanding Player in the East Conference/Division from 1973 until 1993.

- 1993 – Matt Dunigan (QB), Winnipeg Blue Bombers
- 1992 – Angelo Snipes (LB), Ottawa Rough Riders
- 1991 – Robert Mimbs (RB), Winnipeg Blue Bombers
- 1990 – Mike "Pinball" Clemons (RB), Toronto Argonauts
- 1989 – Tony Champion (WR), Hamilton Tiger-Cats
- 1988 – Earl Winfield (WR), Hamilton Tiger-Cats
- 1987 – Tom Clements (QB), Winnipeg Blue Bombers
- 1986 – James Hood (WR), Montreal Alouettes
- 1985 – Ken Hobart (QB), Hamilton Tiger-Cats
- 1984 – Rufus Crawford (RB), Hamilton Tiger-Cats
- 1983 – Terry Greer (WR), Toronto Argonauts
- 1982 – Condredge Holloway (QB), Toronto Argonauts
- 1981 – Tom Clements (QB), Hamilton Tiger-Cats
- 1980 – Gerry Dattilio (QB), Montreal Alouettes
- 1979 – David Green (RB), Montreal Alouettes
- 1978 – Tony Gabriel (TE), Ottawa Rough Riders
- 1977 – Jimmy Edwards (RB), Hamilton Tiger-Cats
- 1976 – Jimmy Edwards (RB), Hamilton Tiger-Cats
- 1975 – Johnny Rodgers (RB), Montreal Alouettes
- 1974 – Johnny Rodgers (RB), Montreal Alouettes
- 1973 – John Harvey (RB), Montreal Alouettes
- 1972 – Garney Henley (WR), Hamilton Tiger-Cats
- 1971 – Mel Profit (TE), Toronto Argonauts
- 1970 – Bill Symons (RB), Toronto Argonauts
- 1969 – Russ Jackson (QB), Ottawa Rough Riders
- 1968 – Larry Fairholm (DB), Montreal Alouettes
- 1967 – Ron Stewart (RB), Ottawa Rough Riders
- 1966 – Gene Gaines (DB), Ottawa Rough Riders
- 1965 – Bernie Faloney (QB), Montreal Alouettes
- 1964 – Dick Shatto (RB), Toronto Argonauts
- 1963 – Garney Henley (DB), Hamilton Tiger-Cats
- 1962 – George Dixon (RB), Montreal Alouettes
- 1961 – Bobby Jack Oliver (DT), Montreal Alouettes
- 1960 – Ron Stewart (RB), Ottawa Rough Riders
- 1959 – Russ Jackson (QB), Ottawa Rough Riders
- 1958 – Sam Etcheverry (QB), Montreal Alouettes
- 1957 – Dick Shatto (RB), Toronto Argonauts
- 1956 – Hal Patterson (DB/OE), Montreal Alouettes
- 1955 – Avatus Stone (DB), Ottawa Rough Riders
- 1954 – Sam Etcheverry (QB), Montreal Alouettes
- 1953 – Bob Cunningham (FB), Ottawa Rough Riders
- 1952 – Vince Mazza (OT), Hamilton Tiger-Cats
- 1951 – Bruce Cummings (FW), Ottawa Rough Riders
- 1950 – Don Loney (C), Ottawa Rough Riders
- 1949 – Royal Copeland (RB), Toronto Argonauts
- 1948 – Eric Chipper (OT), Ottawa Rough Riders
- 1947 – Virgil Wagner (RB), Montreal Alouettes
- 1946 – Joe Krol (RB), Toronto Argonauts
- 1945 – George Fraser (OG), Ottawa Rough Riders
- 1944 – no award given due to World War II
- 1943 – no award given due to World War II
- 1942 – no award given due to World War II
- 1941 – Tony Golab (RB), Ottawa Rough Riders
- 1940 – Andy Tommy (FW), Ottawa Rough Riders
- 1939 – Bill Davies (FW), Montreal Royals
- 1938 – Wes Cutler (DE), Toronto Argonauts
- 1937 – Teddy Morris (FW), Toronto Argonauts
- 1936 – Arnie Morrison (QB), Ottawa Rough Riders
- 1935 – Abe Eliowitz (RB), Ottawa Rough Riders
- 1934 – Ab Box (QB), Toronto Argonauts
- 1933 – Huck Welch (RB), Montreal AAA Winged Wheelers
- 1932 – Alex Denman (G/FW), Hamilton Tigers
- 1931 – Gordie Perry (RB), Montreal AAA Winged Wheelers
- 1930 – Frank Turville (RB), Toronto Argonauts
- 1929 – D. "Red" Wilson (T), Toronto Argonauts
- 1928 – Ernie Cox (C), Hamilton Tigers

== Most Outstanding Player in the CFL's East Division prior to 1973 ==
Note: Prior to 1973 the Canadian Football League East Division's Most Outstanding Player was not the winner of the Jeff Russel Memorial Trophy, which was a separate award.

- 1972 – Garney Henley (WR), Hamilton Tiger-Cats
- 1971 – Leon McQuay (RB), Toronto Argonauts
- 1970 – Tommy Joe Coffey (WR), Hamilton Tiger-Cats
- 1969 – Russ Jackson (QB), Ottawa Rough Riders
- 1968 – Bill Symons (RB), Toronto Argonauts
- 1967 – Tommy Joe Coffey (WR), Hamilton Tiger-Cats
- 1966 – Russ Jackson (QB), Ottawa Rough Riders
- 1965 – Garney Henley (DB), Hamilton Tiger-Cats
- 1964 – Dick Shatto (RB), Toronto Argonauts
- 1963 – Russ Jackson (QB), Ottawa Rough Riders
- 1962 – George Dixon (RB), Montreal Alouettes
- 1961 – Bernie Faloney (QB), Hamilton Tiger-Cats
- 1960 – Cookie Gilchrist (RB), Toronto Argonauts
- 1959 – Bernie Faloney (QB), Hamilton Tiger-Cats
- 1958 – Dick Shatto (RB), Toronto Argonauts
- 1957 – Hal Patterson (DB/OE), Montreal Alouettes
- 1956 – Hal Patterson (DB/OE), Montreal Alouettes
- 1955 – Dick Shatto (RB), Toronto Argonauts
- 1954 – Alex Webster (RB), Montreal Alouettes
- 1953 – Tex Coulter, Montreal & Gene Roberts, Ottawa
