= Arnie Morrison =

Canadian football player (1907–1976)

Profile
- Position: Quarterback

Personal information
- Born: 1907
- Died: 1976

Career information
- College: none

Career history
- 1933–38: Ottawa Rough Riders

Awards and highlights
- CFL All-Star (1937); Jeff Russel Memorial Trophy (1936)

Arnie Morrison (1907–1976) was a Canadian football player, playing from 1933 to 1938 with the Ottawa Rough Riders.

Morrison was a multi-sport star athlete, but was involved in a junior football brawl and riot when his Ottawa Rideaus played the St. Thomas Yellow Jackets in 1929. He was served with a lifetime ban from football, but after winning Cummings Trophy for fair play in the Civil Service Hockey League, he was reinstated in 1931. His first season with the Riders was 1933 and he would play in the Grey Cup in 1936, was an all-star in 1937, and was fully vindicated when he won the Jeff Russel Memorial Trophy for skill, sportsmanship, and courage in 1936.

He later served overseas with the Canadian Army for three years, during World War II. Morrison also coached the Carleton Ravens football team in 1948 and 1949.
