= John Blaicher =

Canadian football player

Profile
- Position: Halfback

Personal information
- Born: March 5, 1930; Hamilton, Ontario
- Died: May 13, 2006 (aged 76)
- Listed height: 5 ft 11 in (1.80 m)
- Listed weight: 205 lb (93 kg)

Career history
- 1953–1959: Montreal Alouettes

John Blaicher (March 5, 1930 – May 13, 2006) was a Canadian professional football player who played for the Montreal Alouettes. He previously played football for the Brantford Redskins senior team. He was named an all-star for the 1955 CFL season.
