= D. "Red" Wilson =

J.H.D. "Red" Wilson
Profile
- Position: Tackle

Career history
- 1922–30: Toronto Argonauts
- 1931: Sarnia Imperials

Awards and highlights
- 3× CFL All-Star (1927, 28, 29); Jeff Russel Memorial Trophy (1929)

J.H.D. "Red" Wilson was a Canadian football player, playing from 1922 to 1931.

Primarily playing tackle (called "middle"), Wilson also played guard ("inside") and flying wing. Wilson played for the Toronto Argonauts from 1922 to 1930, including 52 regular season games and a team record 21 playoff games. His best season was 1929, when he was named team captain and won the Jeff Russel Memorial Trophy as best player in the east. He then retired, but returned to the Argos for one more season, and finished his career playing with the Sarnia Imperials in 1931.
