= Frank Turville =

Canadian football player

Profile
- Positions: Halfback, kicker

Personal information
- Born: September 23, 1907; Port Arthur, Ontario, Canada
- Died: January 8, 1984 (aged 76); Toronto, Canada

Career information
- College: University of Western Ontario, Osgoode Hall

Career history
- 1928–31: Toronto Argonauts
- 1932–36: Hamilton Tigers

Awards and highlights
- Grey Cup champion (1932); Jeff Russel Memorial Trophy (1930); 6× CFL All-Star (1928, 29, 30, 31, 32, 34)

Franklin David Turville, Q.C. (1907-1984) was a Canadian football player, playing from 1928 to 1936.

A star player with the University of Western Ontario Mustangs football team, Turville was an all-star from his first season (and every season) with the Toronto Argonauts. He played 24 regular season games with the Argos. In 1928, during their only win against the Ottawa Rough Riders, he rushed for 177 yards, scored 18 points and kicked a team record 8 rouges (singles). He was league leader for points scored in 1929 (34) and 1931 (26). His best season was 1930, when he scored 28 points (third in league) and won the Jeff Russel Memorial Trophy as top player in the east. He later played 5 seasons for the Hamilton Tigers, twice more named an all-star and winning the Grey Cup in 1932. After his football career he became a game official (head linesman). He later became a lawyer in Hamilton.

A final recognition of Turville's talent came from Hall of Fame Ottawa Rough Riders player Dave Sprague. Upon retiring he was asked who was the best player, and he said Turville was "the greatest all-around player of them all."

He was enshrined in the University of Western Ontario's "W" Club Athletic Hall of Fame in 1984 and the Windsor / Essex County Sports Hall of Fame in 1986.
