= 39th Grey Cup =

1951 Canadian Football championship game

| Saskatchewan Roughriders | Ottawa Rough Riders |
|---|---|
| (8–6) | (7–5) |
| 14 | 21 |
| Head coach: Harry Smith | Head coach: Clem Crowe |
| | 1 | 2 | 3 | 4 | Total |
|---|---|---|---|---|---|
| Saskatchewan Roughriders | 2 | 0 | 0 | 12 | 14 |
| Ottawa Rough Riders | 6 | 6 | 7 | 2 | 21 |
- Date: November 24, 1951
- Stadium: Varsity Stadium
- Location: Toronto
- Attendance: 27,341

The 39th Grey Cup was the Canadian Football League's championship game of the 1951 season, played on November 24, 1951.

The Ottawa Rough Riders defeated the Saskatchewan Roughriders 21–14 at Toronto's Varsity Stadium before a crowd of 27,341 fans in the first Grey Cup match-up between the two similarly named teams.

== Game summary ==
Saskatchewan Roughriders (14) - TDs, Jack Nix, Sully Glasser; cons., Red Ettinger (2); singles, Glenn Dobbs (2).

Ottawa Rough Riders (21) - TDs, Benny MacDonell, Pete Karpuk, Alton Baldwin; cons., Bob Gain (3); singles, Bruce Cummings (2), Tom O'Malley.
