= Rollin Prather =

American gridiron football player (1925–1996)

Profile
- Position: End

Personal information
- Born: July 17, 1925; Eureka, Kansas, U.S.
- Died: May 28, 1996 (aged 70); Calgary, Alberta, Canada
- Listed height: 6 ft 5 in (1.96 m)
- Listed weight: 240 lb (109 kg)

Career information
- College: Kansas State
- NFL draft: 1950: 7th round, 88th overall pick

Career history
- 1950–1954: Edmonton Eskimos

Awards and highlights
- Grey Cup champion (1954); 3× CFL West All-Star (1950, 1951, 1952)

Rollin Wayne "Rollie" Prather (July 17, 1925 – May 28, 1996) was a Canadian football player who played for the Edmonton Eskimos. He won the Grey Cup with them in 1954. Born in Eureka, Kansas, the son of Raymond Lealand and Irene (Bailey) Prather, he previously played football at and attended Kansas State University, graduating with a Bachelor of Science degree in geology.

Prather was also an All-American thrower for the Kansas State Wildcats track and field team, placing runner-up in the discus throw at the 1947 NCAA track and field championships and 3rd in the shot put at the 1948 NCAA track and field championships.

In 1980, Prather was working as a geologist and served as vice-president of Columbia Gas Development of Canada, Ltd., residing in Edmonton. Prather died at his home in Calgary in 1996.
