= George Gilchrist =

American football player (1928–1980)

- Gilchrist, circa 1950

No. 55, 78
- Positions: Defensive tackle, middle guard

Personal information
- Born: January 9, 1928; Memphis, Tennessee, U.S.
- Died: July 16, 1980 (aged 52); Chicago, Illinois, U.S.
- Listed height: 6 ft 0 in (1.83 m)
- Listed weight: 260 lb (118 kg)

Career information
- High school: Manassas (Memphis)
- College: Tennessee A&I
- NFL draft: 1950: undrafted

Career history
- Toronto Argonauts (1950)*; Montreal Alouettes (1950)*; Toronto Balmy Beach Beachers (1950); Chicago Cardinals (1953); Hamilton Tiger-Cats (1956)*; Boston Patriots (1960)*
- * Offseason or practice squad member only
- Stats at Pro Football Reference

George Robert Gilchrist Jr. (January 9, 1928 – July 16, 1980) was an American professional football player who played for the Chicago Cardinals of the National Football League (NFL). He played college football for the Tennessee A&I Tigers.

== Early life ==
George Robert Gilchrist Jr. was born on January 9, 1928, in Memphis, Tennessee. He attended Manassas High School in Memphis.

== College career ==
Gilchrist enrolled at Tennessee Agricultural & Industrial State College to play college football for the Tigers. He was a four-year letterman from 1946 to 1949. As a senior in 1949, he earned All-Midwest Athletic Association and black college football All-American honors.

== Professional career ==
Gilchrist went undrafted in the 1950 NFL draft. He signed with the Toronto Argonauts of the Interprovincial Rugby Football Union (IRFU) on June 20, 1950. He left the team during training camp after line coach John Kerns took over the tackle spot.

Gilchrist joined the IRFU's Montreal Alouettes on August 3, 1950. He was released several days later and signed by the Toronto Balmy Beach Beachers of the Ontario Rugby Football Union (ORFU). He started all eight games at tackle for the Beach Beachers during the 1950 season as the team finished 6–2. Gilchrist was named an ORFU All-Star.

Gilchrist spent 18 months in Korea during the Korean War, returning to the United States in February 1953. He signed with the Chicago Cardinals of the National Football League in July 1953. He played in 11 games for the Cardinals during the 1953 season as a reserve defensive tackle/middle guard. Gilchrist became a free agent after the season and re-signed with Chicago on June 2, 1954. He was released on September 17 before the start of the 1954 regular season.

On June 1, 1956, it was reported that Gilchrist had signed with the Hamilton Tiger-Cats of the IRFU. He was released on August 16, 1956.

Gilchrist was signed by the Boston Patriots of the upstart American Football League on March 19, 1960. He was later released on July 12, 1960.

== Personal life ==
Gilchrist worked for the state of Illinois. He died on July 16, 1980, at his home in Chicago, Illinois.
