= Benny MacDonell =

Canadian football player (1930–1969)

Profile
- Position: Halfback

Personal information
- Born: 1930; Ottawa, Ontario, Canada
- Died: September 2, 1969 (aged 39); Renfrew, Ontario, Canada
- Listed height: 5 ft 11 in (1.80 m)
- Listed weight: 190 lb (86 kg)

Career history
- 1949–1954: Ottawa Rough Riders

Awards and highlights
- Grey Cup champion (1951)

A. Bennett "Benny" MacDonell (1930 – September 2, 1969) was a Canadian professional football player who played for the Ottawa Rough Riders. He won the Grey Cup with them in 1951. MacDonnell was born in Ottawa, the son of Duncan MacDonnell, Ottawa Chief of Police.
He was later an Ontario Provincial Police officer after his retirement from sports. MacDonnell died in 1969 after accidentally shooting himself while cleaning his service revolver when the weapon discharged, striking him in the head.
