= Bob Hayton (Canadian football) =

Canadian football player (1932–2003)

Robert (Bob) Hayton
Profile
- Positions: Cornerback, Quarterback

Personal information
- Born: June 28, 1932; Calgary, Alberta, Canada
- Died: April 9, 2003 (aged 70); Saskatoon, Saskatchewan, Canada
- Listed height: 6 ft 0 in (1.83 m)
- Listed weight: 185 lb (84 kg)

Career history
- 1953–1954: Edmonton Eskimos

Awards and highlights
- Grey Cup champion (1954); Physician (Cardiologist)- helped to introduce cardiac catheterization to Saskatchewan.

Robert Carlyle Hayton (June 28, 1932 – April 9, 2003) was a Canadian professional football player who played for the Edmonton Eskimos. He won the Grey Cup with them in 1954. He played with the Edmonton Eskimos while completing medical school at the University of Alberta. He interned at the Calgary General Hospital and then moved to Loon Lake, Saskatchewan where he worked for 2 years as a GP. He then moved to Saskatoon to train further in Internal Medicine with another year of training at the London Heart Hospital (England) in Cardiology. He worked for the rest of his career as a Cardiologist in Saskatoon.
