= Max Druen =

American gridiron football player (1928–2003)

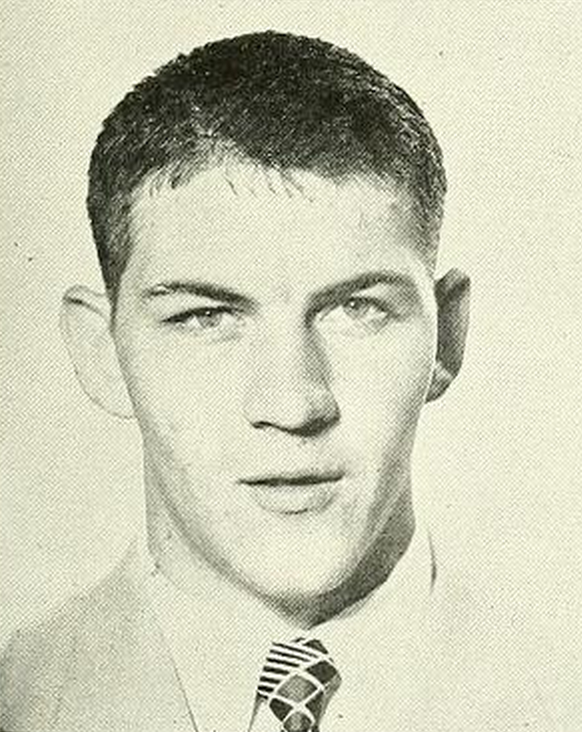
- Druen pictured in Jambalaya 1950, Tulane yearbook

No. 91
- Position: Guard

Personal information
- Born: August 19, 1928; Oklahoma, U.S.
- Died: February 20, 2003 (aged 74); Metairie, Louisiana, U.S.
- Listed height: 6 ft 2 in (1.88 m)
- Listed weight: 230 lb (104 kg)

Career information
- College: Tulane
- NFL draft: 1950: 9th round, 112th overall pick

Career history
- 1950: Saskatchewan Roughriders

Awards and highlights
- CFL West All-Star (1950)

Max Eugene Druen (August 19, 1928 – February 20, 2003) was an American professional football player who played for the Saskatchewan Roughriders. He played college football at Tulane University.
