= Rupe Andrews =

American gridiron football player (1926–2008)

Profile
- Positions: End, Halfback

Personal information
- Born: October 23, 1926; San Diego, California, U.S.
- Died: January 15, 2008 (aged 81); San Diego, California, U.S.
- Listed height: 6 ft 1 in (1.85 m)
- Listed weight: 180 lb (82 kg)

Career information
- High school: La Jolla (CA)
- College: Stanford
- NFL draft: 1950: 18th round, 232nd overall pick

Career history
- 1954: Calgary Stampeders
- 1955: Edmonton Eskimos

Awards and highlights
- Grey Cup champion (1955)

Rupert Burke Andrews, Jr. (October 23, 1926 – January 15, 2008) was an American professional football player who played for the Edmonton Eskimos and Calgary Stampeders. He won the Grey Cup with the Eskimos in 1955. Andrews was born in San Diego, California and played football while he attended Stanford University.
