= Don Loney =

Canadian gridiron football player (1923–2004)

Profile
- Position: Centre

Personal information
- Born: November 16, 1923; Ottawa, Ontario, Canada
- Died: June 19, 2004 (aged 80); Sherbrooke, Nova Scotia, Canada

Career information
- College: NC State

Career history

Playing
- 1943: St. Hyacinthe-Donnacona Navy
- 1943: Ottawa Combines
- 1945: Montreal Hornets
- 1946: Toronto Argonauts
- 1947–1952: Ottawa Rough Riders
- 1954: Calgary Stampeders

Coaching
- 1957–1973: St. Francis Xavier X-Men (HC)

Awards and highlights
- 2× Grey Cup champion (1946, 1951); Jeff Russel Memorial Trophy (1950); 4× CFL East All-Star (1946–1949)
- Canadian Football Hall of Fame (Class of 2013)

Donald John Loney (November 16, 1923 – June 19, 2004) was a Canadian professional football centre and coach. He was called the "Father of Maritime Football" by The Globe and Mail for his work as a coach at St. Francis Xavier University and his contributions to developing the Vanier Cup as a national championship.

== Playing career ==
After graduating from North Carolina State University, he played for the Ottawa Combines and the St. Hyacinthe-Donnacona Navy before serving in the Royal Canadian Navy during World War II.

Post-war, he resumed his career and played nine seasons as a centre in Canadian football with the Montreal Hornets (1945), Toronto Argonauts (1946), Ottawa Rough Riders (1947–1952) and Calgary Stampeders (1954), meriting four East all-star selections and the Jeff Russel Memorial Trophy as East MVP in 1950, a rare feat for a player at his position. He won a pair of Grey Cups, with the Argonauts in 1946 and the Rough Riders in 1951.

Don served in Shearwater as the Base Physical Training and Recreation Officer for two years, and it was during this period that he coached the senior Shearwater Flyers football teams to Nova Scotia and Maritime championships in 1955 and 1956.

== University coaching career ==
Loney headed the St. Francis Xavier X-Men football program from 1957 to 1973. During his tenure as head coach, he compiled a winning percentage of .807, including an eight-year-long undefeated streak, nine conference banners, six Jewett Trophys, four Atlantic Bowl wins, and a win in the second Canadian College Bowl in 1966. He helped establish both the Atlantic and Canadian College Bowls in 1960 and 1965, respectively. Time magazine dubbed St. FX as "The Assassins of Antigonish". Following his retirement in 1973, the Atlantic Bowl MVP award was named for him. He was inducted into Canada's Sports Hall of Fame in 1988. The Loney Bowl was named for him in 2006. He was inducted into the Canadian Football Hall of Fame in 2013, and has also been inducted into the Nova Scotia Sports Hall of Fame, Canadian Forces Hall of Fame and StFX Sports Hall of Fame.
