= Frank Dempsey =

American gridiron football player (1925–2013)

No. 57, 40, 62, 66, 41
- Positions: Linebacker, defensive lineman, offensive lineman

Personal information
- Born: May 27, 1925; Dothan, Alabama, U.S.
- Died: June 1, 2013 (aged 88); Oakville, Ontario, Canada
- Listed height: 6 ft 3 in (1.91 m)
- Listed weight: 235 lb (107 kg)

Career information
- High school: Miami Senior (FL)
- College: Florida
- NFL draft: 1950: 13th round, 166th overall pick

Career history
- Richmond Rebels (1950); Chicago Bears (1950–1953); Hamilton Tiger-Cats (1954–1955); Ottawa Rough Riders (1955)

Awards and highlights
- CFL East All-Star (1955); University of Florida Athletic Hall of Fame

Career NFL/CFL statistics
- NFL games played: 39
- CFL games played: 25
- Stats at Pro Football Reference

James Franklin Dempsey (May 27, 1925 – June 1, 2013) was an American college and professional football player who was a linebacker and lineman in the National Football League (NFL) and the Canadian Football League (CFL) for six seasons in the 1950s. Dempsey played college football for the University of Florida, and thereafter, he played professionally for the Chicago Bears of the NFL and the Hamilton Tiger-Cats and Ottawa Rough Riders of the CFL.

== Early life ==
Dempsey was born in Dothan, Alabama in 1925. He attended Miami Senior High School in Miami, Florida, and he played high school football for the Miami Stingarees.

== College career ==
Dempsey attended the University of Florida in Gainesville, Florida, where he played for coach Raymond Wolf's Florida Gators football team from 1946 to 1949. He was a standout lineman on offense and defense for the Gators at the lowest point in the history of their football program, ironically dubbed the "Golden Era" by the players. Dempsey graduated from the University of Florida with a bachelor's degree in physical education in 1950, and he was later inducted into the University of Florida Athletic Hall of Fame as a "Gator Great" in 1971.

Dempsey was remembered for the pranks and activities of his teammates that revolved around his World War II-era surplus Jeep.

== Professional career ==
The Chicago Bears selected Dempsey in the thirteenth round (166th pick overall) of the 1950 NFL draft, and he played in thirty-nine games for the Bears from 1950 to 1953. He was a versatile player, and at different times, he played both offense and defense, including linebacker, guard and tackle.

Dempsey played his final two professional seasons in the CFL, first for the Hamilton Tiger-Cats in 1954 and the first part of 1955, and then for the Ottawa Rough Riders during the latter part of the 1955 season. He was selected as a CFL East All-Star in the first CFL All-Star Game in 1955.

== Life after football ==
After Dempsey's professional football career ended, he remained in Canada and became the owner of a successful fire arms and sporting goods store. In retirement, he lived in Oakville, Ontario, where he died June 1, 2013.

== See also ==
- Florida Gators football, 1940–49
- List of Chicago Bears players
- List of Florida Gators in the NFL draft
- List of University of Florida alumni
- List of University of Florida Athletic Hall of Fame members
