= Mike King (Canadian football) =

Canadian football player

No. 59
- Positions: Halfback, Fullback

Personal information
- Born: May 13, 1925; Toronto, Ontario, Canada
- Died: December 10, 2018 (aged 93); Edmonton, Alberta, Canada
- Listed height: 6 ft 1 in (1.85 m)
- Listed weight: 210 lb (95 kg)

Career history
- 1949: Toronto Argonauts
- 1950–1957: Edmonton Eskimos

Awards and highlights
- 3× Grey Cup champion (1954, 1955, 1956); 2× CFL West All-Star (1950, 1951)

Michael Joseph King (May 13, 1925 – December 10, 2018) was a Canadian professional football player for the Edmonton Eskimos and Toronto Argonauts. He won the Grey Cup with the Eskimos in 1954, 1955 and 1956. He was born in Toronto and died in Edmonton at the age of 93 from pneumonia in 2018.
