= Bob Hayton (Australian footballer) =

Australian rules footballer

Personal information
- Full name: Bob Hayton
- Born: 28 March 1946 (age 80)
- Height: 175 cm (5 ft 9 in)
- Weight: 73 kg (161 lb)

Playing career^{1}
Years	Club	Games (Goals)
1965	Fitzroy	2 (2)
- ^{1} Playing statistics correct to the end of 1965.

Bob Hayton (born 28 March 1946) is a former Australian rules footballer who played with Fitzroy in the Victorian Football League (VFL).
