= Fred Black =

Canadian football player (1930–2007)

Profile
- Position: Guard

Personal information
- Born: May 1, 1930; Toronto, Ontario, Canada
- Died: September 17, 2007 (aged 77); Markham, Ontario, Canada
- Listed height: 6 ft 0 in (1.83 m)
- Listed weight: 205 lb (93 kg)

Career history
- 1949–1960: Toronto Argonauts

Awards and highlights
- 2× Grey Cup champion (1950, 1952)

Frederick George Black (May 1, 1930 – September 17, 2007) was a Canadian professional football player who played for the Toronto Argonauts. He won the Grey Cup with Toronto in 1950 and 1952. Black previously attended and played football at St. Michael's College, Toronto. In November 2007 he was inducted into the Etobicoke Sports Hall of Fame. He died of cancer a few months prior on September 17, 2007.
