= Holland Alphin =

American gridiron football player (1926–1998)

Holland Aplin
Profile
- Position: End

Personal information
- Born: May 19, 1926; Florida, U.S.
- Died: June 23, 1998 (aged 72); Tampa, Florida, U.S.
- Listed height: 6 ft 4 in (1.93 m)
- Listed weight: 200 lb (91 kg)

Career information
- College: Tampa
- NFL draft: 1952: 15th round, 180th overall pick

Career history
- 1952: Saskatchewan Roughriders

Awards and highlights
- CFL West All-Star (1952)

Holland "Holly" Aplin (May 19, 1926 – June 23, 1998) was an American football player who played for the Saskatchewan Roughriders. He played college football at the University of Tampa.
