= Morris Bailey =

American football player (1925–2002)

No. 56
- Position: End

Personal information
- Born: May 26, 1925; Whitewright, Texas, U.S.
- Died: July 17, 2002 (aged 77); Amarillo, Texas, U.S.
- Listed height: 6 ft 3 in (1.91 m)
- Listed weight: 210 lb (95 kg)

Career information
- High school: Vernon (Vernon, Texas)
- College: TCU (1946–1949)
- NFL draft: 1950: 4th round, 49th overall pick

Career history
- Edmonton Eskimos (1950)

Awards and highlights
- First-team WIFU All-Star (1950); WIFU receiving yards leader (1950)

Morris Emmett "Snake" Bailey (May 26, 1925 – July 17, 2002) was an American professional football end who played for the Edmonton Eskimos of the Western Interprovincial Football Union (WIFU). He played college football at Texas Christian University.

== Early life and college ==
Morris Emmett Bailey was born on May 26, 1925, in Whitewright, Texas. He played high school football and basketball at Vernon High School in Vernon, Texas. He was given the nickname "Snake" while in high school.

Bailey served in the United States Army Air Forces during World War II. He was then a four-year letterman for the TCU Horned Frogs of Texas Christian University from 1946 to 1949, and was a two-time All-Southwest Conference selection. In 1949, he set a school single-game record with 12 receptions. Bailey graduated from TCU in 1950, and was inducted into the school's athletics hall of fame in 1974.

== Professional career ==
Bailey was selected by the San Francisco 49ers in the fourth round, with the 49th overall pick, of the 1950 NFL draft. However, he instead signed with the Edmonton Eskimos of the Western Interprovincial Football Union (WIFU) on March 5, 1950. He dressed in 12 games for the Eskimos during the 1950 season, catching 67 passes for 1,060 yards and four touchdowns. He led the WIFU in receiving yards that year. The Eskimos finished the season with a 7–7 record and lost in the WIFU finals to the Winnipeg Blue Bombers.

== Personal life ==
In 1985, Bailey claimed that, in 1980, TCU head football coach F. A. Dry had asked Bailey to set up an illegal fund for TCU players. Bailey said "He wanted to know if I would put together a slush fund of $7,500 a month. That's $90,000 a year, cash. I wouldn't even do that for my wife." He was the president and CEO of a heavy machinery company in Texas called Plains Machinery Co. He died on July 17, 2002, in Amarillo, Texas.
