= John Brown (footballer, born 1935) =

Scottish footballer

Personal information
- Full name: John Thomas Brown
- Date of birth: 2 April 1935
- Place of birth: Edinburgh, Scotland
- Date of death: 9 April 2000 (aged 65)
- Place of death: Hartlepool, England
- Position: Left back

Youth career
- Musselburgh United

Senior career*
Years	Team	Apps	(Gls)
1952–1956	Hibernian	3	(0)
1955–1956	→ Third Lanark (loan)	23	(0)
1956–1960	Third Lanark	121	(2)
1960–1962	Tranmere Rovers	33	(0)
1962–1964	Hartlepools United	68	(10)
Total		248	(12)
- * Club domestic league appearances and goals

John Thomas Brown (2 April 1935 – 9 April 2000) was a Scottish footballer, who played for Hibernian, Third Lanark, Tranmere and Hartlepools United.
