= Carl Galbreath =

American gridiron football player (1927–2009)

Profile
- Position: Running back

Personal information
- Born: April 15, 1927
- Died: August 26, 2009 (aged 82); Fayetteville, North Carolina

Career information
- College: North Carolina State

Career history
- 1950: Toronto Balmy Beach Beachers

Awards and highlights
- CFL All-Star (1950); Imperial Oil Trophy (1950)

Carl S. Galbreath (April 15, 1927 – August 26, 2009) was an American football running back in the Ontario Rugby Football Union.

A graduate of North Carolina Central University, he was a star player in college, selected as an All-CIAA running back four years and a Little All-American twice. He played one year of football in Canada, 1950, with the Toronto Balmy Beach Beachers of the ORFU and it was a successful one. His team won the league championship, he was an all-star, and he won the Imperial Oil Trophy as MVP in the ORFU.

After his football career, Galbreath served with the Army in the Korean War, and later became a teacher and assistant principal. He was elected to the Central Intercollegiate Athletic Association Hall of Fame in 1995. He died on August 26, 2009.
