= Bruce Cummings =

Canadian football player

Profile
- Position: Halfback

Personal information
- Born: March 1927; Ottawa, Ontario, Canada
- Died: June 16, 1991 (aged 64); Ottawa, Ontario, Canada

Career information
- College: University of Toronto

Career history
- 1950–53: Ottawa Rough Riders

Awards and highlights
- Grey Cup champion (1951); Jeff Russel Memorial Trophy (1951); CFL All-Star (1951)

Bruce Frederick Cummings, (March 1927 – June 16, 1991) was an all-star and Grey Cup champion Canadian football player with the Ottawa Rough Riders, playing from 1950 to 53.

Born in Ottawa and a star football player at the University of Toronto, Cummings joined his hometown Riders in 1950. Though his career was relatively brief, he enjoyed a complete season in 1951, being named an all-star, winning the Jeff Russel Memorial Trophy as the best player in the Interprovincial Rugby Football Union and hoisting the Grey Cup as champion.

His father, W. Garfield Cummings, was a local politician and former Ottawa footballer. Bruce Cummings died at the age of 64 in 1991 following a heart attack.
