= 1952 in Canadian football =

The Toronto Argonauts faced the Edmonton Eskimos in the Grey Cup. Although the Argos would hold on to win the game and their tenth Grey Cup championship, an Argo would not sip from the silver mug again until 1983.

== Events in Canadian football in 1952 ==
The Canadian Rugby Union received television revenue for the first time when it was paid $7,500 by CBC for the rights to televise the Grey Cup game. CBLT Toronto was the only station to carry the game live.

The WIFU increased their games to 16 per team.

== Regular season ==
=== Final regular season standings ===
Note: GP = Games Played, W = Wins, L = Losses, T = Ties, PF = Points For, PA = Points Against, Pts = Points

**Western Interprovincial Football Union**
Team	GP	W	L	T	PF	PA	Pts
**Winnipeg Blue Bombers**	16	12	3	1	394	211	25
**Edmonton Eskimos**	16	9	6	1	291	280	19
**Calgary Stampeders**	16	7	9	0	293	340	14
Saskatchewan Roughriders	16	3	13	0	216	363	6

**Interprovincial Rugby Football Union**
Team	GP	W	L	T	PF	PA	Pts
**Hamilton Tiger-Cats**	12	9	2	1	268	162	19
**Toronto Argonauts**	12	7	4	1	265	191	15
Ottawa Rough Riders	12	5	7	0	200	238	10
Montreal Alouettes	12	2	10	0	136	278	4

**Ontario Rugby Football Union**
Team	GP	W	L	T	PF	PA	Pts
**Sarnia Imperials**	12	11	1	0	312	68	22
**Toronto Balmy Beach Beachers**	11	8	3	0	215	156	16
Brantford Redskins	10	2	10	0	100	189	4
Windsor Royals	9	0	9	0	60	274	0

- Bold text means that they have clinched the playoffs.
- Winnipeg has a bye and will play in the WIFU Finals.
- The last three Windsor Royals games were canceled, leading to an uneven number of games played. The Royals stopped competing in the ORFU after this season.

== Grey Cup playoffs ==
Note: All dates in 1952

=== Semifinals ===
WIFU semifinals – game 1
Edmonton Eskimos @ Calgary Stampeders
Date	Away	Home
October 22	Edmonton Eskimos 12	Calgary Stampeders 31

WIFU semifinals – game 2
Calgary Stampeders @ Edmonton Eskimos
Date	Away	Home
October 25	Calgary Stampeders 7	Edmonton Eskimos 30

- Edmonton won the total-point series by 42–38. The Eskimos will play the Winnipeg Blue Bombers in the WIFU Finals.

=== Finals ===
WIFU Finals – Game 1
Winnipeg Blue Bombers @ Edmonton Eskimos
Date	Away	Home
November 1	Winnipeg Blue Bombers 28	Edmonton Eskimos 12

WIFU Finals – Game 2
Edmonton Eskimos @ Winnipeg Blue Bombers
Date	Away	Home
November 8	Edmonton Eskimos 18	Winnipeg Blue Bombers 12

WIFU Finals – Game 3
Edmonton Eskimos @ Winnipeg Blue Bombers
Date	Away	Home
November 11	Edmonton Eskimos 22	Winnipeg Blue Bombers 11

- Edmonton wins the best of three series 2–1. The Eskimos will advance to the Grey Cup game.

ORFU Finals – Game 1
Sarnia Imperials @ Toronto Balmy Beach Beachers
Date	Away	Home
November 9	Sarnia Imperials 41	Toronto Balmy Beach Beachers 12

ORFU Finals – Game 2
Toronto Balmy Beach Beachers @ Sarnia Imperials
Date	Away	Home
November 15	Toronto Balmy Beach Beachers 7	Sarnia Imperials 24

- Sarnia won the total-point series by 65–19. The Imperials will play the Toronto Argonauts in the Grey Cup semifinal.

IRFU Finals – Game 1
Toronto Argonauts @ Hamilton Tiger-Cats
Date	Away	Home
November 15	Toronto Argonauts 22	Hamilton Tiger-Cats 6

IRFU Finals – Game 2
Hamilton Tiger-Cats @ Toronto Argonauts
Date	Away	Home
November 19	Hamilton Tiger-Cats 27	Toronto Argonauts 11

IRFU Finals – Game 3
Toronto Argonauts @ Hamilton Tiger-Cats
Date	Away	Home
November 22	Toronto Argonauts 12	Hamilton Tiger-Cats 7

- Toronto wins the best of three series 2–1. The Argonauts will play the Sarnia Imperials in the Grey Cup semifinal.

=== Grey Cup semifinal ===
Sarnia Imperials @ Toronto Argonauts
Date	Away	Home
November 26	Sarnia Imperials 15	Toronto Argonauts 34

- The Toronto Argonauts will advance to the Grey Cup game.

== Playoff bracket ==
Quarterfinals
IRFU	Hamilton Tiger Cats	6-27-7
IRFU	Toronto Argonauts	22-11-12
EAST
ORFU	Sarnia Imperials	41-24
ORFU	Toronto Balmy Beach	12-7
WIFU	Winnipeg Blue Bombers
WIFU	BYE
WEST
WIFU	Edmonton Eskimos	12-30
WIFU	Calgary Stampeders	31-7

Semifinals
IRFU	Toronto Argonauts	34
ORFU	Sarnia Imperials	15
WIFU	Winnipeg Blue Bombers	28-12-1
WIFU	Edmonton Eskimos	12-18-22

Grey Cup final
IRFU	Toronto Argonauts	21
WIFU	Edmonton Eskimos	11

== Grey Cup Championship ==
November 29 40th Annual Grey Cup Game: Varsity Stadium – Toronto
WIFU Champion	IRFU Champion
Edmonton Eskimos 11	Toronto Argonauts 21
The Toronto Argonauts are the 1952 Grey Cup Champions

- Note: WIFU Semifinal, as well as Eastern Playoff dates are not confirmed, however since [1] the regular season ended October 18 in the West, and November 8 in the East, and [2] WIFU Final dates, as well as Grey Cup date are accurate, it is reasonable to assume the above dates are accurate.

== 1952 Eastern (Interprovincial Rugby Football Union) All-Stars ==
NOTE: During this time most players played both ways, so the All-Star selections do not distinguish between some offensive and defensive positions.

- QB – Bill Mackrides, Hamilton Tiger-Cats
- RB – Hal Waggoner, Hamilton Tiger-Cats
- RB – Ulysses Curtis, Toronto Argonauts
- RB – Gene Roberts, Ottawa Rough Riders
- E – Red O'Quinn, Montreal Alouettes
- E – Al Bruno, Toronto Argonauts
- FW – Bob Simpson, Ottawa Rough Riders
- C – Red Ettinger, Toronto Argonauts
- G – Eddie Bevan, Hamilton Tiger-Cats
- G – Vince Scott, Hamilton Tiger-Cats
- T – Jim Staton, Montreal Alouettes
- T – Vince Mazza, Hamilton Tiger-Cats

== 1952 Western (Western Interprovincial Football Union) All-Stars ==
NOTE: During this time most players played both ways, so the All-Star selections do not distinguish between some offensive and defensive positions.

=== 1st Team ===
- QB – Jack Jacobs, Winnipeg Blue Bombers
- HB – Tom Casey, Winnipeg Blue Bombers
- HB – Rollie Miles, Edmonton Eskimos
- FB – Johnny Bright, Calgary Stampeders
- E – Rollin Prather, Edmonton Eskimos
- E – Bob Shaw, Calgary Stampeders
- FW – Bud Korchak, Winnipeg Blue Bombers
- C – Bill Blackburn, Calgary Stampeders
- G – Mario DeMarco, Edmonton Eskimos
- G – Jim McPherson, Winnipeg Blue Bombers
- T – Dick Huffman, Winnipeg Blue Bombers
- T – Buddy Tinsley, Winnipeg Blue Bombers

=== 2nd Team ===
- QB – Frank Filchock, Edmonton Eskimos
- QB – Claude Arnold, Edmonton Eskimos
- HB – Pete Thodos, Calgary Stampeders
- HB – Normie Kwong, Edmonton Eskimos
- FB – Ralph McAlister, Winnipeg Blue Bombers
- E – Paul Salata, Calgary Stampeders
- E – Joe Aguirre, Edmonton Eskimos
- E – Holland Alphin, Saskatchewan Roughriders
- FW – Butch Avinger, Saskatchewan Roughriders
- G – Harry Langford, Calgary Stampeders
- G – Dean Bandiera, Winnipeg Blue Bombers
- T – Martin Ruby, Saskatchewan Roughriders

== 1952 Ontario Rugby Football Union All-Stars ==
NOTE: During this time most players played both ways, so the All-Star selections do not distinguish between some offensive and defensive positions.

- QB – Jack McKelvie, Sarnia Imperials
- HB – John Pont, Toronto Balmy Beach Beachers
- HB – Archie McAffer, Sarnia Imperials
- HB – John Duchene, Sarnia Imperials
- E – Fred Smale, Toronto Balmy Beach Beachers
- E – Jack Glendenning, Sarnia Imperials
- FW – John Florence, Sarnia Imperials
- C – Bruce Mattingly, Sarnia Imperials
- G – Bob O'Ree, Toronto Balmy Beach Beachers
- G – Wally McIntosh, Sarnia Imperials
- T – Oatten Fisher, Toronto Balmy Beach Beachers
- T – Maurice Dorocke, Sarnia Imperials
- T – Lloyd "Dutch" Davey, Sarnia Imperials

== 1952 Canadian Football Awards ==
- Jeff Russel Memorial Trophy (IRFU MVP) – Vince Mazza (OT), Hamilton Tiger-Cats
- Jeff Nicklin Memorial Trophy (WIFU MVP) - Jack Jacobs (QB), Winnipeg Blue Bombers
- Gruen Trophy (IRFU Rookie of the Year) - John Fedosoff (RB), Toronto Argonauts
- Dr. Beattie Martin Trophy (WIFU Rookie of the Year) - Lorne Benson (FB), Winnipeg Blue Bombers
- Imperial Oil Trophy (ORFU MVP) - John Pont - Toronto Balmy Beach Beachers
