= Billy Haddleton =

Canadian football player

Profile
- Positions: Quarterback, Halfback

Personal information
- Born: March 20, 1926
- Died: August 10, 1990 (aged 64)
- Listed height: 5 ft 4 in (1.63 m)
- Listed weight: 145 lb (66 kg)

Career history
- 1947: Toronto Argonauts

Awards and highlights
- Grey Cup champion (1947)

William John Frederick Haddleton (March 20, 1926 - August 10, 1990) was a Canadian football player who played for the Toronto Argonauts. He won the Grey Cup with them in 1947.
