= Eddie Bevan =

Profile
- Position: Guard

Personal information
- Born: c. 1925; Hamilton, Ontario, Canada
- Died: 1988 (aged 62–63); Hamilton, Ontario, Canada
- Listed height: 5 ft 11 in (1.80 m)
- Listed weight: 215 lb (98 kg)

Career history
- 1945–1959: Hamilton Tiger-Cats

Awards and highlights
- Grey Cup champion (1953)

Eddie Bevan (c. 1925–1988) was a Canadian professional football player who played for the Hamilton Tiger-Cats. He won the Grey Cup with them in 1953. He previously served in World War II with the Royal Canadian Navy. After his football career, he was a firefighter and worked at a truck dealership. In 2012, he was named to the Hamilton Tiger-Cats All-Time Team. He died after an illness during the week of June 4, 1988.
