= 1953 in Canadian football =

The Hamilton Tiger-Cats defeated the Winnipeg Blue Bombers in the annual Grey Cup in 1953.

== Canadian Football News in 1953 ==
The Canadian Rugby Union was paid in total of $20,500 by three television stations for the rights to show the Grey Cup game live. Edmonton's Billy Vessels (RB), became the first player to win the Schenley Award as the Most Outstanding Player Award. G. Sydney Halter, QC was named as WIFU Commissioner.

For the 1953 season, it was ruled that the ORFU winners would travel west to play the WIFU winners in a semi-final game. This arrangement continued in the 1954 season.

== Regular season ==
=== Final regular season standings ===
Note: GP = Games Played, W = Wins, L = Losses, T = Ties, PF = Points For, PA = Points Against, Pts = Points

**Western Interprovincial Football Union**
Team	GP	W	L	T	PF	PA	Pts
**Edmonton Eskimos**	16	12	4	0	276	157	24
**Saskatchewan Roughriders**	16	8	7	1	243	239	17
**Winnipeg Blue Bombers**	16	8	8	0	226	226	16
Calgary Stampeders	16	3	12	1	190	313	7

**Interprovincial Rugby Football Union**
Team	GP	W	L	T	PF	PA	Pts
**Montreal Alouettes**	14	8	6	0	292	229	16
**Hamilton Tiger-Cats**	14	8	6	0	229	243	16
Ottawa Rough Riders	14	7	7	0	266	238	14
Toronto Argonauts	14	5	9	0	172	249	10

**Ontario Rugby Football Union**
Team	GP	W	L	T	PF	PA	Pts
**Kitchener-Waterloo Dutchmen**	12	8	4	0	218	178	16
**Sarnia Imperials**	12	8	4	0	231	101	16
**Toronto Balmy Beach Beachers**	12	8	4	0	252	145	16
Brantford Redskins	12	0	12	0	73	350	0

- Bold text means that they have clinched the playoffs.
- Edmonton has a bye and will play in the WIFU Finals.
- Kitchener-Waterloo has a bye and will play in the ORFU Finals.

== Grey Cup playoffs ==
Note: All dates in 1953

=== Semifinals ===
WIFU semifinals – game 1
Saskatchewan Roughriders @ Winnipeg Blue Bombers
Date	Away	Home
October 28	Saskatchewan Roughriders 5	Winnipeg Blue Bombers 43

WIFU semifinals – game 2
Winnipeg Blue Bombers @ Saskatchewan Roughriders
Date	Away	Home
October 31	Winnipeg Blue Bombers 17	Saskatchewan Roughriders 18

- Winnipeg won the total-point series by 60–23. The Blue Bombers will play the Edmonton Eskimos in the WIFU Finals.

ORFU semifinals – game 1
Toronto Balmy Beach Beachers @ Sarnia Imperials
Date	Away	Home
November 7	Toronto Balmy Beach Beachers 0	Sarnia Imperials 2

ORFU semifinals – game 2
Sarnia Imperials @ Toronto Balmy Beach Beachers
Date	Away	Home
November 8	Sarnia Imperials 10	Toronto Balmy Beach Beachers 18

- Toronto Balmy Beach won the total-point series by 18–12. The Beachers will play the Kitchener-Waterloo Dutchmen in the ORFU Finals.

=== Finals ===
WIFU Finals – Game 1
Winnipeg Blue Bombers @ Edmonton Eskimos
Date	Away	Home
November 7	Winnipeg Blue Bombers 7	Edmonton Eskimos 25

WIFU Finals – Game 2
Edmonton Eskimos @ Winnipeg Blue Bombers
Date	Away	Home
November 11	Edmonton Eskimos 17	Winnipeg Blue Bombers 21

WIFU Finals – Game 3
Winnipeg Blue Bombers @ Edmonton Eskimos
Date	Away	Home
November 14	Winnipeg Blue Bombers 30	Edmonton Eskimos 24

- Winnipeg wins the best of three series 2–1. The Blue Bombers will play the Toronto Balmy Beach Beachers in the Grey Cup semifinal.

ORFU Finals – Game 1
Toronto Balmy Beach Beachers @ Kitchener-Waterloo Dutchmen
Date	Away	Home
November 11	Toronto Balmy Beach Beachers 6	Kitchener-Waterloo Dutchmen 9

ORFU Finals – Game 2
Kitchener-Waterloo Dutchmen @ Toronto Balmy Beach Beachers
Date	Away	Home
November 15	Kitchener-Waterloo Dutchmen 12	Toronto Balmy Beach Beachers 24

- Toronto won the total-point series by 30–21. The Beachers will play the Winnipeg Blue Bombers in the Grey Cup semifinal.

IRFU Finals – Game 1
Montreal Alouettes @ Hamilton Tiger-Cats
Date	Away	Home
November 18	Montreal Alouettes 12	Hamilton Tiger-Cats 37

IRFU Finals – Game 2
Hamilton Tiger-Cats @ Montreal Alouettes
Date	Away	Home
November 22	Hamilton Tiger-Cats 22	Montreal Alouettes 11

- Hamilton wins the best of three series 2–0. The Tiger-Cats will advance to the Grey Cup game.

=== Grey Cup semifinal ===
Toronto Balmy Beach Beachers @ Winnipeg Blue Bombers
Date	Away	Home
November 21	Toronto Balmy Beach Beachers 4	Winnipeg Blue Bombers 24

- The Winnipeg Blue Bombers will advance to the Grey Cup game.

== Playoff bracket ==
Quarterfinals
EAST
WIFU	Edmonton Eskimos	25-17-24
WIFU	Winnipeg Blue Bombers	7-21-30
WEST
ORFU	Kitchener-Waterloo Dutchmen	9-12
ORFU	Toronto Balmy Beach	6-24

Semifinals
IRFU	Montreal Alouettes	12-11
IRFU	Hamilton Tiger Cats	37-22
WIFU	Winnipeg Blue Bombers	24
ORFU	Toronto Balmy Beach	4

Grey Cup final
IRFU	Hamilton Tiger Cats	12
WIFU	Winnipeg Blue Bombers	6

== Grey Cup Championship ==
November 28 41st Annual Grey Cup Game: Varsity Stadium – Toronto, Ontario
WIFU Champion	IRFU Champion
Winnipeg Blue Bombers 6	Hamilton Tiger-Cats 12
The Hamilton Tiger-Cats are the 1953 Grey Cup Champions

== 1953 Eastern (Interprovincial Rugby Football Union) All-Stars ==
=== Offence ===
- QB – Sam Etcheverry, Montreal Alouettes
- RB – Avatus Stone, Ottawa Rough Riders
- RB – Joe Scudero, Toronto Argonauts
- RB – Gene Roberts, Ottawa Rough Riders
- E – Red O'Quinn, Montreal Alouettes
- E – Bernie Flowers, Ottawa Rough Riders
- FW – Bob Simpson, Ottawa Rough Riders
- C – Tommy Hugo, Montreal Alouettes
- OG – Kaye Vaughan, Ottawa Rough Riders
- OG – Ed Bradley, Montreal Alouettes
- OT – Tex Coulter, Montreal Alouettes
- OT – Vince Mazza, Hamilton Tiger-Cats

=== Defence ===
- DT – Tex Coulter, Montreal Alouettes
- DT – Vince Mazza, Hamilton Tiger-Cats
- DE – Pete Neumann, Hamilton Tiger-Cats
- DE – Doug McNichol, Montreal Alouettes
- DG – Vince Scott, Hamilton Tiger-Cats
- DG – Eddie Bevan, Hamilton Tiger-Cats
- LB – Red Ettinger, Toronto Argonauts
- LB – Ralph Toohy, Hamilton Tiger-Cats
- LB – Tommy Hugo, Montreal Alouettes
- DB – Dick Brown, Hamilton Tiger-Cats
- DB – Howie Turner, Ottawa Rough Riders
- DB – Lou Kusserow, Hamilton Tiger-Cats
- S - Teddy Toogood, Toronto Argonauts

== 1953 Western (Western Interprovincial Football Union) All-Stars ==
=== Offence ===
- QB – Claude Arnold, Edmonton Eskimos
- RB – Rollie Miles, Edmonton Eskimos
- RB – Billy Vessels, Edmonton Eskimos
- RB – Normie Kwong, Edmonton Eskimos
- E – Mac Speedie, Saskatchewan Roughriders
- E – Bud Grant, Winnipeg Blue Bombers
- FW – Bud Korchak, Winnipeg Blue Bombers
- C – Eagle Keys, Edmonton Eskimos
- OG – Mike Cassidy, Saskatchewan Roughriders
- OG – Jim Quondamatteo, Edmonton Eskimos
- OT – Leon Manley, Edmonton Eskimos
- OT – Martin Ruby, Saskatchewan Roughriders

=== Defence ===
- DT – Dick Huffman, Winnipeg Blue Bombers
- DT – Martin Ruby, Saskatchewan Roughriders
- DE – Frank Anderson, Edmonton Eskimos
- DE – Ezzret Anderson, Calgary Stampeders
- DG – Dean Bandiera, Winnipeg Blue Bombers
- DG – Gordon Brown, Calgary Stampeders
- LB – John Wozniak, Saskatchewan Roughriders
- LB – Tony Momsen, Calgary Stampeders
- DB – Ray Willsey, Edmonton Eskimos
- DB – Bobby Marlow, Saskatchewan Roughriders
- DB – Neill Armstrong, Winnipeg Blue Bombers
- S – Tom Casey, Winnipeg Blue Bombers

== 1953 Ontario Rugby Football Union All-Stars ==
NOTE: During this time most players played both ways, so the All-Star selections do not distinguish between some offensive and defensive positions.

- QB – Bob Schneidenbach, Toronto Balmy Beach Beachers
- HB – Dick Gregory - Toronto Balmy Beach Beachers
- HB – Jack Mancos, Kitchener-Waterloo Dutchmen
- HB – John Duchene, Sarnia Imperials
- E – Harvey Singleton, Toronto Balmy Beach Beachers
- E – Keith Fisher, Sarnia Imperials
- FW – Johnny Chorostecki, Sarnia Imperials
- C – Bruce Mattingly, Sarnia Imperials
- G – Jay Fry, Kitchener-Waterloo Dutchmen
- G – Lloyd "Dutch" Davey, Sarnia Imperials
- T – Oatten Fisher, Toronto Balmy Beach Beachers
- T – Maurice Dorocke, Sarnia Imperials

== 1953 Canadian Football Awards ==
- Most Outstanding Player Award – Billy Vessels (RB), Edmonton Eskimos
- Jeff Russel Memorial Trophy (IRFU MVP) – Bob Cunningham (FB), Ottawa Rough Riders
- Jeff Nicklin Memorial Trophy (WIFU MVP) - John Henry Johnson (RB), Calgary Stampeders
- Gruen Trophy (IRFU Rookie of the Year) - Bob Dawson (RB), Hamilton Tiger-Cats
- Dr. Beattie Martin Trophy (WIFU Rookie of the Year) - Gordon Sturtridge (DE), Saskatchewan Roughriders
- Imperial Oil Trophy (ORFU MVP) - Dick Gregory - Toronto Balmy Beach Beachers
