= Vince Mazza =

Player of American and Canadian football (1925–1993)

Profile
- Positions: End, Tackle

Personal information
- Born: March 25, 1925; Niagara Falls, New York, U.S.
- Died: December 5, 1993 (aged 68); Winona, Ontario, Canada

Career information
- College: None

Career history
- 1945–1946: Detroit Lions (NFL)
- 1947–1949: Buffalo Bills (AAFC)
- 1950–1954: Hamilton Tiger-Cats (IRFU)

Awards and highlights
- Jeff Russel Memorial Trophy (1952)
- Stats at Pro Football Reference

Vincent L. Mazza (March 25, 1925 – December 5, 1993) was an all-star Canadian football player. He was a two-way player, playing offensive and defensive line, and sometimes tight end.

Mazza did not attend college, but went directly to the pro leagues from Trott Vocational High School. He played for the Detroit Lions of the National Football League (NFL) for six games in 1945 and 1946. He moved to the up-start All-America Football Conference (AAFC) in 1947, with the Buffalo Bills. He played three years (1947–1949) there, mostly as a lineman, catching two passes and making one interception, and returning a lateral pass for a touchdown. He played in their 1948 championship loss to the Cleveland Browns.

He was recruited by the Hamilton Tiger-Cats of the Interprovincial Rugby Football Union, and played five seasons with them (1950–1954). He was an all-star as an end from 1950 to 1952, was a double all-star in 1953 (both offense and defense) and was an offensive line all-star in 1954. He won both the Grey Cup and the Jeff Russel Memorial Trophy as best player in the East in 1952.

Vince settled in Winona, Ontario, and continued in the game as the color man for CHML radio for the Tiger-Cat games. He was often seen at the Winona High School football practices helping to develop young athletes.
