= Oatten Fisher =

American gridiron football player (1924–2006)

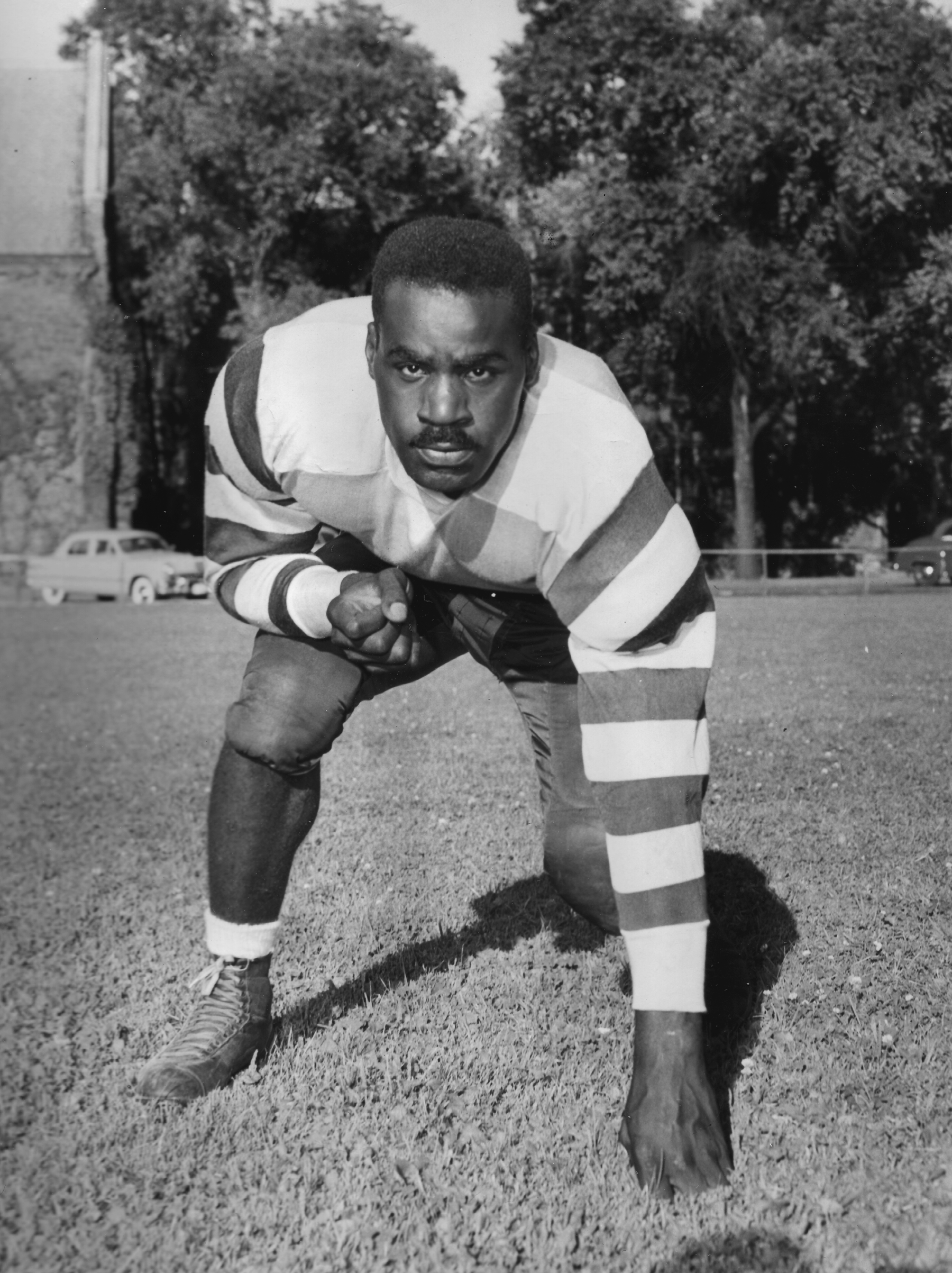

Profile
- Positions: Guard, Tackle

Personal information
- Born: April 1, 1924; Salisbury, North Carolina, U.S.
- Died: April 30, 2006 (aged 82); Toronto, Ontario, Canada
- Listed height: 6 ft 3 in (1.91 m)
- Listed weight: 225 lb (102 kg)

Career information
- College: University of North Carolina

Career history
- 1950: Toronto Balmy Beach Beachers
- 1951: Toronto Argonauts
- 1952–1953: Toronto Balmy Beach Beachers
- 1954: Toronto Argonauts
- 1955–1956: Toronto Balmy Beach Beachers
- 1959: Calgary Stampeders

Awards and highlights
- 3× ORFU All-Star (1950, 1953, 1955); Salisbury/Rowan Sports Hall of Fame Class of 2015 (posthumous)

Oatten Fisher (April 1, 1924 – April 30, 2006), was an all-star Canadian Football League player.

Having played college football at the University of North Carolina, Fisher embarked on an 8-year career in Canada. While he only played 16 games over 2 seasons with the Toronto Argonauts, he had a successful stint with the Toronto Balmy Beach Beachers of the Ontario Rugby Football Union, where he was selected an all-star 3 times. He finished his football career in 1959 with the Calgary Stampeders.

Fisher was among the first African-American players to break the colour barrier in the CFL. He died in Toronto on April 30, 2006.
