= 1950 in Canadian football =

== Canadian Football News in 1950 ==
The Hamilton Tigers and the Hamilton Wildcats merged to form the Hamilton Tiger-Cats. The Regina franchise officially changed their name to become the Saskatchewan Roughriders on Saturday, April 1.

The WIFU allowed the third place team in the standings to be qualified for a playoff berth. The first professional playoff game was played at night under lights – Winnipeg Blue Bombers and the Edmonton Eskimos. The 38th Grey Cup, nicknamed "The Mud Bowl", was held at Toronto's Varsity Stadium with an attendance of 27,101.

== Regular season ==
=== Final regular season standings ===
Note: GP = Games Played, W = Wins, L = Losses, T = Ties, PF = Points For, PA = Points Against, Pts = Points

**Western Interprovincial Football Union**
Team	GP	W	L	T	PF	PA	Pts
**Winnipeg Blue Bombers**	14	10	4	0	221	156	20
**Saskatchewan Roughriders**	14	7	7	0	207	177	14
**Edmonton Eskimos**	14	7	7	0	201	197	14
Calgary Stampeders	14	4	10	0	152	251	8

**Interprovincial Rugby Football Union**
Team	GP	W	L	T	PF	PA	Pts
**Hamilton Tiger-Cats**	12	7	5	0	231	217	14
**Toronto Argonauts**	12	6	5	1	291	187	13
Montreal Alouettes	12	6	6	0	192	261	12
Ottawa Rough Riders	12	4	7	1	182	231	9

**Ontario Rugby Football Union**
Team	GP	W	L	T	PF	PA	Pts
**Toronto Balmy Beach Beachers**	8	6	2	0	162	100	12
**Sarnia Imperials**	8	4	4	0	164	102	8
Windsor Rockets	8	2	6	0	52	176	4

- Bold text means that they have clinched the playoffs.
- Winnipeg gets a bye and will play in the WIFU Finals.

== Grey Cup playoffs ==
Note: All dates in 1950

=== Semifinals ===
**WIFU semifinals**
Edmonton Eskimos @ Saskatchewan Roughriders
Date	Away	Home
October 28	**Edmonton Eskimos 24**	Saskatchewan Roughriders 1

- The Edmonton Eskimos will play the Winnipeg Blue Bombers in the WIFU Finals.

=== Finals ===
**WIFU Finals – Game 1**
Winnipeg Blue Bombers @ Edmonton Eskimos
Date	Away	Home
November 4	Winnipeg Blue Bombers 16	**Edmonton Eskimos 17**

**WIFU Finals – Game 2**
Edmonton Eskimos @ Winnipeg Blue Bombers
Date	Away	Home
November 11	Edmonton Eskimos 12	**Winnipeg Blue Bombers 22**

**WIFU Finals – Game 3**
Edmonton Eskimos @ Winnipeg Blue Bombers
Date	Away	Home
November 13	Edmonton Eskimos 6	**Winnipeg Blue Bombers 29**

- Winnipeg won the total-point series by 67–35. The Blue Bombers will advance to the Grey Cup game.

**ORFU Finals – Game 1**
Sarnia Imperials @ Toronto Balmy Beach Beachers
Date	Away	Home
November 5	Sarnia Imperials 11	**Toronto Balmy Beach Beachers 17**

**ORFU Finals – Game 2**
Toronto Balmy Beach Beachers @ Sarnia Imperials
Date	Away	Home
November 11	**Toronto Balmy Beach Beachers 18**	Sarnia Imperials 10

- Toronto won the total-point series by 35–21. The Balmy Beach Beachers will play the Toronto Argonauts in the Eastern finals.

**IRFU Finals – Game 1**
Hamilton Tiger-Cats @ Toronto Argonauts
Date	Away	Home
November 11	**Hamilton Tiger-Cats 13**	Toronto Argonauts 11

**IRFU Finals – Game 2**
Toronto Argonauts @ Hamilton Tiger-Cats
Date	Away	Home
November 15	**Toronto Argonauts 24**	Hamilton Tiger-Cats 6

- Toronto won the total-point series by 35–19. The Argonauts will play the Toronto Balmy Beach Beachers in the Eastern finals.

=== Eastern Finals ===
Toronto Balmy Beach Beachers @ Toronto Argonauts
Date	Away	Home
November 18	Toronto Balmy Beach Beachers 13	**Toronto Argonauts 43**

- The Toronto Argonauts will advance to the Grey Cup game.

== Playoff bracket ==
**Quarterfinals**
IRFU	Hamilton Tiger Cats	19
IRFU	Toronto Argonauts	35
**EAST**
ORFU	Toronto Balmy Beach	35
ORFU	Sarnia Imperials	21
WIFU	Winnipeg Blue Bombers
WIFU	BYE
**WEST**
WIFU	Edmonton Eskimos	24
WIFU	Regina Roughriders	1

**Semifinals**
IRFU	Toronto Argonauts	43
ORFU	Toronto Balmy Beach	13
WIFU	Winnipeg Blue Bombers	67
WIFU	Edmonton Eskimos	35

**Grey Cup final**
IRFU	Toronto Argonauts	13
WIFU	Winnipeg Blue Bombers	0

== Grey Cup Championship ==
November 25 38th Annual Grey Cup Game: Varsity Stadium – Toronto, Ontario
WIFU Champion	IRFU Champion
Winnipeg Blue Bombers 0	**Toronto Argonauts 13**
**The Toronto Argonauts are the 1950 Grey Cup Champions**

The Argonauts defeated Winnipeg in what is now known simply as the ‘Mud Bowl’.

== 1950 Eastern (Combined IRFU & ORFU) All-Stars ==
NOTE: During this time most players played both ways, so the All-Star selections do not distinguish between some offensive and defensive positions.

=== 1st Team ===
- QB – Frank Filchock, Montreal Alouettes
- HB – Ulysses Curtis, Toronto Argonauts
- HB – Bill Gregus, Hamilton Tiger-Cats
- HB – Edgar Jones, Hamilton Tiger-Cats
- E – Vince Mazza, Hamilton Tiger-Cats
- E – Bill Stanton, Ottawa Rough Riders
- FW – Rod Pantages, Montreal Alouettes
- C – Ed Hirsch, Toronto Argonauts
- G – Ray Cicia, Montreal Alouettes
- G – Vince Scott, Hamilton Tiger-Cats
- T – Herb Trawick, Montreal Alouettes
- T – Ralph Sazio, Hamilton Tiger-Cats

=== 2nd Team ===
- QB – Al Dekdebrun, Toronto Argonauts
- HB – Carl Galbreath, Toronto Balmy Beach Beachers
- HB – Virgil Wagner, Montreal Alouettes
- HB – Bob McFarlane, University of Western Ontario
- E – Keith Fisher, Sarnia Imperials
- E – Ralph Toohy, Montreal Alouettes
- FW – Johnny Chorostecki, Sarnia Imperials
- C – Dwight Follin, Toronto Balmy Beach Beachers
- G – Fred Black, Toronto Argonauts
- G – Jack Carpenter, Hamilton Tiger-Cats
- G – Bruce Mattingly, Sarnia Imperials
- T – Oatten Fisher, Toronto Balmy Beach Beachers
- T – Jack Kerns, Toronto Argonauts

== 1950 Western Interprovincial Football Union All-Stars ==
NOTE: During this time most players played both ways, so the All-Star selections do not distinguish between some offensive and defensive positions.

=== 1st Team ===
- QB – Jack Jacobs, Winnipeg Blue Bombers
- HB – Tom Casey, Winnipeg Blue Bombers
- HB – Al Bodine, Saskatchewan Roughriders
- FB – Mike King, Edmonton Eskimos
- E – Joe Aguirre, Winnipeg Blue Bombers
- E – Morris Bailey, Edmonton Eskimos
- FW – Bob Paffrath, Edmonton Eskimos
- C – John Brown, Winnipeg Blue Bombers
- G – Max Druen, Saskatchewan Roughriders
- G – Riley Matheson, Calgary Stampeders
- T – Glenn Johnson, Winnipeg Blue Bombers
- T – Buddy Tinsley, Winnipeg Blue Bombers

=== 2nd Team ===
- QB – Lindy Berry, Edmonton Eskimos
- HB – Del Wardien, Saskatchewan Roughriders
- HB – Royal Copeland, Calgary Stampeders
- HB – Harry Hood, Calgary Stampeders
- FB – Ken Charlton, Saskatchewan Roughriders
- E – Ed Henke, Winnipeg Blue Bombers
- E – Rollin Prather, Edmonton Eskimos
- C – James W. Kynes, Saskatchewan Roughriders
- G – Gary Deleeuw, Winnipeg Blue Bombers
- G – Jim Quondamatteo, Edmonton Eskimos
- T – Bob Bryant, Calgary Stampeders
- T – Mike Cassidy, Saskatchewan Roughriders
- T – Don Durno, Edmonton Eskimos

== 1950 Ontario Rugby Football Union All-Stars ==
NOTE: During this time most players played both ways, so the All-Star selections do not distinguish between some offensive and defensive positions.

- QB – Gerry Tuttle, Toronto Balmy Beach Beachers
- HB – Carl Galbreath, Toronto Balmy Beach Beachers
- HB – Johnny Chorostecki, Sarnia Imperials
- DB – Jim Chaine, Windsor Rockets
- E – Andy Gilmour, Toronto Balmy Beach Beachers
- E – Keith Fisher, Sarnia Imperials
- FW – Billy Haddleton, Toronto Balmy Beach Beachers
- C – Dwight Follin, Toronto Balmy Beach Beachers
- G – Bruce Mattingly, Sarnia Imperials
- G – Ross Taylor, Toronto Balmy Beach Beachers
- T – Oatten Fisher, Toronto Balmy Beach Beachers
- T – George Gilchrist, Toronto Balmy Beach Beachers

== 1950 Canadian Football Awards ==
- Jeff Russel Memorial Trophy (IRFU MVP) – Don Loney (C), Ottawa Rough Riders
- Jeff Nicklin Memorial Trophy (WIFU MVP) - Lindy Berry (QB), Edmonton Eskimos
- Gruen Trophy (IRFU Rookie of the Year) - Bob McDonald (RB), Hamilton Tiger-Cats
- Dr. Beattie Martin Trophy (WIFU Rookie of the Year) - Gordon Brown (DG), Calgary Stampeders
- Imperial Oil Trophy (ORFU MVP) - Carl Galbreath - Toronto Balmy Beach Beachers
