= 1951 in Canadian football =

After a 17-year absence, the Saskatchewan Roughriders returned to the Grey Cup final. Their losing streak in the big game continued, however, as it was the other Rough Riders that took home the prize.

== Canadian football news in 1951 ==
The BC Lions were formed in January at the Arctic Club in Vancouver; however, the franchise would begin play at the start of the 1954 season.

E. Kent Philips of Saskatoon, Saskatchewan, was appointed WIFU Commissioner. The IRFU allowed the third-place Toronto Argonauts to be in the playoffs due to similar regular season records with the other top two teams.

On October 27, The Duke of Edinburgh and The Princess Elizabeth, Duchess of Edinburgh (later Queen Elizabeth II) attended the western semi-final in Edmonton.

== Regular season ==
=== Final regular season standings ===
Note: GP = Games Played, W = Wins, L = Losses, T = Ties, PF = Points For, PA = Points Against, Pts = Points

**Western Interprovincial Football Union**
| Team | GP | W | L | T | PF | PA | Pts |
|---|---|---|---|---|---|---|---|
| **Saskatchewan Roughriders** | 14 | 8 | 6 | 0 | 277 | 219 | 16 |
| **Edmonton Eskimos** | 14 | 8 | 6 | 0 | 306 | 262 | 16 |
| **Winnipeg Blue Bombers** | 14 | 8 | 6 | 0 | 303 | 311 | 16 |
| Calgary Stampeders | 14 | 4 | 10 | 0 | 205 | 299 | 8 |

**Interprovincial Rugby Football Union**
| Team | GP | W | L | T | PF | PA | Pts |
|---|---|---|---|---|---|---|---|
| **Ottawa Rough Riders** | 12 | 7 | 5 | 0 | 218 | 197 | 14 |
| **Hamilton Tiger-Cats** | 12 | 7 | 5 | 0 | 229 | 131 | 14 |
| **Toronto Argonauts** | 12 | 7 | 5 | 0 | 226 | 205 | 14 |
| Montreal Alouettes | 12 | 3 | 9 | 0 | 146 | 286 | 6 |

**Ontario Rugby Football Union**
| Team | GP | W | L | T | PF | PA | Pts |
|---|---|---|---|---|---|---|---|
| **Sarnia Imperials** | 10 | 9 | 1 | 0 | 268 | 60 | 18 |
| **Toronto Balmy Beach Beachers** | 10 | 7 | 3 | 0 | 173 | 124 | 14 |
| McMaster University | 6 | 2 | 4 | 0 | 114 | 112 | 8 |
| Windsor Royals | 10 | 0 | 10 | 0 | 27 | 286 | 0 |

- Bold text means that they have clinched the playoffs.
- Saskatchewan and Ottawa both have first round byes.
- McMaster University started ORFU play in October. It played 4 point games

== Grey Cup playoffs ==
Note: All dates in 1951

=== Semifinals ===
WIFU semifinals
Winnipeg Blue Bombers @ Edmonton Eskimos
| Date | Away | Home |
|---|---|---|
| October 27 | Winnipeg Blue Bombers 1 | Edmonton Eskimos 4 |

- The Edmonton Eskimos went on to play the Saskatchewan Roughriders in the WIFU Finals.

IRFU semifinals – game 1
Hamilton Tiger-Cats @ Toronto Argonauts
| Date | Away | Home |
|---|---|---|
| November 7 | Hamilton Tiger-Cats 24 | Toronto Argonauts 7 |

IRFU semifinals – game 2
Toronto Argonauts @ Hamilton Tiger-Cats
| Date | Away | Home |
|---|---|---|
| November 10 | Toronto Argonauts 21 | Hamilton Tiger-Cats 7 |

- Hamilton won the total-point series by 31–28. The Tiger-Cats went on to play the Ottawa Rough Riders in the IRFU Finals.

=== Finals ===
WIFU Finals – Game 1
Saskatchewan Roughriders @ Edmonton Eskimos
| Date | Away | Home |
|---|---|---|
| November 3 | Saskatchewan Roughriders 11 | Edmonton Eskimos 15 |

WIFU Finals – Game 2
Edmonton Eskimos @ Saskatchewan Roughriders
| Date | Away | Home |
|---|---|---|
| November 10 | Edmonton Eskimos 5 | Saskatchewan Roughriders 12 |

WIFU Finals – Game 3
Edmonton Eskimos @ Saskatchewan Roughriders
| Date | Away | Home |
|---|---|---|
| November 12 | Edmonton Eskimos 18 | Saskatchewan Roughriders 19 |

- Saskatchewan won the best of three series 2–1. The Roughriders advanced to the Grey Cup game.

ORFU Finals – Game 1
Sarnia Imperials @ Toronto Balmy Beach Beachers
| Date | Away | Home |
|---|---|---|
| November 3 | Sarnia Imperials 15 | Toronto Balmy Beach Beachers 23 |

ORFU Finals – Game 2
Toronto Balmy Beach Beachers @ Sarnia Imperials
| Date | Away | Home |
|---|---|---|
| November 10 | Toronto Balmy Beach Beachers 30 | Sarnia Imperials 41 |

- Sarnia won the total-point series by 56–53. The Imperials went on to play the Ottawa Rough Riders in the Eastern finals.

IRFU Finals – Game 1
Hamilton Tiger-Cats @ Ottawa Rough Riders
| Date | Away | Home |
|---|---|---|
| November 14 | Hamilton Tiger-Cats 7 | Ottawa Rough Riders 17 |

IRFU Finals – Game 2
Ottawa Rough Riders @ Hamilton Tiger-Cats
| Date | Away | Home |
|---|---|---|
| November 17 | Ottawa Rough Riders 11 | Hamilton Tiger-Cats 9 |

- Ottawa won the best of three series 2–0. The Rough Riders went on to play the Sarnia Imperials in the Eastern finals.

=== Eastern Finals ===
Sarnia Imperials @ Ottawa Rough Riders
| Date | Away | Home |
|---|---|---|
| November 21 | Sarnia Imperials 17 | Ottawa Rough Riders 43 |

- The Ottawa Rough Riders advanced to the Grey Cup game.

== Playoff bracket ==
Quarterfinals
IRFU | Ottawa Rough Riders | 17-11
IRFU | Hamilton Tiger Cats | 7-9
EAST
ORFU | Sarnia Imperials | 15-26
ORFU | Toronto Balmy Beach | 23-7
WIFU | Saskatchewan Roughriders
BYE
WEST
WIFU | Edmonton Eskimos | 4
WIFU | Winnipeg Blue Bombers | 1

Semifinals
IRFU | Ottawa Rough Riders | 43
ORFU | Sarnia Imperials | 17
WIFU | Saskatchewan Roughriders | 11-12-19
WIFU | Edmonton Eskimos | 15-5-18

Grey Cup final
IRFU | Ottawa Rough Riders | 21
WIFU | Saskatchewan Roughriders | 14

== Grey Cup Championship ==
November 24 39th Annual Grey Cup Game: Varsity Stadium – Toronto, Ontario
| WIFU Champion | IRFU Champion |
|---|---|
| Saskatchewan Roughriders 14 | Ottawa Rough Riders 21 |
The Ottawa Rough Riders were the 1951 Grey Cup Champions

== 1951 Interprovincial Rugby Football Union All-Stars ==
NOTE: During this time most players played both ways, so the All-Star selections do not distinguish between some offensive and defensive positions.

- QB – Bernie Custis, Hamilton Tiger-Cats
- HB – Ulysses Curtis, Toronto Argonauts
- HB – Billy Bass, Toronto Argonauts
- HB – Hal Waggoner, Hamilton Tiger-Cats
- E – Vince Mazza, Hamilton Tiger-Cats
- E – Bob Simpson, Ottawa Rough Riders
- FW – Bruce Cummings, Ottawa Rough Riders
- C – Ed Hirsch, Toronto Argonauts
- G – Ray Cicia, Montreal Alouettes
- G – Eddie Bevan, Hamilton Tiger-Cats
- T – Jack Carpenter, Hamilton Tiger-Cats
- T – Bob Gain, Ottawa Rough Riders

== 1951 Western Interprovincial Football Union All-Stars ==
NOTE: During this time most players played both ways, so the All-Star selections do not distinguish between some offensive and defensive positions.

=== 1st Team ===
- QB – Glenn Dobbs, Saskatchewan Roughriders
- HB – Tom Casey, Winnipeg Blue Bombers
- HB – Normie Kwong, Edmonton Eskimos
- FB – Mike King, Edmonton Eskimos
- E – Jack Russell, Winnipeg Blue Bombers
- E – Neil Armstrong, Winnipeg Blue Bombers
- FW – Bob Paffrath, Edmonton Eskimos
- C – Red Ettinger, Saskatchewan Roughriders
- G – Mario DeMarco, Edmonton Eskimos
- G – Bert Iannone, Saskatchewan Roughriders
- T – Martin Ruby, Saskatchewan Roughriders
- T – Buddy Tinsley, Winnipeg Blue Bombers

=== 2nd Team ===
- QB – Jack Jacobs, Winnipeg Blue Bombers
- HB – Ken Charlton, Saskatchewan Roughriders
- HB – Rollie Miles, Edmonton Eskimos
- FB – Jim Spavital, Winnipeg Blue Bombers
- FW – Bud Korchak, Winnipeg Blue Bombers
- E – Jack Nix, Saskatchewan Roughriders
- E – Rollin Prather, Edmonton Eskimos
- C – Eagle Keys, Edmonton Eskimos
- C – Bill Blackburn, Saskatchewan Roughriders
- G – Gary Deleeuw, Winnipeg Blue Bombers
- G – Jim Quondamatteo, Edmonton Eskimos
- T – Chuck Quilter, Edmonton Eskimos
- T – Dick Huffman, Winnipeg Blue Bombers

== 1951 Ontario Rugby Football Union All-Stars ==
NOTE: During this time most players played both ways, so the All-Star selections do not distinguish between some offensive and defensive positions.

- QB – George Curtis, Sarnia Imperials
- HB – Johnny Chorostecki, Sarnia Imperials
- HB – Mel Hawkrigg, McMaster University
- HB – Ralph Pulley, Toronto Balmy Beach Beachers
- HB – Al Farris, Sarnia Imperials
- HB – John Duchene, Sarnia Imperials
- E – Andy Gilmour, Toronto Balmy Beach Beachers
- E – Keith Fisher, Sarnia Imperials
- FW – John Florence, Sarnia Imperials
- C – Bruce Mattingly, Sarnia Imperials
- G – Jim Thomas, Toronto Balmy Beach Beachers
- G – Matti Ferrention, Toronto Balmy Beach Beachers
- T – Walt Bashak, McMaster University
- T – Lloyd "Dutch" Davey, Sarnia Imperials

== 1951 Canadian Football Awards ==
- Jeff Russel Memorial Trophy (IRFU MVP) – Bruce Cummings (FW), Ottawa Rough Riders
- Jeff Nicklin Memorial Trophy (WIFU MVP) - Glenn Dobbs (QB), Saskatchewan Roughriders
- Gruen Trophy (IRFU Rookie of the Year) - Bruno Bitkowski (C/DE) Ottawa Rough Riders
- Dr. Beattie Martin Trophy (WIFU Rookie of the Year) - Jim Chambers (HB), Edmonton Eskimos
- Imperial Oil Trophy (ORFU MVP) - Bruce Mattingly (C), Sarnia Imperials
