= Bruce Mattingly =

Profile
- Position: Center

Personal information
- Born: c. 1924

Career information
- College: Sarnia Collegiate Institute and Technical School

Career history
- 1946–55: Sarnia Imperials

Awards and highlights
- 5× CFL All-Star (1950, 51, 53, 54, 55); Imperial Oil Trophy (1951)

Bruce Mattingly (born c. 1924) was a centre in the Ontario Rugby Football Union, playing 10 years with the Sarnia Imperials.

A mainstay of the Sarnia offensive line, Mattingly was an all-star 5 times and won two ORFU championships. By far his best season was 1951, when he was an all-star, league champion, and to top it off, he won the Imperial Oil Trophy as MVP in the ORFU.

Though Mattingly was offered contracts by other teams, he stayed in Sarnia and played with his older brother Ray Mattingly and younger brother Don Mattingly.
