= 1955 in Canadian football =

The Edmonton Eskimos defeat the Montreal Alouettes in the first Grey Cup held in the west. This was also the first year that the Grey Cup was open to professional teams only, as the amateur Ontario Rugby Football Union was not invited to compete in an inter-union playdown, leaving only the (Eastern Canadian) Interprovincial Rugby Football Union and the (Western Canadian) Western Interprovincial Football Union to compete for the Canadian championship.

== Canadian Football News in 1955 ==
For 45 years the Grey Cup classic was an event held exclusively in the province of Ontario, with the one exception in 1931 when the game was staged in Montreal. This all changed in 1955 when the game was awarded to Vancouver, B.C. The then largest crowd in the history of organized team sports in Canada packed Empire Stadium to witness the Edmonton Eskimos defeat the Montreal Alouettes. The 39,417 in attendance remained a Grey Cup record until 1976.

The Interprovincial Rugby Football Union (IRFU) allowed the third place team to qualify for a playoff berth. The Grey Cup had a gross revenue of $198,000.

In January 1955, the Western Interprovincial Football Union (WIFU) announced that a playoff game with the Ontario Rugby Football Union (ORFU) was no longer desired. The WIFU and IRFU both scheduled their games so as not to leave an open date for the traditional game with the ORFU. At the March meeting of the CRU, the ORFU withdrew from Grey Cup competition for 1955. 1955 became the first year that only the IRFU and the WIFU competed for the Grey Cup.

Montreal's Tex Coulter became the first player to win the Most Outstanding Lineman Award.

== Regular season ==
=== Final regular season standings ===
Note: GP = Games Played, W = Wins, L = Losses, T = Ties, PF = Points For, PA = Points Against, Pts = Points

**Western Interprovincial Football Union**
Team	GP	W	L	T	PF	PA	Pts
**Edmonton Eskimos**	16	14	2	0	286	117	28
**Saskatchewan Roughriders**	16	10	6	0	270	245	20
**Winnipeg Blue Bombers**	16	7	9	0	210	195	14
BC Lions	16	5	11	0	211	330	10
Calgary Stampeders	16	4	12	0	209	299	8

**Interprovincial Rugby Football Union**
Team	GP	W	L	T	PF	PA	Pts
**Montreal Alouettes**	12	9	3	0	388	214	18
**Hamilton Tiger-Cats**	12	8	4	0	271	193	16
**Toronto Argonauts**	12	4	8	0	239	328	8
Ottawa Rough Riders	12	3	9	0	174	337	6

**Ontario Rugby Football Union**
Team	GP	W	L	T	PF	PA	Pts
**Kitchener-Waterloo Dutchmen**	12	10	1	1	284	124	21
**Sarnia Imperials**	12	6	5	1	140	182	13
Toronto Balmy Beach Beachers	12	1	11	0	101	319	2

- Bold text means that they have clinched the playoffs.
- Edmonton and Montreal both have first round byes.

== Grey Cup playoffs ==
Note: All dates in 1955

=== Semifinals ===
WIFU semifinals – game 1
Winnipeg Blue Bombers @ Saskatchewan Roughriders
Date	Away	Home
November 5	Winnipeg Blue Bombers 16	Saskatchewan Roughriders 7

WIFU semifinals – game 2
Saskatchewan Roughriders @ Winnipeg Blue Bombers
Date	Away	Home
November 7	Saskatchewan Roughriders 9	Winnipeg Blue Bombers 8

- Winnipeg won the total-point series by 24–16. The Blue Bombers will play the Edmonton Eskimos in the WIFU Finals.

IRFU semifinals
Toronto Argonauts @ Hamilton Tiger-Cats
Date	Away	Home
November 12	Toronto Argonauts 32	Hamilton Tiger-Cats 28

- The Argonauts will play the Montreal Alouettes in the Eastern finals.

=== Final ===
WIFU Finals – Game 1
Winnipeg Blue Bombers @ Edmonton Eskimos
Date	Away	Home
November 11	Winnipeg Blue Bombers 6	Edmonton Eskimos 29

WIFU Finals – Game 2
Edmonton Eskimos @ Winnipeg Blue Bombers
Date	Away	Home
November 16	Edmonton Eskimos 26	Winnipeg Blue Bombers 6

- Edmonton wins the best of three series 2–0. The Eskimos will advance to the Grey Cup game.

IRFU Finals
Toronto Argonauts @ Montreal Alouettes
Date	Away	Home
November 19	Toronto Argonauts 36	Montreal Alouettes 38

- The Alouettes will advance to the Grey Cup game.

== Playoff bracket ==
Quarterfinals
IRFU	Montreal Alouettes
IRFU	BYE
EAST
IRFU	Hamilton Tiger Cats	28
IRFU	Toronto Argonauts	32
WIFU	Edmonton Eskimos
WIFU	BYE
WEST
WIFU	Winnipeg Blue Bombers	16-8
WIFU	Saskatchewan Roughriders	7-9

Semifinals
IRFU	Montreal Alouettes	38
IRFU	Toronto Argonauts	36
WIFU	Edmonton Eskimos	29-26
WIFU	Winnipeg Blue Bombers	6-6

Grey Cup
IRFU	Montreal Alouettes	19
WIFU	Edmonton Eskimos	34

== Grey Cup Championship ==
November 26 43rd Annual Grey Cup Game: Empire Stadium – Vancouver, British Columbia
WIFU Champion	IRFU Champion
Edmonton Eskimos 34	Montreal Alouettes 19
The Edmonton Eskimos are the 1955 Grey Cup Champions

- Note: IRFU and Eastern Final dates are not confirmed, however since [1] the regular season ended October 29 in the West, and November 5 in the East, and [2] WIFU playoff dates, as well as the Grey Cup date are accurate, it is reasonable to assume the above dates are accurate.

== Canadian Football Leaders ==
- CFL passing leaders
- CFL rushing leaders
- CFL receiving leaders

== 1955 Eastern (Interprovincial Rugby Football Union) All-Stars ==
=== Offence ===
- QB – Sam Etcheverry, Montreal Alouettes
- RB – Lou Kusserow*, Hamilton Tiger-Cats
- RB – Pat Abbruzzi, Montreal Alouettes
- RB – Tom Tracy, Ottawa Rough Riders
- E – Red O'Quinn, Montreal Alouettes
- E – Al Pfeifer, Toronto Argonauts
- FW – Joey Pal, Montreal Alouettes
- C – Tommy Hugo, Montreal Alouettes
- OG – Bill Albright, Toronto Argonauts
- OG – Herb Trawick, Montreal Alouettes
- OT – Tex Coulter, Montreal Alouettes
- OT – Billy Shipp, Toronto Argonauts

=== Defence ===
- DT – Tex Coulter, Montreal Alouettes
- DT – Billy Shipp*, Toronto Argonauts
- DE – Pete Neumann, Hamilton Tiger-Cats
- DE – Doug McNichol, Montreal Alouettes
- DG – Vince Scott, Hamilton Tiger-Cats
- DG – Eddie Bevan, Hamilton Tiger-Cats
- LB – Frank Dempsey, Ottawa Rough Riders
- LB – Tommy Hugo*, Montreal Alouettes
- DB – Hal Patterson, Montreal Alouettes
- DB – Avatus Stone, Ottawa Rough Riders
- DB – John Fedosoff, Hamilton Tiger-Cats
- DB – Lou Kusserow*, Hamilton Tiger-Cats

NOTE: The following players were selected to the All-Star team as replacements for players who would have had to play both ways in the Shrine Game (denoted with an *):

- RB – Corky Tharp, Toronto Argonauts
- DT – Jim Staton, Montreal Alouettes
- LB – John Blaicher, Montreal Alouettes
- LB – Juan Sheridan, Montreal Alouettes
- DB – Bobby Simpson, Ottawa Rough Riders

=== 2nd Team Offence ===
- QB – Bob Celeri, Kitchener-Waterloo Dutchmen
- RB – Hal Patterson, Montreal Alouettes
- RB – Corky Tharp, Toronto Argonauts
- RB – Avatus Stone, Ottawa Rough Riders
- E – Doug McNichol, Montreal Alouettes
- E – Pete Neumann, Hamilton Tiger-Cats
- FW – Ron Stewart, Queen's University
- C – Frank Dempsey, Ottawa Rough Riders
- OG – Eddie Bevan, Hamilton Tiger-Cats
- OG – Vince Scott, Hamilton Tiger-Cats
- OT – Jim Hughes, Queen's University
- OT – Ray Collins, Hamilton Tiger-Cats

== 1955 Western (Western Interprovincial Football Union) All-Stars ==
=== Offence ===
- QB – Jackie Parker, Edmonton Eskimos
- RB – Ken Carpenter, Saskatchewan Roughriders
- RB – Gerry James, Winnipeg Blue Bombers
- RB – Normie Kwong, Edmonton Eskimos
- E – Stan Williams, Saskatchewan Roughriders
- E – Willie Roberts, Calgary Stampeders
- FW – Leo Lewis*, Winnipeg Blue Bombers
- C – Kurt Burris*, Edmonton Eskimos
- OG – Harry Langford*, Calgary Stampeders
- OG – Art Walker, Edmonton Eskimos
- OT – Dale Meinert, Edmonton Eskimos
- OT – Buddy Tinsley, Winnipeg Blue Bombers

=== Defence ===
- DT – Dick Huffman, Winnipeg Blue Bombers
- DT – Dale Meinert*, Edmonton Eskimos
- DE – Frank Anderson*, Edmonton Eskimos
- DE – Gordon Sturtridge, Saskatchewan Roughriders
- DG – Floyd Harraway*, Winnipeg Blue Bombers
- DG – Bob Levenhagen, British Columbia Lions
- LB – Kurt Burris, Edmonton Eskimos
- LB – Ted Tully*, Edmonton Eskimos
- DB – Rollie Miles, Edmonton Eskimos
- DB – Bobby Marlow, Saskatchewan Roughriders
- DB – Tom Casey, Winnipeg Blue Bombers
- DB – Rupe Andrews*, Edmonton Eskimos

NOTE: The following players were selected to the All-Star team as replacements for players who would have had to play both ways, or were injured, in the Shrine Game (denoted with an *):

- FW – Lynn Bottoms, Calgary Stampeders
- C – Mel Beckett, Saskatchewan Roughriders
- OG – Frank Morris, Edmonton Eskimos
- DG – Ron Atchison, Saskatchewan Roughriders
- DT – Martin Ruby, Saskatchewan Roughriders
- DE – Norm Fieldgate, British Columbia Lions
- LB – Mike King, Edmonton Eskimos
- DB – Gord Rowland, Winnipeg Blue Bombers

== 1955 Ontario Rugby Football Union All-Stars ==
NOTE: During this time most players played both ways, so the All-Star selections do not distinguish between some offensive and defensive positions.

- QB – Bob Celeri, Kitchener-Waterloo Dutchmen
- RB – Cookie Gilchrist, Kitchener-Waterloo Dutchmen
- RB – John Jacobs, Sarnia Imperials
- RB – Sam Laverty, Toronto Balmy Beach Beachers
- E – Eric Graham, Sarnia Imperials
- E – Gerry McTaggart, Kitchener-Waterloo Dutchmen
- FW – Carl Totzke, Kitchener-Waterloo Dutchmen
- C – Bruce Mattingly, Sarnia Imperials
- OG – Ed Stowe, Sarnia Imperials
- OG – Larry Cardonick, Sarnia Imperials
- OT – Jay Fry, Kitchener-Waterloo Dutchmen
- OT – Oatten Fisher, Toronto Balmy Beach Beachers
- OT – Jim Burr, Sarnia Imperials

== 1955 Canadian Football Awards ==
- Most Outstanding Player Award – Pat Abbruzzi (RB), Montreal Alouettes
- Most Outstanding Canadian Award – Normie Kwong (RB), Edmonton Eskimos
- Outstanding Lineman Award – Tex Coulter (OT/DT), Montreal Alouettes
- Jeff Russel Memorial Trophy (IRFU MVP) – Avatus Stone (DB), Ottawa Rough Riders
- Jeff Nicklin Memorial Trophy (WIFU MVP) - Ken Carpenter (RB), Saskatchewan Roughriders
- Gruen Trophy (IRFU Rookie of the Year) - Ed Mularchyk (E), Ottawa Rough Riders
- Dr. Beattie Martin Trophy (WIFU Rookie of the Year) - Harry Lunn (HB), Saskatchewan Roughriders
- Imperial Oil Trophy (ORFU MVP) - Bob Celeri - Kitchener-Waterloo Dutchmen
