= Loyola High School v Quebec AG =

Canadian Supreme Court case

- Supreme Court of Canada

Hearing: March 24, 2014 Judgment: March 19, 2015
- Citations: 2015 SCC 12, [2015] 1 SCR 613
- Ruling: Appeal upheld

Holding
- The Minister’s decision requiring that all aspects of Loyola’s proposed program be taught from a neutral perspective, including the teaching of Catholicism, limited freedom of religion more than was necessary given the statutory objectives. As a result, it did not reflect a proportionate balancing and should be set aside... There is unquestionably a role for the Minister to examine proposed programs on a case-by-case basis to ensure that they adequately further the objectives and competencies of the ERC Program. In certain cases, the result may be that the religious freedoms of private schools are subject to justifiable limitations. Here, however, the Minister adopted a definition of equivalency that essentially read this meaningful individualized approach out of the legislative and regulatory scheme. By using as her starting point the premise that only a secular approach to teaching the ERC Program can suffice as equivalent, the protection contemplated by the exemption provision at issue was rendered illusory.

Court membership

Reasons given
- Majority: Abella J, joined by LeBel, Cromwell and Karakatsanis JJ
- Concurrence: McLachlin CJ and Moldaver J, joined by Rothstein J

Loyola v Quebec AG, 2015 SCC 12, [2015] 1 SCR 613 is a Supreme Court of Canada decision on the topics of Canadian administrative law, of judicial review, of standard of review and of ministerial discretion. The decision is notable for upholding a school’s freedom of religion in a secular state, which sought to restrict it.

== Summary ==
In 2008 Paul Donovan, the principal of a Jesuit Catholic high school in Quebec, objected to a government mandated course on religion and ethics. Begun in September 2008, the Ethics and religious culture course (ERC as it is called) is a provincially mandated course that requires schools to teach the basic traditions and symbolisms of a variety of religions.

Donovan argued on behalf of Loyola High School that the ERC forbids teachers from teaching, in detail, the reasons why a given religious faith believes what it does believe; any form of instruction that could be perceived as an endorsement of a particular religion or proclaiming it as truth is prohibited and therefore seen by Donovan as a violation of religious freedom, as outlined in the Quebec Charter of Values. An additional concern is that government imposed religious and ethical curricula on institutions like Loyola, could be precedent-setting for government control on other faith based institutions such as churches and associated religious organizations.

All schools in Quebec, including religious, private schools, and home schools are obliged by the law to offer the ERC. If faith based schools want to continue their traditional faith education, they are permitted to do so, however it must be in addition to but separate from the ERC. This is viewed by the law's opponents as closed secularism, as opposed to open secularism, and a perversion of the proper understanding of pluralism and, of most concern, a breach of their right to teach the faith.

== Courts below ==
A Quebec Superior Court agreed with the school's position in 2010, On June 18, 2010, Justice Gerard Dugré compared the attempt of the education minister to impose a secular emphasis on Loyola High School's teaching of the course to the intolerance of the Spanish Inquisition. Dugré J wrote in his 63-page decision that:

The obligation imposed on Loyola to teach the ethics and religious culture course in a lay fashion assumes a totalitarian character essentially equivalent to Galileo's being ordered by the Inquisition to deny the Copernican universe.

In 2012, the Quebec Court of Appeal sided with the government.

== Supreme Court of Canada ==
On further appeal the Supreme Court of Canada held that the Minister's decision to force the teaching of Catholicism from a neutral standpoint unreasonably violated religious freedom, and was sent back to the Minister for reconsideration. In a stunning departure from the majority, the dissenters wrote that "the only constitutional response to Loyola’s application for an exemption would be to grant it."

== See also ==
- S.L. v Commission scolaire des Chênes
- List of Supreme Court of Canada cases
