= Laganière =

Laganière is a surname. Notable people with the surname include:

- Antoine Laganière (born 1990), Canadian ice hockey player
- Brigitte Laganière (born 1996), Canadian ice hockey player
- Carole Laganière (1959–2023), Canadian film director
