= St. Ignatius of Loyola Church (Montreal) =

Coordinates: 45.457672°N 73.642527°W

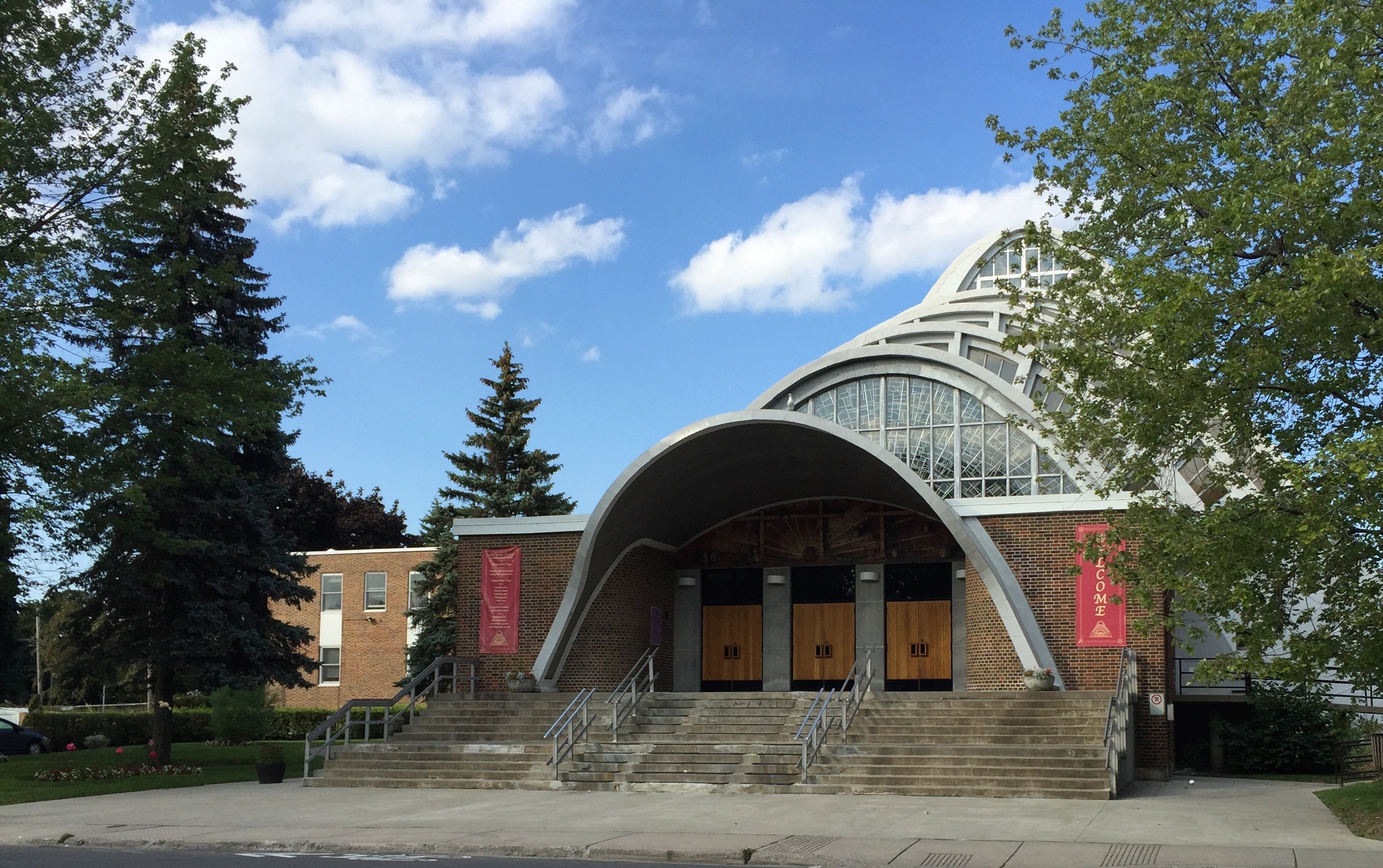
- Church entrance

- Location in Montreal
- Location: Notre-Dame-de-Grâce, Montreal West
- Country: Canada
- Denomination: Roman Catholic
- Website: stig.ca

History
- Status: Active
- Founded: 1917
- Founder: Society of Jesus
- Dedication: Ignatius of Loyola

Architecture
- Functional status: Parish church
- Completed: 1966

St. Ignatius Church is a Roman Catholic Parish church in Notre-Dame-de-Grâce, Montreal West, Quebec. It was founded by the Society of Jesus in 1917 as an English-speaking parish. It is next to Loyola High School and the Loyola Campus of Concordia University.

== History ==
In 1896, Loyola College was founded by English-speaking Canadian Jesuits. It was the English-speaking section of Collège Sainte-Marie de Montréal and split off to become its own institution.

In 1917, the parish of St. Ignatius was started for the local English, Welsh, Scottish and Irish population in the area. Masses were held on the campus of Loyola College.

In 1964, Loyola High School separated from the college. In 1966, a new church was built as a separate structure apart from the college. In 1968 discussions begun to merge Loyola College with other colleges. This resulted with the creation of Concordia University on 24 August 1974.

In 1982, Loyola High School moved to new building and the Jesuits handed over administration of the church to the Archdiocese of Montreal who continue to serve the parish.

== Ignatian Centre ==
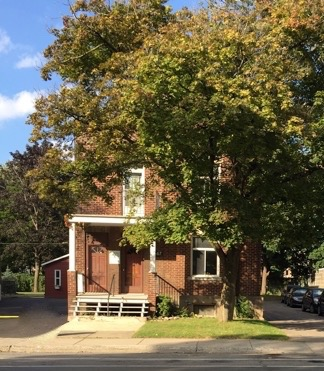
Ignatian Centre

Next to the church is the Ignatian Centre. The building itself dates back to 1910. St. Ignatius church is situated in what used to be the house's garden. It was the first building on West Broadway Street. After the First World War the Jesuits bought the building as a residence for teachers on the upper floor and an elementary school on the ground floor.

With the merger of Loyola College to form Concordia University, the building ceased to have a purpose. In 1976, the Auxiliary Bishop of the Archdiocese of Montreal, Leonard Crowley asked the English-speaking Jesuits to create a spirituality centre and promoted the benefits of spiritual direction to local the English-speaking population. That year, the house was renovated at a cost of $40,000 to turn it into a spirituality centre.

The centre offers prayers guides, direction in Ignatian spirituality and a 'daily life' program. It is the main English-speaking centre for Ignatian spirituality in Montreal.

== Parish ==
The church has three Masses on weekends; at 4:30pm on Saturday afternoon, and at 10:00am on Sunday morning and 5:00pm Sunday evenings. There are weekday Masses at 9:00am on Wednesday and Thursday, and at 6:30pm on Tuesday.

== See also ==
- List of Jesuit sites
- Loyola High School
