= Concordia Stingers women's ice hockey =

Canadian university ice hockey team

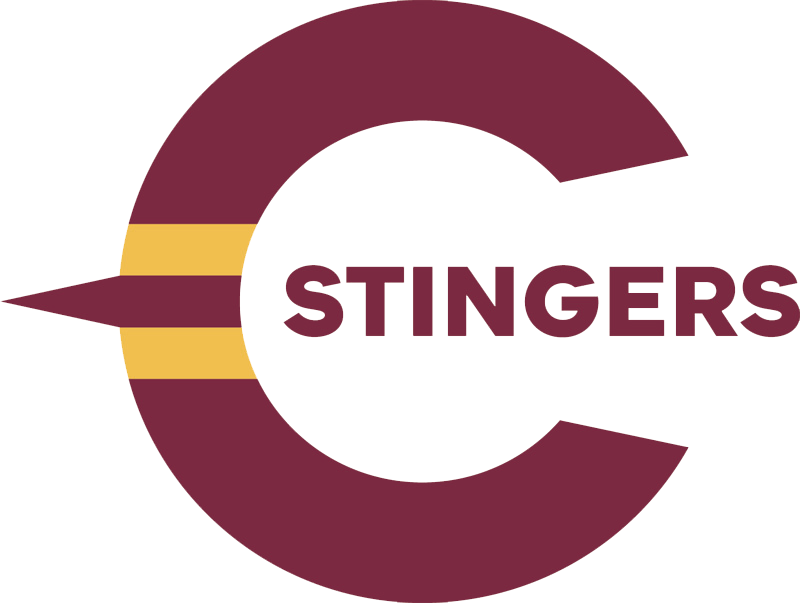
- University: Concordia University (Quebec)
- Conference: RSEQ
- Head coach: Julie Chu; Since 2015–16 season
- Assistant coaches: Caroline Ouellette (assoc. HC); Dave Singh; Devon Thompson; Lauriane Rougeau; Olivier Gervais
- Arena: Ed Meagher Arena; Montreal, Quebec
- Colors: Burgundy, Yellow, and White

U Sports tournament champions
- 1998, 1999, 2022, 2024

U Sports tournament appearances
- 1998, 1999, 2000, 2001, 2002, 2005, 2017, 2018, 2022, 2023, 2024, 2025, 2026

Conference tournament champions
- 1981, 1982, 1983, 1987, 1989, 1990, 1991, 1992, 1993, 1996, 1997, 1998, 1999, 2000, 2001, 2002, 2005, 2018, 2026

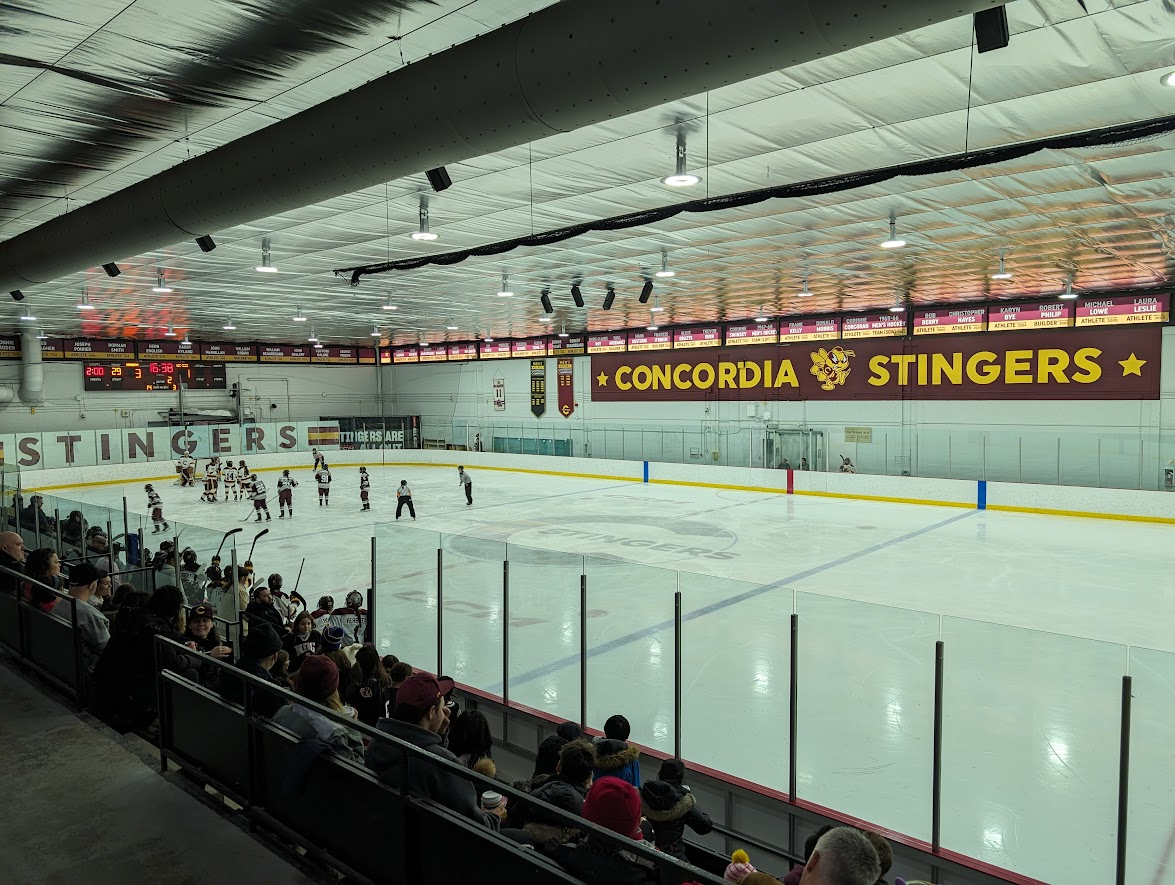
Ed Meagher Arena during a Stingers game in February 2024

The Concordia Stingers women's ice hockey program represents Concordia University in Montreal, Quebec in the sport of ice hockey in the Réseau du sport étudiant du Québec (RSEQ) conference of U Sports. The Stingers have won nineteen RSEQ conference championships and four U Sports national championships, in 1998, 1999, 2022, and 2024.

== History ==
The Concordia Stingers women's ice hockey team earned varsity status in 1975, ensuring that they received financial support from the university.

After playing for the Providence Friars women's ice hockey program and without any NCAA eligibility remaining, Cammi Granato moved to Montreal to earn her master's degree in sports administration at Concordia University. In 123 games, Granato scored 178 goals and 148 assists for 326 points, and was instrumental in Concordia capturing three consecutive provincial championships.

In the 1997–98 season of Canadian Intercollegiate Athletic Union (CIAU; renamed CIS in 2001 and U Sports in 2016) women's ice hockey, the Stingers won their first national championship, which was held at Concordia.

In the 2000 semi-finals, the Stingers were bested by the Alberta Pandas by a 4–3 tally. That year, the Stingers took third place. In the 2000–01 season, Stingers player Lisa-Marie Breton was the conference scoring leader, with eight goals and six assists in just six RSEQ games.

The team is coached by four-time Olympic medallist Julie Chu, after former coach Les Lawton accumulated more than 500 victories as Stingers head coach before stepping down due to health issues.

Erica Porter, who played five years with the Stingers (2011–2016) and earned academic All-Canadian honors in each year, was among eighteen former student-athletes selected for the 2021 U Sports Female Apprentice Coach Program. The program is geared towards increasing the number of women in coaching positions across Canadian universities and involves pairing apprentice coaches with a mentor head coach. Porter was she mentored by Concordia coaches Julie Chu and Caroline Ouellette.

The Stingers completed a perfect regular season in 2023–24, with 25 wins and 0 losses.

== Exhibition ==
Date	Opponent	Score
December 4, 2003	China national women's team	7–2

== National championships ==
Year	Winner	Score	Runner-up
1998	Concordia Stingers	4–1	Toronto Lady Blues
1999	Concordia Stingers	2–0	Alberta Pandas
2022	Concordia Stingers	4–0	Nipissing Lakers
2024	Concordia Stingers	3–1	Toronto Varsity Blues

=== U Sports Tournament results ===
Year	Seed	Round	Opponent	Result
2017	#7	First Round; Semi-Finals; Bronze Medal Game	#2 Guelph #6 Alberta #1 UBC	W 4–3; L 2–1; L 2–0
2018	#4	First Round; Semi-Finals; Bronze Medal Game	#5 St. Francis Xavier #1 Manitoba #7 Saskatchewan	W 8–1; L 2–1; W4–2
2022	#1	First Round; Semi-Finals; Gold Medal Game	#8 UPEI #5 Saskatchewan #6 Nipissing	W 7–0; W 2–0; W 4–0
2023	#3	First Round; Semi-Finals; Gold Medal Game	#6 Nipissing #2 UBC #8 Mount Royal	W 5-1; W 3-1; L 4–3
2024	#1	First Round; Semi-Finals; Gold Medal Game	#8 Saskatchewan #4 Waterloo #6 Toronto	W 4-0; W 3-1; W 3-1

== International ==
Player	Position	Nation	Event	Result
Erin Lally	Forward	Canada	25th Winter Universiade	Gold
Cecilia Anderson	Goaltender	Sweden	2005 IIHF Women's World Championship	Bronze
Jordyn Verbeek	Goaltender	Canada	2025 Winter World University Games	Silver
Alexandra Anne Boyer	Defense	Canada	2025 Winter World University Games	Silver
Émilie Lavoie	Forward	Canada	2025 Winter World University Games	Silver
Emilie Lussier	Defense	Canada	2025 Winter World University Games	Silver

=== Olympics ===
The following Stingers alumni have participated in ice hockey at the Winter Olympics.

Player	Position	Nation	Event	Result
Therese Brisson	Defense	Canada	1998 Winter Olympics	Silver
Therese Brisson	Defense	Canada	2002 Winter Olympics	Gold
Karyn Bye	Forward	United States	1998 Winter Olympics	Gold
Cammi Granato	Forward	United States	1998 Winter Olympics	Gold
Caroline Ouellette	Forward	Canada	2002 Winter Olympics	Gold
Caroline Ouellette	Forward	Canada	2006 Winter Olympics	Gold
Cecilia Anderson	Goaltender	Sweden	2006 Winter Olympics	Silver
Caroline Ouellette	Forward	Canada	2010 Winter Olympics	Gold
Alice Philbert	Goaltender	France	2026 Winter Olympics	Fifth place, Group B
Emma Nonnenmacher	Forward	France	2026 Winter Olympics	Fifth place, Group B

== Awards and honours ==
- TSN Award: Karen Kendall, 1998
- Concordia Director Shield: Cecilia Anderson, 2006

=== RSEQ Awards ===
RSEQ was known as the Fédération Québécoise du Sport Étudiant (FSSQ)/Quebec Student Sport Federation (QSSF) until 2010.

==== Player of the Year ====
- 1999–2000: Corinne Swirsky
- 2001–02: Marie-Claude Allard
- 2004–05: Cecilia Anderson
- 2010–11: Audrey Doyon-Lessard
- 2019–20: Rosalie Bégin-Cyr
- 2025-26: Jessymaude Drapeau

==== Rookie of the Year ====
- 2000–01: Roxanne Dupuis
- 2001–02: Dominique Rancour
- 2003–04: Cecilia Anderson
- 2004–05: Sandy Roy
- 2014–15: Katherine Purchase
- 2017–18: Lidia Fillion
- 2018–19: Rosalie Bégin-Cyr
- 2019–20: Emmy Fecteau
- 2021–22: Émilie Lavoie

==== Coach of the Year ====
- 1997–98: Les Lawton
- 1998–99: Les Lawton
- 1999–2000: Les Lawton
- 2000–01: Les Lawton
- 2001–02: Les Lawton
- 2004–05: Les Lawton
- 2014–15: Les Lawton
- 2016–17: Julie Chu
- 2019–20: Julie Chu
- 2021–22: Julie Chu
- 2023–24: Julie Chu

==== Leadership and Social Engagement Award ====
The winner of the RSEQ Leadership and Social Engagement Award represents the conference as a finalist for the U Sports Marion Hilliard Award.

- 1997–98: Karen Kendall
- 1998–99: Jessika Audet
- 2001–02: Lauren Houghton
- 2003–04: Janna Gillis
- 2013–14: Jaymee Shell
- 2021–22: Brigitte Laganière
- 2023–24: Emmy Fecteau

==== RSEQ All-Stars ====
- 1997–98: Jessika Audet (G), Delaney Collins (D), Anne Rodrigue (F), Corinne Swirsky (F)
- 1998–99: Kari Colpitts (F), Geneviève Fagnan (D), Corinne Swirsky (F)

First Team

- 1999–2000: Annie Boucher (F), Geneviève Fagnan (D), Corinne Swirsky (F)
- 2000–01: Marie-Claude Allard (F), Lisa-Marie Breton (F)
- 2001–02: Marie-Claude Allard (F), Suzanne Kaye (D)
- 2002–03: Marie-Claude Allard (F), Suzanne Kaye (D), Dominique Rancour (F)
- 2003–04: Cecilia Anderson (G), Catherine De Abreau (F), Roxanne Dupuis (D), Dominique Rancour (F)
- 2004–05: Cecilia Anderson (G), Roxanne Dupuis (D), Dominique Rancour (F)
- 2005–06: Marie-Pier Cantin-Drouin (D), Dominique Rancour (F)
- 2014–15: Marie-Joëlle Allard (D)
- 2016–17: Caroll-Ann Gagné (D)
- 2017–18: Marie-Joëlle Allard (D)
- 2018–19: Audrey Belzile (F), Claudia Fortin (F)
- 2019–20: Rosalie Bégin-Cyr (F), Audrey Belzile (F), Brigitte Laganiere (D)
- 2021–22: Brigitte Laganière (D), Stéphanie Lalancette (F)
- 2022–23: Alice Philbert (G), Emmy Fecteau (F)
- 2023–24: Arianne Leblanc (G), Émilie Lussier (F)
- 2025-26: Jessymaude Drapeau (F)

Second Team

- 1999–2000: Lisa-Marie Breton (F), Lisa Herritt (G)
- 2000–01: Lisa Herritt (G), Suzanne Kaye (D)
- 2001–02: Jessica Anderson (G), Lisa-Marie Breton (F), Roxanne Dupuis (D), Dominique Rancour (F)
- 2002–03: Jessica Anderson (G)
- 2003–04: Marie-Pier Cantin-Drouin (D), Anouk Grignon-L'Anglais (F)
- 2004–05: Marie-Pier Cantin-Drouin (D), Jodi Gosse (F)
- 2006–07: Andrea Dolan (F)
- 2007–08: Angela Di Stasi (F)
- 2010–11: Audrey Doyon-Lessard (G), Erin Lally (F)
- 2014–15: Katherine Purchase (G)
- 2015–16: Caroll-Ann Gagné (D)
- 2016–17: Marie-Joëlle Allard (D), Claudia Dubois (F)
- 2017–18: Audrey Belzile (F), Claudia Dubois (F)
- 2018–19: Brigitte Laganière (D)
- 2019–20: Claudia Dubois (F), Alexandra Nikolikdakis (D)
- 2021–22: Rosalie Bégin-Cyr (F), Audrey Belzile (F), Marie-Pascale Bernier (F), Alice Philbert (G)
- 2022–23: Rosalie Bégin-Cyr (F), Alexandra-Anne Boyer (D), Émilie Lavoie (F), Léonie Philbert (F)
- 2023–24: Emmy Fecteau (F), Émilie Lavoie (F), Léonie Philbert (F)

All-Rookie Team

- 2010–11: Alyssa Sherrard (F)
- 2013–14: Marie-Joëlle Allard (F)
- 2014–15: Katherine Purchase (G), Devon Thompson (F)
- 2016–17: Audrey Belzile (F), Brigitte Laganière (D), Alexandra Nikolidakis (D)
- 2017–18: Lidia Fillion (F)
- 2018–19: Rosalie Bégin-Cyr (F), Sandrine Lavictoire (D)
- 2019–20: Emmy Fecteau (F)
- 2021–22: Émilie Lavoie (F), Chloé Gendreau (F)

Source: RSEQ

=== U Sports Awards ===
==== Athlete of the Year ====
The Lois and Doug Mitchell U Sports Athletes of the Year Awards recognize the top male and female athletes competing in university athletics within U Sports.

- 1998–99: Corinne Swirsky

==== Brodrick Trophy ====
The Brodrick Trophy is awarded to the player of the year in U Sports women's ice hockey.

- 1997–98: Corinne Swirsky
- 1998–99: Corinne Swirsky
- 1999–2000: Corinne Swirsky
- 2025-26: Jessymaude Drapeau

==== Rookie of the Year ====
- 2003–04: Cecilia Anderson

==== Coach of the Year ====
- 1999–2000: Les Lawton
- 2023–24: Julie Chu

==== Marion Hilliard Award ====
The Marion Hilliard Award recognizes an outstanding student-athlete who has demonstrated excellence in ice hockey, academics, and community involvement.

- 1997–98: Karen Kendall
- 2001–02: Lauren Houghton
- 2003–04: Janna Gillis
- 2023–24: Emmy Fecteau

==== All-Canadians ====
All-Canadian honours are awarded by U Sports to the all-stars of the regular season.

First Team

- 1997–98: Delaney Collins (D), Corinne Swirsky (F)
- 1998–99: Geneviève Fagnan (D), Corinne Swirsky (F)
- 1999–2000: Corinne Swirsky (F)
- 2000–01: Lisa-Marie Breton (F)
- 2001–02: Marie-Claude Allard (F), Suzanne Kaye (D)
- 2002–03: Suzanne Kaye (D)
- 2003–04: Cecilia Anderson (G)
- 2004–05: Roxanne Dupuis (F)
- 2019–20: Rosalie Bégin-Cyr (F)
- 2021–22: Brigitte Laganière (D)
- 2025-26: Jessymaude Drapeau (F)

Second Team

- 1997–98: Anne Rodrigue (F)
- 2002–03: Marie-Claude Allard (F)
- 2003–04: Dominique Rancour (F)
- 2004–05: Cecilia Anderson (G)
- 2016–17: Carol-Ann Gagné (D)
- 2017–18: Lidia Fillion (F)
- 2018–19: Claudia Fortin (D)
- 2019-20: Brigitte Laganière (D)
- 2021–22: Stéphanie Lalancette (F)
- 2022–23: Emmy Fecteau (F)
- 2023–24: Émilie Lussier (F)

All-Rookie

The U Sports All-Rookie team recognizes outstanding first year players in the regular season. Teams have been selected since the 2003–04 season.

- 2003–04: Cecilia Anderson (G)
- 2004–05: Sandy Roy (D)
- 2014–15: Katherine Purchase (G)
- 2016–17: Alexandra Nikolidakis (D)
- 2019–20: Emmy Fecteau (F)
- 2021–22: Émilie Lavoie (F)
- 2023–24: Émilie Lussier (F)

==== Championship MVP ====
- 1998: Corinne Swirsky
- 2022: Stéphanie Lalancette
- 2024: Jessymaude Drapeau

==== Championship All-Star Team ====
- 1998: Anne Rodrigue (F)
- 1999: Geneviève Fagnan (D), Anne Rodrigue (F)
- 2000: Geneviève Fagnan (D), Corinne Swirsky (F)
- 2001: Caroline Ouellette (F)
- 2002: Dominique Rancour (F)
- 2018: Marie-Joëlle Allard (D)
- 2022: Audrey Belzile (F), Stéphanie Lalancette (F), Alice Philbert (G)
- 2023: Rosalie Bégin-Cyr (F)
- 2024: Jessymaude Drapeau (F), Léonie Philbert (F), Jordyn Verbeek (G)
- 2025: Jessymaude Drapeau (F)

=== Concordia University Awards ===
- Michael Di Grappa Award of Distinction for career contribution to the Stingers: Claudia Dubois, 2020

==== Sally Kemp Award ====
The Sally Kemp award is presented to the most outstanding female athlete at Concordia University.

- 1975–76: Marjorie Ross
- 1979–80: Denise Bienvenu
- 1981–82: Corinne Corcoran
- 1983–84: Maureen Maloney
- 1987–88: Thérèse Brisson
- 1988–89: Thérèse Brisson
- 1989–90: Annie Caron
- 1990–91: Laura Leslie
- 1991–92: Marie-Claude Roy
- 1994–95: Cammi Granato
- 1996–97: Corinne Swirsky
- 1997–98: Corinne Swirsky
- 1998–99: Corinne Swirsky
- 2000–01: Lisa-Marie Breton
- 2002–03: Marie-Claude Allard
- 2004–05: Cecilia Anderson
- 2019–20: Rosalie Bégin-Cyr
- 2021–22: Stéphanie Lalancette
- 2022–23: Emmy Fecteau

==== Laurie Brodrick Award ====
The Laurie Brodrick Award is presented to the most outstanding female student-athlete at Concordia University who is competing in her first year of eligibility in a varsity sport.

- 1980–81: Corinne Corcoran
- 1982–83: Suzanne Flynn
- 1985–86: Janice MacDougall
- 1986–87: Thérèse Brisson
- 1988–89: Sophie Drolet
- 1994–95: Kari Colpitts
- 1995–96: Corinne Swirsky
- 1997–98: Deana Huyghebaert
- 1999–2000: Catherine De Abreu
- 2003–04: Cecilia Anderson
- 2004–05: Sandy Roy
- 2007–08: Alynn Doiron
- 2014–15: Katherine Purchase
- 2017–18: Lidia Fillion
- 2019–20: Emmy Fecteau
- 2021–22: Émilie Lavoie

==== Fittest Female Athlete ====
- 1991–92: Val Gaston
- 1993–94: Ginnie Brule & Karyn Bye
- 1994–95: Karyn Bye
- 1995–96: Anne Rodrigue
- 1996–97: Catherine Bertrand
- 1997–98: Catherine Bertrand
- 1998–99: Lisa-Marie Breton
- 1999–2000: Lisa-Marie Breton
- 2000–01: Lisa-Marie Breton
- 2001–02: Lisa-Marie Breton
- 2002–03: Roxanne Dupuis
- 2003–04: Marie-Pier Cantin-Drouin
- 2004–05: Marie-Pier Cantin-Drouin
- 2005–06: Marie-Pier Cantin-Drouin
- 2006–07: Sophie Beaudry
- 2007–08: Meggy Hatin-Léveillée
- 2009–10: Catherine Rancourt
- 2010–11: Catherine Rancourt
- 2012–13: Audrey Morand
- 2013–14: Audrey Morand
- 2014–15: Audrey Morand
- 2017–18: Melinda Prévost
- 2018–19: Melinda Prévost

==== Denise Beaudet Award ====
The Denise Beaudet Award is presented to the Concordia female student-athlete who best exemplifies outstanding achievement in the areas of academics, athletics, and community involvement.

- 1985–86: Paddy Maloney
- 1987–88: Christine Beaulieu
- 1988–89: Lisa Morgan
- 1989–90: Sue Prosser
- 1998–99: Kari Colpitts
- 1999–2000: Jessika Audet
- 2001–02: Lauren Houghton
- 2002–03: Suzanne Kaye
- 2003–04: Janna Gillis
- 2011–12: Maggie MacNeil
- 2012–13: Jaymee Shell
- 2013–14: Jaymee Shell
- 2014–15: Danielle Scarlett
- 2018–19: Brigitte Laganière
- 2021–22: Brigitte Laganière
- 2022–23: Emmy Fecteau

==== Sports Hall of Fame ====
The Concordia University Sports Hall of Fame honours student-athletes, builders, and teams that made outstanding contributions to sports at Concordia University, Loyola College, and/or Sir George Williams University.

Inductee	Category	Year inducted
Diane Quart	Athlete	1983
Laurie Brodrick	Athlete	1995
Thérèse Brisson	Athlete	1997
Theresa Humes	Builder	1997
Marie-Claude Roy	Athlete	1999
Corinne Swirsky	Athlete	2001
Corinne Corcoran	Athlete	2003
Karyn Bye	Athlete	2004
Laura Leslie	Athlete	2005
Patricia Chiara	Athlete	2006
1973–74 Loyola Tommies women's hockey team	Team	2008
Cammi Granato	Athlete	2009
1995–96 Concordia Stingers women's hockey team	Team	2009
Maureen Maloney	Athlete	2015
1980–81 Concordia Stingers women's hockey team	Team	2015
Lisa-Marie Breton-Lebreux	Athlete	2018
1997–98 Concordia Stingers women's hockey team	Team	2018
Les Lawton	Builder	2022

=== Hockey Hall of Fame ===
Player	Year inducted
Cammi Granato	2010

== Stingers in pro hockey ==
= CWHL All-Star	= NWHL All-Star	= Clarkson Cup Champion	= Isobel Cup Champion

Player	Position	Team(s)	League(s)	Years	Titles
Delaney Collins	Defense	Brampton Thunder	CWHL		
Angela DiStasi		Mississauga Chiefs	CWHL		
Kelly Sudia		Montreal Stars	CWHL	5	2009 Clarkson Cup; 2011 Clarkson Cup; 2012 Clarkson Cup
Lisa-Marie Breton	Forward	Montreal Stars	CWHL		2009 Clarkson Cup; 2011 Clarkson Cup; 2012 Clarkson Cup; 2017 Clarkson Cupas asst. coach
Donna Ringrose		Montreal Stars	CWHL		
Tawnya Danis		Montreal Stars	CWHL		
