= Ed Meagher Arena =

Ice hockey venue in Montreal, Quebec, Canada

Coordinates: 45.4567°N 73.6376°W

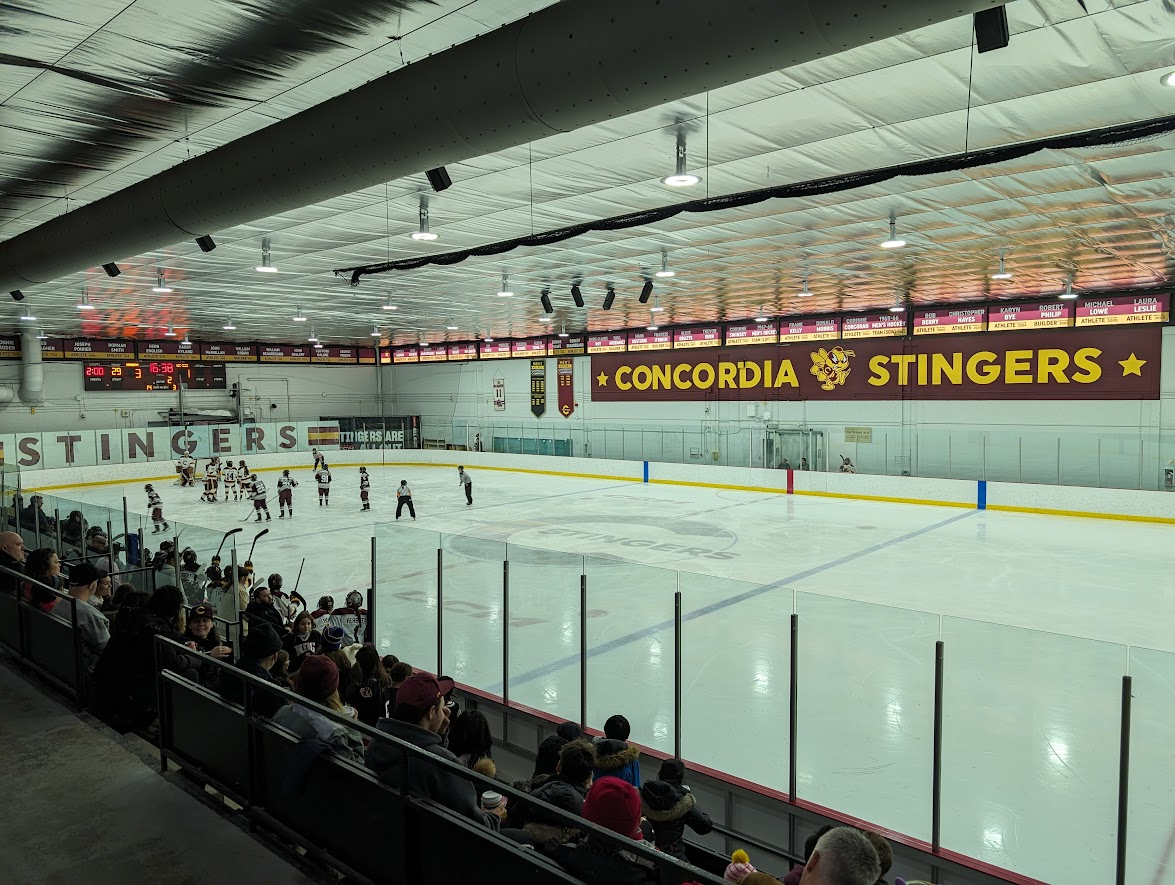
Ed Meagher Arena, circa 2024.

Ed Meagher Arena is an indoor ice hockey arena in the Notre-Dame-de-Grâce neighbourhood of Montreal, Quebec. It is the home arena for the Concordia Stingers women's and men's ice hockey teams. Opening in 1967, the arena was originally known as Loyola Arena. In 2000, it was renamed for Ed Meagher, who was an alumnus of Loyola College and the school's longtime athletic director. In 2012, it was announced that the arena would undergo a $6.5 million upgrade, funded jointly by the Quebec government and Concordia University. In 2013, the arena underwent renovations including the addition of a new rink surface that conforms to National Hockey League specifications.

It was home to the Montreal Jofa Titan of the National Women's Hockey League for the 1998–99 season.
