= Audrey Doyon-Lessard =

Canadian ice hockey player

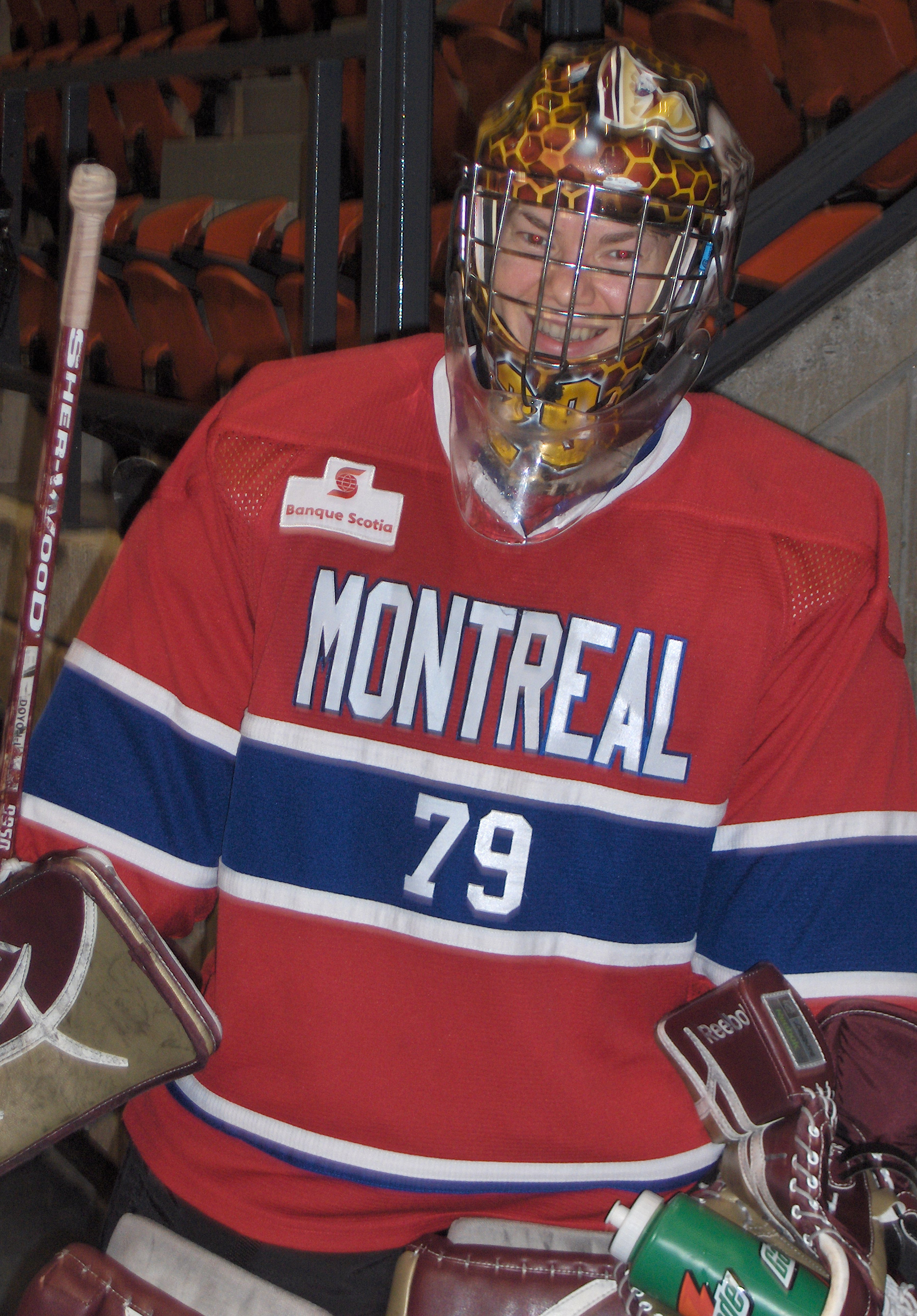
- Audrey Doyon-Lessard
- Born: November 5, 1986 (age 39) Charny, Quebec, Canada
- Height: 5 ft 5 in (165 cm)
- Position: Goaltender
- Caught: Left
- Played for: Les Canadiennes de Montreal; Concordia Stingers
- Playing career: 2006–2012

Audrey Doyon-Lessard (born 5 November 1986) is a Canadian retired ice hockey goaltender and goaltending coach.

== Life ==
She was born in the Charny district of Lévis, Quebec, Canada in 1986. Nicknamed Audj, she began playing hockey at the age of 7 and played with boys until the age of 14, including several years in amateur hockey.

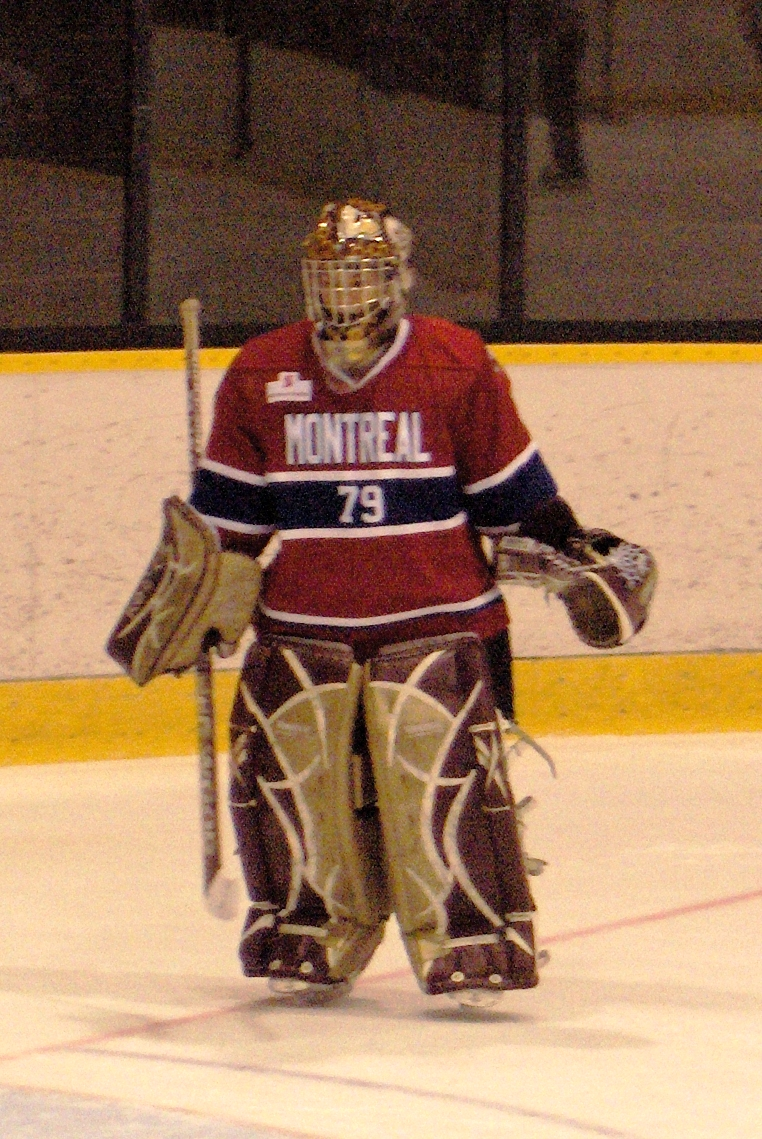
Doyon-Lessard in 2011

She was a sports-science student at Cardinal-Roy high school. She later played with the Blues from Dawson College in the AA College Women's Hockey League. Doyon-Lessard played two seasons (2004–05 and 2005–06) for the Blues at Dawson College, and for five years (2006 to 2011) she played in the Canadian university championship with the Concordia Stingers. In the 2010-11 season, Doyon-Lessard posted an average of 2.74 goals and an average of 0.924 of stoppages (facing no less than 723 shots). In 20 games, she helped the Stingers rank third in the university championship with a record of eight wins and nine losses. In 20 games, she helped the Stingers rank third in the university championship with a record of eight wins and nine losses.

In 2011–12, her first season with the Montreal Stars in the Canadian Women's Hockey League, she finished the season with a record 3.00 having played a single match

== Honours ==
- Nominated 2011 Quebec Student Sports Network (RSEQ) hockey player of the year 4.
- Elected to the first All-Star Team RSEQ (2010–11)
- Named by Concordia University, the most valuable female hockey player (2009–10 and 2010–11)
- Receives the 2011 Michael Di Grappa Award for his career contribution with the Stingers.

== Personal ==
Off-ice, she studied sports therapy.
