= Ralph Toohy =

Canadian football player (1926–1998)

Profile
- Position: End

Personal information
- Born: October 9, 1926
- Died: July 19, 1998 (aged 71)

Career information
- College: Colorado College

Career history
- 1947–51: Montreal Alouettes
- 1952–58: Hamilton Tiger-Cats

Awards and highlights
- 3× Grey Cup champion (1949, 1953, 1957); 4× CFL All-Star (1948, 49, 50, 53)

Ralph Toohy (October 6, 1926 – July 19, 1998) was a Grey Cup champion and all-star Canadian Football League player. He played offensive and defensive end.

Toohy played football with Loyola High School and later attended Colorado College. He began his pro career in 1947 with the Montreal Alouettes and was part of the Larks first Grey Cup championship. He played 59 games for the Als over 5 seasons and was selected as an all-star in 1948, '49 and '50. He later played another 6 seasons with the Hamilton Tiger-Cats, where he won the Grey Cup in 1953 and 1957, and was an all-star at linebacker in 1953. Toohy was always a fan favourite, for booing, nicknamed "Ralph the Terrible". He later married Theresa Lyons and settled in Hamilton, with their five children, running a trucking company. He died in 1998.
