= Charles William Kelsey =

Canadian artist

- Born: 1877; England
- Died: 1975 (aged 97–98)
- Education: England
- Known for: stained glass artist

Charles William Kelsey (1877–1975) was a Canadian artist best known for his stained glass work. He was born in 1877 in England. He trained in England. He emigrated to Montreal, Quebec, in 1922. He designed and painted stained glass windows with the Montreal Art Glass Works.

== Works ==
His stained glass designs can be found in England, Australia, the United States and in over sixty-eight churches in Canada. His main patrons were the Anglican and United Churches.

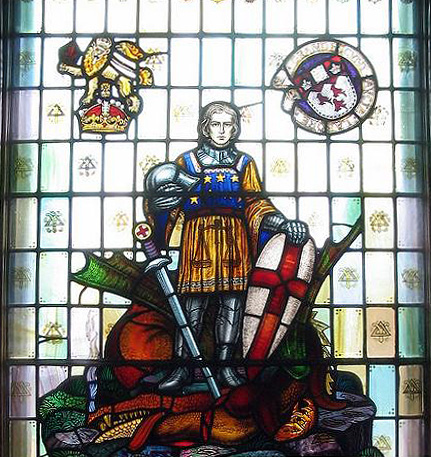
A war memorial window (1950) by Charles William Kelsey in the McGill University War Memorial Hall depicts St. Michael and the dragon, c.1950

- In Memorial Hall, McGill University, there are two Stained Glass Regimental badge World War I and World War II Memorial Windows by Charles William Kelsey c. 1950/1.
- The torture of the eight North American Martyrs by North American Indians are the subjects depicted in the twelve-light World War I memorial window (1933) by Charles William Kelsey at the Loyola College (Montreal) chapel.
- The three light congregational war memorial window (1949) by Charles William Kelsey at St. George's Anglican Church (Montreal) depicts angels holding shields representing the Navy, Army and Air Force. Below the Army panel is written "He will swallow up death in victory and the Lord God will wipe away all tears from all faces, Isaiah 25:8." Below the Air Force Panel is written "Out of weakness made strong, waxed valiant in fight, turned to flight the armies of the aliens, Hebrews II:34". Below the Navy Panel is written "They that go down to the sea in ships, these see the works of the Lord and His wonders of the deep, Psalm 107:23".
- A World War I memorial window (1924) by Charles William Kelsey depicting a trench scene was dedicated at St. James United Church (Montreal) to 32 members who were killed overseas and 267 others who served in the Great War. The side lights represent the cardinal virtues, Justice, Prudence, Temperance and Fortitude.
- Rev T.W. Jones Memorial, Calvary United Church, now Westmount-Park-Emmanuel, Westmount
- World War I Congregational memorial, St. James United Church, 1923
- World War II Congregational memorial, St. George's Anglican Church, 1949
- Eric Rodger Church memorial, World War II, St Barnabas Anglican Church, Saint-Lambert, Quebec
- Frederick A Scott memorial, Ephraim Scott Memorial Presbyterian Church, 1949
- Canadian Legion Quebec Command, War Memorial Room, World War I & II memorial, 1949
- H. Stanley Brydges memorial, World War II, Montreal West United Church, 1945
- Reginald Ernest Vokey memorial, World War II, St. Stephen's Anglican Church, Lachine, Quebec, 1945
- World War II Congregational memorial, St. Matthews's Anglican Church, 1951
- Canadian Rangers Regiment, World War I memorial, Loyola Chapel, 1933
- World War I Congregational memorial, St. James United Church, 1923
- Congregation World War II memorial, Trinity Anglican Church, Ste. Agathe, 1948
- Joseph H.C. Roberts memorial, World War II, Montreal West United Church, 1942
- A. Irving Cooke memorial, World War II, St. Matthews's Anglican Church, 1947
- Congregational World War II memorial, St. Barnabas Church, Ottawa, 1947
