= Sommer Christie =

Canadian rugby union player

- Born: Wentworth, Quebec
- University: Concordia University

Rugby union career
- Position: scrumhalf
Amateur team(s)
Years	Team	Apps	(Points)
1999-2003	Concordia Stingers		
–	Ste. Anne de Bellevue RFC		
International career
Years	Team	Apps	(Points)
2002?-2006?	Canada		
Coaching career
- Years: Team
- 2006-2009?: Concordia Stingers

Sommer Christie is a Canadian rugby union player who participated at the 2002 and 2006 Women's Rugby World Cup. She earned an honourable mention in the list of the Ten Greatest North American Women rugby union players.

== Rugby ==
Christie played club rugby for Ste. Anne de Bellevue RFC. She represented the Concordia Stingers in university from 1999 to 2003, while studying exercise science, and was later assistant coach for the team. Christie was part of the first-ever World University Sevens Championship team.

=== Honours and achievements ===
- 2001, 2002, and 2003 CIS All-Canadian
- 3x CIS Academic All-Canadian
- 5x QSSF All-star
- 2002, QSSF women's rugby MVP
- 2002, Concordia University's Female Athlete of the Year
- 2004, FISU Rugby 7s All-star
- 2017, Concordia University Sport Hall of Fame induction

== Wheelchair rugby ==
Christie is a mental performance consultant, for the Canadian national wheelchair rugby team.
