= Montreal Jofa Titan =

- City: Montreal, Quebec, Canada
- League: National Women's Hockey League
- Division: Eastern
- Founded: 1998
- Folded: 1999
- Home arena: Ed Meagher Arena, Concordia University Loyola campus
- Head coach: Laurier Theriault
- Captain: Nancy Drolet; Alternate captains: Isabelle Surprenant

The Montreal Jofa Titan (1998–99) was a professional women's ice hockey team in the National Women's Hockey League (NWHL). The team played its home games at the Ed Meagher Arena in Montreal, Quebec, Canada.

== History ==
Montreal Jofa Titan began in the Repentigny Senior AA League. The team won the 1995–96 regular season and the 1996 Senior AA Quebec provincial championship. The Jofa Titan joined the National Women's Hockey League (NWHL) in 1998–99. The team closed in 1999 after just one season in the NWHL.

== Season 1998-99 ==
Year by year
Year	GP	W	L	T	GF	GA	Pts
1998-99	34	12	17	5	88	109	29

Note: GP = Games played, W = Wins, L = Losses, T = Ties, GF = Goals for, GA = Goals against, Pts = Points.

== Season standing ==
Year	Reg. season	Playoffs
1998-99	2nd, Eastern Division	lost in Eastern Division Finals

== Playoffs ==
Bonaventure Wingstar beat Montreal Jofa-Titan in a 2 games final series to capture the first NWHL Eastern Division Playoff Championship NWHL. Bonaventure Wingstar finished the 2 game total points final with a record of 1 win and 1 tie.

- April 17, 1999 - Bonaventure Wingstar 5, Montreal Jofa-Titan 1
- April 18, 1999 - Montreal Jofa-Titan 2 at Bonaventure Wingstar 2

== Current roster ==
Goalies
Number		Player	GP	MIN	W	L	T	GAA	GA	EN	ShO
31	(Canada)	Marie-Claude Roy	20	897	5	10	4	2.95	59	1	0
30	(Canada)	Isabelle Methot	16	678	7	7	1	3.25	49	0	1

Defense
Number		Player	GP	Goal	Assist	Pts	Pen
95	(Canada)	Isabelle Surprenant	26	3	8	11	18
41	(Canada)	Marie-Claude Pelletier	5	0	0	0	0
24	(Canada)	Mylene Daneau	31	2	5	7	14
11	(Canada)	Josee Sincerny	32	2	8	10	32
10	(Canada)	Stephanie Parent	3	0	2	2	2
7	(Canada)	Kelly Rae Ryan	33	2	9	11	48
4	(Canada)	Jessica Daneau	8	2	1	3	8
2	(Canada)	Christine Dupuis	29	0	5	5	20

Forward
Number		Player	GP	Goal	Assist	Pts	Pen
72	(Canada)	Sylvie Malenfant	8	2	2	4	0
47	(Canada)	Marie-France Rioux	10	1	2	3	0
25	(Canada)	Linda Loignon	30	4	9	13	22
23	(Canada)	Mai-Len Lê	21	12	10	22	28
22	(Canada)	Karine Vanasse	15	0	4	4	8
21	(Canada)	Sandra Dufour	33	7	7	14	46
19	(Canada)	Nathalie Chartrand	8	1	0	1	0
18	(Canada)	Nancy Drolet	19	15	6	21	29
16	(Canada)	Stephanie Grenon	34	8	6	14	16
13	(Canada)	Nancy Deschamps	30	13	15	28	33
12	(Canada)	Isabelle Ste-Marie	24	4	4	8	8
9	(Canada)	Jacinthe Gendron	34	10	9	19	46

=== Several players arise of Team Quebec ===
- Nancy Deschamps
- Stephanie Grenon
- Sylvie Malenfant
- Marie-Claude Roy

== Coaching staff ==
- General Manager:
- Head Coach: Laurier Theriault

== Award and honour ==
- 1998/99 Eastern Division 1st All Star Team: Isabelle Surprenant (Defense), Nancy Drolet (Forward).
- 1998/99 Eastern Division 2sd All Star Team: Marie-Claude Roy (Goalie), Mai-Lan Le (Forward).

== Notable former players ==
- Nancy Drolet (Canada national Team)
- Mai-Len Lê (Canada national Team 1998–2000)
