= John Dore (basketball) =

Canadian basketball coach

John Dore was the head coach of the Concordia Stingers men's basketball team from the 1989–1990 season to 2014–2015. He took the Concordia Stingers to the national championship tournament 10 times. Concordia won the national crown in 1990 and placed second in 1995 and 2005.

Dore was named CIAU Coach of the Year and received the Stuart W. Aberdeen Memorial Trophy as CIS (Canadian Interuniversity Sport) Men’s Basketball Coach of the Year, in 1991.

In 1995, he was named University Coach of the Year, by the Foundation for Quebec University Athletics.

In the 2006–2007 season, John Dore coached the Concordia Stingers Basketball team to a third straight first-place finish in the Quebec conference with a 15-1 record and a No. 2-ranking in Canada.

John was assistant coach of Canada's junior men’s national team, in 1998, and led several national teams, including Canadian entries at World University Games (Universiade) and the Maccabiah Games (with Glen Grunwald, former general manager of the Toronto Raptors). He has also been president of the National Association of Basketball Coaches of Canada and an international committee member of the National Association of Basketball Coaches, U.S.A.
