= Émilie Lavoie =

Canadian ice hockey player (born 2001)

- Born: July 30, 2001 (age 25) Beloeil, Quebec, Canada
- Height: 5 ft 7 in (170 cm)
- Position: Forward
- Shoots: Left
- U Sports team: Concordia Stingers
- National team: Canada
- Playing career: 2021–present
Medal record
World University Games
Silver medal – second place	2025 Torino	Ice hockey

Émilie Lavoie (born July 30, 2001) is a Canadian ice hockey forward. Her college ice hockey career was played with the Concordia Stingers women's ice hockey program. She was drafted by the Montreal Victoire of the Professional Women's Hockey League (PWHL) in the 2026 PWHL Draft.

== Playing career ==
=== College ===
On October 21, 2020, Lavoie committed to play college ice hockey at Concordia University. During the 2021–22 season, in her rookie season, she recorded eight goals and eight assists in fifteen games and was named to the U Sports women's ice hockey all-rookie team. She ranked sixth in the Réseau du sport étudiant du Québec (RSEQ) conference, with sixteen points, and was the highest scoring rookie. She was also named the Laurie Brodrick Award winner and RSEQ Rookie of the Year.

During the 2022–23 season, she recorded twelve goals and seventeen assists in 25 games and was named to the RSEQ second All-Star team.

During the 2023–24 season, she recorded fifteen goals and twelve assists in 24 games and was named to the RSEQ second All-Star team for the second consecutive year.

She finished her career at Concordia with 54 goals and 67 assists in five seasons, and helped lead the Stingers to two U Sports national championships, and two silver medals.

=== Professional ===
On June 17, 2026, Lavoie was drafted in the sixth round, 72nd overall, by the Montreal Victoire in the 2026 PWHL Draft.

== International play ==
On December 11, 2024, Lavoie was selected to represent Canada at the 2025 Winter World University Games. During the tournament she recorded two goals and four assists in five games and won a silver medal.

== Career statistics ==
			Regular season					Playoffs
Season	Team	League	GP	G	A	Pts	PIM	GP	G	A	Pts	PIM
2021–22	Concordia University	RSEQ	15	8	8	16	14	4	0	0	0	4
2022–23	Concordia University	RSEQ	25	12	17	29	18	5	1	3	4	2
2023–24	Concordia University	RSEQ	24	15	12	27	33	6	2	4	6	4
2024–25	Concordia University	RSEQ	20	13	15	28	20	—	—	—	—	—
2025–26	Concordia University	RSEQ	23	6	15	21	31	—	—	—	—	—
RSEQ totals			107	54	67	121	116	15	3	7	10	20
