= Emmy Fecteau =

Canadian ice hockey player (born 1999)

- Born: 7 April 1999 (age 27) Saint-Odilon-de-Cranbourne, Quebec, Canada
- Height: 5 ft 6 in (168 cm)
- Weight: 150 lb (68 kg; 10 st 10 lb)
- Position: Centre
- Shoots: Left
- PWHL team: New York Sirens
- Playing career: 2024–present

Emmy Fecteau (born April 7, 1999) is a Canadian ice hockey player who is a centre for the New York Sirens of the Professional Women's Hockey League (PWHL). She was selected in the sixth round, 31st overall, in the 2024 PWHL Draft by the Sirens. She previously played college ice hockey for the Concordia Stingers.

== Playing career ==
=== College ===
Fecteau played in the 2022, 2023 and 2024 U Sports women's ice hockey championship games, winning in 2022 and 2024. Concordia lost in 2023 on a last second goal to Mount Royal University. In 2023, she was awarded the Isobel Gathorne-Hardy Award, which awarded by Hockey Canada to an active player (at any level) whose values, leadership and personal traits are representative of all female athletes. She served as captain on the 2023–24 team which went undefeated.

=== Professional ===
The Hockey News ranked Fecteau as the top ranked French Canadian ahead of the 2024 PWHL Draft. Fecteau, alongside Rylind MacKinnon, became one of two U Sports players go directly into the PWHL when they made opening night rosters for the 2024–25 season.

== Personal life ==
Fecteau is originally from the municipality of Saint-Odilon-de-Cranbourne, Quebec. At Concordia University, she studied towards a bachelor's degree in education with a specialization in English as a Second Language.

== Career statistics ==
			Regular season					Playoffs
Season	Team	League	GP	G	A	Pts	PIM	GP	G	A	Pts	PIM
2019–20	Concordia University	RSEQ	20	6	11	17	16	3	1	1	2	4
2021–22	Concordia University	RSEQ	15	6	9	15	12	4	0	6	6	8
2022–23	Concordia University	RSEQ	23	13	19	32	26	5	0	5	5	8
2023–24	Concordia University	RSEQ	25	9	16	25	14	6	4	9	13	0
2024–25	New York Sirens	PWHL	30	1	0	1	6	—	—	—	—	—
2025–26	New York Sirens	PWHL	28	0	1	1	27	—	—	—	—	—
PWHL totals			58	1	1	2	33	—	—	—	—	—

== Awards and honors ==
- 2023 Isobel Gathorne Hardy Award
- 2024 U Sports Marion Hilliard Award
- 2025 PWHL Intact Impact Award
