= Concordia Stingers =

Athletic teams representing Concordia University

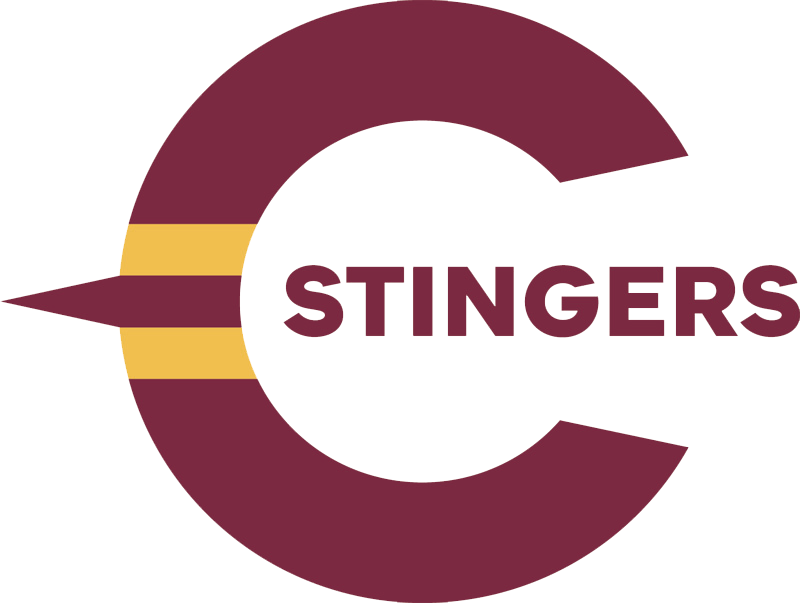
- University: Concordia University
- Nickname: Stingers
- Association: U Sports
- Conference: RSEQ
- Athletic director: D'Arcy Ryan
- Location: Montreal, Quebec
- Varsity teams: 8 (4 men's, 4 women's)
- Football stadium: Concordia Stadium
- Ice hockey arena: Ed Meagher Arena
- Soccer stadium: Stinger Dome
- Colours: Maroon, Gold, and White
- Mascot: Buzz
- Website: stingers.ca

The Concordia Stingers are the athletic teams that represent Concordia University in Montreal, Quebec, Canada. They compete with other schools in Canadian Interuniversity Sport, and more specifically in Réseau du sport étudiant du Québec (RSEQ; French for "Quebec Student Sports Network"). The Stingers were established in 1974 when Sir George Williams University and Loyola College merged to form Concordia University and replaced the preceding Sir George Williams Georgians and Loyola Warriors.

The university has 10 varsity teams - football, men's and women's soccer, men's and women's rugby, wrestling, men's and women's hockey and men's and women's basketball.

== Varsity teams ==
They are known as "Varsity 1":

Men's sports	Women's sports
Basketball	Basketball
Football	Ice hockey
Ice hockey	Rugby
Soccer	Soccer

=== Football ===
The Concordia Stingers football team is currently coached by Brad Collinson and plays home games at the Concordia Stadium. The Stingers appeared in one Vanier Cup national championship in 1998, but lost to the Saskatchewan Huskies. The Stingers won the Dunsmore Cup three times, but have lost each of the last five times they have appeared in the Quebec title game.

=== Basketball ===
The men's basketball team is coached by Aleks Mitrovic, and the women's basketball team by Tenicha Gittens. John Dore was a former coach.

The men's basketball program is a perennial championship-contending squad, having last won the Quebec title in 2019.

On August 1, 2024, the Concordia Stingers men's basketball team defeated the Air Force Falcons men's basketball 71–55 in a preseason exhibition match. This was the Stingers' first win over an NCAA Division I squad since a 2019 win over the Quinnipiac University Bobcats, by a score of 98–90.

2024-25 Concordia Men's Basketball Roster & Coaching Staff
No.	Pos.	Player	Eleg.	Hometown	Notes
3	F	Yohan Leger	1	Laval, QC	2024-25 RSEQ All-Rookie Team
4	G	Alec Phaneuf	4	Gatineau, QC	2024-25 RSEQ Second Team All-Star
5	G	Emmanuel Duprate	2	Anjou, QC	
7	G	Junior Mercy	3	Roxboro, QC	2024-25 RSEQ Second Team All-Star Transferred from Lethbridge Pronghorns
8	G	Miguel Doyon-Jérémy	1	Sherbrooke, QC	2024-25 RSEQ All-Rookie Team
9	G	Nino Lamborot	2	Paron, Yonne, France	
10	G	Louis-Vincent Gauvin	5	Candiac, QC	
11	F	Tyrell Lamar Williams	4	Montreal, QC	
12	G	Owen Soontjens	4	Corbais, Mont-Saint-Guibert, Belgium	Transferred from Adelphi Panthers 17th ranked player by Belgian nationality in the FIBA 3x3 circuit.
13	G	Jordan Telfort	2	Boucherville, QC	Brother of Butler Bulldogs men's basketball player Jahmyl Telfort.
14	F	Gabriel Bourdages	2	Gatineau, QC	
15	F/C	Karam Sahly	2	Gatineau, QC	2023-24 RSEQ All Rookie Team
20	F/C	Aurele Ouellet	2	Mont-Tremblant, QC	
21	F	Liam Daniel Ngos	1	Gatineau, QC	
22	G	Jaheem Joseph	3	Ottawa, ON	2024-25 USports Second Team All-Canadian 2024-25 RSEQ First Team All-Star 2023-24 RSEQ Second Team All-Star 2022-23 RSEQ All Rookie Team Lost vision in his right eye in 2020.
23	F	Ba-Amara Djame	3	Montreal, QC	Transferred from Ontario Tech Ridgebacks
24	C	Peniel Goujou	1	LaSalle, QC	
RS	G	Sami Jahan	5	Hamilton, ON	2022-23, 2023-24 RSEQ First Team All-Star 2021-22 RSEQ Second Team All-Star 2019-20 RSEQ All Rookie Team
RS	G	Jeremy Royer	1	Montreal, QC	
Coach	Interim HC	Aleks Mitrovic		Belgrade, Serbia	Played for University of Mount Olive Trojans (then Mount Olive College) and McGill Redbirds until 2013. Currently plays for team EPIC.EXE of the Japanese 3x3.EXE premier league. Former player of the Shinagawa City Basketball Club of the Japanese B.League. 2012-13 RSEQ Second Team All-Star (as a player).
Coach	AC	Damian Buckley		Montreal, QC	Played for Concordia from 2005 to 2009. 2008-09 U Sports First Team All-Canadian (as a player) 2007-08 U Sports Second Team All-Canadian 2008-09 RSEQ Player of the Year Played professionally from 2012 to 2013 for the Montreal Jazz of the NBL Canada. 2005–06, 2006–07, 2007–08, and 2008-09 RSEQ First Team All-Star. Assistant coach for Concordia from 2015 to 2022, for Ottawa Gee-Gees from 2022 to 2024. Former Head Coach of the Montreal Toundra of the Basketball Super League and Assistant Coach of the Ottawa BlackJacks of the Canadian Elite Basketball League.
Coach	AC	Jay Prosper		Montreal, QC	Played for Concordia from 1995 to 1999 and UQAM Citadins from 2004 to 2005. 1997-98 and 1998-1999 RSEQ Player of the Year. 1998-1999 Second Team All-Canadian. 1996–97, 1997–98, 1998-1999 RSEQ First Team All-Star. 2004-05 RSEQ Second Team All-Star.
Coach	AC	Michel Enanga		Yaoundé, Cameroon	Played for Coastal Carolina Chanticleers men's basketball from 2012 to 2017

== Rugby ==
In November 2005, Concordia's rugby team came from behind to beat McGill 20–18 at the Percival Molson Stadium to take the men's rugby provincial championship—the school's first since 2001.

The women's rugby team is currently coached by Jocelyn Barrieau with Hughanna Gaw, Craig McDevitt, Craig Beemer, and Lia Hoyte as assistant coaches. In 2010, the Stingers won the Quebec conference and took home a silver medal from the CIS national championship. The women also advanced to nationals in 2009 and placed fourth. Also in 2009, Hughanna Gaw was named 2009 CIS Rookie of the Year. Several stingers played on the senior national fifteens and sevens team including Josée Lacasse, Micheline Green, Erin Dance, Natascha Wesch, Sheila Turner, Margaret Thompson, Sommer Christie, Bianca Farella, Alex Tessier, and Frédérique Rajotte.

== Soccer ==
The men's and women's soccer team is under the direction of former Canadian national team goalkeeper Greg Sutton.

== Wrestling ==
Future Olympian Garry Kallos attended Concordia (Bachelor of Applied Science '80), and competed in the 95+ kilo weight class at the Canadian Interuniversity Athletic Union championships, winning a gold medal in 1978 and again in 1984. He was named to the Concordia University Sports Hall of Fame in 2002. Future Olympian Andy Borodow also competed for the school.

== Club teams ==
They are known as "Varsity 2":

Men's sports	Women's sports
Basketball	Cross country
Cross country	Golf
Golf	Track and field
Rugby	Wrestling
Track and field	
Wrestling

=== Baseball ===
The baseball club, which operates in the fall season under head coach Howie Schwartz, is composed of mostly elite and AA level players from summer leagues and competes at the club level against other schools in Quebec, Ontario and an array of schools from Atlantic Canada for a national championship in late October. The Cape Breton University Capers won in 2005 and Concordia did not make the playoffs. In 2007, the baseball team won their first conference championship in school history over the University of Ottawa Gee-Gees advancing to their first CIBA National Championships. They lost 2–0 in the championship final against the University of New Brunswick.

In 2008, they lost the Conference Title to the Collège Laflèche Dragons in a three-game series.

In 2009, the Concordia Stingers defeated the University of Ottawa Gee-Gees in two straight games to win the CIBA Northern Conference and advance to the CIBA National Championships for the second time in three years. Despite dropping two of their round robin games, on the final day of the tournament, the team won three straight games to capture its first national championship. They defeated the OUA Champion Western University Mustangs 6–2 in the tie-breaker for Fourth Place. The Gee-Gees who were in the Nationals as a Wild Card and beat the Stingers for some revenge in the tournament's opening game, were the next victim, as The Stingers won 4–3 with a sixth and seventh inning comeback. In the Championship game, despite going down 1-0 early in the game the Stingers stormed back to win 12–2.

In 2010, the Stingers went 11-5 and finished second to the McGill University Redmen who were 13–3. The Stingers were 3–1 against the Redmen during the regular season. After dropping the Ottawa Gee-Gees in the Semis, the Maroon and Gold defeated McGill in three games in the Finals to capture their second straight Conference championship. At the Nationals in Windsor, Ontario, the Stingers bowed out in the semi-finals, losing to the Brock University Badgers.

In 2011, the Stingers went 13-3 and finished in first place. In the Semi Finals, the Stingers ousted the Redmen in three games after dropping the first game of the series to their fourth place rival. With the series win, The Stingers clinched a trip to their third consecutive CIBA National Championships, to be held in Moncton, New Brunswick. The Stingers failed in their bid to win a third straight conference title, losing in three games to the Carleton University Ravens.

=== Cross-country running ===
A cross-country running team was revived in 2004. The head coach is currently John Lofranco.

== Promotions and Dance Team ==
The Spirit Team was established in 2005, serving as the university's first ever dance/cheer team, performing at football games.

== Awards and honors ==
=== Athletes of the Year ===
The Concordia Stingers Female Athlete of the Year is presented with the Sally Kemp Award. The Male Athlete of the Year is bestowed the honour of the Dr. J. Robert Brodrick Award.

Year	Female athlete	Sport	Male athlete	Sport	Ref.
2016–17	Alexandra Tessier	Rugby	Anthony Beauregard	Hockey	
2017–18	Frédérique Rajotte	Rugby	Francis Carter	Wrestling	
2018–19	Jade Dufour	Wrestling	Ricardo Monge	Basketball	
2019–20	Rosalie Bégin-Cyr	Ice hockey	Adam Vance	Football	

== See also ==
- U Sports
