= St. James United Church (Montreal) =

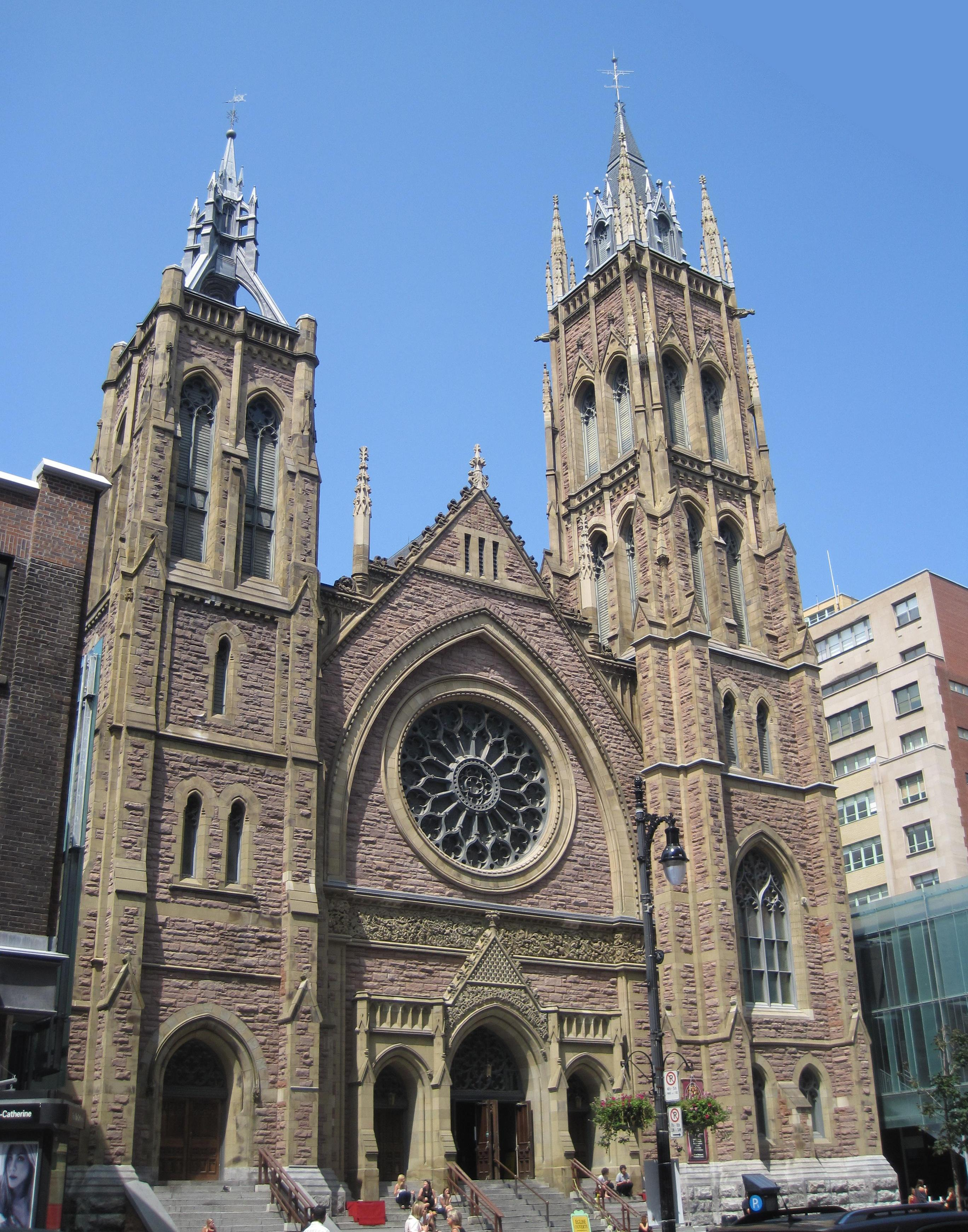
- St. James United Church on Saint Catherine Street in Downtown Montreal.

- Location within Montreal
- 45.5054°N 73.5686°W
- Location: 1435 City Councillors street Montreal, Quebec; H3A 2E4
- Denomination: United Church of Canada
- Previous denomination: Methodist Church of Canada
- Website: www.stjamesmontreal.ca/

History
- Status: active
- Founded: 1803

Architecture
- Architect: Alexander Francis Dunlop
- Architectural type: Gothic Revival
- Groundbreaking: 1887
- Completed: 1889

Specifications
- Capacity: 1,200

Clergy
- Pastor

National Historic Site of Canada
- Official name: St. James United Church National Historic Site of Canada
- Designated: 1996

Patrimoine culturel du Québec
- Type: Classified heritage immovable
- Designated: 1980
- Reference no.: 92747

Saint James United Church is a heritage church in the city's downtown core of Montreal, Quebec, Canada. It is a Protestant church affiliated with the United Church of Canada. It is located at 463 Saint Catherine Street West between Saint Alexandre and City Councillors Streets (McGill metro station), in the borough of Ville-Marie within Downtown Montreal. It was designated as a National Historic Site of Canada in 1996.

The Gothic Revival church was designed by Montreal architect Alexander Francis Dunlop. It is noteworthy for its false apse housing church offices and for its Casavant Frères organ.

== History ==
When it was built in June 1889, it was the largest Methodist church in Canada, with 2,000 seats; it was nicknamed the "Cathedral Church of Methodism." It now belongs to the United Church of Canada, into which the Canadian Methodists merged in 1925. Its congregation founded the first YMCA in North America on November 25, 1851 (before the present church building was built) and led an active campaign for women's suffrage early in the 20th century.

A World War I memorial window (1924) by Charles William Kelsey depicting a trench scene at St. James United Church (Montreal) was dedicated to 32 members who were killed overseas and 267 others who served in the Great War. The side lights represent the cardinal virtues, Justice, Prudence, Temperance and Fortitude.

In 1927, to cover upkeep costs, the church permitted a commercial building to be built in front of its Sainte Catherine Street façade. The building, adjoining the church's structure, concealed the church for over 78 years, the church itself being announced by a large neon sign.

In 2005, as part of an $8-million restoration effort sponsored by the city of Montreal and the Quebec government, a portion of the commercial buildings were demolished, once again revealing the facade of the church as well as a new public square designed by Quebec architect Claude Cormier. Access has also been restored to the rear lawn from Sainte Catherine Street.

== Beliefs ==
=== Marriage ===
The church has an inclusive statement of faith that celebrates both opposite-sex marriages and same-sex marriages.

== Gallery ==
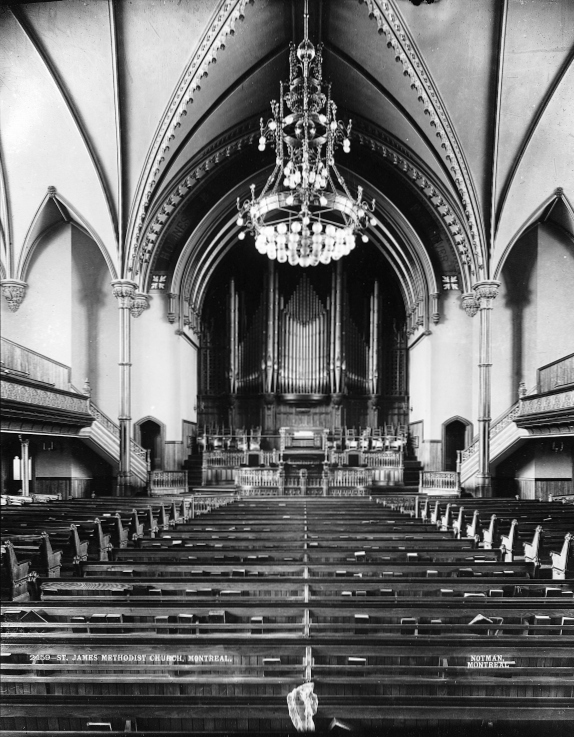
The church interior in 1892.

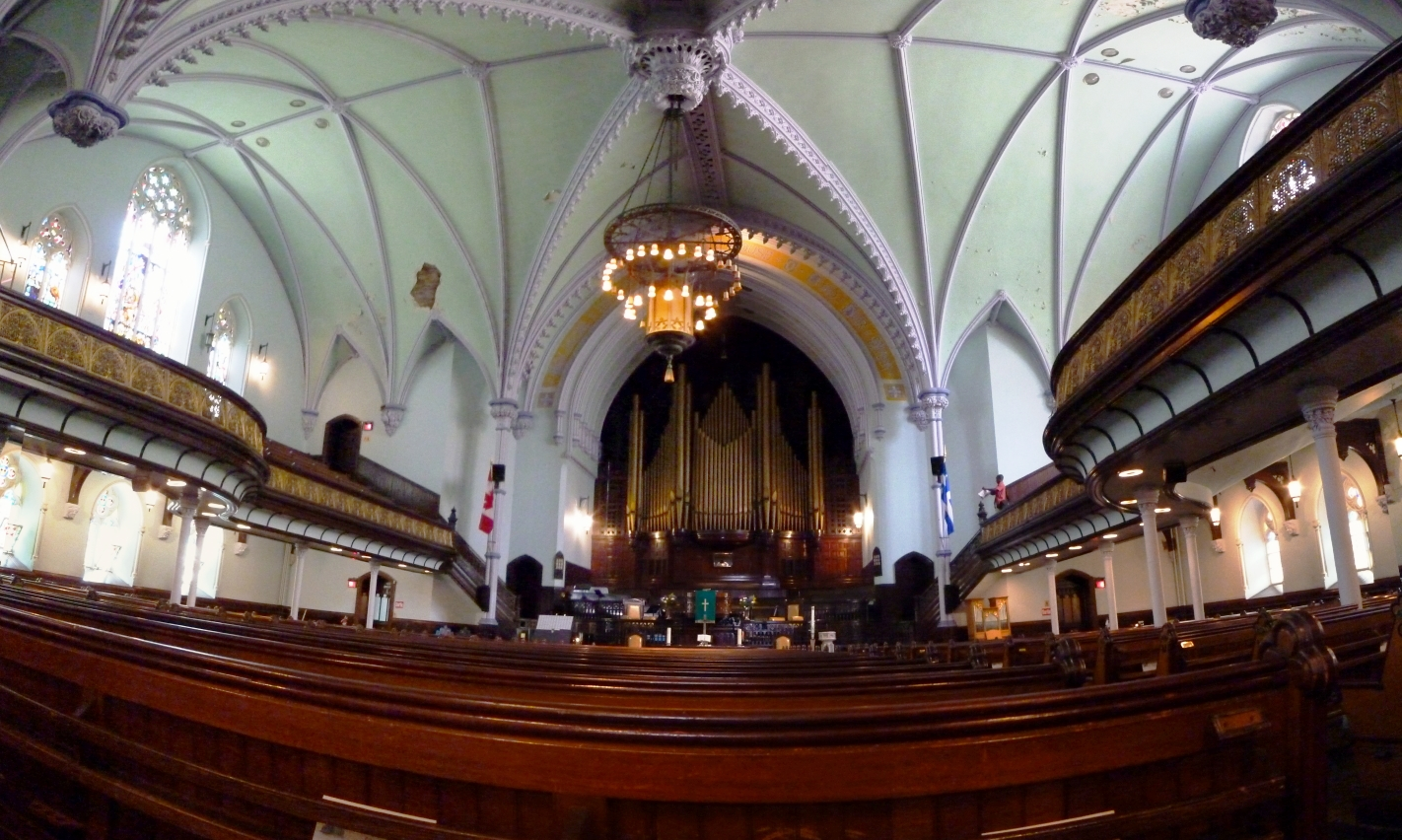
Church interior.

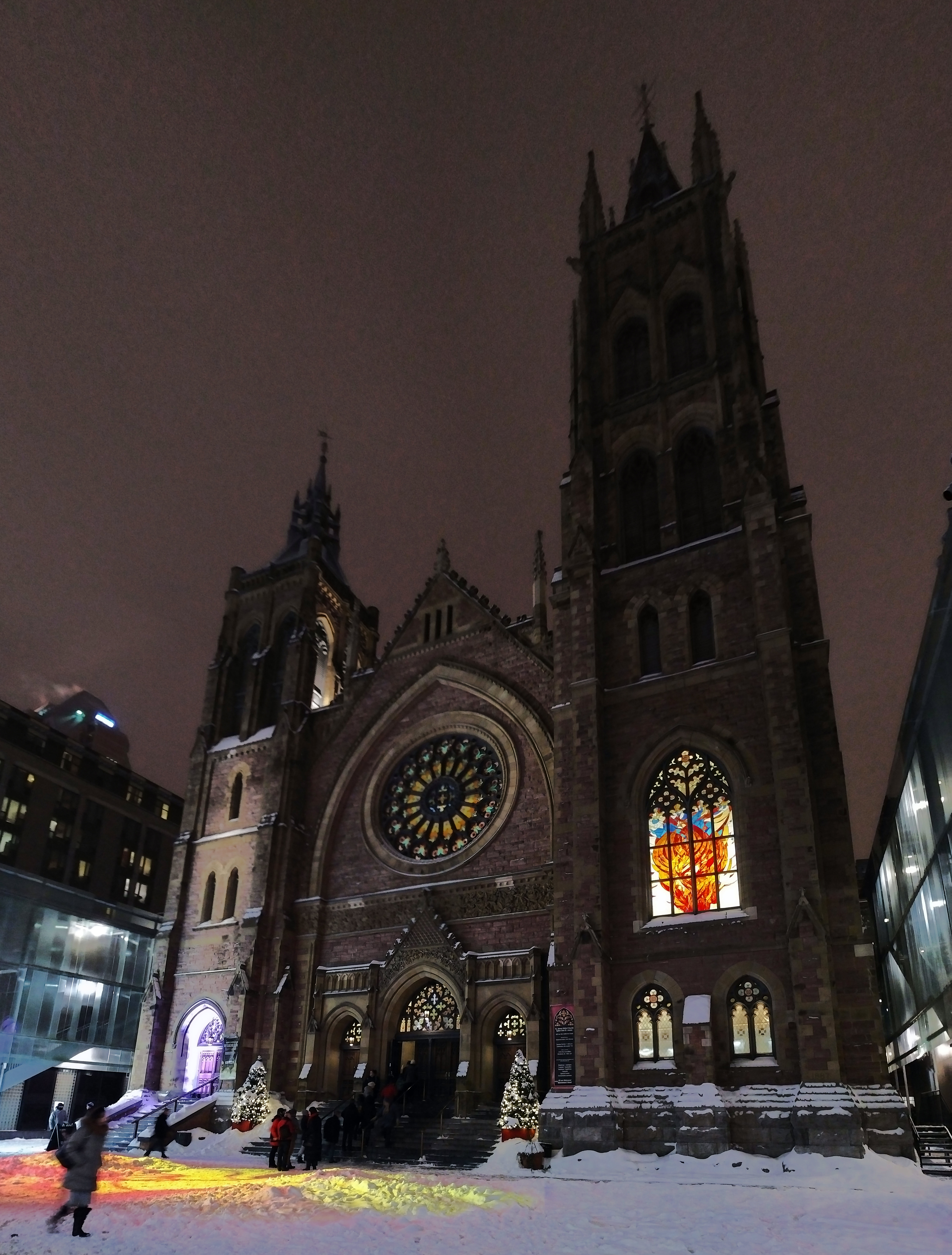
The church exterior in December, 2016.

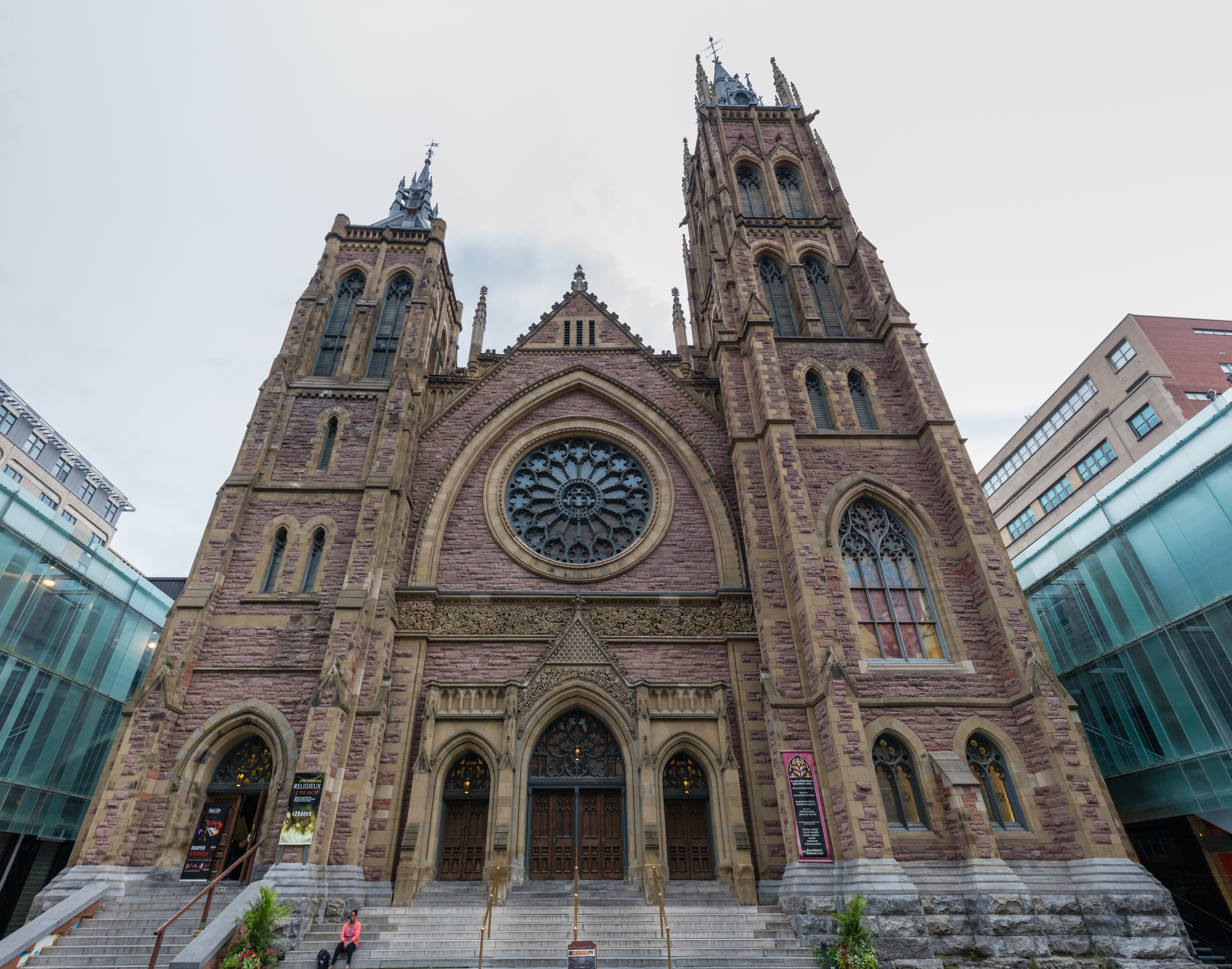
Frontal view.

== See also ==
- Christ Church Cathedral (Montreal)
