= Ministerial discretion (Canadian law) =

Canadian government procedure

The idea of ministerial discretion, when employed in Canadian statute law, means the power of a Crown minister to vary or alter the decisions of their bureaucrats, one of their Committees, or one of their Boards. The idea derives from the laws of the United Kingdom, of which Canada, under the rubric of British North America, once was part. The term needs to be written into the statute, as for example in section 51 of the Canadian Oil and Gas Operations Act:

The Governor in Council may at any time, in his discretion, either on petition of any interested person or of his own motion, vary or rescind any decision or order of the Committee made under this Act, whether the order is made between parties or otherwise and any order that the Governor in Council makes with respect thereto becomes a decision or order of the Committee and, subject to section 52, is binding on the Committee and on all parties.

== SCC definition ==
In 1999, as it appeared to Justice L'Heureux-Dubé and her majority,

The concept of discretion refers to decisions where the law does not dictate a specific outcome, or where the decision-maker is given a choice of options within a statutorily imposed set of boundaries. Administrative law has traditionally approached the review of decisions classified as discretionary separately from those seen as involving the interpretation of rules of law. Review of the substantive aspects of discretionary decisions is best approached within the pragmatic and functional framework defined by this Court’s decisions, especially given the difficulty in making rigid classifications between discretionary and non-discretionary decisions. Though discretionary decisions will generally be given considerable respect, that discretion must be exercised in accordance with the boundaries imposed in the statute, the principles of the rule of law, the principles of administrative law, the fundamental values of Canadian society, and the principles of the Charter.

== Immigration, refugees, citizenship and extradition ==
In special cases enumerated under section 5(4) of the legislation, the Minister is empowered at their discretion to grant citizenship or other immigration status, as described in Baker v Canada.

Idziak v Canada dealt with an extradition case, in which the appellant, who was wanted by the Attorney-General of the US, sought to remain in Canada. The Minister refused to exercise their discretionary authority not to surrender the appellant to American justice.

== Education ==
The Quebec Minister of Education sought to impose upon Loyola High School his own syllabus, in disregard of explicit legislated instruction. It appeared to Abella J that

where a discretionary administrative decision engages the protections enumerated in the Charter — both the Charter’s guarantees and the foundational values they reflect — the discretionary decision-maker is required to proportionately balance the Charter protections to ensure that they are limited no more than is necessary given the applicable statutory objectives that she or he is obliged to pursue.

== Fisheries ==
The Minister in charge of the Department of Fisheries and Oceans disregarded a non-discretionary regime that was imposed upon him in Species at Risk Act, and tried to substitute it for a discretionary power he found in the Fisheries Act. He was overruled by the Federal Court of Appeal in DFO v David Suzuki Foundation.

== Investment Canada Act ==
In certain circumstances, Canadian corporations subject to foreign takeover bids are entitled to the discretion of the Minister for Industry and, if the Minister decides that the proposed takeover is not of “net benefit” to Canada, it fails.
