= Loyola High School (Montreal) =

Loyola High School Montreal

Location
- 7272 Sherbrooke Street West; Montreal, Quebec; Canada; 45°27′23.93″N 73°38′22.33″W

Information
- Type: Independent
- Motto: Ad Majorem Dei Gloriam: For the Greater Glory of God
- Religious affiliations: Roman Catholic, (Jesuit)
- Established: 1896; 130 years ago
- Principal: Mark Diaschyshyn
- Grades: 7-11
- Enrollment: 750
- Colors: Maroon and White
- Team name: Warriors
- Tuition: $10,450
- Website: www.loyola.ca

Loyola High School is a co-educational subsidized private Roman Catholic school, adhering to the Jesuit tradition, for grades 7–11. The school is located in the Loyola District of the Côte-des-Neiges–Notre-Dame-de-Grâce borough in Montreal, Quebec, Canada. It was established in 1896 by the Society of Jesus as part of Loyola College, at the request of the English Catholic community in Montreal. It is named after St. Ignatius of Loyola, who founded the Jesuit Order in 1534.

== History ==
Founded in 1896, Loyola High School began as Loyola College (an eight-year classical college or "collège classique") which assumed responsibility for the English section of Collège Sainte-Marie de Montréal, a French Jesuit school which existed from 1848 to 1969. In 1915, Loyola College moved from its downtown location to the west end location on Sherbrooke St. West. In 1964, the Loyola High School Corporation was established to run the High School separately from the College. Loyola College merged with Sir George Williams University in 1974 to form Concordia University. Once all-boys, the school became fully co-educational in 2023.

== School campus ==
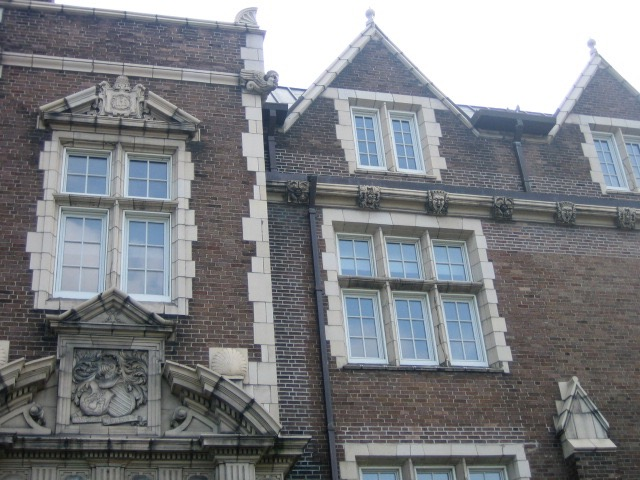
Junior Building's east facing facade

Loyola was originally located in an abandoned Sacred Heart Convent on Bleury and St. Catherine Street. A fire broke out at this location in 1898, forcing the college to move into the former Tucker School on Drummond Street. That summer, a wing was added, but space soon became inadequate. In 1900, the Jesuits purchased the Decary Farm in Notre-Dame-de-Grâce located in the west end of Montreal.

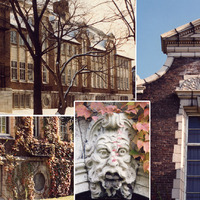
Junior Building's north facing facade

In 1916, Loyola College officially moved to the new campus. The high school was located in the Junior Building and, until 1961, shared the Administration Building and then the north half of the Central Building. It was the original campus, which was designed in the Collegiate Gothic architectural style and covered in gargoyles, leaded and stained-glass windows and oak moulding, where young men began their journey to become "Eight-Year Men". After four years of high school and four years of college, they graduated with university degrees in Arts or Sciences.

In 1961, the era of boarders ended and the high school moved exclusively to the Junior Building. An extension was added in 1970 and a gymnasium was built south of Sherbrooke Street in 1978. In 1988 a decision was reached to erect a new building in order to properly accommodate the student body and to enable the school to offer the curriculum outlined by the Ministry of Education.

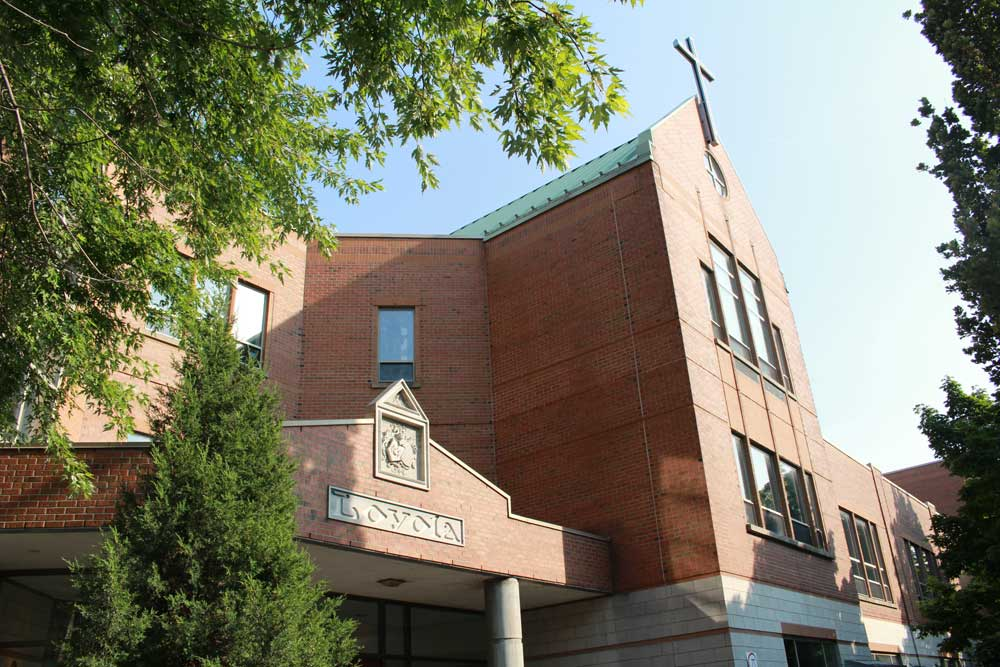
New building's north facing facade

Loyola considered a number of possible options for the future building, including adding an extension onto the Junior Building. The school eventually made arrangements with Concordia University to swap the Junior Building for a site on the southwest end of the Loyola campus beside the school gymnasium. The new building was completed in 1992. The Bishops Atrium and a three-story wing were constructed in 2004, along with the Eric Maclean, S.J. Centre for the Performing Arts auditorium the following year.

== Academic ==
In the school’s Mission Statement, Loyola is described as a “university-preparatory school.” Students are also expected to complete the requirements for a Secondary School Diploma to be admitted to C.E.G.E.P. Core and optional subjects offered in the high school curriculum are broken down according to cycle - Cycle 1 (years 1 and 2) and Cycle 2 (years 3, 4, and 5). The high school performs competitively locally and provincially in examinations results.

== Religious and spiritual formation ==
As a Catholic and Jesuit school, all of Loyola's activities are meant to be inspired by Catholic teachings in the tradition of St. Ignatius of Loyola.

While the school's president is ultimately responsible for ensuring the school's spiritual mission, the Loyola Ignatian Formation director oversees its particular activities in the entire Loyola community (alumni, parents, faculty, and students). The Campus Ministry is tasked with overseeing students' spiritual formation.

=== Jesuit affiliation ===
Loyola is a member of the American Jesuit Schools Network, and is administered by the Jesuits of English Canada. The two Jesuit provinces, English and French, are currently in the process of merging into one Canadian Jesuit province.

== Athletics ==
Loyola fields a number of athletic teams in competition with other schools in Canada and the United States, primarily competing in the Greater Montreal Athletics Association and Réseau du sport étudiant du Québec. Loyola's traditional rivals in athletics were Lower Canada College and Selwyn House School.

- Double gym (volleyball, basketball, wrestling, tennis)
- Strength and conditioning room (wrestling)
- The Lower Fields (football, soccer, rugby, ultimate)
- Concordia Stadium (football, soccer, rugby, ultimate); seating capacity of 4000
- Stinger Dome (ultimate)
- Ed Meagher Arena (hockey): upgraded to NHL standards in 2013
- Concordia Gym (basketball and wrestling during Ed Meagher Tournament only)

== Coat of arms ==
The name "Loyola" is derived from the Spanish Lobo-y-olla, meaning "wolf" and "kettle". The school's coat of arms is a variation of St. Ignatius of Loyola's coat of arms, which depicts the union of the House of Loyola (represented by the two wolves and kettle) and the House of Onaz (represented by the seven red bars on a field of gold) in 1261. The phrase "Loyola y Onaz" typically appears at the bottom, though another variation of the school's coat of arms includes the Jesuit motto "Ad Majorem Dei Gloriam", meaning "for the greater glory of God".

== Loyola in print ==
- Jim Pearson, Loyola and Montreal: Stories from Our History (Montreal: 2018)
- Joseph B. Gavin, S.J., From 'Le petit collège de bois' to 7272 Sherbrooke St. West: A Brief History of Loyola High School, Montreal (Montreal: 2012)
- Dr. Gil Drolet, Loyola, The Wars: In Remembrance of 'Men for Others' (Waterloo: Laurier Centre for Military Strategic and Disarmament Studies, 1996)
- T.P. Slattery, Loyola and Montreal (Montreal: Palm Publishers, 1962)

== Loyola in court ==
In 2008, Quebec's Ministry of Education, Sport and Leisure introduced a mandatory "Ethics and Religious Culture" (ERC) course to all Quebec schools. Loyola had reservations about the course's ability to meet its objectives from a relativistic perspective, and applied for an exemption to teach an ERC equivalency course. Loyola's equivalency course had similar goals as the government's ERC but was structured on a methodology that was more in keeping with its Catholic, Jesuit identity. The government denied the request for exemption and, as a result, Loyola took the matter to the Superior Court of Quebec where in 2010 the Superior Court ruled in Loyola's favour. The Ministry appealed and in 2012 the appellate court overturned the Superior Court's decision.

Loyola then took the case to the Supreme Court of Canada where, on 19 March 2015, it was ruled that the Quebec Ministry was in violation of Loyola's religious freedom and ordered the Ministry to reconsider the exemption.

== Notable alumni ==
=== Religion ===
- Jean Vanier (1943) – founder of L'Arche
- Terrance Prendergast, S.J. (1961) – Archbishop of Ottawa, Canada
- Michael Czerny, S.J. (1963) – Cardinal, Under-secretary to Pope Francis in Migrants and Refugees Section

=== Politics, law and business ===
- Georges P. Vanier (1906) – Governor General of Canada
- Charles Gavan "Chubby" Power (1906) – Senate of Canada; Canada federal Minister
- Eric Kierans (1931) – Quebec provincial Minister and federal Minister, President Montreal Stock Exchange
- Zbigniew Brzezinski (1943) – United States National Security Advisor to President Jimmy Carter
- Warren Allmand (1948) – Solicitor-General of Canada, Canada federal Minister
- Dominic D'Alessandro – President and CEO of Manulife Financial
- Allan Lutfy (1963) – Chief Justice of the Federal Court of Canada
- Michael L. Phelan (1964) – Judge of the Federal Court of Canada
- Jim Flaherty (1966) – Canada federal Minister of Finance
- Robert J. Bauman (1967) – Chief Justice of British Columbia and Chief Justice of the Court of Appeal for the Yukon
- Daniel Fournier (1971) – Chairman of the Board and CEO of Ivanhoé Cambridge
- Gerald T. McCaughey (1972) – President and CEO of the Canadian Imperial Bank of Commerce
- Francis Scarpaleggia (1974) – Speaker of the House of Commons; Liberal Member of Parliament for Lac-Saint-Louis
- Jean-Pierre Blais (1978) – Chairman of the Canadian Radio-television and Telecommunications Commission
- Noubar Afeyan (1978) – Chairman and Co-founder of Moderna

=== Arts, entertainment, and writing ===
- Hector de Saint-Denys Garneau (1924) – poet, diarist, painter
- Peter Desbarats – author, playwright and journalist
- Richard Monette (1963) – actor, artistic director of the Stratford Festival of Canada
- Don Ferguson (1963) – of the Royal Canadian Air Farce
- Roger Abbott (1963) – of the Royal Canadian Air Farce
- Mark Starowicz (1964) – historian, producer, journalist
- Don Carmody (1968) – Academy Award-winning film producer
- Michael Sarrazin – Hollywood actor
- Stephen Campanelli (1976) - film-maker and cameraman
- David Acer (1987) – author, magician and stand-up comedy performer
- Joseph Donovan (1992) – Juno Award-winning music producer for Sam Roberts Band
- Sam Roberts (1992) – Juno Award-winning singer, songwriter with Sam Roberts Band

=== Philosophy and academia ===
- Bernard J.F. Lonergan, S.J. (1922) – philosopher and theologian
- William Joseph Mackey, S.J. (1932) – responsible for establishing the modern education system in Bhutan
- Witold Rybczynski (1966) – architect, historian, Professor of Urbanism

=== Athletics ===
- Ralph Toohy (1943) – football player CFL, Montreal Alouette, Hamilton Tiger-Cats; three-time Grey Cup champion; four-time All-Star
- Keith English (1945) – football player CFL, Montreal Alouette, Grey Cup champion, Rookie of the year – 1948
- Brian F. O'Neill (1945) – executive vice president of NHL; Stanley Cup trustee; elected to the Hockey Hall of Fame
- Jim Madigan – Head Coach Northeastern University men's ice hockey
- Alexander Killorn (2006) – ice hockey player NHL, Tampa Bay Lightning; two-time Stanley Cup champion

== See also ==
- List of Jesuit sites
