= Ethics and religious culture =

Ethics and religious culture (Éthique et culture religieuse), abbr. ERC or ÉCR, was a course taught in all primary and secondary schools in Quebec. It replaces the abolished subject of religious/moral education in these schools and is compulsory in all schools: private and public. The aim of the subject is to develop ethical thinking and dialog skills in response to the changing religious/non-religious diversity of cultural communities in the Province. It also allows for all students to understand Quebec's religious history (MELS ERC Curriculum LEARN QUEBEC). The program's twin paramount principles are Recognition of Others and Pursuit of the Common Good. It is also claimed that the course will promote a "culture of dialogue" among students.

The project was adopted under the liberal government of Jean Charest, and has garnered some controversy. September 2008 marked the inauguration of this course.

In 2020, it was reported that the Coalition Avenir Québec (CAQ) government was going to replace the project with a new curriculum which would shift the focus from religion toward culture and citizenship. It would be replaced by 2024 with a new course, Culture et citoyenneté québécoise.

== Controversy ==
The course has been opposed by three main groups:

1. Secularists from the Mouvement laïque québécois (Quebec Secular Movement) because they believe that ethics and religious culture should not be taught within a single course; also, they believe that teaching both of these subjects together induce people to think that it is not possible to behave ethically without any religious belief;
2. French nationalists who accuse the program of being a kind of Multiculturalism 101;
3. The Coalition pour la liberté en éducation (Coalition for Freedom in Education), a coalition of parents drawn from different denominations who condemn the course for different reasons: they see it as relativistic, contrary to their faith.

Many condemned the fact that the State is imposing a vision of morals and religion (or lack thereof), which has traditionally been the purview of parents.

== Court cases ==
Two legal challenges were launched against the compulsory nature of this course.

=== Public school exemption ===
A court case against the ERC curriculum was heard from 11 to 15 May 2009 in Quebec's Superior Court in Drummondville. Two Catholic parents were challenging the school's refusal of an exemption for both their first grader and their sixteen-year-old who was in last year of high school. They were arguing that the course's contents put their children's faith at risk by being premature, relativistic and polytheistic, and teaching ethics detached from the parents' moral framework. It was seen as a test case for Quebec parents.

The parents lost their court case and decided to bring their cause to the Supreme Court of Canada.

==== Supreme Court ====
The Supreme Court granted the parents leave to appeal, but on hearing the merits determined that the appellants were unable to prove their case.

The case was heard on 18 May 2011 by the highest tribunal in Canada.

Apart from the original parties, 8 additional parties were granted the status of interveners (a pointer is supplied to the party's factum):

1. Christian Legal Fellowship;
2. Canadian Civil Liberties Association;
3. Coalition pour la liberté en éducation;
4. Evangelical Fellowship of Canada;
5. Regroupement chrétien pour le droit parental en éducation;
6. Canadian Council of Christian Charities;
7. Fédération des commissions scolaires du Québec (did not present oral arguments);
8. Canadian Catholic School Trustees' Association.

The Evangelical Fellowship of Canada wrote a FAQ in layman's terms explaining what it saw as the issues at stake and how this court case differs from the Loyola one. Two court reports were published, one in English by a writer of the Catholic register, another more detailed in French by a parent in favour of parents being exempt of this course if they so wish.

The Supreme Court heard the case and ruled that "... [the court] cannot conclude that the appellants have been able to prove their case."

The parents were awarded the Catholics Civil Right League's yearly award for their defense of parents' free choice in education.

=== Private school exemption ===
A private Catholic high school, Loyola High School, also launched a court challenge. Loyola High was challenging the fact that the Ministry of Education has not allowed it to teach what it deems an equivalent ethics and religion course better fitting the Catholic outlook of the school. It alleged that the Ministry had done so despite provisions in the law that would allow such an equivalent course.

Loyola High won its court case at the Supreme Court of Canada and is now exempt for the ERC course. It may teach its equivalent Catholic course. On 18 June 2010, Superior Court Justice Gerard Dugre compared the attempt of the education minister to impose a secular emphasis on Loyola High School's teaching of the course to the intolerance of the Spanish Inquisition: "The obligation imposed on Loyola to teach the ethics and religious culture course in a lay fashion assumes a totalitarian character essentially equivalent to Galileo's being ordered by the Inquisition to deny the Copernican universe," the judge wrote in his 63-page decision

== Surveys ==
Several polls had shown the Quebec population to be polarized around this course. While 45% opposed the course in October 2008, 72% wanted parents to be able to choose the moral and religious training their children will get at school: the new ERC course or a traditional denominational religion course. In May 2009, the proportion of Quebecers wanting this choice had risen to 76%.

== Jewish community response ==
On May 28, 2009, the Canadian Jewish News announced the formation of a grassroots organization to represent "a response of Orthodox Judaism to the Ethics and Religious Culture program." The organization, calling itself the Council on Jewish Education in Quebec, commended the Quebec government for championing the cause of universal friendship among human beings, and for identifying "Recognition of Others" and "Pursuit of the Common Good" as values to be taught. However, the organization contended that because Orthodox Jews are required according to Torah law to limit their study of theology to the theology of the Torah, the curriculum should consist of the Noahide Code. The "Hade'ah Vihaddibur" online Orthodox Jewish weekly newspaper reported a comparable sentiment expressed by the Israeli halakhic decisor Yosef Shalom Eliashiv. Consistent with this response, the Montreal Gazette, in an op-ed published on June 6, 2009 (p. B6), noted that Quebec Jewish school curricula are exclusively loyal to the theology of the Torah.
