= Brigitte Laganière =

Canadian ice hockey player (born 1996)

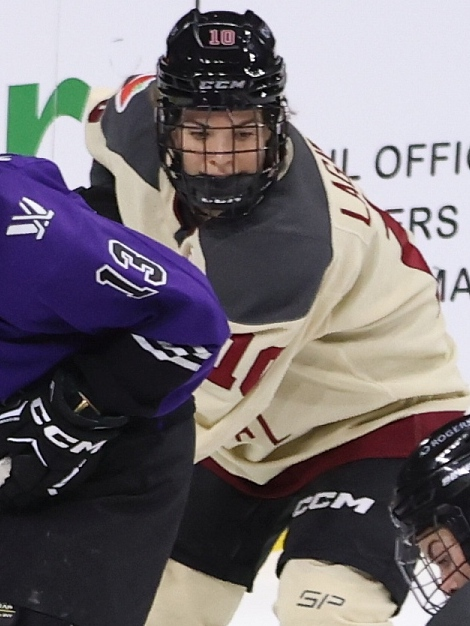
- Laganière with PWHL Montreal in 2024
- Born: August 1, 1996 (age 30) Montreal, Quebec, Canada
- Height: 5 ft 4 in (163 cm)
- Position: Defence
- Shot: Left
- Played for: PWHL Montreal; Montreal Force
- Playing career: 2016–2024

Brigitte Laganière (born August 1, 1996) is a Canadian former professional ice hockey defenceman who most recently played for PWHL Montreal of the Professional Women's Hockey League (PWHL). She previously played for the Montreal Force of the Premier Hockey Federation (PHF). She played college ice hockey at Concordia University.

== College career ==
On February 22, 2016, Laganière committed to play college ice hockey at Concordia University. She played ice hockey for the Concordia Stingers for five seasons. During the 2016–17 season, she recorded one goal and five assists in 20 games and was named to the RSEQ All-Rookie team. During the 2018–19 season, she recorded three goals and six assists in 20 games and was named a Second Team RSEQ All-Star. During the 2019–20 season, she recorded 18 assists in 20 games and was named a First Team RSEQ All-Star and a U Sports Second Team All-Canadian.

During the 2021–22 season, she recorded three goals and 14 assists in 15 games. Her 17 points ranked fifth in the league in scoring. She helped lead the Stingers win gold at the 2022 U Sports Women's Ice Hockey Championship. Following the season she was named a First Team RSEQ All-Star and a U Sports First Team All-Canadian. She became the first Stingers player to earn two all-Canadian honours. She also won the Leadership and Community Engagement Award and Denise Beaudet Award, for her leadership, community service and strong academics. Laganière, known and praised for her work ethic as well as her steady defensive ability, finished her career at Concordia with 8 goals and 50 assists totalling 58 points in 95 games which ranks her 12th all time in Career Points for the Stingers.

== Professional career ==
On October 6, 2022, Laganière signed a one-year contract with the Montreal Force of the PHF. During the 2022–23 season, she recorded one goal and three assists in 24 games. On May 7, 2023, she signed a two-year contract extension with the Force.

On December 27, 2023, she signed a one-year contract with PWHL Montreal. During the 2023–24 season, she recorded one assist in 17 regular season games. In July 2024, she announced her retirement.

== Career statistics ==
			Regular season					Playoffs
Season	Team	League	GP	G	A	Pts	PIM	GP	G	A	Pts	PIM
2016–17	Concordia University	RSEQ	20	1	5	6	10	—	—	—	—	—
2017–18	Concordia University	RSEQ	20	1	7	8	8	5	1	2	3	4
2018–19	Concordia University	RSEQ	20	3	6	9	4	2	0	0	0	0
2019–20	Concordia University	RSEQ	20	0	18	18	6	3	1	2	3	0
2021–22	Concordia University	RSEQ	15	3	14	17	6	4	1	2	3	2
2022–23	Montreal Force	PHF	24	1	3	4	17	—	—	—	—	—
2023–24	PWHL Montreal	PWHL	17	0	1	1	0	3	0	0	0	0
PHF totals			24	1	3	4	17	—	—	—	—	—
PWHL totals			17	0	1	1	0	3	0	0	0	0

== Personal life ==
Laganière is a member of the LGBTQ community.

Laganière is in a relationship with Nova Scotian Former Hockey Player Keriann Schofield, from Wolfville. Laganière & Schofield met as teammates while playing for the Concordia Stingers. The two currently live together in Montreal.
