= Collège Laflèche =

Coordinates: 46°20′58″N 72°33′27″W

Information
- School type: Private school
- Religious affiliation: Catholicism
- Established: 1969; 57 years ago
- Founders: Ursulines

Collège Laflèche (French pronunciation: [kɔlɛʒ laflɛʃ]) is a private college in Trois-Rivières, Quebec. The school is named for Catholic bishop Louis-François Richer Laflèche. The school was founded in 1969 by Ursuline nuns and is governed by the Ursuline institute.

It is the only private college in the Mauricie and Centre-du-Québec region to offer both vocational and pre-university programs.
