= Loyola College (Montreal) =

Former Jesuit college in Quebec, Canada

- Type: College
- Active: 1896–1974
- Religious affiliation: Roman Catholic (Jesuit)
- Academic affiliations: Université Laval (1903–1920); Université de Montréal (1920–1974)
- Location: Montreal, Quebec, Canada; 45.458°N 73.639°W
- Nickname: Loyola Warriors

Loyola College was a Jesuit college in Montreal, Quebec, Canada. It was founded in 1896 and ceased to exist as an independent institution in 1974 when it was incorporated into Concordia University. A portion of the original college remains as a separate entity called Loyola High School.

== History ==
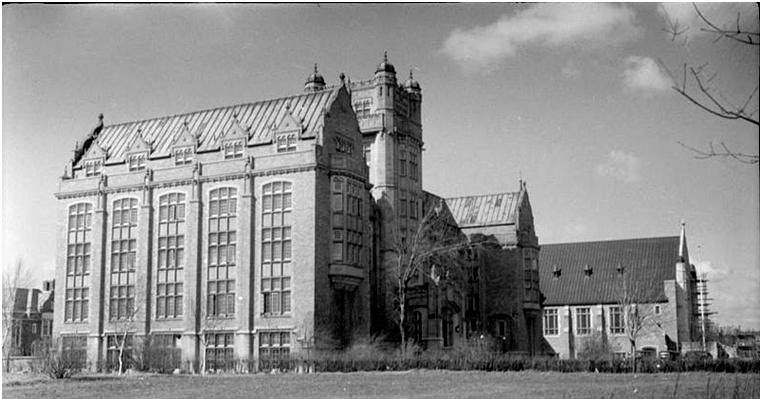
Loyola College Montreal in 1937

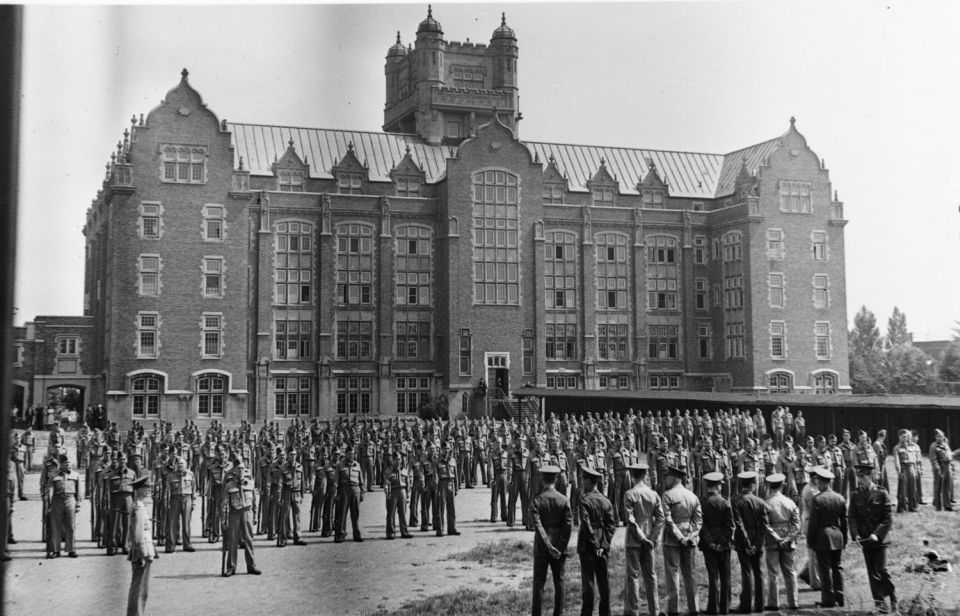
Canadian Officers Training Corps in front of Loyola college in 1940

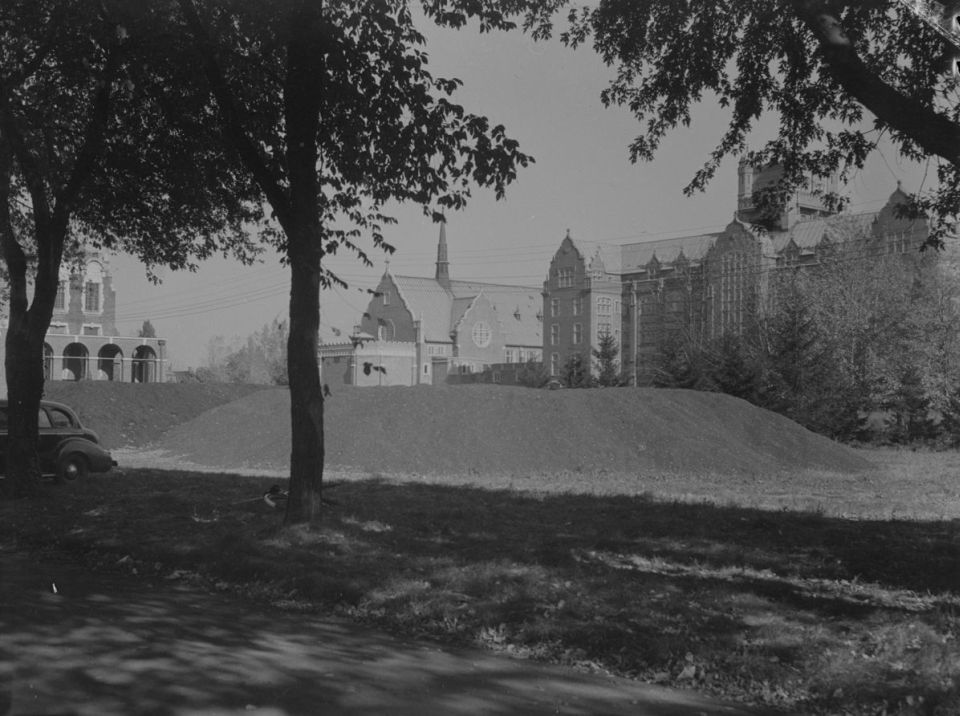
Loyola College in 1943 with stored coal in front

Loyola College traces its roots to an English-language program at the Jesuit Collège Sainte-Marie de Montréal (today part of the Université du Québec à Montréal) at the Sacred Heart Convent. In 1896, Loyola College was established at the corner of Bleury Street and Saint Catherine Street. Loyola College was named in honour of Ignatius of Loyola, founder of the Society of Jesus. In 1898, following a fire, the college was relocated, further west on Drummond Street, south of Saint Catherine. On March 10, 1899, the institution was incorporated by the Government of Quebec and became a full-fledged college. Although founded as a collège classique (the forerunners of Quebec's college system), Loyola began granting university degrees through Université Laval in 1903.

The college moved into the present west-end campus on Sherbrooke Street West in Notre-Dame-de-Grâce in 1916. Frank Peden (architect) with Walter J. Murray designed several Loyola College buildings: Administration Building (1913–16), Junior Building (1913–16), dormitories (1913–16) and refectory (1913–16). The construction was done by Anglin-Norcross Ltd. of Montréal. War memorial bronze plaques in the entrance hall are honour rolls dedicated to those from Loyola College who fought in the First and Second World Wars and the Korean War.

The School of Sociology opened in 1918. In 1920, the institution became affiliated with the Université de Montréal, which began granting degrees instead of Université Laval. Although associated with these universities in order to grant degrees, Loyola College nevertheless had full curriculum control.

The inter-war period was marked by the shift of education in the institution, the collège classique education was replaced by humanistic education (Liberal Arts College) in 1940, and Loyola became a four-year university. Loyola College never became a chartered university, and never had the ability to grant its own university degrees. Theology and philosophy were subjects taught to all students until 1972.

In 1940, the Faculty of Science and the Department of Engineering, which became a faculty in 1964, were created. In addition to providing the same undergraduate programs as other colleges, the institution also offered innovative fields of study at the time, such as exercise science and communication studies. Students could enrol in academic majors starting in 1953 and honours programs in 1958. Students graduating from Loyola could afterwards pursue graduate-level education in other universities, with a few earning Rhodes Scholarships.

Starting in 1958, Loyola also began offering its first evening courses for students not being able to go to school full-time. New courses were given in library science and faith community nursing.

Since its creation, Loyola College had welcomed almost exclusively young English-speaking Catholic men as students. It became co-ed in 1959 and became less homogeneous with the ever-increasing number of foreign students.

In 1964, the Loyola High School Corporation was founded to run Loyola High School separately from the college. In 1966, a new church was built outside of the school, St. Ignatius of Loyola Church. Before this, parishioners worshipped in a chapel within the school grounds. When Loyola College merged with Sir George Williams University in 1974, title to the land that Loyola High occupied was transferred from the college.

Obtaining a university charter was an important issue in the 1960s. Although many wanted Loyola College to become Loyola University, the Quebec government preferred to annex it to Sir George Williams University. Merger discussions began in 1968 and ended with the creation of Concordia University on August 24, 1974. Today, the Loyola Campus remains as a campus of Concordia University.

== Loyola Chapel ==
Loyola Chapel
- Concordia University Loyola Chapel
- Loyola Chapel
- Location: 7121 Sherbrooke St. W, Montreal, Quebec
- Country: Canada
- Denomination: Catholic

History
- Status: Theatre within Concordia University
- Consecrated: 1935

Architecture
- Architectural type: Gothic Revival architecture
- Style: Collegiate Gothic style

The Loyola Chapel is a place of Catholic denomination worship for students and staff and their families. The chapel is a classic example of Gothic Revival architecture. Charles William Kelsey created a 12-light stained glass war memorial window (1933) in the Loyola Chapel. The windows depict the torture of the priests by North American Indigenous peoples. In the dedication panel is written: "To the Greater Glory of God and In Memory of the Officers and Men of the 55th Irish Canadian Rangers." The basement beneath the Loyola Chapel has been converted into a theatre named the F.C. Smith Auditorium. The Loyola Chapel continues as a place of worship and is used for weddings and funeral services of all faiths; it is also used for yoga activities that are part of the curriculum. The large F.C. Smith Auditorium beneath the chapel has been converted into two parts: one for theatrical performances with stage facilities and one for motion pictures, both usually as parts of courses.

Location	Date	Description	Manufacturer	Inscription
Roman Catholic Chapel	1933	2 light -Jesuit-Martyrs: Isaac Jogues and Noel Chabanel	Charles William Kelsey	Badges of the Jesuit Order and the Irish Rangers Regiment are in the top corner areas of the war memorial window.
Roman Catholic Chapel	1933	4 light -Jesuit-Martyrs: Jean de Brébeuf, Antoine Daniel, Gabriel Lalemant and Charles Garnier	Charles William Kelsey	War memorial window
Roman Catholic Chapel	1933	4 light -Jesuit-Martyrs: Jean de la Lande and René Goupil	Charles William Kelsey	In the lower two corners of the war memorial windows are the Arms of the Loyola family.

== Loyola Warriors ==
The Loyola Warriors were the Canadian Interuniversity Athletics Union teams that represented Loyola College.

The Loyola Warriors men's soccer team won the Canadian University national championship in 1973.

Loyola merged with Sir George Williams University in 1974 to create Concordia University; the Warriors and the Sir George Williams Georgians were replaced by the Concordia Stingers.

Loyola High School remained in existence after the merger and retained the name Warriors for its senior sports teams.

== Notable alumni ==
- Roger Abbott, actor
- Warren Allmand, member of parliament
- Richard Appignanesi, writer and editor
- Francesco Bellini, scientist and businessman
- Tony Burman, academic
- Jos Canale, ice hockey coach
- Lucien Cardin, judge and politician
- Larry Carrière, ice hockey player and later administrator
- Bernard-Augustin Conroy, physician and politician
- Marcel Danis, lawyer and politician
- Bernard Devlin, film director
- Robert E. Dolan, conductor and composer
- Keith English, Canadian Football League player
- Don Ferguson, actor
- Hana Gartner, CBC journalist
- Marc Gervais, Jesuit priest, scholar and writer
- Léon Mercier Gouin, barrister, professor and politician
- Brian Iwata, psychologist
- Roman Jarymowycz, soldier and military educator
- Emmett Johns, priest and humanitarian
- Eric Kierans, economist and politician
- Brent Ladds, ice hockey administrator
- Bernard Lonergan, Jesuit priest and philosopher
- L. Ian MacDonald (born 1947), author, columnist, broadcaster, and diplomat
- John C. Major, puisne justice on the Supreme Court of Canada
- Brian McKenna, documentary filmmaker
- Richard Monette, actor and director
- Athol Murray, priest and ice hockey coach
- Louis Segatore, Canadian Football League player
- Brian Slattery, Professor of Law and academic
- Georges Vanier, Governor General of Canada

== See also ==
- Concordia University
- Sir George Williams College
- Loyola High School (Montreal)
- Collège Sainte-Marie
- List of Jesuit sites
