= Gerry James =

Canadian football and ice hockey player (1934–2024)

- Born: October 22, 1934; Regina, Saskatchewan, Canada
- Died: February 13, 2024 (aged 89); Parksville, British Columbia, Canada
- Relatives: Eddie James (father)
- Football career
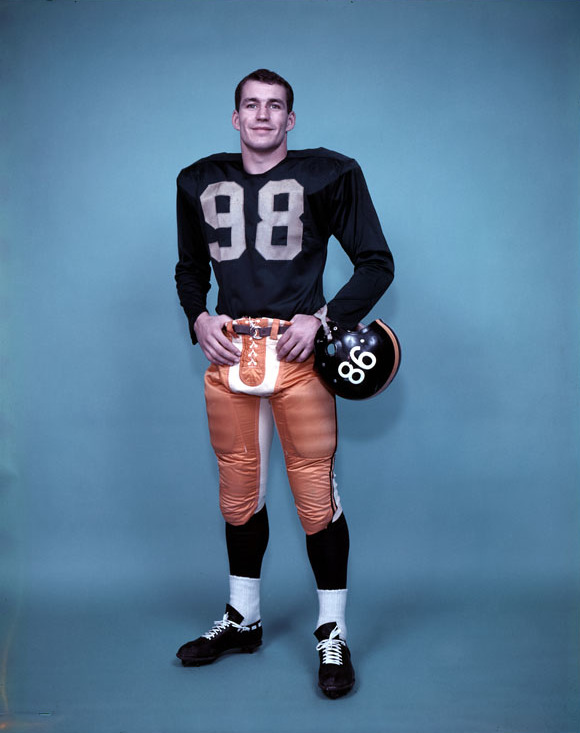
- James in 1958

No. 28
- Position: Running back

Career information
- High school: Kelvin High School

Career history
- 1952–1962: Winnipeg Blue Bombers
- 1964: Saskatchewan Roughriders

Awards and highlights
- 4× Grey Cup champion (1958, 1959, 1961, 1962); 2× CFL's Most Outstanding Canadian Award (1954, 1957); 2× Dave Dryburgh Memorial Trophy (1957, 1960); 2× CFL West All-Star (1955, 1957); Manitoba Sports Hall of Fame (1982)
- Canadian Football Hall of Fame (Class of 1981)
Ice hockey career
- Height: 5 ft 11 in (180 cm)
- Weight: 185 lb (84 kg; 13 st 3 lb)
- Position: Right wing
- Shot: Right
- Played for: Toronto Maple Leafs
- Playing career: 1954–1961

Edwin Fitzgerald James (October 22, 1934 – February 13, 2024) was a Canadian professional football and ice hockey player. He played as a running back for the Winnipeg Blue Bombers of the Canadian Football League (CFL) between 1952 and 1964 and as a right winger for the Toronto Maple Leafs of the National Hockey League (NHL) between 1955 and 1960. He is a member of the Canadian Football Hall of Fame, like his father, Eddie James, who also played for the Blue Bombers. James was born in Regina, Saskatchewan.

In a period overlapping the 1959 CFL season and 1959–60 NHL season, James became the only player to play in the CFL's Grey Cup (November 28, 1959 – won cup) and the NHL's Stanley Cup Final (first game April 9, 1960 – lost cup) in the same season.

== Football career ==
A graduate of Kelvin High School in Winnipeg, James started his CFL career in 1952 when he became one of the youngest players ever to play in the CFL, at only 17 years old. (Tom Manastersky was several months younger when he joined the Montreal Alouettes in 1946).

As a kicker and a running back in the Bombers' powerful "run by committee" system, James helped the team to six Grey Cup appearances (1953, 1957, 1958, 1959, 1961, and 1962), earning four victories (1958, 1959, 1961 and 1962). This committee system over the years included Lorne Benson, Tom Casey, Leo Lewis, Bob McNamara and Charlie Shepard.

In the 1957 season, James scored 19 touchdowns, one short of the record set a year earlier by Pat Abbruzzi. He did however set a CFL record with 18 rushing touchdowns, which stood alone until it was tied by Jim Germany in 1981 and was finally surpassed by Mike Pringle with 19 in the 2000 season. James rushed the ball 197 times for 1,192 yards that season. He was part of the Blue Bombers until 1963, then played in 1964 with the Saskatchewan Roughriders.

When he retired from the CFL, James was the second all-time leading Canadian running back with totals of 994 carries for 5,554 yards and 57 touchdowns, behind only Normie Kwong. James was a two-time winner – 1954 and 1957 – of the CFL's Most Outstanding Canadian award. He was also the second Canadian born player to rush for over 1000 yards in a season (by only 9 days) when he tallied 1205 yards in 1955. (Note: On October 24, 1955 Gerry James became the second Canadian born player to top 1000 yards in a season, rushing for 143 yards against the BC Lions. Normie Kwong was the first Canadian born player to rush for 1000 yards in a season, doing so on October 15, 1955 against the Saskatchewan Roughriders, gaining 56 yards for 1028 total, but James' total of 1080 became the new single season record, alas for only 5 days. Not to be out done, Kwong took the record back during the last game of the season on October 29, rushing for 192 yards against the Calgary Stampeders and finishing with 1250 yards. James rushed for 131 yards against Saskatchewan on Oct. 29, good for 1205 yards on the season. See: Second Stringers Clash and Riders Top Esks 4-3, Calgary Herald, Oct. 17, 1955, p.28 AND WIFU Playoffs Set; Als, Ticats Get Wins, Calgary Herald, Oct. 24, 1955, p.24 AND Lions Counted Out, Calgary Herald, Oct. 25, 1955, p.24 AND Kwong Blasts Inept Stamps, Calgary Herald, Oct. 31, 1955, p.32 AND Riders Wallop Bombers, by Al Vickery, Calgary Herald, Oct. 31, 1955, p.32)

James was inducted into the Canadian Football Hall of Fame in 1981, joining his father, Eddie James, who was inducted in 1963.

== Hockey career ==
James was also a professional ice hockey right winger who played a total of 164 games in the National Hockey League for the Toronto Maple Leafs over five seasons in the late 50s (1954-55 to 1959-60), playing in 149 regular season games and 15 playoff games, finishing with 41 career points (15 goals and 26 assists).

At the age of 16, James played with the Winnipeg Monarchs junior hockey team in the 1951 Memorial Cup (a loss). The Toronto Maple Leafs, who owned James' professional hockey rights, decided to move him to Toronto to play for the Toronto Marlboros, their top junior team. James would win the 1955 Memorial Cup playing with the Marlboros – only a few months after winning the CFL's Most Outstanding Canadian award. A few days after the Memorial Cup win, James also played his first NHL game with the Maple Leafs – ending a tremendous series of multi-sport and multi-league achievements within five months.

In the 1955–56 NHL season, immediately after rushing for a career-high season of 1,205 yards and being chosen a Western All-Star for the 1955 Canadian football season, James rejoined the NHL's Maple Leafs for their last 51 games, including a 5-game run in the Stanley Cup playoffs.

James played a career-high 53 games in the 1956–57 NHL season, also marking his biggest season for NHL goals (4), assists (12), points (16) and penalty minutes (90).

The following 1957 football season saw James win his second Most Outstanding Canadian award on November 29, play in the CFL's 1957 Grey Cup Championship the afternoon of November 30 in Toronto, and that same night play his first game of the 1957–58 NHL season with the Maple Leafs.

James played only 15 games with the Maple Leafs in the 1957–58 NHL season, being sent to the team's Rochester Americans farm team for a further 15 games. He was only able to join the Maple Leafs in a management role for the 1958–59 NHL season, due to a leg injury suffered in the 1958 CFL season.

In the 1959–60 NHL season, immediately after winning the CFL's 1959 Grey Cup, James rejoined the NHL's Maple Leafs as a player for their last 44 games, including a 10-game run into the 1960 Stanley Cup Final. With his on-field and on-ice play between November 1959, and April 1960, James became the only player in history to play in the Grey Cup and Stanley Cup Final in the same season.

The Maple Leafs did not use James in the 1960-61 season, lending him to the Winnipeg Warriors in the minor pro Western Hockey League for his last year of professional hockey.

James played some senior ice hockey in Saskatchewan over the next few years, then became a Tier II/Junior A head coach in 1973 in the Saskatchewan Junior Hockey League (SJHL). Over twelve years, James coached eight SJHL seasons with the Yorkton Terriers, the Melville Millionaires and the Estevan Bruins. He coached these teams to seven winning seasons and a lifetime record of 249 wins, 191 losses, and 14 ties for a 0.622 winning percentage. He just missed a perfect sweep of winning seasons when his 1979-80 Melville Millionaires finished a half-game below 0.500: 29–30–1. James later coached the 1988-89 season with the Moose Jaw Warriors of the major junior Western Hockey League.

== Retirement and death ==
When he retired from competitive football, James remained active in hockey. In 1963, he coached in Switzerland and managed hockey teams in Yorkton, Melville, and Moose Jaw of the Saskatchewan Junior Hockey League in the 1980s. James later resided in British Columbia. James was a member of the Allwood Finishers, Dart Team in Parksville on Vancouver Island, from 2015. In 2017 the Allwood Finishers won the District 69 Dart League "A" Division Championship trophy for the second year in a row.

James died in Parksville, British Columbia on February 13, 2024, at the age of 89.

== Awards and achievements ==
- 1955 Memorial Cup Championship winner
- CFL's Most Outstanding Canadian Award, 1954 and 1957
- CFL Grey Cup Championship winner, 1958, 1959, 1961 and 1962
- Manitoba Sports Hall of Fame and Museum, inducted 1982.
- Selected as one of the Blue Bombers All-Time Greats.

== Career CFL regular season rushing statistics ==
Year	Team	Rush	Yards	Y/R	TD	LG
1952	Winnipeg Blue Bombers	10	93	9.3	2	25
1953	Winnipeg Blue Bombers	25	120	4.8	1	21
1954	Winnipeg Blue Bombers	106	576	5.4	4	71
1955	Winnipeg Blue Bombers	189	1205	6.4	7	60
1956	Winnipeg Blue Bombers	-	DNP	-	-	-
1957	Winnipeg Blue Bombers	197	1192	6.1	18	74
1958	Winnipeg Blue Bombers	64	372	5.8	2	21
1959	Winnipeg Blue Bombers	49	261	5.3	6	44
1960	Winnipeg Blue Bombers	165	872	5.3	9	28
1961	Winnipeg Blue Bombers	102	505	5	4	26
1962	Winnipeg Blue Bombers	84	345	4.1	5	15
1964	Saskatchewan Roughriders	4	13	3.3	0	7
	CFL Totals	995	5554	5.6	58	74

== NHL Regular season and playoffs statistics ==
			Regular season					Playoffs
Season	Team	League	GP	G	A	Pts	PIM	GP	G	A	Pts	PIM
1951–52	Toronto Marlboros	OHA	3	0	0	0	4	6	2	5	7	14
1952–53	Toronto Marlboros	OHA	49	19	15	34	141	7	0	1	1	20
1953–54	Toronto Marlboros	OHA	41	23	17	40	123	15	8	2	10	26
1954–55	Toronto Maple Leafs	NHL	1	0	0	0	0	—	—	—	—	—
1954–55	Toronto Marlboros	OHA	38	8	13	21	60	13	4	4	8	28
1954–55	Toronto Marlboros	M-Cup	—	—	—	—	—	11	1	3	4	54
1955–56	Toronto Maple Leafs	NHL	46	3	5	8	50	5	1	0	1	8
1956–57	Toronto Maple Leafs	NHL	53	4	12	16	90	—	—	—	—	—
1957–58	Toronto Maple Leafs	NHL	15	3	2	5	61	—	—	—	—	—
1957–58	Rochester Americans	AHL	15	2	4	6	46	—	—	—	—	—
1959–60	Toronto Maple Leafs	NHL	34	4	9	13	56	10	0	0	0	0
1960–61	Winnipeg Warriors	WHL	26	2	7	9	50	—	—	—	—	—
1964–65	Yorkton Terriers	SSHL	36	11	31	42	89	11	0	4	4	43
1965–66	Yorkton Terriers	SSHL	29	11	22	33	91	5	3	1	4	17
1966–67	Yorkton Terriers	SSHL	35	13	21	34	85	4	1	5	6	4
1971–72	Yorkton Terriers	PrsHL	40	8	30	38	143	—	—	—	—	—
NHL totals			149	14	26	40	257	15	1	0	1	8
