= Ron Latourelle =

Former Canadian football player

Profile
- Positions: Punt returner, Running back, Defensive back

Personal information
- Born: May 17, 1934 (age 92)
- Listed height: 5 ft 8 in (1.73 m)
- Listed weight: 180 lb (82 kg)

Career history
- 1955–1964: Winnipeg Blue Bombers

Awards and highlights
- 4× Grey Cup champion (1958, 1959, 1961, 1962)

Ron "Pepe" Latourelle (born May 17, 1934) is a former Canadian Football League punt returner and reserve running back for the Winnipeg Blue Bombers from 1955 to 1964, participating in four Grey Cup victories.

Ron Latourelle played high school and junior football in Winnipeg before joining the Winnipeg Blue Bombers in 1955, mostly useful as a punt returner but also as a reserve running back and defensive back. As a punt returner, Latourelle reached highs in 1958 and 1962, returning 80 and 68 punts, respectively. In his career, he played all 16 games for six years out of 10 and scored 11 touchdowns, six on rushes and five on passes. He was part of four Grey Cup winning teams (1958, 1959, 1961 and 1962). In particular, he played an important part in the 49th Grey Cup of 1961 when he replaced the starting halfback, Ray Jauch.
