= Cornel Piper =

Canadian football player (1937–2018)

Profile
- Position: Tackle

Personal information
- Born: April 2, 1937; Ardmore, Alberta, Canada
- Died: September 2, 2018 (aged 81); Comox, British Columbia, Canada

Career history
- 1957–1967: Winnipeg Blue Bombers

Awards and highlights
- 4× Grey Cup champion (1958, 1959, 1961, 1962); 2× CFL West All-Star (1960, 1961)

Cornel Piper (April 2, 1937 – September 2, 2018) was a Canadian professional football offensive lineman in the Canadian Football League from 1957 to 1967 for the Winnipeg Blue Bombers, named a western conference all-star at offensive guard in 1960 and 1961. He played in all 16 regular season games throughout his career except for his last 2 years.

Piper won four Grey Cups with Winnipeg.

He died on September 2, 2018.
