= Roger Savoie =

Profile
- Position: Defensive lineman

Personal information
- Born: July 29, 1931; Saint Boniface, Manitoba, Canada
- Died: August 17, 2009 (aged 78); Winnipeg, Manitoba, Canada
- Listed height: 6 ft 0 in (1.83 m)
- Listed weight: 230 lb (104 kg)

Career history
- 1951–1965: Winnipeg Blue Bombers

Awards and highlights
- 4× Grey Cup champion (1958, 1959, 1961, 1962); CFL West All-Star (1962); Manitoba Sports Hall of Fame; Blue Bombers Hall of Fame

Roger Rene Joseph Savoie (July 29, 1931 – August 17, 2009) was a defensive lineman who played fifteen seasons in the Canadian Football League for the Winnipeg Blue Bombers. In 2005 he was inducted into the Manitoba Sports Hall of Fame and Museum.
