= Herb Gray (Canadian football) =

American gridiron football player (1934–2011)

Profile
- Positions: Defensive end, Guard

Personal information
- Born: June 12, 1934; Goosecreek, Texas, U.S.
- Died: January 21, 2011 (aged 76); San Antonio, Texas, U.S.

Career information
- College: Texas
- NFL draft: 1956: 5th round, 55th overall pick

Career history
- 1956–1965: Winnipeg Blue Bombers

Awards and highlights
- 4× Grey Cup champion (1958, 1959, 1961, 1962); CFL All-Star (1962); 6× CFL West All-Star (1957–1962); First-team All-American (1955); First-team All-SWC (1955); Second-team All-SWC (1953); Southwest Conference Co-Champion (1953); Houston Post Southwest Conference Defensive MVP (1953)
- Canadian Football Hall of Fame (Class of 1983)

Herbert William Gray (June 12, 1934 – January 21, 2011) was a Canadian Football Hall of Fame football player who in the 1950s and 1960s won four Grey Cups and played for two others; and was named the Winnipeg Blue Bombers Defensive Player of the Half Century and to the Canadian Football League's (CFL) All-Time All-Star team at defensive end. He made all-star teams as both an offensive lineman and defensive end and was the first defensive player to win the league's Outstanding Lineman award. Prior to that he was an All-American football player at the University of Texas and helped them to win a share of the 1953 Southwest Conference (SWC) Championship.

== College ==
After having played high school football in Houston, Gray became a three-year letterman at Texas. He played on the 1953 SWC co-championship team that finished ranked No. 8 in the nation and was 2nd Team All-Conference as a tackle. In his senior year he was a team captain, and named first team all-conference by the AP and a Football Writers Association of America All-American.

He played in the 1956 Senior Bowl and was drafted 55th overall in the fifth round of the 1956 NFL draft by the Baltimore Colts but chose to play in the CFL instead.

== CFL ==
As a member of the Winnipeg Blue Bombers, Gray played defensive end and offensive guard. In 10 years, Gray was a CFL All-Star as a defensive end once and a Western conference all-star 6 times, also the first defensive end to win the Schenley Award as the CFL's most outstanding lineman in 1960. His team won 5 Western Conference titles in 6 years (1957–1962) and 4 Grey Cup championship games, the 46th Grey Cup of 1958, the 47th Grey Cup of 1959, the 49th Grey Cup of 1961, the 50th Grey Cup of 1962. His team lost the 45th Grey Cup of 1957 and the 53rd Grey Cup of 1965. Gray was the Blue Bombers defensive captain for 9 years.

== Awards ==
For his achievements, Herb Gray won the Dr. Bert Oja most valuable Bomber lineman award in 1965 and named the Blue Bombers Defensive Player of the Half-Century in 1980. Gray was inducted into the Canadian Football Hall of Fame and the Texas Longhorns Hall of Honor in 1983, into the Winnipeg Football Hall of Fame in 1984 and into the Manitoba Sports Hall of Fame and Museum in 1995.

== Later life ==
Gray moved to San Antonio, Texas in 1971 and worked in the Cement business until he retired in 1999 and retired to Canyon Lake, Texas. He died in 2011 and was buried in Clare, Iowa.

== Videos ==
- Canadian Football Hall of Famer on YouTube
