= Gord Rowland =

Canadian football player (1930–2018)

No. 27/97
- Positions: Linebacker, Defensive back

Personal information
- Born: September 1, 1930; Montreal, Quebec, Canada
- Died: October 1, 2018 (aged 88)
- Listed height: 5 ft 10 in (1.78 m)
- Listed weight: 172 lb (78 kg)

Career information
- High school: William Dawson (Montreal, QC)

Career history
- 1954–1964: Winnipeg Blue Bombers

Awards and highlights
- 4× Grey Cup champion (1958, 1959, 1961, 1962); CFL All-Star (1962); 6× CFL West All-Star (1955, 1957, 1958, 1960, 1961, 1962); Manitoba Sports Hall of Fame (1997); Blue Bombers Hall of Fame

Gordon Rowland (September 1, 1930 – October 1, 2018) was a two-sport national champion in soccer and Canadian football. He won the Challenge Trophy in soccer with Montréal Stelco and the Grey Cup in the Canadian Football League with the Winnipeg Blue Bombers.

In 1997 he was inducted into the Manitoba Sports Hall of Fame and Museum.

He died on October 1, 2018.
