= John Barrow (Canadian football) =

American gridiron football player (1935–2015)

Profile
- Positions: Defensive tackle, Offensive tackle

Personal information
- Born: October 31, 1935; Delray Beach, Florida, U.S.
- Died: February 17, 2015 (aged 79); Missouri City, Texas, U.S.
- Listed height: 6 ft 2 in (1.88 m)
- Listed weight: 255 lb (116 kg)

Career information
- College: Florida
- NFL draft: 1957: 5th round, 59th overall pick

Career history
- 1957–1970: Hamilton Tiger-Cats

Awards and highlights
- 4× Grey Cup champion (1957, 1963, 1965, 1967); 6× CFL All-Star (1962–1967); 12× CFL East All-Star (1957–1967, 1969); CFL Lineman of the Century (1967); First-team All-American (1956); First-team All-SEC (1956)
- Canadian Football Hall of Fame (Class of 1976)

John B. Barrow (October 31, 1935 – February 17, 2015) was an American college and professional football player who was an offensive and defensive tackle in the Canadian Football League (CFL) for fourteen seasons in the 1950s, 1960s and 1970s. Barrow played college football for the University of Florida, and was recognized as an All-American. Thereafter, he played professionally for the Hamilton Tiger-Cats of the CFL, and was later inducted into the Canadian Football Hall of Fame.

== Early life and college ==
Barrow was born in Delray Beach, Florida, in 1935. He attended the University of Florida in Gainesville, Florida, where he was an offensive and defensive lineman for coach Bob Woodruff's Florida Gators football team from 1954 to 1956. As a senior in 1956, he was a first-team All-Southeastern Conference (SEC) selection, a Football Writers Association of America first-team All-American, and the Gators' team captain. Barrow was later inducted into the University of Florida Athletic Hall of Fame as a "Gator Great."

== Professional career ==
The Detroit Lions of the National Football League (NFL) selected Barrow in the fifth round (59th pick overall) of the 1957 NFL draft, but he opted to play in the CFL instead. He played for the Hamilton Tiger-Cats from 1957 to 1970 as a defensive tackle and offensive tackle. He was an All-Star 11 times on defence and 4 times on offence and was voted the CFL "lineman of the century" in 1967. Barrow was a member of four Grey Cup-winning Tiger-Cats teams (1957, 1963, 1965, 1967), and played in five other Grey Cup championship games (1958, 1959, 1961, 1962, 1964).

Retiring as a player after the 1970 season, Barrow became the Toronto Argonauts general manager from 1971 to 1975. He was inducted into the Canadian Football Hall of Fame in 1976, and was voted one of the CFL's top 50 players (17th) of all-time in a poll conducted by Canadian sports network TSN in 2006. Barrow died February 17, 2015, at his home in Missouri City, Texas; he was 79 years old.

== See also ==
- 1956 College Football All-America Team
- Florida Gators
- Florida Gators football, 1950–59
- List of Canadian Football Hall of Fame inductees
- List of Florida Gators football All-Americans
- List of University of Florida alumni
- List of University of Florida Athletic Hall of Fame members
