= Leo Lewis (running back) =

American gridiron football player (1933–2013)

No. 29
- Position: Running back

Personal information
- Born: February 4, 1933; Des Moines, Iowa, U.S.
- Died: August 30, 2013 (aged 80); Columbia, Missouri, U.S.
- Listed height: 5 ft 10 in (1.78 m)
- Listed weight: 196 lb (89 kg)

Career information
- College: Lincoln (MO)
- NFL draft: 1955: 6th round, 64th overall pick

Career history
- 1955–1966: Winnipeg Blue Bombers

Awards and highlights
- 4× Grey Cup champion (1958, 1959, 1961, 1962); Grey Cup MVP (1962); CFL All-Star (1962); 6× CFL West All-Star (1955, 1958, 1960, 1961, 1962, 1964); 2× First-team Little All-American (1953, 1954)
- Canadian Football Hall of Fame (Class of 1973)
- College Football Hall of Fame

Leo Everett Lewis Jr. (February 4, 1933 – August 30, 2013) was an American gridiron football player and coach. He played college football as a running back for Lincoln University in Jefferson City, Missouri, from 1951 to 1954 and professionally with the Winnipeg Blue Bombers of the Canadian Football League (CFL) from 1955 to 1966. He served as the head football coach at his alma mater, Lincoln, from 1973 to 1975.

== Playing career ==
=== College ===
As a halfback at Lincoln University in Jefferson City, Missouri, Lewis was nicknamed "The Lincoln Locomotive". He set school records for touchdowns in a season (22), touchdowns in a career (64), rushing yards in a season (1,239) and career rushing yards (4,457).

=== CFL ===
After a stellar college career, Lewis signed with the Winnipeg Blue Bombers of the Canadian Football League (CFL). He was named All-Pro six times and was a member of four Grey Cup-winning Blue Bombers teams. He missed the 1956 season with a serious ankle injury. During his 11-year career in the CFL, he rushed for 8,861 yards with a 6.6 yard average. He also was a remarkable kick-returner, averaging 29.1 yards on kickoff returns in his CFL career. His career rushing total of 8,861 yards stood as a Winnipeg Blue Bomber record for 41 years until it was passed by Charles Roberts in 2007. His career totals in return yardage, and yards per carry, still stand as Blue Bombers records.

=== Career regular season rushing statistics ===
CFL statistics			Rushing				
Year	Team	GP	Rush	Yards	Y/R	Lg	TD
1955	Winnipeg Blue Bombers		135	834	6.2	41	5
1956	Winnipeg Blue Bombers		-	injury	-	-	-
1957	Winnipeg Blue Bombers		119	817	6.9	69	5
1958	Winnipeg Blue Bombers		167	1164	7.0	47	8
1959	Winnipeg Blue Bombers		112	730	6.5	37	2
1960	Winnipeg Blue Bombers		106	923	8.7	85	5
1961	Winnipeg Blue Bombers		146	1036	7.1	63	8
1962	Winnipeg Blue Bombers		134	865	6.5	83	4
1963	Winnipeg Blue Bombers		133	691	5.2	92	3
1964	Winnipeg Blue Bombers	15	114	845	7.4	87	3
1965	Winnipeg Blue Bombers	16	154	828	5.4	33	5
1965	Winnipeg Blue Bombers	5	31	128	4.1	10	0
	CFL totals	-	1351	8861	6.6	92	48

== Coaching career ==
Lewis worked briefly for the United States Department of Agriculture and was an assistant coach at Hickman High School in Hickman High School in Columbia, Missouri. He returned to his alma mater, Lincoln University, in 1968 as an assistant football coach under Dwight T. Reed. Lewis succeeded Reed as head football coach in 1973. He resigned from his post as head football coach in January 1976, after leading the Lincoln Blue Tigers to a record of 12–21 in three seasons.

Lewis also coached golf and was a physical educations instructor at Lincoln. He was the head coach of the women's basketball team from 1981 to 1993, compiling a record of 104–206 in 12 seasons. Lewis later served as the interim athletic director at Lincoln.

=== Head coaching record ===
Year	Team	Overall	Conference	Standing	Bowl/playoffs
Lincoln Blue Tigers (Missouri Intercollegiate Athletic Association) (1973–1975)
1973	Lincoln	5–6	3–3	T–3rd	
1974	Lincoln	3–8 (Note: Lincoln's 1974 overall record includes a forfeit from Arkansas–Pine Bluff.)	0–6	7th	
1975	Lincoln	4–7	2–4	T–5th	
Lincoln:		12–21	5–3		
Total:		12–21			

== Honors ==
Lewis was inducted into the Canadian Football Hall of Fame in 1973 and the College Football Hall of Fame in August 2005. In 2005, he was named to 20 All-Time Blue Bombers Greats, to commemorate the 75th anniversary of Blue Bombers franchise. Lewis was inducted into the Manitoba Sports Hall of Fame and Museum in 2005, was inducted into the Black College Football Hall of Fame in February 2018, and the Missouri Sports Hall Of Fame in 2019.

== Family and death ==
Lewis had three children, two of whom played professional football. Leo Lewis III played as a wide receiver for Calgary Stampeders and Hamilton Tiger-Cats of the CFL and the Minnesota Vikings and Cleveland Browns of the National Football League (NFL). Marc Lewis also played as a wide receiver, the for Denver Gold and Oakland Invaders of the United States Football League (USFL) and the CFL's Ottawa Rough Riders and the Calgary Stampeders and Barry Lewis.

Lewis died on August 30, 2013, at his home in Columbia, Missouri. He had been battling an illness for some time.
