= Norm Rauhaus =

Canadian football player (1935–2018)

Profile
- Positions: Safety, wide receiver

Personal information
- Born: November 4, 1935; Winnipeg, Manitoba, Canada
- Died: November 26, 2018 (aged 83); Winnipeg, Manitoba, Canada
- Listed height: 6 ft 1 in (1.85 m)
- Listed weight: 195 lb (88 kg)

Career information
- College: none - Weston Wildcats (Jr.)

Career history
- 1956–1967: Winnipeg Blue Bombers

Awards and highlights
- 4× Grey Cup champion (1958, 1959, 1961, 1962); Dr. Beattie Martin Trophy (1956); CFL West All-Star (1961)

Norm Rauhaus (November 4, 1935 – November 26, 2018) was a Grey Cup champion safety and flanker who played in the Canadian Football League for the Winnipeg Blue Bombers from 1956 to 1967.

A native of Winnipeg, Rauhaus joined his hometown Blue Bombers in 1956 and, with 4 interceptions, was winner of the Dr. Beattie Martin Trophy for Canadian rookie of the year in the west. He played 12 seasons, intercepting 37 passes, catching 34 passes, and scoring three touchdowns; he was an All-Star in 1961. As a dependable Canadian starter, he was an indispensable part of four Grey Cup victories. Rauhaus died in Winnipeg in 2018, aged 83.
