= Garland Warren =

Canadian gridiron football player (1935–2010)

Profile
- Positions: Centre, Linebacker

Personal information
- Born: May 19, 1935; Bomarton, Texas, U.S.
- Died: May 3, 2010 (aged 74); Martindale, Texas, U.S.
- Listed height: 6 ft 1 in (1.85 m)
- Listed weight: 220 lb (100 kg)

Career history
- 1958–1964: Winnipeg Blue Bombers

Awards and highlights
- 4× Grey Cup champion (1958, 1959, 1961, 1962)

J. Garland Warren (May 19, 1935 – May 3, 2010) was an American professional football player who played for the Winnipeg Blue Bombers. He won the Grey Cup with Winnipeg in 1958, 1959, 1961 and 1962. He played college football at the University of North Texas. In 2010, he died, aged 74.
