= Zeke Pusteinick =

Canadian football player

Profile
- Position: Tackle

Personal information
- Listed height: 6 ft 3 in (1.91 m)
- Listed weight: 225 lb (102 kg)

Career history
- 1957: Hamilton Tiger-Cats

Awards and highlights
- Grey Cup champion (1957)

Zeke Pusteinick was a Canadian football player who played for the Hamilton Tiger-Cats. He won the Grey Cup with them in 1957.
