= Joe Lukas =

Canadian football player

Profile
- Position: LB

Personal information
- Listed height: 5 ft 11 in (1.80 m)
- Listed weight: 172 lb (78 kg)

Career history
- 1956–1957: Hamilton Tiger-Cats

Awards and highlights
- Grey Cup champion (1957)

Joe Lukasawiecz was a Canadian football player who played for the Hamilton Tiger-Cats. He won the Grey Cup with them in 1957.
