= Bud Grant =

American football player and coach (1927–2023)

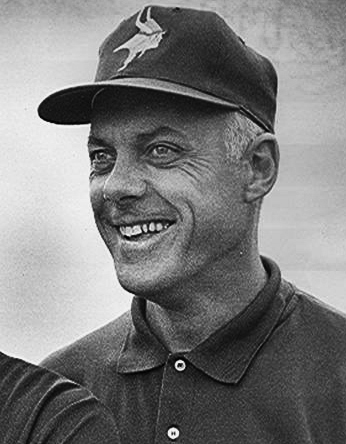
- Grant with the Minnesota Vikings in 1968
- Born: Harry Peter Grant Jr. May 20, 1927; Superior, Wisconsin, U.S.
- Died: March 11, 2023 (aged 95); Bloomington, Minnesota, U.S.
- Football career

No. 86
- Positions: End, defensive end

Personal information
- Listed height: 6 ft 3 in (1.91 m)
- Listed weight: 199 lb (90 kg)

Career information
- High school: Superior Central
- College: Minnesota
- NFL draft: 1950: 1st round, 14th overall pick

Career history

Playing
- Philadelphia Eagles (1951–1952); Winnipeg Blue Bombers (1953–1956)

Coaching
- Winnipeg Blue Bombers (1957–1966) Head coach; Minnesota Vikings (1967–1983; 1985) Head coach

Operations
- Minnesota Vikings (1986–2022) Consultant

Awards and highlights
- As a coach: 4× Grey Cup champion (1958, 1959, 1961, 1962); NFL champion (1969); NFL Coach of the Year (1969); CFL Coach of the Year (1965); Minnesota Vikings Ring of Honor; 50 Greatest Vikings; Minnesota Vikings 25th Anniversary Team; Minnesota Vikings 40th Anniversary Team; Winnipeg Blue Bombers Ring of Honour; As a player: 3x CFL West All-Star (1953, 1954, 1956); Second-team All-American (1949); 2× First-team All-Big Nine (1948, 1949)

Career NFL statistics
- Receptions: 56
- Receiving yards: 997
- Receiving touchdowns: 7
- Stats at Pro Football Reference

Head coaching record
- Regular season: NFL: 158–96–5 (.620); CFL: 102–56–2 (.644)
- Postseason: NFL: 10–12 (.455); CFL: 16–8–1 (.660)
- Career: NFL: 168–108–5 (.607); CFL: 118–64–3 (.646)
- Coaching profile at Pro Football Reference
- Pro Football Hall of Fame
- Canadian Football Hall of Fame
- Basketball career

Career information
- College: Minnesota
- NBA draft: 1950: 4th round, 47th overall pick
- Drafted by: Minneapolis Lakers
- Playing career: 1949–1951
- Position: Forward
- Number: 14, 20

Career history
- 1949–1951: Minneapolis Lakers

Career highlights
- NBA champion (1950)
- Stats at NBA.com
- Stats at Basketball Reference

Harry Peter "Bud" Grant Jr. (May 20, 1927 – March 11, 2023) was an American professional football player and coach in the National Football League (NFL) and Canadian Football League (CFL). Grant was head coach of the NFL's Minnesota Vikings for 18 seasons; he was the team's second (1967–1983) and fourth (1985) head coach, leading them to four Super Bowl appearances, 11 division titles, one league championship and three National Football Conference championships. Before coaching the Vikings, he was the head coach of the Winnipeg Blue Bombers for 10 seasons, winning the Grey Cup four times.

Grant attended the University of Minnesota and was a three-sport athlete, in football, basketball, and baseball. After college, he played in the National Basketball Association (NBA) for the Minneapolis Lakers where he won the 1950 NBA Finals. Grant left the NBA to play in the NFL with the Philadelphia Eagles before leaving for the Winnipeg Blue Bombers of the CFL. A statue of Grant stands in front of the Winnipeg Blue Bombers' current stadium, Princess Auto Stadium.

Grant is the most successful coach in Vikings history, and he was the most successful in Blue Bombers history until he was surpassed by Mike O'Shea during the 2024 season. He is the fifth-most winningest coach in professional football history with a combined 286 wins in the NFL and CFL. Grant was elected to the Canadian Football Hall of Fame in 1983 and to the Pro Football Hall of Fame in 1994. He was the first coach to guide teams to both the Grey Cup and the Super Bowl, the only other being Marv Levy.

== Early life ==
Grant was born on May 20, 1927, in Superior, Wisconsin, to Harry Peter Sr. and Bernice Grant. His mother called him "Buddy Boy", which later became "Bud". As a child, Grant was diagnosed with poliomyelitis and a doctor suggested he become active in sports to strengthen his weakened leg muscles over time. He started with baseball, adding basketball and football as he got older. Due to a lack of organized school teams, he arranged football games between neighborhoods and contacted kids from other schools to participate. During weekends, he spent time outdoors alone hunting rabbits. In his late teens and college years, he played organized baseball in Minnesota and Wisconsin.

In 1940, Grant and two friends were duck hunting on Yellow Lake in northern Wisconsin when the Armistice Day Blizzard occurred. Grant survived by first being able to hear a train horn and finding train tracks before sheltering at a gas station while his friends were at a farmer's house.

Grant played football, basketball, and baseball at Superior Central High School.

== Playing career ==
=== University of Minnesota ===
He graduated from high school in 1945 and enlisted in the U.S. Navy during World War II. He was assigned to the Great Lakes Naval Training Station in Illinois and played on the football team coached by Paul Brown. Using an acceptance letter from the University of Wisconsin–Madison to be discharged from the service, Grant decided to attend the University of Minnesota instead. He was a three-sport, nine-letterman athlete in football, basketball, and baseball for the Minnesota Golden Gophers, earning All-Big Ten Conference honors in football twice.

While at the University of Minnesota, Grant was a member of the Phi Delta Theta fraternity.

=== Minneapolis Lakers ===
After leaving the University of Minnesota, Grant was selected in both the NFL and NBA draft. He was selected in the first round (14th overall) of the 1950 NFL draft by the Philadelphia Eagles and fourth round (47th overall) selection of the Minneapolis Lakers in the 1950 NBA draft. He played 35 games during the 1949–50 NBA season and signed with the Lakers for the 1950–51 NBA season. He chose to continue his basketball career with the Lakers because they were local and because he was offered a raise to stay for the season. Grant's close personal friend Sid Hartman was the Lakers' general manager, which may have influenced his decision to remain with the team. He averaged 2.6 points per game in his two seasons as a reserve with the Lakers and was a member of the 1950 championship team. After the death of Arnie Ferrin in 2022, he became the oldest living NBA champion.

=== Philadelphia Eagles ===
After two seasons in the NBA, Grant decided to end his professional basketball career. He contacted the Philadelphia Eagles of the NFL and agreed to play for the team during the 1951 NFL season. In his first season with the Eagles, Grant played as a defensive end and led the team in sacks (an unofficial statistic at the time). He switched to offense as a wide receiver for his second season with the club and ranked second in the NFL for receiving yardage, with 997 yards on 56 catches, including seven touchdowns.

Grant's contract expired at the end of the 1952 NFL season and the Eagles refused to pay him what he thought he was worth. The Winnipeg Blue Bombers of the CFL had been interested in Grant while in college. Grant left for Winnipeg, Manitoba in 1953 and became the first professional player to "play out his option" and leave for another team. He played for the Blue Bombers until 1956 as an offensive end and was named a Western Conference all-star three times. He led the Western Conference in pass receptions for the 1953, 1954, and 1956 seasons and receiving yards for the 1953 and 1956 seasons. He also holds the distinction of having made five interceptions in a playoff game, played on October 28, 1953, which is a record in all of professional football. The Blue Bombers played for the Grey Cup in 1953, but lost to the Hamilton Tiger-Cats in the 41st Grey Cup game.

== Coaching career ==
=== Winnipeg Blue Bombers ===
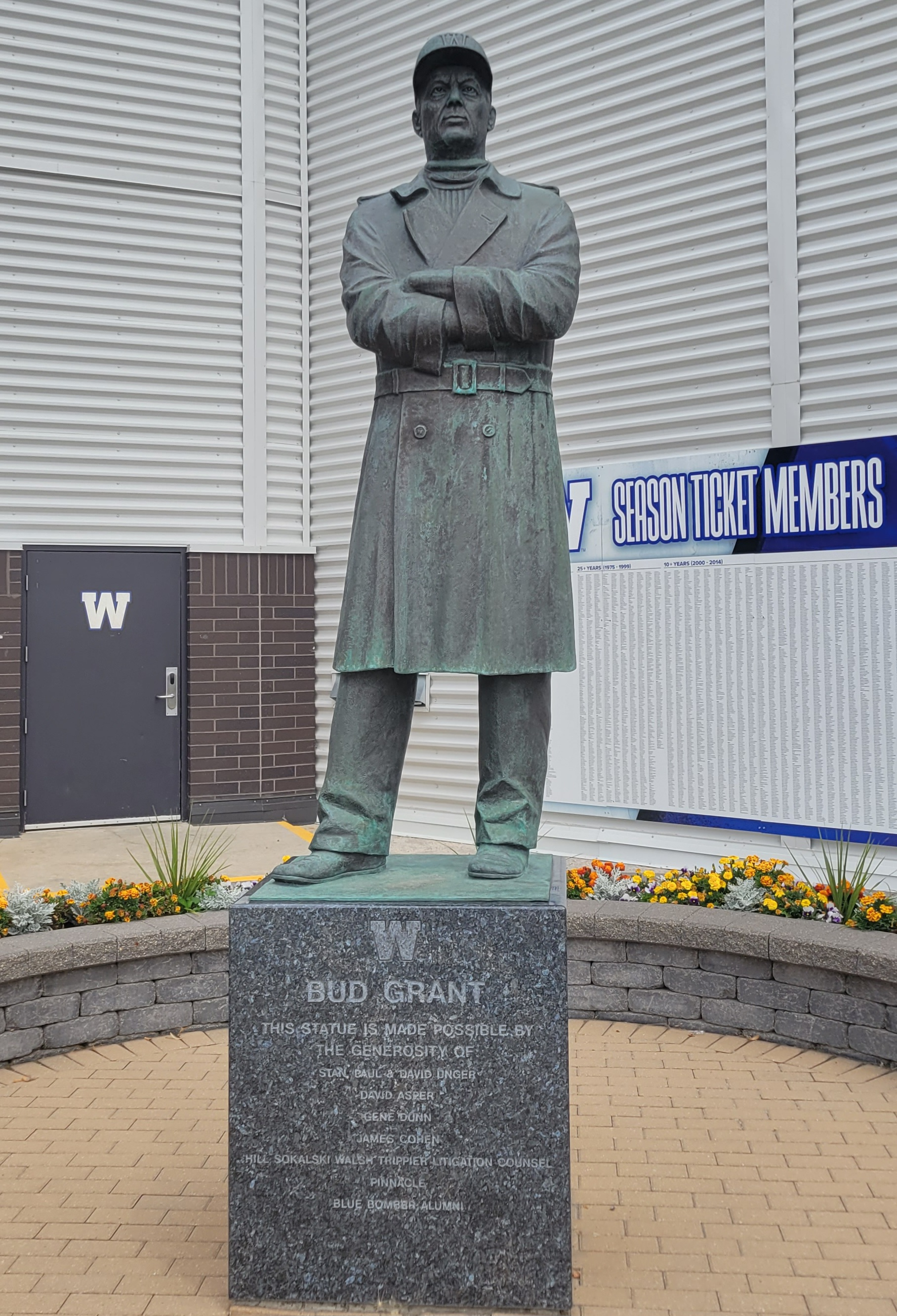
A statue honoring Bud Grant outside Princess Auto Stadium in Winnipeg

Blue Bombers management decided that they needed a new coach prior to the 1957 season. On January 30, 1957, Grant accepted the Blue Bombers head coaching position after impressing management with his ability to make adjustments on offense and defense as a player. Club president J. T. Russell thought that Grant could coach even though nobody else did. Grant remained the head coach of the Blue Bombers until 1966. At age 29 (he was 30 by the time he coached his first game), Grant became the youngest head coach in CFL history.

During his ten seasons as head coach in Winnipeg, he led the team to six Grey Cup appearances winning the championship four times in 1958, 1959, 1961, and 1962. He finished his Blue Bombers coaching career with a regular season record of 102 wins, 56 losses, and two ties and an overall record of 118 wins, 64 losses, and 3 ties. Grant was the CFL Coach of the Year in 1965. Grant took on additional responsibilities as a club manager between 1964 and 1966. Max Winter, the Minnesota Vikings founder, contacted Grant in 1961 and asked him to coach the new NFL expansion team. Grant declined the offer and remained in Winnipeg until 1967 when Winter and General Manager Jim Finks were successful in luring Grant to Minnesota.

=== Minnesota Vikings ===
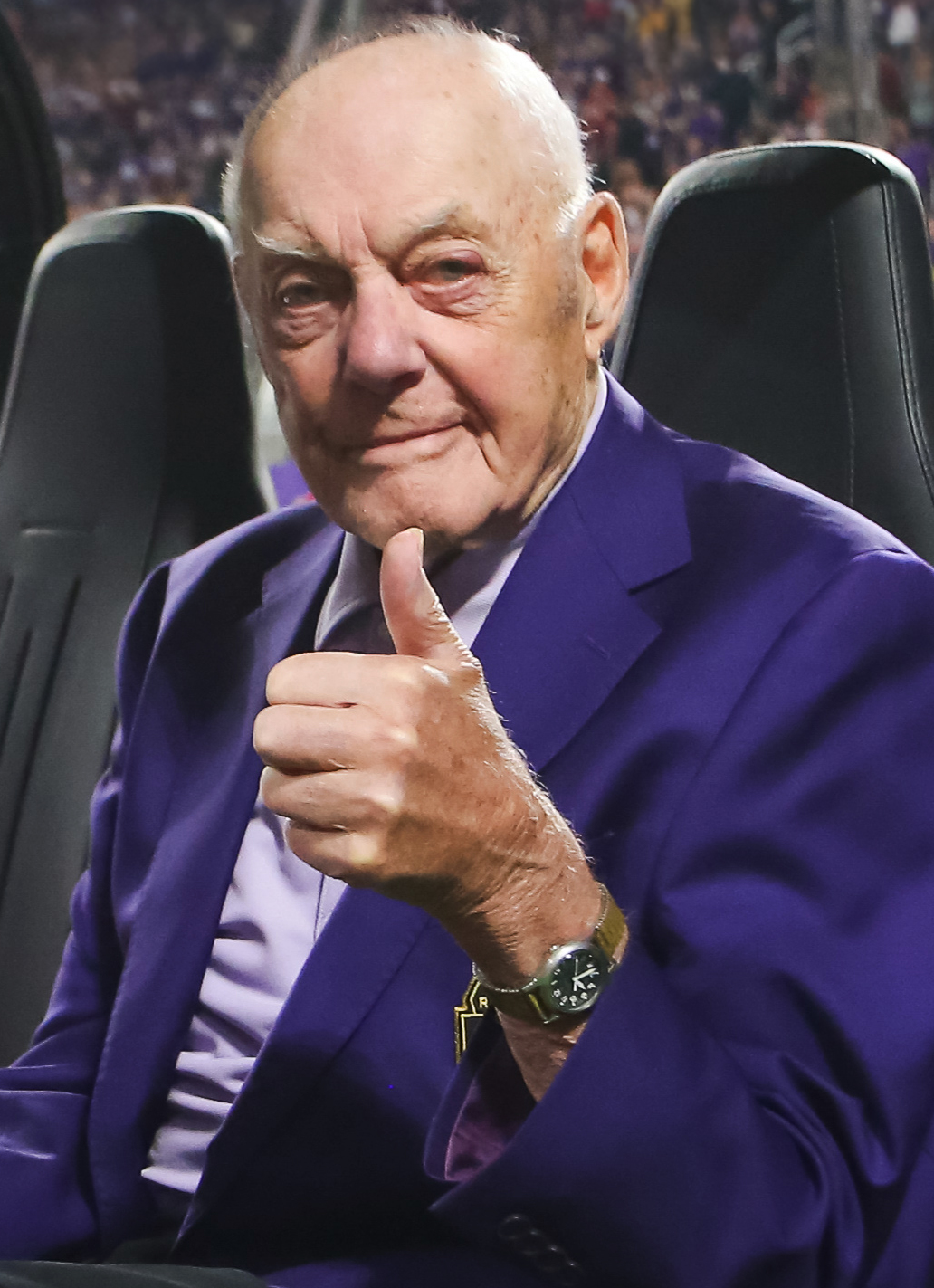
Grant at U.S. Bank Stadium in 2019

The Minnesota Vikings hired Grant as their head coach on March 11, 1967, taking over from their original coach, Norm Van Brocklin.

Over his tenure as Vikings head coach, Grant was known for instilling discipline in his teams and displaying a lack of emotion during games. He believed that football is a game of controlled emotion and teams would not follow the coach's lead if he were to panic or lose his poise during the course of a game. He required his team to stand at attention in a straight line during the entire national anthem played before the game and even had national anthem practice. Grant required outdoor practice during the winter to get players used to the cold weather and did not allow heaters on the sidelines during games. As per the latter practice it goes that Grant posited that with the heaters present on the sidelines the players would gather around the source of the warmth but if the heaters were not present the players would be paying attention to the game.

In his second year, Grant led the team to a divisional championship and his first NFL playoffs appearance. In 1969, he led the team to its first NFL Championship and their first appearance in the Super Bowl. The Vikings lost in Super Bowl IV to the American Football League champion Kansas City Chiefs. Prior to the 1970 season, Minnesota released Joe Kapp. After starting Gary Cuozzo at quarterback in 1970 and 1971, the Vikings re-acquired Fran Tarkenton prior to the 1972 season. During the 1970s, the Vikings appeared in three more Super Bowls (VIII, IX, and XI) under Grant and lost each one, but he was the first coach to lead a team to four Super Bowl appearances. He retired after the 1983 NFL season and was succeeded by Les Steckel, who led the team to a 3–13 record the following season. Steckel was fired as head coach after the 1984 season and Grant returned as coach for the Vikings in 1985. After one season where he returned the club to a 7–9 record, he stepped down again. Grant retired as the eighth most successful coach in NFL history with an overall record of 161 wins, 99 losses, and 5 ties. As of 2021, he also remains the most successful coach in Vikings history. During his tenure with the Vikings, he led the Vikings to four Super Bowl games, 11 division titles, one league championship, and three NFC championships.

Grant was the first coach to lead his teams to both a Grey Cup and a Super Bowl, with the only other one being Marv Levy.

== Career playing statistics ==
=== Basketball ===
Legend
GP	Games played	GS	Games started	MPG	Minutes per game
FG%	Field goal percentage	3P%	3-point field goal percentage	FT%	Free throw percentage
RPG	Rebounds per game	APG	Assists per game	SPG	Steals per game
BPG	Blocks per game	PPG	Points per game	**Bold**	Career high
†	Won an NBA championship

==== College ====
Year	Team	GP	FT%	PPG
1947–48	Minnesota	12		8.2
1948–49	Minnesota	**21**	**.737**	**8.5**
1949–50	Minnesota	1		5.0
Career		34		8.3

==== NBA ====
===== Regular season =====
Year	Team	GP	FG%	FT%	RPG	APG	PPG
1949–50†	Minneapolis	35	**.365**	.412		.5	2.6
1950–51	Minneapolis	**61**	.288	**.627**	1.9	**1.2**	2.6
Career		96	.318	.590	1.9	.9	2.6

===== Playoffs =====
Year	Team	GP	FG%	FT%	RPG	APG	PPG
1950†	Minneapolis	**11**	**.400**	.500		**.6**	**3.9**
1951	Minneapolis	6	.364	**1.000**	.8	.0	1.8
Career		17	.393	.588	.8	.4	3.2

=== Football ===
==== NFL ====
Legend
	Led the league
**Bold**	Career high

===== Regular season =====
Year	Team	Games		Receiving							Fumbles		Punt returns				
Year	Team	GP	GS	Rec	Yds	R/Y	Lng	TD	R/G	Y/G	Fum	FR	Ret	Yds	TD	Lng	Y/Ret
1951	PHI	**12**	11	0	0	–	0	0	0	0	0	**2**	**1**	**9**	0	**9**	**9.0**
1952	PHI	**12**	**12**	**56**	**997**	**17.8**	**84**	**7**	**4.7**	**83.1**	**4**	1	0	0	0	0	0
Career		24	23	56	997	17.8	84	7	4.7	83.1	4	3	1	9	0	9	9.0

== Head coaching record ==
=== NFL ===
Team	Year	Regular season					Postseason			
Team	Year	Won	Lost	Ties	Win %	Finish	Won	Lost	Win %	Result
MIN	1967	3	8	3	.273	4th in NFL Central	–	–	–	–
MIN	1968	8	6	0	.571	1st in NFL Central	0	1	.000	Lost to Baltimore Colts in NFL Western Championship Game
MIN	1969	12	2	0	.857	1st in NFL Central	2	1	.667	Won NFL Championship. Lost to Kansas City Chiefs in Super Bowl IV
MIN	1970	12	2	0	.857	1st in NFC Central	0	1	.000	Lost to San Francisco 49ers in NFC Divisional Game
MIN	1971	11	3	0	.786	1st in NFC Central	0	1	.000	Lost to Dallas Cowboys in NFC Divisional Game
MIN	1972	7	7	0	.500	3rd in NFC Central	–	–	–	–
MIN	1973	12	2	0	.857	1st in NFC Central	2	1	.667	Lost to Miami Dolphins in Super Bowl VIII
MIN	1974	10	4	0	.714	1st in NFC Central	2	1	.667	Lost to Pittsburgh Steelers in Super Bowl IX
MIN	1975	12	2	0	.857	1st in NFC Central	0	1	.000	Lost to Dallas Cowboys in NFC Divisional Game
MIN	1976	11	2	1	.821	1st in NFC Central	2	1	.667	Lost to Oakland Raiders in Super Bowl XI
MIN	1977	9	5	0	.643	1st in NFC Central	1	1	.500	Lost to Dallas Cowboys in NFC Championship Game
MIN	1978	8	7	1	.531	1st in NFC Central	0	1	.000	Lost to Los Angeles Rams in NFC Divisional Game
MIN	1979	7	9	0	.438	3rd in NFC Central	–	–	–	–
MIN	1980	9	7	0	.563	1st in NFC Central	0	1	.000	Lost to Philadelphia Eagles in NFC Divisional Game
MIN	1981	7	9	0	.438	4th in NFC Central	–	–	–	–
MIN	1982*	5	4	0	.556	4th in NFC	1	1	.500	Lost to Washington Redskins in NFC Second Round Game
MIN	1983	8	8	0	.500	4th in NFC Central	–	–	–	–
MIN	1985	7	9	0	.438	3rd in NFC Central	–	–	–	–
NFL total		158	96	5	.622		10	12	.455	

* The 1982 NFL season was shortened to nine games due to a players' strike.

=== CFL ===
Team	Year	Regular season					Postseason			
Team	Year	Won	Lost	Ties	Win %	Finish	Won	Lost	Win %	Result
WPG	1957	12	4	0	.750	2nd in W.I.F.U	2	1	0.667	Lost to Hamilton Tiger-Cats in 45th Grey Cup
WPG	1958	13	3	0	.813	1st in WIFU Conference	2	0	1.000	Won over Hamilton Tiger-Cats in 46th Grey Cup
WPG	1959	12	4	0	.750	1st in West Conference	2	0	1.000	Won over Hamilton Tiger-Cats in 47th Grey Cup
WPG	1960	14	2	0	.875	1st in West Conference	0	1	.000	Lost to Edmonton Eskimos in Conference Finals
WPG	1961	13	3	0	.813	1st in West Conference	2	0	1.000	Won over Hamilton Tiger-Cats in 49th Grey Cup
WPG	1962	11	5	0	.688	1st in West Conference	2	0	1.000	Won over Hamilton Tiger-Cats in 50th Grey Cup
WPG	1963	7	9	0	.438	4th in West Conference	–	–	–	–
WPG	1964	1	14	1	.094	5th in West Conference	–	–	–	–
WPG	1965	11	5	0	.688	2nd in West Conference	2	1	.667	Lost to Hamilton Tiger-Cats in 53rd Grey Cup
WPG	1966	8	7	1	.531	2nd in West Conference	1	1	.500	Lost to Saskatchewan Roughriders in Conference Finals
CFL total		102	56	2	.644		13	4	.765	

== Post-coaching career ==
After retiring, Grant became a less prominent public figure and focused on hunting and fishing as well as supporting environmental reforms. He was a spokesperson against Native American hunting and fishing treaty rights in Minnesota. In 1993, Grant's efforts resulted in a death threat. In 2005, he spoke at a Capitol rally in Minnesota for the conservation of wetlands, wetland wildlife, and water. Grant addressed 5,000 supporters, saying, "In this legislative session, we want to see some action. It's more important than any stadium they could ever build in this state." He spoke in favor of 2008 Minnesota Amendment 1. In 1983, Grant was inducted into the Canadian Football Hall of Fame and in 1994, he would be inducted into the Pro Football Hall of Fame by Sid Hartman, who was by then a senior Minnesota sports columnist.

Until his death, Grant was still listed as a consultant for the Vikings and maintained an office at the team's headquarters at TCO Performance Center in Eagan, Minnesota.

In 2004, Bud Grant would be asked to return to the position of Vikings head football coach by Red McCombs, hypothetically replacing Mike Tice. However, the deal would break down over the salary Grant would receive. As Grant would state afterwards, "I would have come back...for a short time, anyway. It certainly would have been exciting to do at 78 years old."

In 2014, the Winnipeg Blue Bombers unveiled a statue of Coach Grant outside IG Field. In 2016, Grant was inducted into the Blue Bomber ring of honour.

== Personal life and death ==
Bud married Pat (née Patricia Nelson; born March 28, 1927) in 1950, and they had six children (Kathy, Laurie, Harry III "Peter", Mike, Bruce, and Danny). Bruce died July 25, 2018, from brain cancer. Mike started coaching in 1979 at Minnetonka High School, then became the Forest Lake head coach from 1981 to 1986 and 1989 to 1991. In between those stints, Mike served as the Saint John's (Minnesota) offensive coach in 1987 and 1988. Mike has been the football head coach for Eden Prairie High School in Eden Prairie, Minnesota since 1992. Mike Grant has coached Eden Prairie to 11 state championships since he began his tenure at the school. Bud Grant's grandson Ryan Grant was a quarterback and linebacker at Eden Prairie and played at the University of Minnesota (2008–2012) as a linebacker. Bud's granddaughter Jenny is married to former NFL quarterback Gibran Hamdan.

Pat Grant died of Parkinson's disease on March 4, 2009, at age 81.

Bud Grant died at home in Bloomington, Minnesota, on March 11, 2023, at age 95.

== Coaching tree ==
As of 2020, seven of Grant's assistants have become head coaches. One of these (Pete Carroll) has won the Super Bowl. Another (Marc Trestman) has won two CFL Grey Cup Championships.

- Pete Carroll, Las Vegas Raiders (2025-2026), Seattle Seahawks (2010–2023), New England Patriots (1997–1999), New York Jets (1994)
- Marc Trestman, Chicago Bears (2013–2014), Canadian Football League, Montreal Alouettes (2008–2012), Toronto Argonauts (2017–2018)
- Jerry Burns, Minnesota Vikings (1986–1991)
- Buddy Ryan, Philadelphia Eagles (1986–1990); Arizona Cardinals (1994–1995)
- Les Steckel, Minnesota Vikings (1984)
- Neill Armstrong, Chicago Bears (1977–1981)
- Jack Patera, Seattle Seahawks (1976–1982)
- Bob Hollway, St. Louis Cardinals (1971–1972)

== See also ==
- List of National Football League head coach wins leaders
- List of National Football League head coaches with 200 wins
