= Ted Duncan =

Canadian football player

Profile
- Positions: Quarterback, Back, Halfback

Personal information
- Born: c. 1931; Barrie, Ontario
- Listed height: 5 ft 11 in (1.80 m)
- Listed weight: 185 lb (84 kg)

Career history
- 1955–1956: BC Lions
- 1957–1958, 1961: Calgary Stampeders

Ted Duncan (born c. 1931) was a Canadian professional football player who played for the Calgary Stampeders and BC Lions. He played college football at the University of British Columbia.
