= Bronko Nagurski Jr. =

American gridiron football player (1937–2011)

Profile
- Position: Offensive tackle

Personal information
- Born: December 25, 1937; International Falls, Minnesota, U.S.
- Died: March 7, 2011 (aged 73); International Falls, Minnesota, U.S.
- Listed height: 6 ft 1 in (1.85 m)
- Listed weight: 259 lb (117 kg)

Career information
- College: Notre Dame
- NFL draft: 1959: 10th round, 114th overall pick

Career history
- 1959–1966: Hamilton Tiger-Cats

Awards and highlights
- 2× Grey Cup champion (1963, 1965); 2× CFL All-Star (1962, 1965); 3× CFL East All-Star (1962, 1964, 1965)

Bronko Nagurski Jr. (December 25, 1937 – March 7, 2011) was an American offensive tackle in the Canadian Football League (CFL). He was son of the famed National Football League (NFL) player Bronko Nagurski.

== Professional career ==
After playing college football at Notre Dame, Nagurski was drafted by the NFL's San Francisco 49ers in the 1959 NFL draft, in the 10th round, 114th overall. However, he chose to play in Canada. Starting his eight-year career in the 1959 CFL season with the Hamilton Tiger-Cats, Nagurski would be a two-time all-star and played in six Grey Cup games, winning two championships.

== After football ==
Later he worked for 35 years in human resources in the paper industry. In 2006, the 68-year-old Nagurski was diagnosed with non-Hodgkin's lymphoma. He died on March 7, 2011, at the age of 73.
