= Gordon Chiarot =

Canadian football player

Profile
- Position: Guard

Personal information
- Born: c. 1937
- Listed height: 6 ft 1 in (1.85 m)
- Listed weight: 235 lb (107 kg)

Career history
- 1957: Hamilton Tiger-Cats
- 1958: BC Lions

Awards and highlights
- Grey Cup champion (1957)

Gordon Chiarot (born c. 1937) was a Canadian football player who played for the Hamilton Tiger-Cats and BC Lions. He won the Grey Cup with Hamilton in 1957. He previous played football at and attended McMaster University.
