= Gerry Patrick =

Profile
- Positions: Offensive guard, center, defensive end

Personal information
- Listed height: 6 ft 2 in (1.88 m)
- Listed weight: 220 lb (100 kg)

Career information
- College: University of Illinois

Career history
- 1961–1963: Toronto Argonauts

Awards and highlights
- CFL East All-Star (1962) at guard

Gerry Patrick was a Canadian Football League offensive guard, linebacker, and defensive end from 1961 to 1963. He became an east division all-star at guard for the Toronto Argonauts in 1962.

After playing college football at the University of Illinois, Gerry Patrick joined the Toronto Argonauts in 1961. Patrick played offensive guard, linebacker, and defensive end, but shone mostly at guard. He intercepted 1 pass for 0 yards in his career. This was in his second year when he broke his ankle on that play, ending with 11 games played. Also in 1962, Patrick was voted as an eastern conference all-star at guard. Despite this accolade, he played only one game for a bad Argos team that wound up with a 3-11 record the following year and never played another season.
