= Ernie White (Canadian football) =

Profile
- Position: Running back

Personal information
- Born: January 26, 1938; Youngstown Ohio, U.S.
- Listed height: 5 ft 8 in (1.73 m)
- Listed weight: 180 lb (82 kg)

Career information
- College: University of Dayton

Career history
- 1960–1960: Hamilton Tiger Cats
- 1961–1964: Ottawa Rough Riders
- 1965–1965: Montreal Alouettes

Awards and highlights
- CFL East All-Star (1962)

Ernie White was an American professional football running back who played 6 seasons in the Canadian Football League for three teams. He was voted as an eastern conference all-star in 1962.

Ernie White played college football at the University of Dayton and, after playing rugby for the London Lords of the Ontario Rugby Football Union, joined the Hamilton Tiger Cats in 1960, where he had only 3 carries. White blossomed as a member of the Ottawa Rough Riders the following year, rushing for a 9.0 yard average on 30 carries on a backfield that included Dave Thelen and Ron Stewart. White became an eastern conference all-star in 1962, rushing for 804 yards (5.9 yards per carry), along with 758 receiving yards (24.5 yards per catch), 429 yards in kick returns (26.8 yards per return), and 10 touchdowns. Despite his 6.4 yards per rush average and 23.4 yards per catch, he had fewer than half as many carries the following year. He nevertheless led the east in kickoff return yards with 665 and a 35.0 yard per return average. He played only 5 games for Ottawa in 1964 and 5 more in 1965 for the Montreal Alouettes before retiring.
