= Ron Howell (Canadian sportsman) =

Profile
- Positions: Running back, Defensive back, Defenceman, LW

Personal information
- Born: December 4, 1935; Hamilton, Ontario, Canada
- Died: March 16, 1992 (aged 56); Hamilton, Ontario, Canada
- Listed height: 6 ft 0 in (1.83 m)
- Listed weight: 185 lb (84 kg)

Career history
- 1954–1956: New York Rangers (NHL)
- 1954–1962: Hamilton Tiger-Cats
- 1962: BC Lions
- 1964–1965: Toronto Argonauts
- 1966: Montreal Alouettes

Awards and highlights
- Grey Cup champion (1957); CFL's Most Outstanding Canadian Award (1958); Gruen Trophy (1954); 2× CFL East AllStar (1958, 1959)

Other information
Ice hockey career
- Height: 6 ft 0 in (183 cm)
- Weight: 185 lb (84 kg; 13 st 3 lb)
- Position: Defence
- Shot: Left
- Played for: New York Rangers
- Playing career: 1954–1964

Ronald Howell (December 4, 1935 – March 16, 1992) was a Canadian professional football and hockey player. He played in the Canadian Football League from 1954 to 1962, and the National Hockey League from 1954 to 1956.

== Career ==
Howell was a running back for the Hamilton Tiger-Cats of the Canadian Football League from 1954–1962. He won the CFL's Most Outstanding Canadian Award in 1958 and the Gruen Trophy as the outstanding rookie in the CFL East in 1954. He also played four games in the National Hockey League for the New York Rangers.

== Personal life ==
Howell is the brother of Hockey Hall of Famer Harry Howell.

== Career ice hockey statistics ==
=== Regular season and playoffs ===
			Regular season					Playoffs
Season	Team	League	GP	G	A	Pts	PIM	GP	G	A	Pts	PIM
1952–53	Kitchener Greenshirts	OHA	1	0	0	0	0	—	—	—	—	—
1952–53	Guelph Biltmores	OHA	4	2	2	4	8	—	—	—	—	—
1953–54	Guelph Biltmores	OHA	54	20	26	46	48	3	0	0	0	2
1954–55	New York Rangers	NHL	2	0	0	0	0	—	—	—	—	—
1954–55	Guelph Biltmores	OHA	35	18	26	44	22	6	6	5	11	6
1955–56	New York Rangers	NHL	1	0	0	0	0	—	—	—	—	—
1955–56	Guelph Biltmores	OHA	36	21	40	61	24	3	0	0	0	0
1956–57	Kitchener-Waterloo Dutchmen	OHA Sr	30	8	18	26	16	11	2	7	9	8
1956–57	Kitchener-Waterloo Dutchmen	Al-Cup	—	—	—	—	—	7	1	2	3	4
1957–58	Kitchener-Waterloo Dutchmen	OHA Sr	30	19	22	41	16	16	5	3	8	16
1957–58	Kitchener-Waterloo Dutchmen	Al-Cup	—	—	—	—	—	5	0	4	4	2
1958–59	Vancouver Canucks	WHL	37	9	9	18	12	9	2	3	5	4
1960–61	Rochester Americans	AHL	22	4	1	5	2	—	—	—	—	—
1962–63	Kitchener-Waterloo Tigers	OHA Sr	7	6	13	2	—	—	—	—	—
1962–63	Long Island Ducks	EHL	10	3	9	12	6	7	3	1	4	6
1963–64	Guelph Regals	OHA Sr	7	1	3	4	13	—	—	—	—	—
1963–64	Long Island Ducks	EHL	28	7	7	14	15	5	2	2	4	0
NHL totals			4	0	0	0	0	—	—	—	—	—
OHA Sr totals			80	35	49	84	47	27	7	10	17	24
