= Joe Poirier =

Canadian football player (1937–2021)

Profile
- Position: Defensive back

Personal information
- Born: July 30, 1937; Verdun, Quebec, Canada
- Died: December 22, 2021 (aged 84); Aylmer, Gatineau, Quebec, Canada
- Listed height: 6 ft 1 in (1.85 m)
- Listed weight: 190 lb (86 kg)

Career information
- University: McGill

Career history
- 1959–1970: Ottawa Rough Riders

Awards and highlights
- 3× Grey Cup champion (1960, 1968, 1969); CFL All-Star (1966); 5× CFL East All-Star (1960, 1962, 1963, 1964, 1966); 1959 Gruen Trophy (best rookie in East)

John Joseph Poirier (July 30, 1937 – December 22, 2021) was an all-star and Grey Cup champion football player in the CFL for twelve years with the Ottawa Rough Riders.

He played as a defensive back for the Riders and was a part of three Grey Cup winning teams and was a 5-time Eastern all-star. He never missed a game in the 12 years he played.
