= Ken Ploen =

American gridiron football player (1935–2024)

No. 11, 89
- Position: Quarterback

Personal information
- Born: June 3, 1935; Lost Nation, Iowa, U.S.
- Died: February 13, 2024 (aged 88); Winnipeg, Manitoba, Canada
- Listed height: 6 ft 3 in (1.91 m)
- Listed weight: 200 lb (91 kg)

Career information
- High school: Clinton (Clinton, Iowa)
- College: Iowa
- NFL draft: 1957: 19th round, 222nd overall pick

Career history
- 1957–1967: Winnipeg Blue Bombers

Awards and highlights
- 4× Grey Cup champion (1958, 1959, 1961, 1962); Grey Cup MVP (1961); CFL All-Star (1965); 3× CFL West All-Star (1957, 1959, 1965); Second-team All-American (1956); Chicago Tribune Silver Football (1956); First-team All-Big Ten (1956)
- Canadian Football Hall of Fame (Class of 1975)

Kenneth Ploen OM (June 3, 1935 – February 13, 2024) was an American professional football player who was a star quarterback and safety for the Winnipeg Blue Bombers of the Canadian Football League (CFL). The Lost Nation, Iowa native played the same positions in college football for the Iowa Hawkeyes approximately 60 minutes from his birthplace.

In September 2009, Ploen was recognized in a vote of the fans and by the Canadian Football Hall of Fame as the Most Outstanding CFL Player of the 1960s. He and Warren Moon are the only players to be selected to the Rose Bowl Hall of Fame and Canadian Football Hall of Fame and be part of multiple Grey Cup championships.

== College football ==
On the heels of a seventh-place finish in the Big Ten Conference, the University of Iowa squad suddenly came of age in the 1956 season. The major step forward coincided with the emergence of Ploen, whose uncanny escapability, adroit ball-handling and senior leadership fueled the Wing-T offense that soon became the scourge of the Midwest. The Hawkeyes rolled to a 9-1 record, captured their first conference title in 35 years and made their first bowl appearance in school history. Ploen was named an All-American and the Big Ten Player of the Year and finished ninth in the Heisman Trophy vote.

The exclamation point was a 35-19 dismantling of the Oregon State Beavers in the 1957 Rose Bowl Game in Pasadena, Calif. Ploen set the tone on a scintillating 49-yard touchdown run less than five minutes into the contest, completed 9-of-10 passes for another TD, played safety on defense and saw action on the kickoff and extra-point teams. Late in the first period, he sustained a knee injury on defense and was carried off the field, only to return for the second half and be chosen the Rose Bowl Most Valuable Player in his final college game.

== Canadian Football League ==
Ploen was one of several Iowa players who had been recruited heavily by Bud Grant, the former Winnipeg Blue Bombers offensive end who would be hired as their head coach prior to the 1957 campaign. So while Ploen was selected by the far more visible and established Cleveland Browns in the 19th round of the 1957 NFL draft, it was no surprise that he signed with the Canadian Football League club on June 10, 1957 instead. Whereas the Browns believed his future to be at defensive back, Ploen was assured by the Blue Bombers that he would compete at the quarterback position.

The career decision couldn't have turned out much better for Ploen, a three-time CFL divisional All-Star who led the Blue Bombers to six Grey Cup appearances in a span of nine years, winning four (1958, 1959, 1961, 1962) and losing two (1957, 1965).

In the 49th Grey Cup game (1961), Ploen scored one of the most memorable touchdowns in Canadian football history. In overtime, his team locked in a tense 14-14 battle with the Hamilton Tiger-Cats, the quarterback eluded several defenders on an eighteen-yard run to the endzone (video below). The play proved to be the decisive touchdown in a 21-14 victory in which he was chosen Grey Cup Most Valuable Player.

Ploen and the Blue Bombers rode the wave of their 1961 success into the next season, when the veteran turned in the most dominant performance of his career. The veteran set career highs in touchdown passes (17), pass completion percentage (.659) and passer rating (118.2) and led his team past Hamilton 28-27 in a Grey Cup rematch of the previous season.

In a career that spanned 156 games, Ploen completed 56.6 percent of 1,916 passes for 16,470 yards and 119 touchdowns. He gained 3,001 yards on 588 attempts (5.1 yards per carry) and scored 13 TDs on the ground. On defense, he intercepted 17 passes, which he returned for 216 yards.

Ploen was inducted into the Canadian Football Hall of Fame in 1975, the Manitoba Sports Hall of Fame and Museum in 1987, the Rose Bowl Hall of Fame in 1997, and the Iowa Sports Hall of Fame in 2002. In 2005, Ploen was named one of the Blue Bombers 20 All-Time Greats.

== Life after football ==
After Ploen retired from football, he and his wife Janet made Winnipeg their home. He worked as a sales representative and local radio colour commentator for Blue Bombers games.

In 2007, he was awarded the Order of Manitoba.

In June 2011, the CFL announced the west entry service road off Chancellor Matheson Road next to the new Winnipeg Blue Bombers stadium will be named Ken Ploen Way, to honour the former Blue Bombers quarterback and Canadian Football Hall of Famer. Ploen was also honoured at half-time, during the Blue Bombers’ first 2011 home preseason game, where the street sign was unveiled.

In 2012 in honour of the 100th Grey Cup, Canada Post used his image on a series of commemorative postage stamps. The image was also used on presentation posters and other materials to promote the Grey Cup game and other celebrations associated with the centennial.

Ploen died in Winnipeg on February 13, 2024, at the age of 88. He suffered from dementia in his later years.
