= Garner Ekstran =

American football player (1939–2026)

No. 75
- Positions: Defensive end, Linebacker

Personal information
- Born: June 10, 1939; Bellingham, Washington, U.S.
- Died: April 4, 2026 (aged 86); Sedro-Woolley, Washington, U.S.
- Listed height: 6 ft 0 in (1.83 m)
- Listed weight: 225 lb (102 kg)

Career information
- College: Washington State

Career history
- 1961–1967: Saskatchewan Roughriders
- 1968: BC Lions

Awards and highlights
- Grey Cup champion (1966); 3× CFL All-Star (1962, 1963, 1967); 4× CFL West All-Star (1962, 1963, 1966, 1967)

Nelson Garner Ekstran (June 10, 1939 – April 4, 2026) was an American professional football player who was a defensive end and linebacker in the Canadian Football League (CFL) for seven seasons with the Saskatchewan Roughriders and one more with the BC Lions. He played college football for the Washington State Cougars.

== Early life ==
Ekstran was born in Bellingham, Washington, on June 10, 1939. He played college football at Washington State University and received a Bachelor of Science in Agriculture there in 1965.

== Saskatchewan Roughriders ==
Ekstran played defense for the Saskatchewan Roughriders from 1961 to 1967. He was a CFL all-star in 1962, 1963, and 1967, at defensive end for the first two and also at outside linebacker. Ekstran's solid play on defense helped the Roughriders win the Grey Cup in 1966 against the Ottawa Rough Riders.

== BC Lions ==
Ekstran finished his playing career with the Lions, spending one more year before retiring from professional football.

== Death ==
Ekstran died in Sedro-Woolley, Washington, on April 4, 2026, at the age of 86.
