= Neil Habig =

American gridiron football player (1936–1992)

Profile
- Positions: Center, Linebacker

Personal information
- Born: September 6, 1936; West Lafayette, Indiana, U.S.
- Died: November 24, 1992 (aged 56); Lexington, KY

Career information
- College: Purdue
- NFL draft: 1958: 27th round

Career history
- 1958–1964: Saskatchewan Roughriders

Awards and highlights
- CFL All-Star (1962); 6× CFL West All-Star (1959–1964); Second-team All-Big Ten (1957); Roughrider’s Hall of Fame

′ Neil Habig (September 6, 1936 - November 24, 1992) was an offensive lineman and linebacker for the Saskatchewan Roughriders in the Canadian Football League (CFL) from 1958 to 1964 and was a dominant player at his position of center.

== CFL ==
As a member of the Saskatchewan Roughriders, Neil Habig played center and linebacker. In 7 years (1958–1964), Habig was a CFL All-Star center once (1962, the first year this honor was awarded) and a Western conference all-star 6 times (1959–1964). As a linebacker, he was particularly adept at covering the pass, as indicated by his 10 career interceptions, including 6 in a single year (1963). Despite this prowess, his team reached the Western finals only once, in 1963, and lost to the BC Lions, so that he never played in a Grey cup game. He was replaced in 1965 by Ted Urness, a CFL All-Star center himself for the next 6 years.
