= CFL's Most Outstanding Canadian Award =

Sporting award

The Most Outstanding Canadian Award is annually awarded to the best Canadian player in the Canadian Football League. The two nominees for the award are the Lew Hayman Trophy winner from the East Division, and the Dr. Beattie Martin Trophy winner from the West Division. The winner of the award is chosen by the Football Reporters of Canada since 1954. Players born outside Canada may win the award if they become citizens and attain National status.

== Player achievements ==
The most wins by a player is four, for both Russ Jackson (completed in 1969) and Tony Gabriel (completed in 1978).

The first two-time winner, and also the first to win the award in two consecutive seasons, is Normie Kwong, in 1955 and 1956. The first three-time winner is Jackson, achieved as of 1966, while Gabriel is the only player to win three consecutive awards, from 1976 through 1978.

When a Canadian player is voted the recipient of the CFL's overall Most Outstanding Player Award, they are, of course, the recipient of that same season's Most Outstanding Canadian Award. Only five players have achieved this recognition: Jackson (1963, 1966, 1969), Gabriel (1978), Jon Cornish (2013), Brady Oliveira (2024) and Nathan Rourke (2025)

== CFL's Most Outstanding Canadian Award winners ==
Year	Player	Position	Club
1954	Gerry James	RB	Winnipeg Blue Bombers
1955	Normie Kwong	RB	Edmonton Eskimos
1956	Normie Kwong (2)	RB	Edmonton Eskimos
1957	Gerry James (2)	RB	Winnipeg Blue Bombers
1958	Ron Howell	FW	Hamilton Tiger-Cats
1959	Russ Jackson	QB	Ottawa Rough Riders
1960	Ron Stewart	RB	Ottawa Rough Riders
1961	Tony Pajaczkowski	OG	Calgary Stampeders
1962	Harvey Wylie	DB	Calgary Stampeders
1963	Russ Jackson (2)	QB	Ottawa Rough Riders
1964	Tommy Grant	F	Hamilton Tiger-Cats
1965	Zeno Karcz	LB	Hamilton Tiger-Cats
1966	Russ Jackson (3)	QB	Ottawa Rough Riders
1967	Terry Evanshen	WR	Calgary Stampeders
1968	Ken Nielsen	F	Winnipeg Blue Bombers
1969	Russ Jackson (4)	QB	Ottawa Rough Riders
1970	Jim Young	WR	BC Lions
1971	Terry Evanshen (2)	WR	Montreal Alouettes
1972	Jim Young (2)	WR	BC Lions
1973	Gerry Organ	K	Ottawa Rough Riders
1974	Tony Gabriel	TE	Hamilton Tiger-Cats
1975	Jim Foley	WR	Ottawa Rough Riders
1976	Tony Gabriel (2)	TE	Ottawa Rough Riders
1977	Tony Gabriel (3)	TE	Ottawa Rough Riders
1978	Tony Gabriel (4)	TE	Ottawa Rough Riders
1979	Dave Fennell	DT	Edmonton Eskimos
1980	Gerry Dattilio	QB	Montreal Alouettes
1981	Joe Poplawski	SB	Winnipeg Blue Bombers
1982	Rocky DiPietro	SB	Hamilton Tiger-Cats
1983	Paul Bennett	DB	Winnipeg Blue Bombers
1984	Nick Arakgi	SB	Montreal Concordes
1985	Paul Bennett (2)	DB	Hamilton Tiger-Cats
1986	Joe Poplawski (2)	SB	Winnipeg Blue Bombers
1987	Scott Flagel	S	Winnipeg Blue Bombers
1988	Ray Elgaard	SB	Saskatchewan Roughriders
1989	Rocky DiPietro (2)	SB	Hamilton Tiger-Cats
1990	Ray Elgaard (2)	SB	Saskatchewan Roughriders
1991	Blake Marshall	FB	Edmonton Eskimos
1992	Ray Elgaard (3)	SB	Saskatchewan Roughriders
1993	Dave Sapunjis	SB	Calgary Stampeders
1994	Gerald Wilcox	SB	Winnipeg Blue Bombers
1995	Dave Sapunjis (2)	SB	Calgary Stampeders
1996	Leroy Blugh	DE	Edmonton Eskimos
1997	Sean Millington	FB	BC Lions
1998	Mike Morreale	SB	Hamilton Tiger-Cats
1999	Mike O'Shea	LB	Toronto Argonauts
2000	Sean Millington (2)	RB	BC Lions
2001	Doug Brown	DT	Winnipeg Blue Bombers
2002	Ben Cahoon	WR	Montreal Alouettes
2003	Ben Cahoon (2)	SB	Montreal Alouettes
2004	Jason Clermont	SB	BC Lions
2005	Brent Johnson	DE	BC Lions
2006	Brent Johnson (2)	DE	BC Lions
2007	Jason Clermont (2)	SB	BC Lions
2008	Kamau Peterson	WR	Edmonton Eskimos
2009	Ricky Foley	DE	BC Lions
2010	Andy Fantuz	SB	Saskatchewan Roughriders
2011	Jerome Messam	RB	Edmonton Eskimos
2012	Jon Cornish	RB	Calgary Stampeders
2013	Jon Cornish (2)	RB	Calgary Stampeders
2014	Jon Cornish (3)	RB	Calgary Stampeders
2015	Brad Sinopoli	WR	Ottawa Redblacks
2016	Jerome Messam (2)	RB	Calgary Stampeders
2017	Andrew Harris	RB	Winnipeg Blue Bombers
2018	Brad Sinopoli (2)	WR	Ottawa Redblacks
2019	Henoc Muamba	LB	Montreal Alouettes
2020	Season cancelled due to COVID-19 pandemic		
2021	Bo Lokombo	LB	BC Lions
2022	Nathan Rourke	QB	BC Lions
2023	Brady Oliveira	RB	Winnipeg Blue Bombers
2024	Brady Oliveira (2)	RB	Winnipeg Blue Bombers
2025	Nathan Rourke (2)	QB	BC Lions

== Team achievements ==
Teams represented by Most Outstanding Canadian Award winners through the years.

Club	# of winners	Most recent
Ottawa Redblacks/Renegades/Rough Riders (Note: As defined in the 2023 CFL Guide & Record Book, for historical record purposes, the Ottawa Football Clubs are considered to be a single entity since 1876 with two periods of inactivity (1997–2001 and 2006–2013).)	12	2018
BC Lions	12	2025
Winnipeg Blue Bombers	11	2023
Calgary Stampeders	9	2016
Hamilton Tiger-Cats	8	1998
Edmonton Elks/Eskimos (Note: Edmonton Eskimos changed their name to Edmonton Elks as of the 2021 CFL season.)	7	2011
Montreal Alouettes/Concordes (Note: Montreal Alouettes folded and were replaced by the Montreal Concordes during a four season (1982–1985), but were renamed to Alouettes in 1986.)	6	2019
Saskatchewan Roughriders	4	2010
Toronto Argonauts	1	1999
Total for nine clubs	67	

== See also ==
- Dr. Beattie Martin Trophy
- Lew Hayman Trophy
