= Charlie Shepard =

American gridiron football player (1933–2009)

No. 35, 91, 21
- Positions: Halfback, Running back, Defensive back

Personal information
- Born: July 11, 1933); Dallas, Texas, U.S.
- Died: June 23, 2009 (aged 75); Plano, Texas, U.S.
- Listed height: 6 ft 2 in (1.88 m)
- Listed weight: 215 lb (98 kg)

Career information
- High school: Dallas
- College: North Texas (1951–1955)
- NFL draft: 1955: 18th round, 208th overall pick

Career history
- Pittsburgh Steelers (1956); Winnipeg Blue Bombers (1957–1962)

Awards and highlights
- 4× Grey Cup champion (1958, 1959, 1960, 1961); Grey Cup MVP (1959); CFL West All-Star (1959)

Career NFL statistics
- Rushing yards: 91
- Rushing average: 3
- Receptions: 1
- Receiving yards: 31
- Stats at Pro Football Reference

Charles LaFayette Shepard Jr. (July 11, 1933 – June 23, 2009) was an American all-star and Grey Cup champion running back in the Canadian Football League (CFL) with the Winnipeg Blue Bombers from 1957 to 1962.

A graduate of North Texas State University, Shepard played with the Pittsburgh Steelers in 1956, rushing for 91 yards in 12 games. He next joined the Blue Bombers in 1957 for an all-star 6-year stay. He would play in the Grey Cup championship game 5 of those years, winning 4 times. His best season was 1959, when he rushed for 1076 yards, was an all-star and was Grey Cup Most Valuable Player. He rushed for 3768 yards with the Bombers and was an excellent punter, never averaging less than 43.1 yards per punt in a season.

He has since been inducted into the Winnipeg Football Club Hall of Fame, in 1992, and the North Texas State University Athletic Hall of Fame in 2005. Shepard died on July 23, 2009, at the age of 76.
