= Harvey Wylie =

Canadian gridiron football player (1933–2019)

No. 14
- Position: Defensive back

Personal information
- Born: April 6, 1933; Calgary, Alberta, Canada
- Died: September 17, 2019 (aged 86); Calgary, Alberta, Canada
- Listed height: 5 ft 10 in (1.78 m)
- Listed weight: 180 lb (82 kg)

Career information
- College: Montana State

Career history
- 1956–1964: Calgary Stampeders

Awards and highlights
- 2× CFL All-Star (1962, 1963); 5× CFL West All-Star (1959, 1960, 1961, 1962, 1963); CFL's Most Outstanding Canadian Award (1962)
- Canadian Football Hall of Fame (Class of 1980)

Harvey Douglas Wylie (April 6, 1933 – September 17, 2019) was a defensive back who played nine seasons in the Canadian Football League for the Calgary Stampeders (ending his career with them in 1964). For five consecutive seasons, he was an All-Western All-Star and twice he was an All-Canadian All-Star after playing football at Montana State university.

Wylie was also a punt returner, returning 257 punts for a 6.1 yard per punt average, and especially a prolific kick returner, returning 151 kickoffs for a 28.4 yard per kick average, scoring touchdowns of 105, 110, 104, and 102 yards from 1959 to 1962

He excelled in several sports: he played Junior "A" Hockey in Calgary and had a tryout with the Chicago White Sox. Wylie was the winner of the CFL's Most Outstanding Canadian Award in 1962. He was inducted into the Canadian Football Hall of Fame in 1980 and the Alberta Sports Hall of Fame and Museum in 1980.

Wylie later went into business and served as President of Beaufort-Delta Oil Project Limited. He died after a heart attack on September 17, 2019.
