= Jim Rountree =

American gridiron football player (1936–2013)

No. 20
- Positions: Defensive back, Wide receiver

Personal information
- Born: April 24, 1936; Miami, Florida, U.S.
- Died: October 1, 2013 (aged 77); Tamarac, Florida, U.S.
- Listed height: 5 ft 10 in (1.78 m)
- Listed weight: 187 lb (85 kg)

Career information
- College: Florida
- NFL draft: 1958: 25th round, 298th overall pick

Career history

Playing
- 1958–1967: Toronto Argonauts

Coaching
- 1968–1972, 1977–1978: Toronto Argonauts (Asst. coach)
- 1974–1975: Memphis Southmen (WFL) (Asst. coach)

Awards and highlights
- CFL All-Star (1962); 7× CFL East All-Star (1959–1964, 1967); First-team All-SEC (1957); University of Florida Athletic Hall of Fame

James W. Rountree (April 24, 1936 – October 1, 2013) was an American college and professional football player who was a defensive back in the Canadian Football League (CFL) for ten years during the 1950s and 1960s. Rountree played college football for the University of Florida, and thereafter, he played professionally for the Toronto Argonauts of the CFL.

== College career ==
Rountree attended the University of Florida in Gainesville, Florida, where he played for coach Bob Woodruff's Florida Gators football team from 1955 to 1957. Memorably, Rountree had an 85-yard kickoff return for a touchdown, following a key block from Don Chandler, in the Gators' 19–13 win over the Georgia Bulldogs in 1955. He was a first-team All-Southeastern Conference (SEC) selection in 1957, and was the recipient of the Gators' Fergie Ferguson Award, recognizing the "senior football player who displays outstanding leadership, character and courage." Woodruff ranked Rountree as one of the Gators' two best defensive backs and one of their two best running backs of the 1950s.

Rountree was inducted as a "Gator Great" member of the University of Florida Athletic Hall of Fame in 1971.

== Professional career ==
Rountree was selected in the 25th round by the Baltimore Colts in the 1958 NFL draft, but chose instead to play in the CFL. He played defensive back and wide receiver for the Toronto Argonauts from 1958 to 1967, and was a CFL All-Star in 1962. In his rookie season, he played defensive back and halfback on offense, and ran for 200 yards on twenty-six carries. During his ten-season CFL career, Rountree compiled forty-one interceptions, 464 interception return yards, and one interception return touchdown. Later, he was an assistant coach for the Argonauts and the Memphis Southmen of the World Football League (WFL).

At the time of his death in 2013, Rountree still held the Argonauts team records for longest pass reception (108 yards vs. Saskatchewan in 1961), and most interceptions (10) in a single season (1960). He was named an All-Time Argo in 2004, and was named starting cornerback on the All-Time Argos team selected by a committee of alumni, fans and media in 2007.

== Life after football ==
After retiring from football, Rountree built a successful insurance agency in South Florida. He died of cancer on October 1, 2013, in Tamarac, Florida where he lived; he was 77 years old. He was survived by his wife Nan and their two children and three grandchildren.

== See also ==
- Florida Gators football, 1950–59
- List of University of Florida alumni
- List of University of Florida Athletic Hall of Fame members
