= Ed Nickla =

American gridiron football player (1933–2021)

No. 72, 61
- Position: Tackle

Personal information
- Born: August 11, 1933; New York, New York, U.S.
- Died: November 2, 2021 (aged 88); New York, U.S.
- Listed height: 6 ft 3 in (1.91 m)
- Listed weight: 240 lb (109 kg)

Career information
- High school: Mepham (Bellmore, New York)
- College: Tennessee (1950–1952); Maryland (1958)
- NFL draft: 1955: 14th round, 167th overall pick

Career history
- Chicago Bears (1959); Montreal Alouettes (1961–1964); Toronto Argonauts (1964)

Awards and highlights
- 2× CFL East All-Star (1962, 1963); National champion (1951)

Career NFL statistics
- Games played: 12
- Games started: 1
- Stats at Pro Football Reference

Ed Nickla (August 11, 1933 - November 2, 2021) was a Canadian Football League (CFL) player as a linebacker and defensive tackle. He became a 2-time east division All-Star for the Montreal Alouettes in 1962 and 1963.

== Football career ==
After playing football at the University of Tennessee in 1951 and 1952, the US Air Force from 1953 to 1956 at Bolling Air Force Base in Washington D.C., and the University of Maryland in 1958, Ed Nickla joined the Chicago Bears in 1959, though drafted by them in the 14th round back in 1955. Nickla played only one season with Chicago in 1959.

After sitting out the entire 1960 season, Nickla joined the Montreal Alouettes in 1961 as an inside linebacker, a defensive tackle, and a middle guard.

== Recognition ==
Nickla was voted as an East All-Star in 1962 at inside linebacker and in 1963 at defensive tackle. In 1962, he intercepted four passes. However, he was released by the Alouettes after playing only two games in 1964 for being too slow. Though picked up by the Toronto Argonauts for eight more games that same year, he never played another season.
