= Eagle Day =

American gridiron football player (1932–2008)

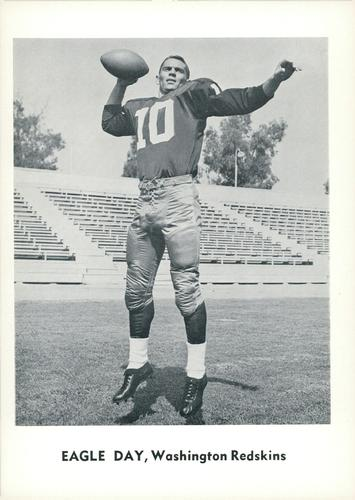
- Day in 1961

No. 83, 10, 19, 12
- Positions: Quarterback, Punter

Personal information
- Born: October 2, 1932; Columbia, Mississippi, U.S.
- Died: February 22, 2008 (aged 75); Nashville, Tennessee, U.S.
- Listed height: 6 ft 0 in (1.83 m)
- Listed weight: 183 lb (83 kg)

Career information
- High school: Columbia
- College: Ole Miss (1952–1955)
- NFL draft: 1956: 17th round, 203rd overall pick

Career history
- Winnipeg Blue Bombers (1956); Washington Redskins (1959–1960); Calgary Stampeders (1961–1966); Toronto Argonauts (1966); Toronto Rifles (1967); Charleston Rockets (1967)

Awards and highlights
- CFL All-Star (1962); CFL West All-Star (1962); Jeff Nicklin Memorial Trophy (1962); 2× First-team All-SEC (1954, 1955); Cotton Bowl Classic MVP (1956); Mississippi Sports Hall of Fame (1981); Ole Miss Athletics Hall of Fame (1988); Cotton Bowl Classic Hall of Fame (2003)

Career NFL statistics
- Passing attempts: 32
- Passing completions: 15
- Completion percentage: 46.9%
- TD–INT: 0–2
- Passing yards: 194
- Passer rating: 40.4
- Punting yards: 2,476
- Punting Average: 42
- Longest Punt: 56
- Stats at Pro Football Reference

Herman Sidney "Eagle" Day (October 2, 1932 – February 22, 2008) was an American punter in the National Football League (NFL) for the Washington Redskins and quarterback in the Canadian Football League (CFL) with the Winnipeg Blue Bombers, Calgary Stampeders and the Toronto Argonauts. He played college football and baseball at the University of Mississippi.

== College career ==
Day was a two-time All-Southeastern Conference quarterback for the University of Mississippi (Ole Miss) Rebels, leading Ole Miss to SEC titles in 1954 and 1955 with a combination of running and passing skills.

Day led Ole Miss to a 26–5–1 record in three seasons while playing for coach Johnny Vaught. He was the MVP of the 1956 Cotton Bowl Classic after leading Ole Miss to a 14–13 upset victory over Texas Christian in the Rebels first major bowl game. After a late-game 25-yard scramble during the 1956 Cotton Bowl Classic game against Texas Christian University, he was given the nickname "The Mississippi Gambler". Day completed 111 of 233 passes for 2,022 yards and 14 touchdowns during his Ole Miss career. Not counting bowl statistics, he had 2,428 yards of total offense and was responsible for 21 touchdowns. His first pass in college (vs. Chattanooga) in 1953 was a 63-yard touchdown.

As a pitcher, Day was with the Rebels baseball team in 1956 when it went to the College World Series.

== Professional career ==
Day played ten years in the Canadian Football League with the Winnipeg Blue Bombers, Calgary Stampeders and Toronto Argonauts and two years in the NFL with the Washington Redskins. His time spent in the CFL was as a quarterback. His two years spent in the NFL with the Redskins was as a punter.

Although Day was drafted by the Washington Redskins in the 17th round of the 1956 NFL draft, he did not join the Redskins until the 1959 and 1960 seasons, instead joining the Winnipeg Blue Bombers for three years first.

In 1961, Day left the NFL for the CFL, joining the Calgary Stampeders, with which team he remained through the 1965 season. In 1962, he was an all-star and won the Jeff Nicklin Memorial Trophy. When he left the Stampeders, he joined the Toronto Argonauts (the first of two Ole Miss stars to play quarterback for Toronto, the other being Kent Austin in 1995).

At the time of his death, Day's 226 playoff completions placed him fifth all-time, while his 3,132 playoff passing yards had him sixth for all-time.
