= 1959 CFL season =

Canadian Football League season

- Duration: June – October, 1959
- East champions: Hamilton Tiger-Cats
- West champions: Winnipeg Blue Bombers

47th Grey Cup
- Date: November 28, 1959
- Venue: Exhibition Stadium, Toronto
- Champions: Winnipeg Blue Bombers

CFL seasons
- 1958 1960

Canadian Football League team locations: WIFU, IRFU

The 1959 CFL season was the sixth season in modern-day Canadian football, although officially it was the second season of the Canadian Football League. The Winnipeg Blue Bombers played the Hamilton Tiger-Cats for the third straight time in the Grey Cup final. The Blue Bombers won the rubber match in a defensive showdown.

== Regular season ==
=== Final regular season standings ===
Note: GP = Games Played, W = Wins, L = Losses, T = Ties, PF = Points For, PA = Points Against, Pts = Points

Western Interprovincial Football Union
Team	GP	W	L	T	PF	PA	Pts
**Winnipeg Blue Bombers**	16	12	4	0	418	272	24
**Edmonton Eskimos**	16	10	6	0	370	221	20
**BC Lions**	16	9	7	0	306	301	18
Calgary Stampeders	16	8	8	0	356	301	16
Saskatchewan Roughriders	16	1	15	0	212	567	2

Interprovincial Rugby Football Union
Team	GP	W	L	T	PF	PA	Pts
**Hamilton Tiger-Cats**	14	10	4	0	298	162	20
**Ottawa Rough Riders**	14	8	6	0	275	217	16
**Montreal Alouettes**	14	6	8	0	193	305	12
Toronto Argonauts	14	4	10	0	192	274	8

- Bold text means that they have clinched the playoffs.
- Winnipeg and Hamilton both have first round byes.

== Grey Cup playoffs ==
Note: All dates in 1959

=== Semi-finals ===
Western Semi-Finals
Edmonton Eskimos vs BC Lions
Game	Date	Away	Home
1	October 31	**Edmonton Eskimos 20**	BC Lions 8
2	November 4	BC Lions 7	**Edmonton Eskimos 41**
Edmonton won the total-point series 61–15

Eastern Semi-Finals
Montreal Alouettes @ Ottawa Rough Riders
Date	Away	Home
November 7	Montreal Alouettes 0	**Ottawa Rough Riders 43**

=== Finals ===
Western Finals
Winnipeg Blue Bombers vs Edmonton Eskimos
Game	Date	Away	Home
1	November 11	**Winnipeg Blue Bombers 19**	Edmonton Eskimos 11
2	November 14	Edmonton Eskimos 8	**Winnipeg Blue Bombers 16**
Winnipeg wins the best of three series 2–0

Eastern Finals
Hamilton Tiger-Cats vs Ottawa Rough Riders
Game	Date	Away	Home
1	November 14	Hamilton Tiger-Cats 5	**Ottawa Rough Riders 17**
2	November 21	Ottawa Rough Riders 7	**Hamilton Tiger-Cats 21**
Hamilton won the total-point series by 26–24

== Playoff bracket ==
Semifinals
East
**E2**	**Ottawa Rough Riders**	**43**
E3	Montreal Alouettes	0
West
**W2**	**Edmonton Eskimos**	**61** (20+41)
W3	BC Lions	15 (8+7)

Finals
**E1**	**Hamilton Tiger-Cats**	**26** (5+21)
E2	Ottawa Rough Riders	24 (17+7)
**W1**	**Winnipeg Blue Bombers**	**2** (19,16)
W2	Edmonton Eskimos	0 (11,8)

47th Grey Cup
E1	Hamilton Tiger-Cats	7
**W1**	**Winnipeg Blue Bombers**	**21**

=== Grey Cup Championship ===
November 28 47th Annual Grey Cup Game: Exhibition Stadium – Toronto, Ontario
Western Champions	Eastern Champions
**Winnipeg Blue Bombers 21**	Hamilton Tiger-Cats 7
**The Winnipeg Blue Bombers are the 1959 Grey Cup Champions**
**Charlie Shepard (RB), Winnipeg Blue Bombers – Grey Cup's Most Valuable Player.**

== CFL leaders ==
- CFL passing leaders
- CFL rushing leaders
- CFL receiving leaders

== 1959 Eastern All-Stars ==
=== Offence ===
- QB – Bernie Faloney, Hamilton Tiger-Cats
- RB – Cookie Gilchrist, Toronto Argonauts
- RB – Dave Thelen, Ottawa Rough Riders
- RB – Dick Shatto, Toronto Argonauts
- E – Bobby Simpson, Ottawa Rough Riders
- E – Paul Dekker, Hamilton Tiger-Cats
- FW – Ron Howell, Hamilton Tiger-Cats
- C – Tommy Hugo, Montreal Alouettes
- OG – Kaye Vaughan, Ottawa Rough Riders
- OG – Dave Suminski, Hamilton Tiger-Cats
- OT – Billy Shipp, Montreal Alouettes
- OT – John Barrow, Hamilton Tiger-Cats

=== Defence ===
- DT – Kaye Vaughan, Ottawa Rough Riders
- DT – John Barrow, Hamilton Tiger-Cats
- DE – Pete Neumann, Hamilton Tiger-Cats
- DE – Doug McNichol, Montreal Alouettes
- DG – Vince Scott, Hamilton Tiger-Cats
- LB – Bill Sowalski, Ottawa Rough Riders
- LB – Eddie Bell, Hamilton Tiger-Cats
- LB – Larry Hayes, Ottawa Rough Riders
- LB – Ernie Danjean, Hamilton Tiger-Cats
- DB – Jim Rountree, Toronto Argonauts
- DB – Ralph Goldston, Hamilton Tiger-Cats
- S – Duane Wood, Hamilton Tiger-Cats

== 1959 Western All-Stars ==
=== Offence ===
- QB – Jim Van Pelt, Winnipeg Blue Bombers
- RB – Jackie Parker, Edmonton Eskimos
- RB – Gene Filipski, Calgary Stampeders
- RB – Charlie Shepard, Winnipeg Blue Bombers
- RB – Johnny Bright, Edmonton Eskimos
- E – Ernie Pitts, Winnipeg Blue Bombers
- E – Ernie Warlick, Calgary Stampeders
- C – Neil Habig, Saskatchewan Roughriders
- OG – Ed Kotowich, Winnipeg Blue Bombers
- OG – Tom Hinton, British Columbia Lions
- OT – Frank Rigney, Winnipeg Blue Bombers
- OT – Roger Nelson, Edmonton Eskimos

=== Defence ===
- DT – Art Walker, Edmonton Eskimos
- DT – Urban Henry, British Columbia Lions
- DE – Ed Gray, Edmonton Eskimos
- DE – Herb Gray, Winnipeg Blue Bombers
- MG – Steve Patrick, Winnipeg Blue Bombers
- LB – Rollie Miles, Edmonton Eskimos
- LB – Norm Fieldgate, British Columbia Lions
- LB – Garland Warren, Winnipeg Blue Bombers
- LB – Al Ecuyer, Edmonton Eskimos
- DB – Ken Ploen, Winnipeg Blue Bombers
- DB – Bill Jessup, British Columbia Lions
- S – Harvey Wylie, Calgary Stampeders

== 1959 CFL awards ==
- CFL's Most Outstanding Player Award – Johnny Bright (RB), Edmonton Eskimos
- CFL's Most Outstanding Canadian Award – Russ Jackson (QB), Ottawa Rough Riders
- CFL's Most Outstanding Lineman Award – Roger Nelson (OT), Edmonton Eskimos
- Jeff Russel Memorial Trophy (IRFU MVP) – Russ Jackson (QB), Ottawa Rough Riders
- Jeff Nicklin Memorial Trophy (WIFU MVP) - Jackie Parker (QB), Edmonton Eskimos
- Gruen Trophy (IRFU Rookie of the Year) - Joe Poirier (DB), Ottawa Rough Riders
- Dr. Beattie Martin Trophy (WIFU Rookie of the Year) - Henry Janzen (DB), Winnipeg Blue Bombers
- DeMarco–Becket Memorial Trophy (WIFU Outstanding Lineman) - Art Walker (DE), Edmonton Eskimos

== 1959 Miss Grey Cup ==
- Miss BC Lions Anna Finlayson was named Miss Grey Cup 1959
