= Kaye Vaughan =

American gridiron football player (1931–2023)

Profile
- Positions: Offensive tackle, Defensive tackle

Personal information
- Born: June 30, 1931; Concordia, Kansas, U.S.
- Died: February 5, 2023 (aged 91); Knowlton, Quebec, Canada

Career information
- High school: Concordia Jr-Senior Highschool
- College: Tulsa
- NFL draft: 1953: 12th round, 134th overall pick

Career history
- 1953–1964: Ottawa Rough Riders

Awards and highlights
- Grey Cup champion (1960); 2× CFL's Outstanding Lineman Award (1956, 1957); CFL All-Star (1962); 7× CFL East All-Star (1953, 1956, 1957, 1959–1962)
- Canadian Football Hall of Fame (Class of 1978)

Charles Kaye Vaughan (June 30, 1931 – February 5, 2023) was an American-born Canadian professional football player, a lineman with the Ottawa Rough Riders of the Canadian Football League (CFL) for twelve seasons. He won the CFL's Outstanding Lineman Award in 1956 and 1957 and is a member of the Canadian Football Hall of Fame.

In the 1960 Grey Cup championship game with Ottawa leading Edmonton 9-6, he scored the only touchdown of his career to close the scoring (when converted) after recovering a fumbled punt. As a lineman he normally did not carry the ball or score points.

Inducted into the Canadian Football Hall of Fame in 1978, Vaughan was voted 41st on the CFL's top 50 players in a poll conducted by Canadian sports network TSN, one of a few players from the 1950s who was included.

== Early life ==
Born and raised in the United States, Vaughan played high school football at Concordia Junior-Senior High School in Concordia, Kansas, and graduated in 1949. He played college football at the University of Tulsa from 1950 to 1952, and was inducted into its hall of fame in 1990.

== Personal life ==
Vaughan married alpine ski racer Lucile Wheeler of Quebec in 1960. She was a double world champion in downhill and giant slalom in 1958 and won the Lou Marsh Trophy. Wheeler also won a bronze medal in downhill at the 1956 Winter Olympics and is a member of the Canadian Sports Hall of Fame. For a time they lived in Ottawa, where he played football through 1964, but in 1967 moved to the village of Knowlton in Quebec's Eastern Townships. Vaughan's son Jake was born in 1963 in Ottawa and went on to play in the CFL with the Toronto Argonauts from 1987 to 1988.

He died at home in Knowlton, on February 5, 2023, at the age of 91.
