= Ron Watton =

Canadian football player (born c. 1932)

Ronald Joseph Watton
No. 42, 44
- Positions: Centre, Linebacker

Personal information
- Born: 21 July 1932; Sutton, Ontario, Canada
- Died: 30 October 2023 (aged 91); British Columbia, Canada
- Listed height: 6 ft 1 in (1.85 m)
- Listed weight: 228 lb (103 kg)

Career history
- 1953–1954: Toronto Argonauts
- 1956–1961: BC Lions
- 1962: Hamilton Tiger-Cats

Awards and highlights
- CFL East All-Star (1962)

Ron Watton (July 21, 1932- Oct. 30, 2023 Toronto Star Obituary section Dec. 16,2023) was a Canadian professional football player who played for the Toronto Argonauts, BC Lions and Hamilton Tiger-Cats. He previously played football with the Toronto Balmy Beach Beachers.
