= Jim Trimble =

American football coach (1918–2006)

Personal information
- Born: May 29, 1918; McKeesport, Pennsylvania, US
- Died: May 23, 2006 (aged 87); Indianapolis, Indiana, US

Career information
- College: Indiana

Career history
- Wichita State (1946–1947) Line coach; Wichita State (1948–1950) Head coach; Philadelphia Eagles (1951) Defensive backs coach; Philadelphia Eagles (1952–1955) Head coach; Hamilton Tiger-Cats (1957–1962) Head coach; Montreal Alouettes (1963–1965) Head coach; New York Giants (1967–1968) Offensive line coach; New York Giants (1969–1981) Director of player personnel; New York Giants (1982–1991) Consultant/scout

Awards and highlights
- As coach: Grey Cup champion (1957); Annis Stukus Trophy (1961); As administrator: 2× Super Bowl champion (XXI, XXV)

Head coaching record
- Regular season: NFL: 25–20–3 (.552); CFL: 87–71 –2 (.550); NCAA: 13–14–3 (.483)
- Postseason: CFL: 10–11 (.476)
- Career: CFL: 97–72–2 (.573)
- Coaching profile at Pro Football Reference

James William Trimble (May 29, 1918 – May 23, 2006) was an American gridiron football coach who served as head coach in both the National Football League (NFL) and the Canadian Football League (CFL) In the NFL, he spent four years leading the Philadelphia Eagles, before spending the next decade in the CFL, most notably with the Hamilton Tiger-Cats, followed by an over 20-year career with the New York Giants. Known for being one of few individuals to be part of Grey Cup and Super Bowl championship teams, he was a key figure in the development of the single-stanchion goal post.

== Early life and career ==
Trimble grew up in McKeesport, Pennsylvania. He worked in the steel mills dragging slag off the steel melts in the furnaces. In 1936 he was left tackle on the football team of Elgin Academy (a private prep school) in Elgin, Ill. Growing up poor, it is unknown who sponsored his enrollment. He quickly became a campus favorite. He immersed himself in his studies. He excelled in football, wrestling, even the men's choir. The Hilltoppers were undefeated in 1936 and 1937.

Following his year at Elgin he was accepted at Indiana University playing tackle for three years beginning in 1939. It was also here that he met the love of his life, his wife, Patricia Olmstead. After graduating in 1942, he entered the US Navy, marrying Patricia before being "shipped out," to the South Pacific spending the next three years in the service during World War II. They would have six children between 1948 & 1958. Upon the end of the conflict, he was named a line coach at Wichita State University, then became the school's head coach at the end of the 1947 season. Trimble held that position for three seasons and his overall coaching record at Wichita State was 13 wins, 14 losses, and 3 ties.

== Philadelphia Eagles ==
After three years with the Shockers, a time in which he also served as the school's athletic director, Trimble accepted an assistant coaching position with the Eagles in 1951. Bo McMillin, the man who had hired him, was diagnosed with cancer early in that first season and resigned in favor of Wayne Millner. When Millner himself resigned on September 8, 1952, Trimble was promoted to head coach. At 34, he was at that time the youngest head coach in the NFL & was for decades was still one of the youngest ever.

During his first three years, Philadelphia finished second in each season to the Cleveland Browns, with Trimble awarded a three-year contract after the team's second straight runner up finish in 1953. Entering the 1955 NFL season, the Eagles were expected to strongly challenge the defending champion Browns, but when the team fell to 4–7–1, Trimble was fired on December 12. During his four years with the Eagles, he had compiled a mark of 25–20–3.

== Canadian Football League ==
Trimble was not out of work long, accepting the head coaching position of the CFL's Hamilton Tiger-Cats on December 29, signing a one-year deal. After that first season, Trimble was a candidate for the head coaching job at his alma mater, Indiana, but remained north of the border. That decision would prove to be a wise one as the Tiger-Cats battled their way to a Grey Cup title in 1957. They capped the season with a 32–7 win over the Winnipeg Blue Bombers, who were led by Trimble's former Eagle's player, Bud Grant.

That victory would sow the seeds of a rivalry when Trimble's team scored a meaningless touchdown in the waning moments of the contest. Angered by Hamilton running up the score, Winnipeg got its revenge one year later when they upset the Tiger-Cats, 35–28. Using the previous season's contest as motivation, the Blue Bombers also were aided when Trimble said days before the contest, "We'll waffle 'em. We'll leave 'em with lumps on the front and the back." The waffle would become a notorious symbol of Trimble's career, with Winnipeg fans jokingly presenting him one the following year.

After losing out to Vince Lombardi for the Green Bay Packers head coaching job in January 1959, Trimble endured continued frustration in three of the succeeding four CFL campaigns when Hamilton lost in the Grey Cup, each time to Winnipeg. In early 1963, Trimble left Hamilton to take the reins of the Montreal Alouettes, but after three losing seasons, he was unable to recapture the magic and was fired on November 18, 1965. Shortly after his dismissal, Trimble allegedly assaulted Montreal Star sportswriter Ian McDonald, but was able to avoid any trouble by apologizing to the journalist.

During his CFL career, he gained a nickname, "Jungle Jim", in part for his reputation in making controversial statements that spurred his running feud with Winnipeg. He later noted that his comments were made to draw attention to the league, and thus make it more marketable. His efforts succeeded in Hamilton, where by 1962, attendance had risen to 23,000 per game.

== Later career ==
Out of football during 1966, Trimble remained in Canada for scouting. During a scouting trip in British Columbia with former player Dave Skrein, who recalled a play where the receiver caught a ball down the field only to hit the goal post. As he related later, "I came back after the game and was sitting around with a friend of mine, Joel Rottman, and we were talking about the double posts and wondered why they couldn't be changed. I forget who first doodled it on the table cloth, but we came up with the idea of having the one post. Then Cedric Marsh, a British engineer for the Aluminium Corporation of Canada stationed in Montreal, developed the single post to be strong enough and we patented it. I'm still collecting royalties." The single-stanchion goal post was supported by only one post, instead of the two aka the "H" that had been the standard since the game began, would soon be marketed heavily. The so-called "slingshot" goalposts, named because of their "Y" shape, were adopted by CFL in 1966 and by the NFL in 1967, just after Trimble returned to coaching as an offensive line assistant with the New York Giants. Trimble had been offered the job by head coach Allie Sherman while attempting to sell the team his innovative goal posts.

The "slingshot" goal post was soon adopted by the NFL and the CFL during his time promoting the new design. It revolutionized the game, making it not only easier for kickers to identify the uprights but erased the injuries of the past whereby receivers, running backs, and defensive players would hit or run into one of the two poles used to support the cross bar in the traditional "H" design. Schools & universities followed (the threat of injury was diminished even further, when the NFL moved the goalpost six feet to the back of the end zone in 1974).

When Sherman was fired during the 1969 preseason, Trimble was transferred to the scouting department, where he would spend the next 12 years as director of player personnel. He announced his resignation in 1982 only to serve as a scout for the team for the next ten years. His efforts helped rebuild "Big Blue" into one of the most dominant teams of the 1980s, earning him a Super Bowl ring in 1987 and 1991.

== Personal life ==
Trimble married twice, having six children with his first wife prior to her death in 1991. He was survived by 13 grandchildren when he died. He moved from Lehigh Valley to Indianapolis, Indiana on his retirement in the 1990s. Trimble died from emphysema in 2006, less than a week before his 88th birthday.

== Head coaching record ==
=== College ===
Year	Team	Overall	Conference	Standing	Bowl/playoffs
Wichita Shockers (Missouri Valley Conference) (1948–1950)
1948	Wichita	5–4–1	2–1–1	2nd	
1949	Wichita	3–6–1	2–3–1	4th	
1950	Wichita	5–4–1	3–2	3rd	
Wichita:		13–14–3	7–6–2		
Total:		13–14–3			
