= John Welton =

Canadian football player

Profile
- Position: End

Personal information
- Born: December 9, 1929
- Died: May 9, 2013 (aged 83)
- Listed height: 6 ft 4 in (1.93 m)
- Listed weight: 230 lb (104 kg)

Career information
- College: Wake Forest, Stanford
- University: Queen's

Career history
- 1950: Montreal Alouettes
- 1952–1955: Ottawa Rough Riders
- 1955–1958: Toronto Argonauts

John William Welton (December 9, 1929 – May 9, 2013) was a Canadian football player who played for the Montreal Alouettes, Ottawa Rough Riders and Toronto Argonauts. He played college football at Wake Forest University, Queen's University and Stanford University.
