= 1962 CFL season =

Canadian Football League season

- Duration: June – October, 1962
- East champions: Hamilton Tiger-Cats
- West champions: Winnipeg Blue Bombers

50th Grey Cup
- Date: December 1 & 2, 1962
- Venue: Exhibition Stadium, Toronto
- Champions: Winnipeg Blue Bombers

CFL seasons
- 1961 1963

Canadian Football League team locations: West, East

The 1962 CFL season is considered to be the ninth season in modern-day Canadian football, although it is officially the fifth Canadian Football League season.

== CFL news in 1962 ==
The Canadian Football Hall of Fame was established in Hamilton.

The 50th Grey Cup game, nicknamed "The Fog Bowl", was postponed due to fog on Saturday, December 1. The final 9 minutes and 29 seconds was played on Sunday as the Winnipeg Blue Bombers defeated the Hamilton Tiger-Cats, 28–27 to win their third championship in four years.

This was the most recent CFL season with average attendance of under 20,000 spectators per game.

== Regular season standings ==
West Division
Pos	Team	Pld	W	L	T	PF	PA	PD	Pts
1	Winnipeg Blue Bombers (C, Q)	16	11	5	0	385	291	+94	22
2	Calgary Stampeders (Q)	16	9	6	1	352	335	+17	19
3	Saskatchewan Roughriders (Q)	16	8	7	1	268	336	−68	17
4	BC Lions	16	7	9	0	346	342	+4	14
5	Edmonton Eskimos	16	6	9	1	310	346	−36	13

(C) First round bye; (Q) Qualified for playoffs

East Division
Pos	Team	Pld	W	L	T	PF	PA	PD	Pts
1	Hamilton Tiger-Cats (C, Q)	14	9	4	1	358	286	+72	19
2	Ottawa Rough Riders (Q)	14	6	7	1	339	302	+37	13
3	Montreal Alouettes (Q)	14	4	7	3	308	309	−1	11
4	Toronto Argonauts	14	4	10	0	259	378	−119	8

(C) First round bye; (Q) Qualified for playoffs

Winnipeg and Hamilton have first round byes.

== Grey Cup playoffs ==
Note: All dates in 1962

=== Conference Semi-Finals ===
Western Semi-Finals
Saskatchewan Roughriders vs Calgary Stampeders
Game	Date	Away	Home
1	November 10	Saskatchewan Roughriders 0	Calgary Stampeders 25
2	November 12	Calgary Stampeders 18	Saskatchewan Roughriders 7
Calgary won the total-point series 43–7

Eastern Semi-Finals
Montreal Alouettes @ Ottawa Rough Riders
Date	Away	Home
November 10	Montreal Alouettes 18	Ottawa Rough Riders 17

=== Conference Finals ===
Western-Finals
Winnipeg Blue Bombers vs Calgary Stampeders
Game	Date	Away	Home
1	November 17	Winnipeg Blue Bombers 14	Calgary Stampeders 20
2	November 21	Calgary Stampeders 11	Winnipeg Blue Bombers 19
3	November 24	Calgary Stampeders 7	Winnipeg Blue Bombers 12
Winnipeg wins the best of three series 2–1

Eastern Finals
Hamilton Tiger-Cats vs Montreal Alouettes
Game	Date	Away	Home
1	November 17	Hamilton Tiger-Cats 28	Montreal Alouettes 17
2	November 24	Montreal Alouettes 21	Hamilton Tiger-Cats 30
Hamilton won total-point series 58–38

== Playoff bracket ==
Division Semifinals
East
E2	Ottawa Rough Riders	7
E3	Montreal Alouettes	18
West
W2	Calgary Stampeders	43 (25+18)
W3	Saskatchewan Roughriders	7 (0+7)

Division Finals
E1	Hamilton Tiger-Cats	58 (28+30)
E3	Montreal Alouettes	38 (17+21)
W1	Winnipeg Blue Bombers	2 (14,19,12)
W2	Calgary Stampeders	1 (20,11,7)

50th Grey Cup
E1	Hamilton Tiger-Cats	27
W1	Winnipeg Blue Bombers	28

=== Grey Cup Championship ===
December 1 & December 2 50th Annual Grey Cup Game: Exhibition Stadium – Toronto, Ontario
Western Champion	Eastern Champion
Winnipeg Blue Bombers 28	Hamilton Tiger-Cats 27
The Winnipeg Blue Bombers are the 1962 Grey Cup Champions
Leo Lewis (RB), Winnipeg Blue Bombers – Grey Cup's Most Valuable Player.

== CFL leaders ==
- CFL passing leaders
- CFL rushing leaders
- CFL receiving leaders

== 1962 CFL All-Stars ==
=== Offence ===
- QB – Eagle Day, Calgary Stampeders
- RB – Earl Lunsford, Calgary Stampeders
- RB – George Dixon, Montreal Alouettes
- RB – Leo Lewis, Winnipeg Blue Bombers
- RB – Ray Purdin, Saskatchewan Roughriders
- OE – Hal Patterson, Hamilton Tiger-Cats
- OE – Tommy Joe Coffey, Edmonton Eskimos
- C – Neil Habig, Saskatchewan Roughriders
- OG – Tony Pajaczkowski, Calgary Stampeders
- OG – Gerry Patrick, Toronto Argonauts
- OT – Frank Rigney, Winnipeg Blue Bombers
- OT – Bronko Nagurski Jr., Hamilton Tiger-Cats

=== Defence ===
- DT – Don Luzzi, Calgary Stampeders
- DT – John Barrow, Hamilton Tiger-Cats
- DE – Garner Ekstran, Saskatchewan Roughriders
- DE – Herb Gray, Winnipeg Blue Bombers
- MG – Kaye Vaughan, Ottawa Rough Riders
- LB – Wayne Harris, Calgary Stampeders
- LB – Tom Brown, BC Lions
- LB – Gord Rowland, Winnipeg Blue Bombers
- LB – Jim Conroy, Ottawa Rough Riders
- DB – Harvey Wylie, Calgary Stampeders
- DB – Don Sutherin, Hamilton Tiger-Cats
- S – Jim Rountree, Toronto Argonauts

== 1962 Eastern All-Stars ==
=== Offence ===
- QB – Russ Jackson, Ottawa Rough Riders
- RB – Dick Shatto, Toronto Argonauts
- RB – George Dixon, Montreal Alouettes
- RB – Ernie White, Ottawa Rough Riders
- F – Bobby Kuntz, Hamilton Tiger-Cats
- OE – Hal Patterson, Hamilton Tiger-Cats
- OE – Marv Luster, Montreal Alouettes
- C – Ron Watton, Hamilton Tiger-Cats
- OG – Hardiman Cureton, Hamilton Tiger-Cats
- OG – Ellison Kelly, Hamilton Tiger-Cats
- OT – Moe Racine, Ottawa Rough Riders
- OT – Bronko Nagurski Jr., Hamilton Tiger-Cats

=== Defence ===
- DT – John Barrow, Hamilton Tiger-Cats
- DT – Bobby Jack Oliver, Montreal Alouettes
- DE – Billy Ray Locklin, Montreal Alouettes
- DE – Mel Semenko, Ottawa Rough Riders
- MG – Kaye Vaughan, Ottawa Rough Riders
- LB – Zeno Karcz, Hamilton Tiger-Cats
- LB – Jim Andreotti, Toronto Argonauts
- LB – Ed Nickla, Montreal Alouettes
- LB – Jim Conroy, Ottawa Rough Riders
- DB – Joe Poirier, Ottawa Rough Riders
- DB – Don Sutherin, Hamilton Tiger-Cats
- S – Jim Rountree, Toronto Argonauts

== 1962 Western All-Stars ==
=== Offence ===
- QB – Eagle Day, Calgary Stampeders
- RB – Earl Lunsford, Calgary Stampeders
- RB – Nub Beamer, BC Lions
- RB – Leo Lewis, Winnipeg Blue Bombers
- RB – Ray Purdin, Saskatchewan Roughriders
- OE – Pete Manning, Calgary Stampeders
- OE – Tommy Joe Coffey, Edmonton Eskimos
- C – Neil Habig, Saskatchewan Roughriders
- OG – Tony Pajaczkowski, Calgary Stampeders
- OG – Sherwyn Thorson, Winnipeg Blue Bombers
- OT – Frank Rigney, Winnipeg Blue Bombers
- OT – Lonnie Dennis, BC Lions

=== Defence ===
- DT – Don Luzzi, Calgary Stampeders
- DT – Roger Savoie, Winnipeg Blue Bombers
- DE – Garner Ekstran, Saskatchewan Roughriders
- DE – Herb Gray, Winnipeg Blue Bombers
- MG – Ron Atchison, Saskatchewan Roughriders
- LB – Wayne Harris, Calgary Stampeders
- LB – Tom Brown, BC Lions
- LB – Gord Rowland, Winnipeg Blue Bombers
- LB – Bill Burrell, Saskatchewan Roughriders
- DB – Oscar Kruger, Edmonton Eskimos
- DB – Dick Thornton, Winnipeg Blue Bombers
- S – Harvey Wylie, Calgary Stampeders

== 1962 CFL awards ==
- CFL's Most Outstanding Player Award – George Dixon (RB), Montreal Alouettes
- CFL's Most Outstanding Canadian Award – Harvey Wylie (DB), Calgary Stampeders
- CFL's Most Outstanding Lineman Award – John Barrow (DT), Hamilton Tiger-Cats
- CFL's Coach of the Year – Steve Owen, Saskatchewan Roughriders
- Jeff Russel Memorial Trophy (Eastern MVP) – George Dixon (RB), Montreal Alouettes
- Jeff Nicklin Memorial Trophy (Western MVP) - Eagle Day (QB), Calgary Stampeders
- Gruen Trophy (Eastern Rookie of the Year) - Whit Tucker (WR), Ottawa Rough Riders
- Dr. Beattie Martin Trophy (Western Rookie of the Year) - Ted Frechette (DB/RB), Edmonton Eskimos
- DeMarco–Becket Memorial Trophy (Western Outstanding Lineman) - Tom Brown (LB), BC Lions
