= 46th Grey Cup =

1958 Canadian Football championship game

Winnipeg Blue Bombers	Hamilton Tiger-Cats
(13–3)	(10–3–1)
35	28
Head coach: Bud Grant	Head coach: Jim Trimble
	1	2	3	4	Total
Winnipeg Blue Bombers	7	13	7	8	35
Hamilton Tiger-Cats	14	0	14	0	28
- Date: November 29, 1958
- Stadium: Empire Stadium
- Location: Vancouver
- Attendance: 36,567

Broadcasters
- Network: CBC - only on CBLT Toronto
- Announcers: Norm Marshall, Larry O'Brien

The 46th Grey Cup was the championship game of the 1958 season of the Canadian Football League on November 29, 1958. The game was played in Vancouver's Empire Stadium before a crowd of 36,567. The Winnipeg Blue Bombers defeated the Hamilton Tiger-Cats 35–28. This was the first Grey Cup game to be played under the aegis of the newly formed (and present-day) Canadian Football League.

== Game summary ==
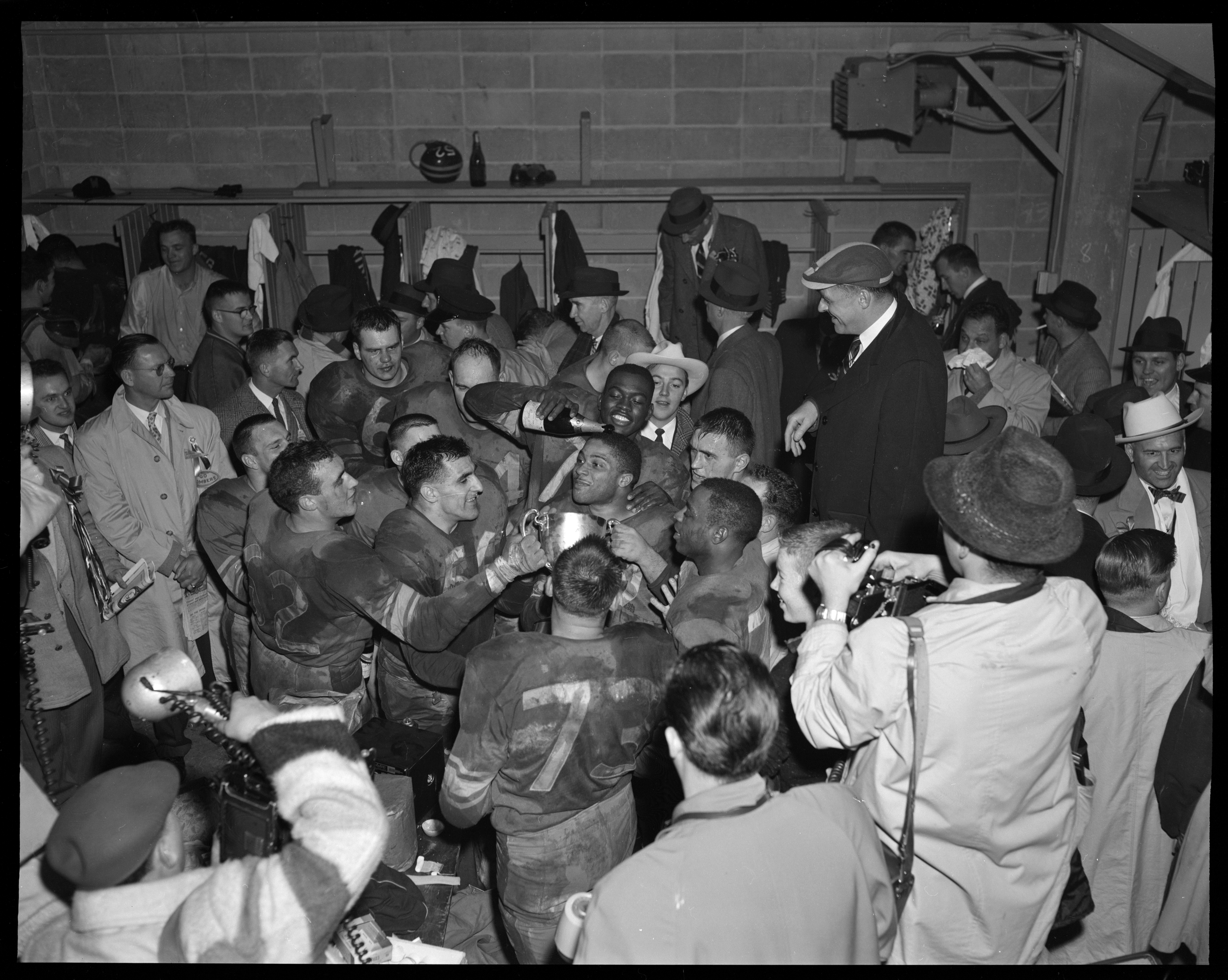
Post-game celebration

Winnipeg Blue Bombers (35) - TDs, Jim Van Pelt (2), Norm Rauhaus, Charlie Shepard. Cons, Van Pelt (4). FGs, Van Pelt (2), Keith Pearce (79). Single, Shepard.

Hamilton Tiger-Cats (28) - TDs, Ron Howell (2), Ralph Goldston, Gerry McDougall. Cons, Steve Oneschuk (4).

Tiger-Cats head coach Jim Trimble said before the game that his team would "waffle" the Blue Bombers.

Hamilton started well, opening a 14-0 lead in the first quarter. Winnipeg had gotten within one point when the Hamilton coach made a controversial call.

Instead of downing the ball before half time, coach Trimble elected to punt the ball away on the last play. The punt was blocked, and recovered in the end zone by Bomber Norm Rauhaus to give them a 20-14 half-time lead. "We should have won the 1958 Grey Cup but there was a bad coaching error before halftime," said Hamilton defensive lineman Angelo Mosca.

In the second half, Hamilton came back to tie, but a Hamilton fumble was recovered by Bomber Gord Rowland which led to a touchdown by Winnipeg fullback Charlie Shepard. Hamilton again fought back to take the lead 28-27. Winnipeg quarterback Jim Van Pelt scored on a trick play where he pitched the ball to running back Leo Lewis, who passed back to Van Pelt for the touchdown. A Sheppard punt single closed out the scoring.

== Video clips ==
Entire game on YouTube

== Trivia ==
Winnipeg racked up 187 passing yards and 247 rushing yards from Shepard, Kenny Ploen, Lewis and Van Pelt. Van Pelt scored two touchdowns, four converts and two field goals, a total of 22 points.

Winnipeg had not won the Grey Cup in seventeen years prior to this game.

The 1958 Grey Cup game is considered to be one of the ten best Grey Cup games of all time.
