= 1957 in Canadian football =

- IRFU champions: Hamilton Tiger-Cats
- WIFU champions: Winnipeg Blue Bombers

45th Grey Cup
- Champions: Hamilton Tiger-Cats

Seasons seasons
- 1956 1958

The Hamilton Tiger-Cats defeat the Winnipeg Blue Bombers in the Grey Cup.

== Canadian Football News in 1957 ==
In March 1957, the CRU officially adopted a resolution allowing the Ontario Rugby Football Union (ORFU) to retain its constitutional right to challenge for the Grey Cup but left it up to the Western Interprovincial Football Union and the Interprovincial Rugby Football Union to decide when the ORFU had sufficiently improved its calibre of play.

The Canadian Football Council (CFC) allowed interference to be legal up to third 5-yard stripe by eligible blockers.

The 45th annual Grey Cup game was televised live from coast to coast in Canada for the first time. TV rights brought in $125,000 for the CFC.

== Regular season ==
=== Final regular season standings ===
Note: GP = Games Played, W = Wins, L = Losses, T = Ties, PF = Points For, PA = Points Against, Pts = Points

**Western Interprovincial Football Union**
| Team | GP | W | L | T | PF | PA | Pts |
|---|---|---|---|---|---|---|---|
| **Edmonton Eskimos** | 16 | 14 | 2 | 0 | 475 | 142 | 28 |
| **Winnipeg Blue Bombers** | 16 | 12 | 4 | 0 | 406 | 300 | 24 |
| **Calgary Stampeders** | 16 | 6 | 10 | 0 | 221 | 413 | 12 |
| BC Lions | 16 | 4 | 11 | 1 | 284 | 369 | 9 |
| Saskatchewan Roughriders | 16 | 3 | 12 | 1 | 276 | 438 | 7 |

**Interprovincial Rugby Football Union**
| Team | GP | W | L | T | PF | PA | Pts |
|---|---|---|---|---|---|---|---|
| **Hamilton Tiger-Cats** | 14 | 10 | 4 | 0 | 250 | 189 | 20 |
| **Ottawa Rough Riders** | 14 | 8 | 6 | 0 | 326 | 237 | 16 |
| **Montreal Alouettes** | 14 | 6 | 8 | 0 | 287 | 301 | 12 |
| Toronto Argonauts | 14 | 4 | 10 | 0 | 274 | 410 | 8 |

**Ontario Rugby Football Union**
| Team | GP | W | L | T | PF | PA | Pts |
|---|---|---|---|---|---|---|---|
| **London Lords** | 12 | 8 | 2 | 2 | 320 | 110 | 18 |
| **Kitchener-Waterloo Dutchmen** | 12 | 8 | 3 | 1 | 280 | 153 | 17 |
| **Sarnia Golden Bears** | 12 | 6 | 5 | 1 | 367 | 169 | 13 |
| Toronto Balmy Beach Beachers | 12 | 0 | 12 | 0 | 35 | 570 | 0 |

- Bold text means that they have clinched the playoffs.
- Edmonton and Hamilton both have first round byes.

== Grey Cup playoffs ==
Note: All dates in 1957

=== Semifinals ===
==== WIFU ====
| Date | Away | Home |
|---|---|---|
| November 9 | Calgary Stampeders 13 | Winnipeg Blue Bombers 13 |
| November 11 | Winnipeg Blue Bombers 15 | Calgary Stampeders 3 |

- Winnipeg won the total-point series by 28–16. The Blue Bombers will play the Edmonton Eskimos in the WIFU Finals.

==== IRFU ====
| Date | Away | Home |
|---|---|---|
| November 13 | Montreal Alouettes 24 | Ottawa Rough Riders 15 |

- The Alouettes will play the Hamilton Tiger-Cats in the IRFU Finals.

=== Finals ===
==== WIFU ====
| Date | Away | Home |
|---|---|---|
| November 16 | Edmonton Eskimos 7 | Winnipeg Blue Bombers 19 |
| November 20 | Winnipeg Blue Bombers 4 | Edmonton Eskimos 5 |
| November 23 | Winnipeg Blue Bombers 17 (OT) | Edmonton Eskimos 2 |

- Winnipeg wins the best of three series 2–1. The Blue Bombers will advance to the Grey Cup game.

==== IRFU ====
| Date | Away | Home |
|---|---|---|
| November 16 | Hamilton Tiger-Cats 17 | Montreal Alouettes 10 |
| November 23 | Montreal Alouettes 1 | Hamilton Tiger-Cats 39 |

- Hamilton won the total-point series by 56–11. The Tiger-Cats will advance to the Grey Cup game.

== Playoff Bracket ==
Quarterfinals
IRFU
2 | Ottawa Rough Riders | 15
3 | Montreal Alouettes | 24
WIFU
2 | Winnipeg Blue Bombers | 28 (13+15)
3 | Calgary Stampeders | 16 (13+3)

Semifinals
1 | Hamilton Tiger-Cats | 56 (17+39)
3 | Montreal Alouettes | 11 (10+1)
1 | Edmonton Eskimos | 1 (7,5,2)
2 | Winnipeg Blue Bombers | 2 (19,4,17)

45th Grey Cup
I1 | Hamilton Tiger-Cats | 32
W2 | Winnipeg Blue Bombers | 7

== Grey Cup Championship ==
November 30 The 45th Grey Cup – Toronto, Ontario
| Hamilton Tiger-Cats 32 | Winnipeg Blue Bombers 7 |
The Hamilton Tiger-Cats are the 1957 Grey Cup Champions

== Canadian Football Leaders ==
- CFL passing leaders
- CFL rushing leaders
- CFL receiving leaders

== 1957 Eastern (Interprovincial Rugby Football Union) All-Stars ==
=== Offence ===
- QB – Sam Etcheverry, Montreal Alouettes
- RB – Cookie Gilchrist, Hamilton Tiger-Cats
- RB – Gerry McDougall, Hamilton Tiger-Cats
- RB – Dick Shatto, Toronto Argonauts
- E – Hal Patterson, Montreal Alouettes
- E – Menan Schriewer, Toronto Argonauts
- FW – Bobby Simpson, Ottawa Rough Riders
- C – Tommy Hugo, Montreal Alouettes
- OG – Dave Suminski, Hamilton Tiger-Cats
- OG – Larry Hayes, Ottawa Rough Riders
- OT – Kaye Vaughan, Ottawa Rough Riders
- OT – John Barrow, Hamilton Tiger-Cats

=== Defence ===
- DT – Kaye Vaughan, Ottawa Rough Riders
- DT – John Barrow, Hamilton Tiger-Cats
- DE – Pete Neumann, Hamilton Tiger-Cats
- DE – John Welton, Toronto Argonauts
- DG – Vince Scott, Hamilton Tiger-Cats
- DG – Larry Hayes, Ottawa Rough Riders
- LB – Tommy Hugo, Montreal Alouettes
- LB – Tony Curcillo, Hamilton Tiger-Cats
- DB – Hal Patterson, Montreal Alouettes
- DB – Ralph Goldston, Hamilton Tiger-Cats
- DB – Bobby Kuntz, Toronto Argonauts
- S – Bobby Simpson, Ottawa Rough Riders

== 1957 Western (Western Interprovincial Football Union) All-Stars ==
=== Offence ===
- QB – Ken Ploen, Winnipeg Blue Bombers
- RB – By Bailey, British Columbia Lions
- RB – Gerry James, Winnipeg Blue Bombers
- RB – Jackie Parker, Edmonton Eskimos
- RB – Johnny Bright, Edmonton Eskimos
- E – Jack Gotta, Calgary Stampeders
- E – Ernie Pitts, Winnipeg Blue Bombers
- C – Galen Wahlmeier, Saskatchewan Roughriders
- OG – Harry Langford, Calgary Stampeders
- OG – Ed Sharkey, British Columbia Lions
- OT – Dick Huffman, Calgary Stampeders
- OT – Roger Nelson, Edmonton Eskimos

=== Defence ===
- DT – Dick Huffman, Calgary Stampeders
- DT – Buddy Tinsley, Winnipeg Blue Bombers
- DE – Frank Anderson, Edmonton Eskimos
- DE – Herb Gray, Winnipeg Blue Bombers
- MG – Art Walker, Edmonton Eskimos
- LB – Ed Sharkey, British Columbia Lions
- LB – Gord Rowland, Winnipeg Blue Bombers
- LB – Bobby Marlow, Saskatchewan Roughriders
- LB – Ted Tully, Edmonton Eskimos
- DB – Jack Gotta, Calgary Stampeders
- DB – Larry Isbell, Saskatchewan Roughriders
- S – Oscar Kruger, Edmonton Eskimos

== 1957 Canadian Football Awards ==
- Most Outstanding Player Award – Jackie Parker (RB), Edmonton Eskimos
- Most Outstanding Canadian Award – Gerry James (RB), Winnipeg Blue Bombers
- Most Outstanding Lineman Award – Kaye Vaughan (OT/DT), Ottawa Rough Riders
- Jeff Russel Memorial Trophy (IRFU MVP) – Dick Shatto (RB), Toronto Argonauts
- Jeff Nicklin Memorial Trophy (WIFU MVP) - Jackie Parker (QB), Edmonton Eskimos
- Gruen Trophy (IRFU Rookie of the Year) - Gary W.C. Williams (HB), Toronto Argonauts
- Dr. Beattie Martin Trophy (WIFU Rookie of the Year) - Mike Lashuk (FB), Edmonton Eskimos
- DeMarco–Becket Memorial Trophy (WIFU Outstanding Lineman) - Art Walker (DE), Edmonton Eskimos
- Imperial Oil Trophy (ORFU MVP) - ???

== 1957 Miss Grey Cup ==
- Miss BC Lions Carol Lucas was named Miss Grey Cup 1957
