= 50th Grey Cup =

1962 Canadian Football championship game

Winnipeg Blue Bombers	Hamilton Tiger-Cats
(11–5)	(9–4–1)
28	27
Head coach: Bud Grant	Head coach: Jim Trimble
	1	2	3	4	Total
Winnipeg Blue Bombers	0	21	7	0	28
Hamilton Tiger-Cats	6	13	8	0	27
- Date: December 1–2, 1962
- Stadium: Exhibition Stadium
- Location: Toronto
- Most Valuable Player: Leo Lewis, RB (Blue Bombers)
- National anthem: Local Mens Chorus
- Referee: Paul Dojack
- Attendance: 32,655

Broadcasters
- Network: CBC, CTV, SRC (Canada); ABC (USA)

The 50th Grey Cup, also nicknamed the Fog Bowl, was the 1962 Grey Cup Canadian Football League championship game played between the Winnipeg Blue Bombers and the Hamilton Tiger-Cats at Toronto's Exhibition Stadium. It started on December 1, 1962 and wasn't completed until the next day after being suspended in the 4th quarter due to fog. It remains the only Grey Cup game ever suspended during play, and the first to be finished on a Sunday. The game was won by the Blue Bombers with the score of 28–27, and is considered to be one of the greatest Grey Cup games of all time.

== Fog Bowl ==
The game started on Saturday, December 1. However, by the second quarter, a thick fog started to roll in over the field, a combination of cold, moist, humid air from Lake Ontario. The fog was thick enough that fans could not see the action on the field, receivers lost sight of the ball after it left the quarterbacks' hand, and punt returners could not find punts until they hit the ground.

The fog became worse as the afternoon wore on, and with 9 minutes and 29 seconds left in the fourth quarter, the game was suspended with Winnipeg leading 28–27. The game continued the following afternoon, but there was no further scoring, thus securing the Bomber win.

== Game summary ==
Thick advection fog rolled in prior to halftime. The dense fog restricted visibility to all the fans present. Players could also not see and find the ball during passes and punts. The reduced visibility made it difficult for the referees to properly officiate. Paul Dojack, the referee, stopped the game with Winnipeg leading 28–27. After a 20-minute delay, CFL commissioner Syd Halter decided that the remainder of the game would be played the following afternoon.

The Tiger-Cats drew first blood in the opening quarter when Garney Henley took advantage of some good blocking and sprinted 74 yards for a major. The convert by Don Sutherin was no good, his first of three crucial errors in the game. A 41-yard scamper by Kenny Ploen set up a Leo Lewis TD to begin a wild second quarter, giving Winnipeg a 7–6 lead. Lewis struck again when he took a handoff, ran wide and threw a 15-yard pass to Charlie Shepard in the end zone.

Hamilton cut the deficit to 14–12, first on a goal-line leap by Bobby Kuntz, then on an 18-yard touchdown run by Henley following a Winnipeg fumble. Sutherin was only good on one convert, however, giving the Ti-Cats a 19–14 advantage. Winnipeg regained the lead before halftime when Lewis caught a lateral pass by Funston and ran 30 yards for another major. The Blue Bombers took a 21–19 lead into the intermission.

Hamilton quarterback Joe Zuger came out throwing in the third quarter, completing a 53-yard strike to Henley and a 36-yard touchdown throw to Dave Viti. But Shepard responded with a 4-yard touchdown run, his second major of the game, and Winnipeg had the lead for good. Gerry James added his fourth convert for a 28-26 advantage.

The Ti-Cats had an opportunity to regain the lead late in the third quarter, but Sutherin missed on a 30-yard field goal, giving Hamilton just a single point. Both teams were held pointless in the final quarter (spread over two days) as the Bombers held on to win their fourth title in five years. Shepard was selected Most Valuable Player of the game.

== Trivia ==
Afternoon fog in Toronto is a rare occurrence, but the Fog Bowl was just one of several weather disasters to occur at Exhibition Stadium. The stadium's proximity to Lake Ontario made it susceptible to rapid weather changes and extreme conditions. It remains the site of the only Major League Baseball game to be played with snow on the field (the Toronto Blue Jays' inaugural game on April 7, 1977), and the only major league baseball game to be suspended due to high wind. The 1982 Grey Cup (the Rain Bowl) was played in a driving rain. The limitations of Exhibition Stadium eventually led to the construction of the retractable-roof SkyDome, now known as Rogers Centre. During its life as a professional sports stadium, local press and Torontonians often referred to Exhibition Stadium under the moniker "Mistake by the Lake".

The 1962 Grey Cup was the first CFL contest to be broadcast by an American TV network, when ABC's Wide World of Sports carried the game in the United States. (The game, which was shown live on the CBC starting at 12:30pm in Toronto, was shown on ABC via tape delay beginning at 4:00 Eastern time. The end of the contest the next day was carried by the CBC but not ABC.) It would be the only CFL game to air on a US network until 1980, when the nascent ESPN cable network acquired American broadcast rights to the league. The first CFL game seen on ESPN was on July 9, 1980, when the Montreal defeated Toronto, 18-11.

== Aftermath ==
The following year, the CFL adopted a new rule in case play in the Grey Cup game had to be suspended. If a suspension occurred before the end of the third quarter, it would be resumed at the same point the next day, as was done in 1962. But if the fourth quarter had already begun, the CFL commissioner would choose between two options: (a) if he considered that one team had a big lead, he would declare the game over; or (b) if the commissioner thought if the game was still close, the score would carry over to the following day -- but instead of play resuming at the point where it was left off, two ten-minute halves would be played, each starting with a kickoff.

Eventually, the CFL adopted a more complex set of rules for weather postponements.

== See also ==
- Game 5 of the 2008 World Series - a game in which weather conditions also led to its suspension until the next day.

== Sources ==
- "Fog Bowl". Fog Bowl: The 1962 Grey Cup. The Canadian Encyclopedia.
- "Grey Cup: 1962". Canadian Football League. Archived from the original on August 13, 2012.
