= 49th Grey Cup =

1961 Canadian Football championship game

Winnipeg Blue Bombers	Hamilton Tiger-Cats
(13–3)	(10–4)
21	14
Head coach: Bud Grant	Head coach: Jim Trimble
	1	2	3	4	OT	Total
Winnipeg Blue Bombers	0	1	6	7	7	21
Hamilton Tiger-Cats	7	0	7	0	0	14
- Date: December 2, 1961
- Stadium: CNE Stadium
- Location: Toronto
- Most Valuable Player: Ken Ploen, QB (Blue Bombers)
- National anthem: Local Mens Chorus
- Referee: Paul Dojack
- Attendance: 32,651

Broadcasters
- Network: CBC, CTV, SRC

The 49th Grey Cup was the Canadian Football League's championship game of the 1961 season on December 2, 1961. The Winnipeg Blue Bombers defeated the Hamilton Tiger-Cats 21–14 at CNE Stadium in Toronto before 32,651 fans. It is considered to be one of the 10 greatest Grey Cup Games of all time.

== Game summary ==
The score was tied 14–14 at the end of regulation time. The only score in overtime came when Winnipeg quarterback Ken Ploen called his own number and tiptoed down the sideline for the touchdown.

== Trivia ==
This was the first Grey Cup and only one of four games to go into overtime, the others being the 2005 Grey Cup, the 2016 Grey Cup and the 2021 Grey Cup.

Ingrid Osmolowsky, Miss Hamilton Tiger Cat, was crowned Miss Grey Cup 1961
