= Leo Dandurand Trophy =

The Leo Dandurand Trophy is a Canadian Football League trophy awarded to the Most Outstanding Lineman in the East Division. The winner of this trophy is chosen from a group of nominees, one from each team in the East Division. Either the winner of this trophy or the winner of the DeMarco-Becket Memorial Trophy will also receive the Canadian Football League Most Outstanding Offensive Lineman Award.

In 1995, as part of the failed American Expansion, this trophy was given to the South Division's Most Outstanding Lineman.

Prior to 1974 the CFL's Most Outstanding Lineman Award was awarded to both outstanding defensive players and outstanding linemen in the East Division.

The trophy is named after Leo Dandurand, co-founder of the Montreal Alouettes.

== Leo Dandurand Trophy winners ==
- 2025 – Brandon Revenberg, Hamilton Tiger-Cats
- 2024 – Ryan Hunter (OT/G), Toronto Argonauts
- 2023 – Dejon Allen (OT), Toronto Argonauts
- 2022 – Brandon Revenberg (OG), Hamilton Tiger-Cats
- 2021 – Brandon Revenberg (OG), Hamilton Tiger-Cats
- 2020 – Season cancelled due to COVID-19
- 2019 – Chris Van Zeyl (OT), Hamilton Tiger-Cats
- 2018 – Brandon Revenberg (OG), Hamilton Tiger-Cats
- 2017 – Sean McEwen (C), Toronto Argonauts
- 2016 – Jon Gott (C), Ottawa Redblacks
- 2015 – SirVincent Rogers (OT), Ottawa Redblacks
- 2014 – Jeff Perrett (OT), Montreal Alouettes
- 2013 – Jeff Keeping (C), Toronto Argonauts
- 2012 – Josh Bourke (OT), Montreal Alouettes
- 2011 – Josh Bourke (OT), Montreal Alouettes
- 2010 – Marwan Hage (C), Hamilton Tiger-Cats
- 2009 – Scott Flory (OG), Montreal Alouettes
- 2008 – Scott Flory (OG), Montreal Alouettes
- 2007 – Dan Goodspeed (OT), Winnipeg Blue Bombers
- 2006 – Scott Flory (OG), Montreal Alouettes
- 2005 – Scott Flory (OG), Montreal Alouettes
- 2004 – Uzooma Okeke (OT), Montreal Alouettes
- 2003 – Scott Flory (OG), Montreal Alouettes
- 2002 – Bryan Chiu (C), Montreal Alouettes
- 2001 – Dave Mudge (OT), Winnipeg Blue Bombers
- 2000 – Pierre Vercheval (OG), Montreal Alouettes
- 1999 – Uzooma Okeke (OT), Montreal Alouettes
- 1998 – Uzooma Okeke (OT), Montreal Alouettes
- 1997 – Mike Kiselak (C), Toronto Argonauts
- 1996 – Mike Kiselak (C), Toronto Argonauts
- 1995 – Mike Withycombe (OG), Baltimore Stallions
- 1994 – Shar Pourdanesh (OT), Baltimore CFLers
- 1993 – Chris Walby (OT), Winnipeg Blue Bombers
- 1992 – Robert Smith (OT), Ottawa Rough Riders
- 1991 – Chris Walby (OT), Winnipeg Blue Bombers
- 1990 – Chris Walby (OT), Winnipeg Blue Bombers
- 1989 – Miles Gorrell (OT), Hamilton Tiger-Cats
- 1988 – Ian Beckstead (C), Toronto Argonauts
- 1987 – Chris Walby (OT), Winnipeg Blue Bombers
- 1986 – Miles Gorrell (OT), Hamilton Tiger-Cats
- 1985 – Dan Ferrone (OG), Toronto Argonauts
- 1984 – Dan Ferrone (OG), Toronto Argonauts
- 1983 – Rudy Phillips (OG), Ottawa Rough Riders
- 1982 – Rudy Phillips (OG), Ottawa Rough Riders
- 1981 – Val Belcher (OG), Ottawa Rough Riders
- 1980 – Val Belcher (OG), Ottawa Rough Riders
- 1979 – Ray Watrin (OG), Montreal Alouettes
- 1978 – Jim Coode (OT), Ottawa Rough Riders
- 1977 – Mike Wilson (OT), Toronto Argonauts
- 1976 – Dan Yochum (OT), Montreal Alouettes
- 1975 – Dave Braggins (OG), Montreal Alouettes

== Outstanding Lineman in the East Division prior to the trophy ==
- 1974 – Ed George (OG), Montreal Alouettes

== CFL's Most Outstanding Lineman Award in the East Division prior to the 1974 ==
- 1973 – Ed George (OG), Montreal Alouettes
- 1972 – Jim Stillwagon (DL), Toronto Argonauts
- 1971 – Mark Kosmos (LB), Montreal Alouettes
- 1970 – Angelo Mosca (DL), Hamilton Tiger-Cats
- 1969 – Billy Joe Booth (DE), Ottawa Rough Riders
- 1968 – Ken Lehmann (LB), Ottawa Rough Riders
- 1967 – John Barrow (DL), Hamilton Tiger-Cats
- 1966 – Ken Lehmann (LB), Ottawa Rough Riders
- 1965 – John Barrow (DL), Hamilton Tiger-Cats
- 1964 – John Barrow (DL), Hamilton Tiger-Cats
- 1963 – Angelo Mosca (DL), Hamilton Tiger-Cats
- 1962 – John Barrow (DL), Hamilton Tiger-Cats
- 1961 – John Barrow (DL), Hamilton Tiger-Cats
- 1960 – Kaye Vaughan (OT), Ottawa Rough Riders
- 1959 – John Barrow (DL), Hamilton Tiger-Cats
- 1958 – Jackie Simpson (OG), Montreal Alouettes
- 1957 – Kaye Vaughan (OT), Ottawa Rough Riders
- 1956 – Kaye Vaughan (OT), Ottawa Rough Riders
- 1955 – Tex Coulter (OL), Montreal & Vince Scott, Hamilton
