= SirVincent Rogers =

American gridiron football player (born 1986)

No. 66, 55, 74
- Position: Offensive lineman

Personal information
- Born: May 9, 1986 (age 40); Jasper, Texas, U.S.
- Listed height: 6 ft 4 in (1.93 m)
- Listed weight: 319 lb (145 kg)

Career information
- High school: Jasper
- College: Houston

Career history
- 2009–2010: Miami Dolphins*
- 2010–2011: Hartford Colonials
- 2012: Arizona Rattlers
- 2012: Las Vegas Locomotives
- 2013: Jacksonville Sharks
- 2013–2014: Toronto Argonauts
- 2015–2018: Ottawa Redblacks
- 2019–2021: Edmonton Eskimos / Elks
- 2022: Ottawa Redblacks*
- * Offseason or practice squad member only

Awards and highlights
- Grey Cup champion (2016); ArenaBowl champion (2012); Leo Dandurand Trophy (2015); CFL's Most Outstanding Offensive Lineman Award (2015); 2× CFL All-Star (2015, 2018); 3× CFL East All-Star (2015, 2016, 2018)
- Stats at CFL.ca
- Stats at ArenaFan.com

SirVincent Rogers (born May 9, 1986) is an American former professional football offensive lineman. He won the 104th Grey Cup with the Ottawa Redblacks of the Canadian Football League (CFL). He played college football at the University of Houston. He was also a member of the Miami Dolphins, Hartford Colonials, Arizona Rattlers, Las Vegas Locomotives, Jacksonville Sharks, Toronto Argonauts, and Edmonton Elks.

== Early life ==
Rogers attended Jasper High School in Jasper, Texas.

== Professional career ==
Rogers was signed by the Miami Dolphins of the National Football League on April 30, 2009. He left the team on August 6, 2009. He was re-signed by the Dolphins on February 16, 2010. He was released on March 9, 2010.

Rogers was signed by the Hartford Colonials of the United Football League (UFL) in 2010 and released on September 3, 2010. He re-signed with the Hartford Colonials in 2011 but the team folded.

Rogers was signed by the Arizona Rattlers of the Arena Football League (AFL) in October 2011. The Rattlers went on to win ArenaBowl XXV.

Rogers played for the Las Vegas Locomotives of the UFL during the 2012 season.

Rogers signed with the AFL's Jacksonville Sharks on January 11, 2013. He was placed on the Sharks Other League Exempt list in February 2013.

Rogers was signed by the Toronto Argonauts of the CFL on February 21, 2013. He spent two years with Toronto, playing and starting in 26 games with the team.

Upon entering free agency, Rogers signed with the CFL's Ottawa Redblacks on February 11, 2015. Rogers played in 30 games for the Redblacks during his first two seasons in Ottawa. He was named a CFL All-Star in 2015 and was awarded the distinction of being the CFL's Most Outstanding Linemen for that season. Rogers won the 104th Grey Cup to conclude the 2016 season. Following the season he was re-signed by the Redblacks to a new two-year contract.

Rogers signed with the Edmonton Eskimos for the 2019 season, but was injured before the season began and sat out all year. He did not play in 2020 due to the cancellation of the 2020 CFL season. He signed a one-year contract extension with the Edmonton Elks on February 4, 2021. He played in three games for the Elks in 2021 and was released on December 28, 2021.

On January 28, 2022, Rogers signed a one-day contract with the Ottawa Redblacks and announced his retirement from professional football.
