= Scott Flory =

Canadian gridiron football player and coach (born 1976)

Saskatchewan Huskies
- Title: Head coach
- CFL status: National

Personal information
- Born: July 15, 1976 (age 50); Regina, Saskatchewan, Canada
- Listed height: 6 ft 4 in (1.93 m)
- Listed weight: 300 lb (136 kg)

Career information
- University: Saskatchewan
- CFL draft: 1998: 3rd round, 15th overall pick

Career history

Playing
- 1999–2013: Montreal Alouettes

Coaching
- 2014–2016: Saskatchewan Huskies (Offensive coordinator)
- 2017–present: Saskatchewan Huskies (Head coach)

Operations
- 2014–2016: CFLPA (President)

Awards and highlights
- 3× Grey Cup champion (2002, 2009, 2010); 2× Most Outstanding Offensive Lineman (2008, 2009); 5× Leo Dandurand Trophy (2003, 2005, 2006, 2008, 2009); 9× CFL All-Star (2002, 2003, 2005–2010, 2012); 11× CFL East All-Star (2002–2012)

Career CFL statistics
- Games played: 241
- Stats at CFL.ca (archive)
- Canadian Football Hall of Fame (Class of 2018)

Scott Flory (born July 15, 1976) is the head coach of the University of Saskatchewan's Huskies football team. He is also a former professional Canadian football offensive lineman who played for 15 years for the Montreal Alouettes of the Canadian Football League.

Shortly after retiring, Flory was elected as the tenth president of the Canadian Football League Players' Association, a role he served until 2016.

== University career ==
Flory played CIAU football for the Saskatchewan Huskies from 1994 to 1998. He won two Vanier Cup championships while playing for the team, in 1996 and 1998. He was also named a CIAU All-Canadian twice and a Canada West All-Star three times.

== Professional career ==
Flory was drafted in the third round, 15th overall, by the Montreal Alouettes in the 1998 CFL draft. He returned to university for his final year of eligibility in 1998 and then joined the Alouettes in 1999. He won three Grey Cup championships and was twice named the CFL's Most Outstanding Offensive Lineman. He was also an 11-time East Division All-Star and nine-time CFL All-Star, which is second only to Willie Pless who was named a CFL All-Star 11 times. He announced his retirement on May 7, 2014. He was inducted into the Canadian Football Hall of Fame in 2018.

== Head coaching record ==
Year	Overall	Regular	Standing	Bowl/playoffs
Saskatchewan Huskies (CanWest) (2017–present)
2017	2–6	2–6	5th	
2018	7–4	5–3	3rd	W Hardy, L Mitchell
2019	6–4	5–3	2nd	L Hardy
2020	Season canceled due to COVID-19 pandemic			
2021	8–2	5–1	1st	W Hardy, W Uteck, L Vanier
2022	10–2	7–1	1st	W Hardy, W Uteck, L Vanier
2023	5–4	5–3	3rd	
2024	6–4	5–3	3rd	L Hardy
2025	10–2	7–1	1st	W Hardy, W Mitchell, L Vanier
Saskatchewan:	54–28	41–21		
Total:	54–28			
