= DeMarco–Becket Memorial Trophy =

Canadian Football League trophy

The DeMarco–Becket Memorial Trophy is a Canadian Football League trophy. It is awarded originally to the player selected as the outstanding lineman in the West Division.

The trophy was donated by the families of Mel Becket and Mario DeMarco, who were two prominent Saskatchewan Roughriders players who were victims of the Mount Slesse aircraft disaster on December 9, 1956.

Since 1974 this trophy has been awarded to the Most Outstanding Offensive Lineman in the West Division. Either the winner of this trophy or the winner of the Leo Dandurand Trophy will also receive the Canadian Football League Most Outstanding Offensive Lineman Award.

Prior to 1974 the CFL's Most Outstanding Lineman Award was awarded to both outstanding defensive players and outstanding linemen in the West Division, and this award was different from the DeMarco–Becket Memorial Trophy.

In 1995, during the American Expansion, this trophy was given to the North Division's Most Outstanding Lineman.

== DeMarco-Becket Memorial Trophy winners ==
- 2025 – Jermarcus Hardrick (OT), Saskatchewan Roughriders
- 2024 – Logan Ferland (OL), Saskatchewan Roughriders
- 2023 – Jermarcus Hardrick (OT), Winnipeg Blue Bombers
- 2022 – Stanley Bryant (OT), Winnipeg Blue Bombers
- 2021 – Stanley Bryant (OT), Winnipeg Blue Bombers
- 2020 – Season cancelled due to COVID-19
- 2019 – Stanley Bryant, (OT), Winnipeg Blue Bombers
- 2018 – Stanley Bryant, (OT), Winnipeg Blue Bombers
- 2017 – Stanley Bryant, (OT), Winnipeg Blue Bombers
- 2016 – Derek Dennis, (OT), Calgary Stampeders
- 2015 – Jovan Olafioye (OT), BC Lions
- 2014 – Brett Jones (C), Calgary Stampeders
- 2013 – Brendon LaBatte (OG), Saskatchewan Roughriders
- 2012 – Jovan Olafioye (OT), BC Lions
- 2011 – Jovan Olafioye (OT), BC Lions
- 2010 – Ben Archibald (OT), Calgary Stampeders
- 2009 – Ben Archibald (OT), Calgary Stampeders
- 2008 – Gene Makowsky (OT), Saskatchewan Roughriders
- 2007 – Rob Murphy (OG), BC Lions
- 2006 – Rob Murphy (OG), BC Lions
- 2005 – Gene Makowsky (OT), Saskatchewan Roughriders
- 2004 – Gene Makowsky (OT), Saskatchewan Roughriders
- 2003 – Andrew Greene (OG), Saskatchewan Roughriders
- 2002 – Bruce Beaton (OT), Edmonton Eskimos
- 2001 – Jay McNeil (OG), Calgary Stampeders
- 2000 – Andrew Greene (OG), Saskatchewan Roughriders
- 1999 – Jamie Taras (C), BC Lions
- 1998 – Fred Childress (OG), Calgary Stampeders
- 1997 – Fred Childress (OG), Calgary Stampeders
- 1996 – Rocco Romano (OG), Calgary Stampeders
- 1995 – Jamie Taras (OG), BC Lions
- 1994 – Rocco Romano (OG), Calgary Stampeders
- 1993 – Bruce Covernton (OT), Calgary Stampeders
- 1992 – Vic Stevenson (OT), Saskatchewan Roughriders
- 1991 – Jim Mills (OT), BC Lions
- 1990 – Jim Mills (OT), BC Lions
- 1989 – Rod Connop (C), Edmonton Eskimos
- 1988 – Roger Aldag (OG), Saskatchewan Roughriders
- 1987 – Bob Poley (C), Calgary Stampeders
- 1986 – Roger Aldag (OG), Saskatchewan Roughriders
- 1985 – Nick Bastaja (OT), Winnipeg Blue Bombers
- 1984 – John Bonk (C), Winnipeg Blue Bombers
- 1983 – John Bonk (C), Winnipeg Blue Bombers
- 1982 – Lloyd Fairbanks (OT), Calgary Stampeders
- 1981 – Larry Butler (OG), Winnipeg Blue Bombers
- 1980 – Mike Wilson (OT), Edmonton Eskimos
- 1979 – Mike Wilson (OT), Edmonton Eskimos
- 1978 – Al Wilson (C), BC Lions
- 1977 – Al Wilson (C), BC Lions
- 1976 – Al Wilson (C), BC Lions
- 1975 – Charlie Turner (OT), Edmonton Eskimos
- 1974 – Curtis Wester (OG), BC Lions
- 1973 – Ray Nettles (LB), BC Lions
- 1972 – John Helton (DT), Calgary Stampeders
- 1971 – Wayne Harris (LB), Calgary Stampeders
- 1970 – Greg Pipes (DT), Edmonton Eskimos
- 1969 – Ed McQuarters (DT), Saskatchewan Roughriders
- 1968 – Ed McQuarters (DT), Saskatchewan Roughriders
- 1967 – John LaGrone (DT), Edmonton Eskimos
- 1966 – Wayne Harris (LB), Calgary Stampeders
- 1965 – Dick Fouts (DE), BC Lions
- 1964 – Tom Brown (MG), BC Lions
- 1963 – Tom Brown (LB), BC Lions
- 1962 – Tom Brown (LB), BC Lions
- 1961 – Frank Rigney (OT), Winnipeg Blue Bombers
- 1960 – Frank Rigney (OT), Winnipeg Blue Bombers
- 1959 – Art Walker (DT), Edmonton Eskimos
- 1958 – Don Luzzi (DT), Calgary Stampeders
- 1957 – Art Walker (DE), Edmonton Eskimos

== CFL's Most Outstanding Lineman Award in the West Division prior to the 1974 ==
- 1973 – Ray Nettles (LB), British Columbia Lions
- 1972 – John Helton (DT), Calgary Stampeders
- 1971 – Wayne Harris (LB), Calgary Stampeders
- 1970 – Wayne Harris (LB), Calgary Stampeders
- 1969 – John LaGrone (DT), Edmonton Eskimos
- 1968 – Ted Urness (C), Saskatchewan Roughriders
- 1967 – Ed McQuarters (DT), Saskatchewan Roughriders
- 1966 – Wayne Harris (LB), Calgary Stampeders
- 1965 – Wayne Harris (LB), Calgary Stampeders
- 1964 – Tom Brown (LB), British Columbia Lions
- 1963 – Tom Brown (LB), British Columbia Lions
- 1962 – Wayne Harris (LB), Calgary Stampeders
- 1961 – Frank Rigney (OT), Winnipeg Blue Bombers
- 1960 – Herb Gray (DE), Winnipeg Blue Bombers
- 1959 – Roger Nelson (OT), Edmonton Eskimos
- 1958 – Don Luzzi (DT), Calgary Stampeders
- 1957 – Art Walker (OT/DG), Edmonton Eskimos
- 1956 – Buddy Alliston (LB/OG), Winnipeg Blue Bombers
- 1955 – Martin Ruby, Saskatchewan & Dale Meinert, Edmonton
