= David Hewson (disambiguation) =

David Hewson (born 1953) is a British author of crime and mystery novels.

David Hewson may also refer to:

- Dave Hewson (composer), British composer of scores for television and film
- David Hewson (Canadian football) (born 1982), Canadian football linebacker
