= Marc-Olivier =

Marc-Olivier is a masculine given name and may refer to:

- Marc-Olivier Brouillette (born 1986), Canadian football player
- Marc-Olivier Fogiel (born 1969), French television and radio host
- Marc-Olivier Vallerand (born 1989), Canadian ice hockey player
