= McQuarters =

McQuarters is a surname. Notable people with the surname include:

- Ed McQuarters (born 1943), American football player
- R. W. McQuarters (born 1976), American football player
