= CFL's Most Outstanding Offensive Lineman Award =

Sports award

The Most Outstanding Offensive Lineman Award is annually awarded to the best offensive lineman in the Canadian Football League. The two nominees for the award are the Leo Dandurand Trophy winner from the East Division, and the DeMarco-Becket Memorial Trophy winner from the West Division. Between the years of 1955 to 1973, both defensive players and offensive lineman had to compete for the CFL's Most Outstanding Lineman Award. By the 1974 season, the league decided to make two separate awards for both defensive players and offensive lineman.

== CFL's Most Outstanding Offensive Lineman Award winners ==
- 2025 – Jermarcus Hardrick (OT), Saskatchewan Roughriders
- 2024 – Ryan Hunter (OT/G), Toronto Argonauts
- 2023 – Dejon Allen (OT), Toronto Argonauts
- 2022 – Stanley Bryant (OT), Winnipeg Blue Bombers
- 2021 – Stanley Bryant (OT), Winnipeg Blue Bombers
- 2020 – season cancelled - COVID-19
- 2019 – Chris Van Zeyl (OT), Hamilton Tiger-Cats
- 2018 – Stanley Bryant (OT), Winnipeg Blue Bombers
- 2017 – Stanley Bryant (OT), Winnipeg Blue Bombers
- 2016 – Derek Dennis (OT), Calgary Stampeders
- 2015 – SirVincent Rogers (OT), Ottawa RedBlacks
- 2014 – Brett Jones (C), Calgary Stampeders
- 2013 – Brendon LaBatte (OG), Saskatchewan Roughriders
- 2012 – Jovan Olafioye (OT), BC Lions
- 2011 – Josh Bourke (OT), Montreal Alouettes
- 2010 – Ben Archibald (OT), Calgary Stampeders
- 2009 – Scott Flory (OG), Montreal Alouettes
- 2008 – Scott Flory (OG), Montreal Alouettes
- 2007 – Rob Murphy (OT), BC Lions
- 2006 – Rob Murphy (OT), BC Lions
- 2005 – Gene Makowsky (OT), Saskatchewan Roughriders
- 2004 – Gene Makowsky (OT), Saskatchewan Roughriders
- 2003 – Andrew Greene (OG), Saskatchewan Roughriders
- 2002 – Bryan Chiu (C), Montreal Alouettes
- 2001 – Dave Mudge (OT), Winnipeg Blue Bombers
- 2000 – Pierre Vercheval (OG), Montreal Alouettes
- 1999 – Uzooma Okeke (OT), Montreal Alouettes
- 1998 – Fred Childress (OG), Calgary Stampeders
- 1997 – Mike Kiselak (C), Toronto Argonauts
- 1996 – Mike Kiselak (C), Toronto Argonauts
- 1995 – Mike Withycombe (OG), Baltimore Stallions
- 1994 – Shar Pourdanesh (OT), Baltimore CFLers
- 1993 – Chris Walby (OT), Winnipeg Blue Bombers
- 1992 – Robert Smith (OT), Ottawa Rough Riders
- 1991 – Jim Mills (OT), BC Lions
- 1990 – Jim Mills (OT), BC Lions
- 1989 – Rod Connop (C), Edmonton Eskimos
- 1988 – Roger Aldag (OG), Saskatchewan Roughriders
- 1987 – Chris Walby (OT), Winnipeg Blue Bombers
- 1986 – Roger Aldag (OG), Saskatchewan Roughriders
- 1985 – Nick Bastaja (OT), Winnipeg Blue Bombers
- 1984 – John Bonk (C), Winnipeg Blue Bombers
- 1983 – Rudy Phillips (OG), Ottawa Rough Riders
- 1982 – Rudy Phillips (OG), Ottawa Rough Riders
- 1981 – Larry Butler (OG), Winnipeg Blue Bombers
- 1980 – Mike Wilson (OT), Edmonton Eskimos
- 1979 – Mike Wilson (OT), Edmonton Eskimos
- 1978 – Jim Coode (OT), Ottawa Rough Riders
- 1977 – Al Wilson (C), BC Lions
- 1976 – Dan Yochum (OT), Montreal Alouettes
- 1975 – Charlie Turner (OT), Edmonton Eskimos
- 1974 – Ed George (OG), Montreal Alouettes

== See also ==
- Leo Dandurand Trophy
- DeMarco-Becket Memorial Trophy
- CFL's Most Outstanding Lineman Award
