= Michael Wilson (offensive lineman) =

American football player (born 1947)

Mike Wilson
No. 67, 65, 62
- Positions: Tackle, Guard

Personal information
- Born: October 20, 1947 (age 79); Wilmington, Ohio, U.S.
- Listed height: 6 ft 3 in (1.91 m)
- Listed weight: 245 lb (111 kg)

Career information
- High school: Wilmington
- College: Dayton (1965-1968)
- NFL draft: 1969: 14th round, 343rd overall pick

Career history
- Cincinnati Bengals (1969-1970); Buffalo Bills (1971); Detroit Wheels (1974); Chicago Winds (1975); Philadelphia Bell (1975); Kansas City Chiefs (1975); Hamilton Tiger-Cats (1976–1978); Edmonton Eskimos (1979–1980); Los Angeles Express (1983); Washington Federals (1983)

Awards and highlights
- 2× Grey Cup champion (1979, 1980); 2× CFL Most Outstanding Offensive Lineman (1979, 1980); 2× DeMarco-Becket Memorial Trophy (1979, 1980); 2× CFL All-Star (1979, 1980); 2× CFL West All-Star (1979, 1980)

Career NFL/AFL statistics
- Games played: 26
- Games started: 15
- Fumble recoveries: 1
- Stats at Pro Football Reference

Michael DeForest Wilson (born October 20, 1947) is an American former professional football player who was a tackle for the Cincinnati Bengals, Buffalo Bills, and Kansas City Chiefs of the National Football League (NFL) from 1969 to 1975.

He later played with the Edmonton Eskimos of the Canadian Football League (CFL) from 1979 to 1980, where he was an All-Star and won the CFL's Most Outstanding Offensive Lineman Award both seasons. Wilson is the only player to have ever played in the American, the National, the World, the Canadian, and the United States Football League.

Wilson played college football for the Dayton Flyers as both an offensive tackle and fullback. He graduated from Dayton in 1970.

Wilson was selected 343rd overall in the 14th round of the 1969 NFL/AFL draft by the Cincinnati Bengals. After playing three games his rookie season, in 1970 he played in all 14 games, starting 12.

Wilson was inducted into the University of Dayton Athletic Hall of Fame in 1998. He was inducted into the Wilmington High School athletic hall of fame in 2009.
