= Miles Gorrell =

Canadian football player (born 1955)

- Gorrell with the Hamilton Tiger-Cats

Profile
- Position: Offensive lineman

Personal information
- Born: October 16, 1955 (age 71); Edmonton, Alberta, Canada
- Listed height: 6 ft 8 in (2.03 m)
- Listed weight: 285 lb (129 kg)

Career information
- University: Ottawa
- CFL draft: 1978

Career history
- 1978–1982: Calgary Stampeders
- 1982: Ottawa Rough Riders
- 1982–1985: Montreal Concordes
- 1985–1991: Hamilton Tiger-Cats
- 1992–1995: Winnipeg Blue Bombers
- 1996: Hamilton Tiger-Cats

Awards and highlights
- Grey Cup champion (1986); 2× Leo Dandurand Trophy (1986, 1989); CFL All-Star (1989); 4× CFL East All-Star (1984, 1986, 1988, 1989)
- Canadian Football Hall of Fame (Class of 2013)

Miles Gorrell (born October 16, 1955) is a former all star offensive lineman in the Canadian Football League (CFL). The five-time divisional All-Star and two-time Outstanding Lineman finalist sits sixth on the record books for games played (321) from 1978 to 1996 for the Calgary Stampeders, Ottawa Rough Riders, Montreal Concordes, Hamilton Tiger-Cats and Winnipeg Blue Bombers. He won one Grey Cup with Hamilton and played in two more with Winnipeg. He was a 5-time CFL Eastern Division All-Star and a 2-time CFL Outstanding Lineman finalist.

On February 21, 2013 the Canadian Football Hall of Fame announced that he would be in their class of inductees in September 2013.

Gorrell played football at Henry Wise Wood Senior High School in Calgary and went on to a 1975 Vanier Cup win during his playing years with the University of Ottawa. The Gee-Gees Miles Gorrell Award for Best Lineman is named in his honour.

From 2005-2010, Gorrell served as a Player Personnel Assistant & Director of Canadian Scouting with the Toronto Argonauts. He lived in Calgary with his wife Suzanne, and his daughters Veronica and Victoria until 2008. In the Summer of 2008, Gorrell and his family moved to Toronto, Ontario
