= Stanley Bryant =

American gridiron football player (born 1986)

- Bryant with the Winnipeg Blue Bombers in 2026

No. 66 – Winnipeg Blue Bombers
- Position: Offensive lineman
- Roster status: Active
- CFL status: American

Personal information
- Born: May 7, 1986 (age 40); Goldsboro, North Carolina, U.S.
- Listed height: 6 ft 4 in (1.93 m)
- Listed weight: 314 lb (142 kg)

Career information
- High school: Goldsboro
- College: East Carolina

Career history
- Denver Broncos (2009)*; Calgary Stampeders (2010–2014); Winnipeg Blue Bombers (2015–present)
- * Offseason or practice squad member only

Awards and highlights
- 3× Grey Cup champion (2014, 2019, 2021); 4× CFL's Most Outstanding Offensive Lineman Award (2017, 2018, 2021, 2022); 5× DeMarco–Becket Memorial Trophy (2017, 2018, 2019, 2021, 2022); 8× CFL All-Star (2013, 2014, 2017, 2018, 2019, 2021, 2022, 2024); 9× CFL West All-Star (2013, 2014, 2017, 2018, 2019, 2021, 2022, 2023, 2024)

Career CFL statistics as of Week 14, 2026
- Games played: 246
- Games started: 246
- Stats at CFL.ca

Stanley Myron Bryant (born May 7, 1986) is an American professional football offensive lineman for the Winnipeg Blue Bombers of the Canadian Football League (CFL). He played college football at Elizabeth City State University and East Carolina University. He has also been a member of the Denver Broncos and Calgary Stampeders.

== Early life ==
Bryant was a three-year football letterman at Goldsboro High School in Goldsboro, North Carolina. He was named the Mighty Cougars defensive player of the year in 2003.

== College career ==
Bryant played college football for the Elizabeth City State Vikings of Elizabeth City State University in 2005.

Bryant transferred to East Carolina University as a walk-on to play football for the East Carolina Pirates in 2006.

== Professional career ==
Pre-draft measurables
| Height | Weight |
|---|---|
| 6 ft 4 1/2 in (1.94 m) | 299 lb (136 kg) |
Values from Pro Day

=== Denver Broncos ===
Bryant was signed by the Denver Broncos on April 27, 2009 after going undrafted in the 2009 NFL draft. He was released by the Broncos on August 25, 2009.

=== Calgary Stampeders ===
Bryant was signed by the Calgary Stampeders on June 16, 2010. He made his CFL debut starting at right tackle on October 22, 2010 against the BC Lions. Bryant was a CFL All-Star and a CFL West All-Star in 2013 and 2014. He was the Stampeders' nominee for the CFL's Most Outstanding Offensive Lineman Award in 2011 and 2013.

=== Winnipeg Blue Bombers ===
Bryant was signed by the Winnipeg Blue Bombers on February 10, 2015. In his first two seasons in Winnipeg Bryant started in every game. On January 4, 2016, Bryant and the Bombers agreed to a contract extension. He signed a one-year contract extension with the team on January 5, 2021. On January 5, 2023, at age 36, Bryant and the Bombers agreed to another contract extension.
