= 2005 CFL draft =

Canadian football draft

General information
- Sport: Football
- Date: April 28
- Time: 11:30 AM EST

Overview
- 53 total selections
- First selection: Miguel Robede
- Most selections: Montreal Alouettes (9)
- Fewest selections: Edmonton Eskimos (3); Winnipeg Blue Bombers (3)

The 2005 CFL draft took place on Thursday, April 28, 2005 at 11:30 AM ET. 53 players were chosen from among eligible players from Canadian Universities across the country, as well as Canadian players playing in the NCAA. Of the 53 draft selections, 33 players were drafted from Canadian Interuniversity Sport institutions.

== Forfeitures ==
- Toronto forfeited their third round selection after selecting Riall Johnson in the 2004 Supplemental Draft.

== Round one ==
= CFL Division All-Star	= CFL All-Star	= Hall of Famer

Pick #	CFL team	Player	Position	School
1	Calgary Stampeders	Miguel Robede	DE	Laval
2	Ottawa Renegades	Cam Yeow	LB	Akron
3	Saskatchewan Roughriders (via Toronto via Winnipeg)	Matt O'Meara	OT	McMaster
4	Saskatchewan Roughriders	Chris Best	OL	Duke
5	Montreal Alouettes (via Ottawa via Edmonton)	Matthieu Proulx	DB	Laval
6	Hamilton Tiger-Cats	Jesse Lumsden	RB	McMaster
7	Saskatchewan Roughriders (via Montreal)	Nathan Hoffart	SB	Saskatchewan
8	BC Lions	Alexis Bwenge	RB	Kentucky
9	Toronto Argonauts	Nick Kaczur	OL	Toledo

== Round two ==
Pick #	CFL team	Player	Position	School
10	Calgary Stampeders	Godfrey Ellis	OL	Acadia
11	Toronto Argonauts (via Calgary via Ottawa)	Raymond Fontaine	LB	Kentucky
12	Montreal Alouettes (via Winnipeg)	Jeff Piercy	RB	Saskatchewan
13	Montreal Alouettes (via Saskatchewan)	Thomas Whitfield	DB	Syracuse
14	Toronto Argonauts (via Hamilton via Ottawa via Edmonton)	Phillipe Audet	DL	Laval
15	Hamilton Tiger-Cats	Fabio Filice	OL	McMaster
16	Montreal Alouettes	Philip Gauthier	DB	Laval
17	BC Lions	Pierre Tremblay	OL	Laval
18	Toronto Argonauts	Jeff Keeping	OT	Western Ontario

== Round three ==
Pick #	CFL team	Player	Position	School
19	Calgary Stampeders	John Comiskey	OT	Windsor
20	Ottawa Renegades	Les Mullings	RB	Saint Mary's
–	Toronto Argonauts (via Winnipeg)	Forfeit Pick		
21	Saskatchewan Roughriders	Matt Kudu	DL	Eastern Michigan
22	Edmonton Eskimos	Tim O'Neill	OL	Calgary
23	Hamilton Tiger-Cats	Francois Brochu	ST	Boston College
24	Montreal Alouettes	Victor Cabral	DT	Georgia Southern
25	BC Lions	David Lowry	LB	Calgary
26	BC Lions (via Toronto)	Patick Pierre-Louis	LB	UCLA

== Round Four ==
Pick #	CFL team	Player	Position	School
27	Calgary Stampeders	Kyler Jukes	OL	Regina
28	Ottawa Renegades	Cory Hathaway	TE/FB	Tulsa
29	Winnipeg Blue Bombers	Scott Mennie	LB	Manitoba
30	Saskatchewan Roughriders	J.O. Gagnon-Gordillo	DL	Eastern Michigan
31	Edmonton Eskimos	Anthony Posteraro	K/P	Graceland
32	Hamilton Tiger-Cats	Jeremy Steeves	S	St. Francis Xavier
33	Montreal Alouettes	Mike Ray	K/P	McMaster
34	BC Lions	Sebastian Clovis	DB	Saint Mary's
35	Toronto Argonauts	Tye Smith	OL	Manitoba

== Round Five ==
Pick #	CFL team	Player	Position	School
36	Calgary Stampeders	David Hewson	DB	Manitoba
37	Ottawa Renegades	Adrian Baird	DE	Ottawa
38	Winnipeg Blue Bombers	Martin Lapostolle	DL	Indiana
39	Saskatchewan Roughriders	Dustin Cherniawski	DB	British Columbia
40	Edmonton Eskimos	Robert Leblanc	SB	McGill
41	Hamilton Tiger-Cats	Iain Fleming	SB	Queen's
42	Montreal Alouettes	Curt Hundeby	OL	Saskatchewan
43	BC Lions	Nuvraj Bassi	DT	Oregon
44	Toronto Argonauts	Bryan Crawford	RB	Queen's

== Round Six ==
Pick #	CFL team	Player	Position	School
45	Calgary Stampeders	Brett Ralph	WR	Alberta
46	Ottawa Renegades	Lenard Semajuste	FB	Adams State
47	Winnipeg Blue Bombers	Ryan Bisson	OL	Northwood
48	Saskatchewan Roughriders	Ryan Gottselig	DL	Saskatchewan
49	Montreal Alouettes (via Edmonton)	Adam Eckert	WR	Dickinson State
50	Hamilton Tiger-Cats	Andrew Paopao	DL	San Jose State
51	Montreal Alouettes	Olivier Manigat	OL	Columbia
52	BC Lions	Karl Ortmanns	OL	Acadia
53	Toronto Argonauts	Ian Forde	RB	Waterloo
