= Jeff Keeping =

Former Canadian football player

No. 67
- Positions: Centre, Offensive lineman

Personal information
- Born: July 19, 1982 (age 44); Uxbridge, Ontario, Canada
- Listed height: 6 ft 5 in (1.96 m)
- Listed weight: 295 lb (134 kg)

Career information
- High school: Uxbridge
- University: Western Ontario
- CFL draft: 2005: 2nd round, 18th overall pick

Career history
- 2005–2007: Toronto Argonauts
- 2008: Montreal Alouettes
- 2009–2015: Toronto Argonauts
- 2016: Winnipeg Blue Bombers

Awards and highlights
- Grey Cup champion (2012); Leo Dandurand Trophy (2013); CFL All-Star (2013); CFL East All-Star (2013)
- Stats at CFL.ca

Jeff Keeping (born July 19, 1982) is a former professional offensive lineman/centre of the Canadian Football League (CFL). He was drafted by the Argonauts in the second round of the 2005 CFL draft. He played CIS football for the Western Ontario Mustangs. He also sits on the EMPWR Foundation board, aiding in concussion awareness and understanding. Jeff is also currently pursuing a career in Firefighting.

== Professional career ==
=== First stint with Argonauts ===
Keeping made his CFL debut with the Toronto Argonauts in 2005 where he played offensive lineman, defensive tackle, tight end and fullback.

=== Montreal Alouettes ===
On February 16, 2008, Keeping signed with the Montreal Alouettes. On December 11, 2008, Keeping was released, having never played a single game for the Alouettes due to a knee injury sustained during training camp.

=== Second stint with Argonauts ===
Keeping re-signed with the Toronto Argonauts on March 20, 2009. He would win a Grey Cup title with the Argonauts in 2012.

=== Winnipeg Blue Bombers ===
On February 9, 2016, Keeping signed with the Winnipeg Blue Bombers as a free agent. He suffered a knee injury in the first preseason game that year, and did not suit up for a regular season game. From 2016 to 2020, Keeping was the president of the Canadian Football League Players' Association.
