= Jermarcus Hardrick =

American gridiron football player (born 1990)

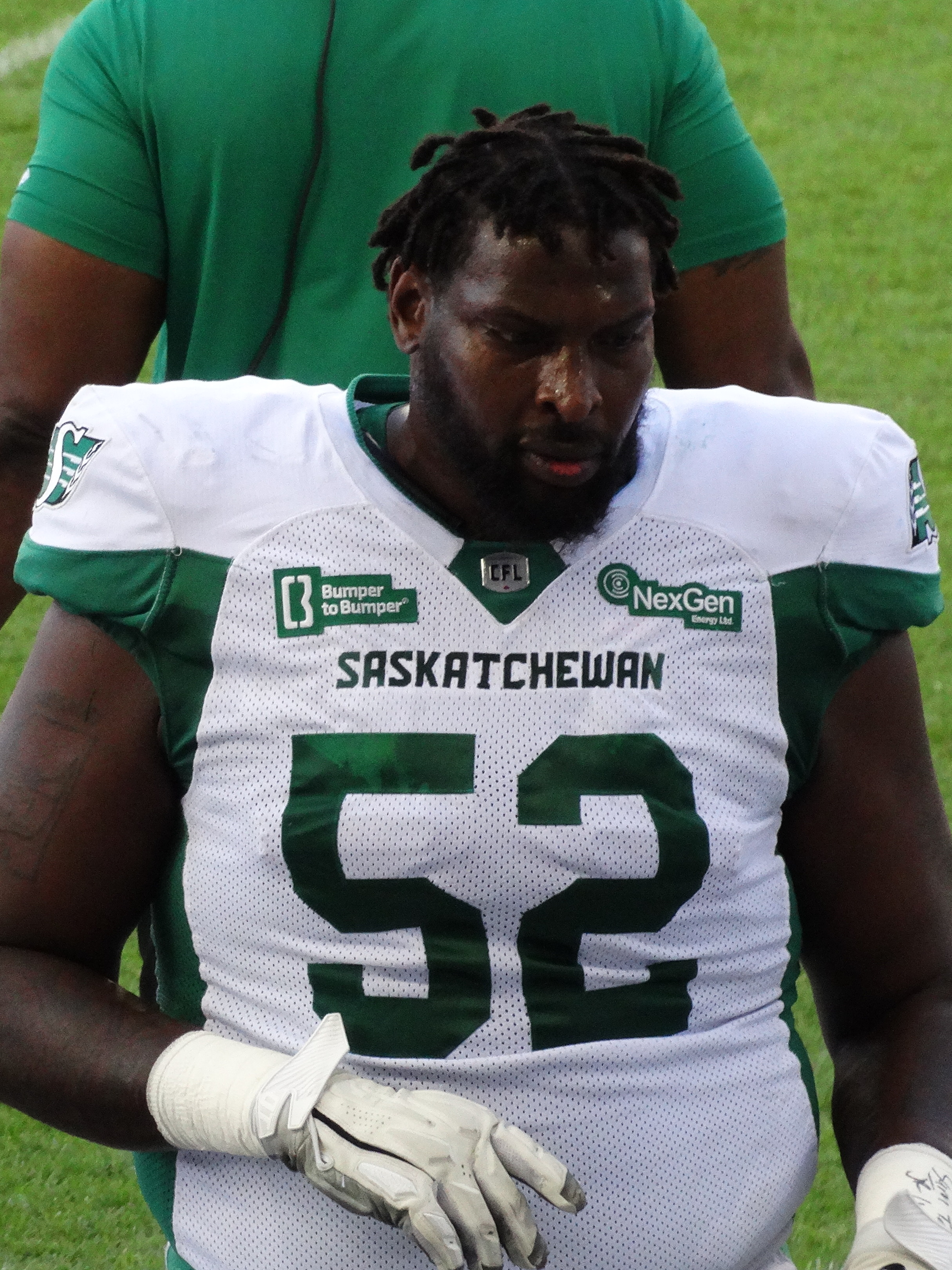
- Hardrick with the Saskatchewan Roughriders in 2025

No. 52 – Saskatchewan Roughriders
- Position: Offensive lineman
- Roster status: Active
- CFL status: American

Personal information
- Born: May 30, 1990 (age 36); Batesville, Mississippi, U.S.
- Listed height: 6 ft 4 in (1.93 m)
- Listed weight: 315 lb (143 kg)

Career information
- High school: South Panola
- College: Fort Scott; Nebraska

Career history
- 2012: Tampa Bay Buccaneers*
- 2012: New Orleans Saints*
- 2013: Utah Blaze
- 2014: BC Lions
- 2015: Tampa Bay Storm
- 2015: Saskatchewan Roughriders
- 2016–2023: Winnipeg Blue Bombers
- 2024–present: Saskatchewan Roughriders
- * Offseason or practice squad member only

Awards and highlights
- 3× Grey Cup champion (2019, 2021, 2025); CFL's Most Outstanding Offensive Lineman Award (2025); 3× CFL All-Star (2021, 2023, 2025); 5x CFL West All-Star (2017, 2021, 2023, 2025),2026; 2× DeMarco–Becket Memorial Trophy (2023, 2025)

Career CFL statistics as of 2025
- Games played: 155
- Games started: 153
- Stats at CFL.ca

Jermarcus "Yoshi" Hardrick (born May 30, 1990) is an American professional football offensive lineman for the Saskatchewan Roughriders of the Canadian Football League (CFL). He is a three time Grey Cup champion as a member of the 107th Grey Cup champions, the 108th Grey Cup champions, as well as the 112th Grey Cup champions and is a two-time West Division All-Star receiving the honour in 2017 and 2021. He played college football for the Fort Scott Greyhounds before joining the Nebraska Cornhuskers for two years to finish his college playing eligibility.

== Professional career ==
Pre-draft measurables
Height	Weight	40-yard dash	10-yard split	20-yard split	Vertical jump	Broad jump
6 ft 4 3/8 in (1.94 m)	320 lb (145 kg)	5.38 s	1.90 s	3.09 s	26.0 in (0.66 m)	8 ft 1 in (2.46 m)
All values from Pro Day

=== Tampa Bay Buccaneers ===
Hardrick was originally signed as an undrafted free agent with the Tampa Bay Buccaneers on May 7, 2012. He played in three preseason games, but was released with the final cuts on August 31, 2012.

=== New Orleans Saints ===
Hardrick later signed a practice roster agreement on November 21, 2012, with the New Orleans Saints and was not re-signed during the following off-season.

=== Utah Blaze ===
Hardrick then spent one season in the Arena Football League (AFL), playing for the Utah Blaze.

=== BC Lions ===
Hardrick signed a practice roster agreement with the BC Lions on July 15, 2014, and played in his first CFL game on July 19, 2014, against the Montreal Alouettes. The following week, he made his first career start on July 25, 2014, in a game against the Winnipeg Blue Bombers. During the 2014 season, he played in 12 games for the Lions and started in 10 of them. He was released by the Lions on April 29, 2015.

=== Tampa Bay Storm ===
After being released, Hardrick returned to the AFL with the Tampa Bay Storm, joining them on June 5, 2015, but stayed with the team for only two games. On June 18, 2015, it was announced that Hardrick had signed with the Saskatchewan Roughriders just prior to the team's second preseason game.

=== Saskatchewan Roughriders (first stint) ===
Hardrick was released shortly after, but was signed to the team's practice roster on August 20, 2015. He was promoted to the active roster for the September 6, 2015 game against the Blue Bombers where the Roughriders earned their first win of a difficult season. He dressed and started in eight games to end the 2015 season. He was released by the Roughriders on February 16, 2016.

=== Winnipeg Blue Bombers ===
One day after his release from the Roughriders, Hardrick signed with the Winnipeg Blue Bombers on February 17, 2016. For the 2016 season, he played and started in 16 regular season games as the Blue Bombers qualified for the playoffs for the first time since 2011. He also started a trend for home games at IG Field when the lineman, weighing 314 pounds (142 kg), jumped into the stands following a touchdown. The crowd celebration would become known as the "Hardrick Hop" or "Hardrick Leap".

In 2017, Hardrick started all 18 regular season games at right tackle and was named a CFL West All-star. He signed a one-year contract extension at the end of the season on November 16, 2017. For the 2018 season, he missed three games due to injury, but started in the other 15 regular season games. He started in both of the Blue Bomber's playoff games, as Winnipeg lost the West Final to the Calgary Stampeders. He signed a one-year extension on November 28, 2018.

The 2019 Winnipeg Blue Bombers season saw Hardrick start at right tackle for all 18 regular season games as the team led the league in rushing yards. He also started in all three of the Blue Bombers' post-season games and he won his first Grey Cup championship in 107th Grey Cup victory over the Hamilton Tiger-Cats.

In the following off-season, Hardrick signed a one-year extension on December 14, 2019, to play with the team for the 2020 season. However, the 2020 CFL season was cancelled, so he signed another one-year extension on December 30, 2020. Hardrick again anchored the right side of the line as Winnipeg went on to led the CFL in wins during the regular season. They would defeat Saskatchewan in the semi-finals to go to a Grey Cup rematch with Hamilton. In the 2021 Grey Cup the Bombers trailed 22-10 but Hardrick helped build a clean pocket as the Bombers would come back to win 33-25 in overtime for their second Grey Cup championship in a row. For his great play throughout the season, Hardrick was named a CFL All-Star and CFL West All-Star for the first time in his career.

Hardrick then signed a one-year contract extension at $150,000 for the year to stay in Winnipeg for the 2022 CFL season.

Hardrick became a free agent upon the expiry of his contract on February 13, 2024.

=== Saskatchewan Roughriders (second stint) ===
On February 5, 2024, during the CFL's Free Agency communication window, it was reported that once the free agent market officially opens on February 13, Hardrick would be signing a two-year contract with the Saskatchewan Roughriders. On February 13, the Roughriders confirmed that Hardrick had signed a two-year contract with the team.

== Personal life ==
Hardrick was born and grew up in the small town of Courtland, Mississippi, population 350. The town was very small and did not have a lot of opportunity for its residents, the town had no paved roads, aside from the highway, and most residents lived in trailers. His birth father went to prison when Hardrick was three, he had fathered 17 children in Courtland with different women, and was rarely seen in his life. Hardrick's best friend growing up was a boy named Mario Lewis; because the two were always together, people began calling Hardrick "Yoshi", a reference to the characters Mario and Yoshi from the Mario franchise of video games. The two would later find out they were half-brothers. He met his wife Samantha at the University of Nebraska–Lincoln, where she was competing as a track athlete, and together they have three children, living at their home in Lincoln during the off-season.
