= Tim O'Neill (Canadian football) =

Canadian football player (born 1979)

No. 66
- Position: Centre

Personal information
- Born: October 17, 1979 (age 47); Victoria, British Columbia, Canada
- Listed height: 6 ft 3 in (1.91 m)
- Listed weight: 305 lb (138 kg)

Career information
- High school: Belmont
- University: Calgary
- CFL draft: 2005: 3rd round, 22nd overall pick

Career history
- 2006: Edmonton Eskimos*
- 2008–2011: Calgary Stampeders
- 2012–2015: Hamilton Tiger-Cats
- 2016: BC Lions
- * Offseason or practice squad member only

Awards and highlights
- Grey Cup champion (2008)
- Stats at CFL.ca

Tim O'Neill (born October 17, 1979) is a Canadian former professional football offensive lineman who played in the Canadian Football League (CFL). He was drafted by the Edmonton Eskimos in the third round of the 2005 CFL draft. He played CIS Football for the Calgary Dinos.

On February 10, 2017, at age 37, O'Neill informed the BC Lions of his intention to retire.
