= Kyler Jukes =

Canadian football player (born 1979)

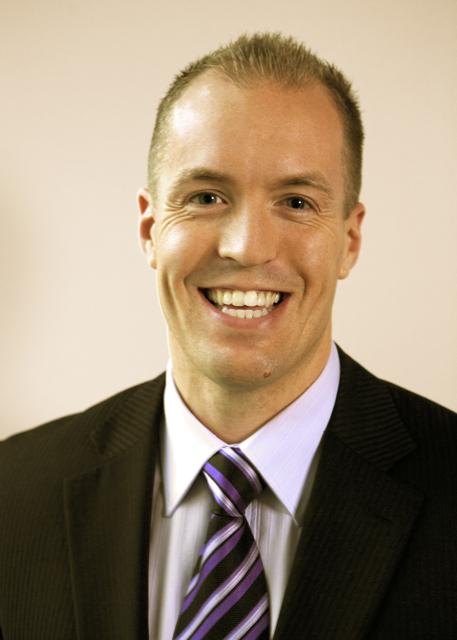

No. 63
- Position: Centre

Personal information
- Born: April 9, 1979 (age 47); Ganges, British Columbia, Canada
- Listed height: 6 ft 4 in (1.93 m)
- Listed weight: 309 lb (140 kg)

Career information
- College: Regina
- CFL draft: 2005: 4th round, 27th overall pick

Career history
- 2005: Calgary Stampeders
- 2006: Toronto Argonauts
- 2006–2008: Hamilton Tiger-Cats

Kyler Jukes (born April 9, 1979) is a former professional football player in the Canadian Football League (CFL).

== Football career ==
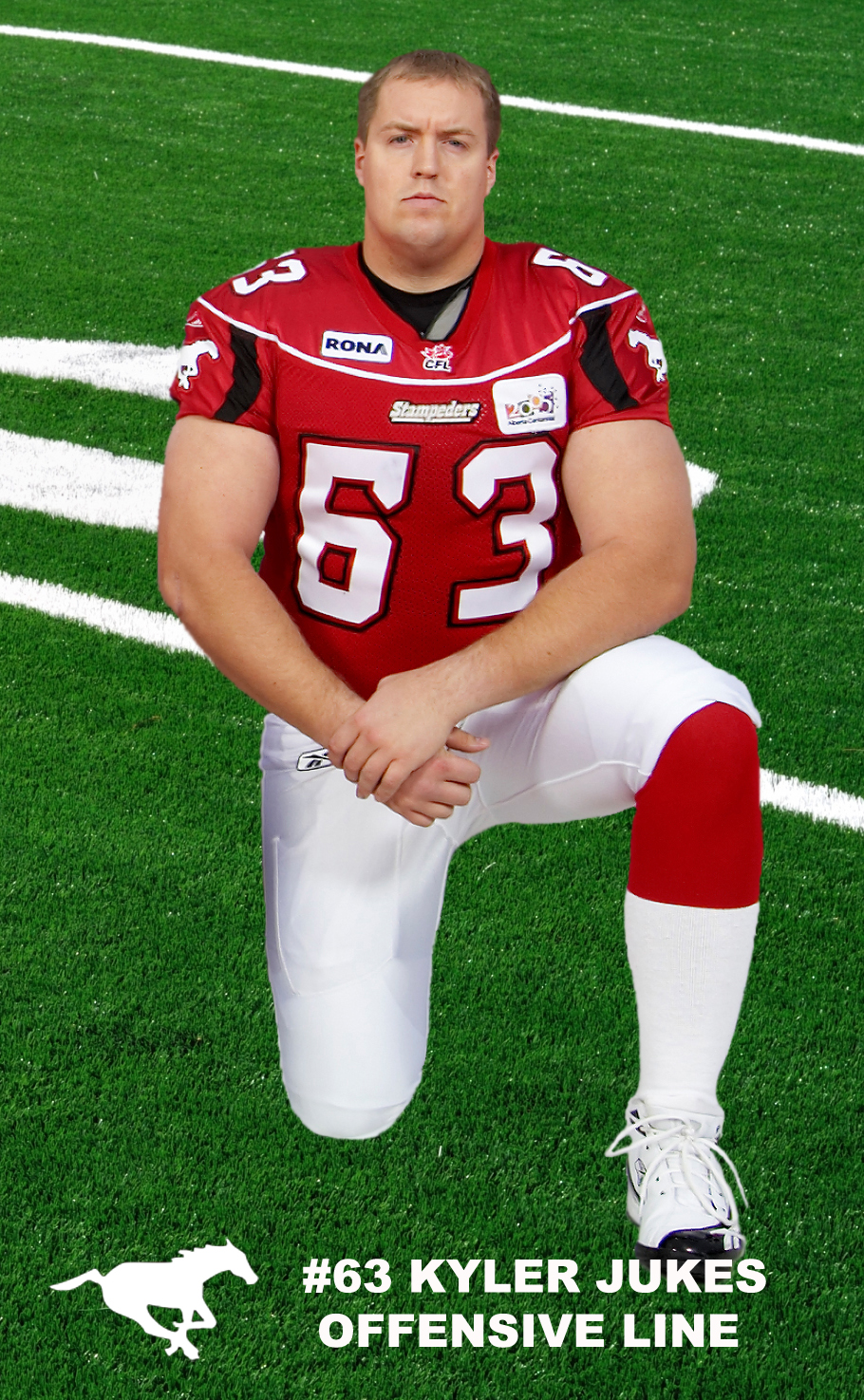

=== Junior football ===
Jukes played three seasons (1998–2000) as a defensive lineman with the Okanagan Sun Football Club of the Canadian Junior Football League (CJFL) winning a National Championship in 2000. During his rookie year, Jukes played defensive end, starting the last half of the season including 1998 CJFL National Championship, which the Okanagan Sun lost to the Regina Rams, 36–13. During the 1999 season, Jukes moved to defensive tackle starting all 10 regular season games, playoffs, and the 1999 CJFL National Championship, which the Okanagan Sun lost to the Windsor AKO Fratmen, 32–29. During the Okanagan Sun's 2000 national championship season, Jukes played on the defensive line culminating in being named the most outstanding defensive lineman and a conference all-star.

=== College football ===
Played four seasons (2001–2004) with the University of Regina Rams. Spent the first three seasons of his college playing career as a dominant defensive player. Twice named most outstanding defensive lineman. In 2004, made the switch from the defensive to offensive line to improve his chances of being selected in the 2005 CFL Canadian College Draft.

=== Professional football ===
Kyler Jukes is a former Canadian Football League (CFL) offensive lineman who is now retired. Selected in the fourth round, 27th overall in 2005 CFL draft by the Calgary Stampeders Football Club, Jukes officially signed with the club on May 26 and subsequently reported to training camp. He spent the entire 2005 season as a backup offensive lineman with the football club. Following the 2006 Stampeders training camp, Jukes was a final cut. He then signed as a free agent with the Toronto Argonauts, making his debut in the Argonauts 40-6 Labour Day Classic victory over the Hamilton Tiger-Cats at Ivor Wynne Stadium during which quarterback, Damon Allen, broke the CFL all-time passing record for most yardage thrown in a career. Jukes was then traded to the Hamilton Tiger-Cats football club on September 12, 2006. He made his Tiger-Cats debut in Hamilton's 20–18 victory over the Edmonton Eskimos at Commonwealth Stadium in Edmonton on September 22, 2006. On January 3, 2007, Jukes signed a 2-year contract extension with the Hamilton club where he played until retiring prior to the start of the 2009 training camp.
