= Lindsey Lamar =

American football player and coach (born 1990)

Pittsburgh Panthers
- Title: Running backs coach

Personal information
- Born: September 19, 1990 (age 36); Tampa, Florida, U.S.
- Listed height: 5 ft 9 in (1.75 m)
- Listed weight: 180 lb (82 kg)

Career information
- Position: Running back (No. 39)
- High school: Hillsborough (Tampa)
- College: South Florida (2009–2012)
- NFL draft: 2013: undrafted

Career history

Playing
- Hamilton Tiger-Cats (2013–2014)

Coaching
- South Florida (2015–2016) Graduate assistant; South Florida (2017–2018) Special assistant to the head coach; South Florida (2019) Offensive quality control coach; Howard (2020–2022) Wide receivers coach; Howard (2023) Offensive coordinator & wide receivers coach; Pittsburgh (2024–present) Running backs coach

Awards and highlights
- First-team All-Big East (2010); Big East Special Teams Player of the Year (2010)

Lindsey Lamar (born September 19, 1990) is an American college football coach and former running back. He is the running backs coach for the University of Pittsburgh, a position he has held since 2024. He played college football at the University of South Florida. He played for the Hamilton Tiger-Cats of the Canadian Football League (CFL).

== Early and college ==
Lamar attended Hillsborough High School in Tampa, Florida.

Lamar played for the South Florida Bulls from 2009 to 2012. He earned first-team All-Big East and Big East Special Teams Player of the Year honors in 2010.

== Professional career ==
Pre-draft measurables
Height	Weight	40-yard dash	10-yard split	20-yard split	20-yard shuttle	Three-cone drill	Vertical jump	Broad jump	Bench press
5 ft 8 in (1.73 m)	180 lb (82 kg)	4.51 s	1.56 s	2.54 s	4.42 s	7.32 s	30 in (0.76 m)	9 ft 4 in (2.84 m)	11 reps
All values from South Florida Pro Day

Lamar was signed by the Hamilton Tiger-Cats on May 29, 2013. Lamar had a 104-yard kick return touchdown in his CFL debut on June 28, 2013, against the Toronto Argonauts. He was named Special Teams Player of the Week for Week One of the 2013 CFL season.

He was released by the Tiger-Cats on September 10, 2014.

== Coaching career ==
In 2015, Lamar joined South Florida as a graduate assistant. In 2017, he was promoted to the special assistant to the head coach. In 2019, he became an offensive quality control coach.

In 2020, Lamar was hired as the wide receivers coach for Howard. In 2023, he was promoted to offensive coordinator.

In 2024, Lamar was hired as the running backs coach for Pittsburgh.

== Personal life ==
Lamar's cousin, Nigel Harris, also played college football at South Florida.
