= Dejon Allen =

American gridiron football player (born 1994)

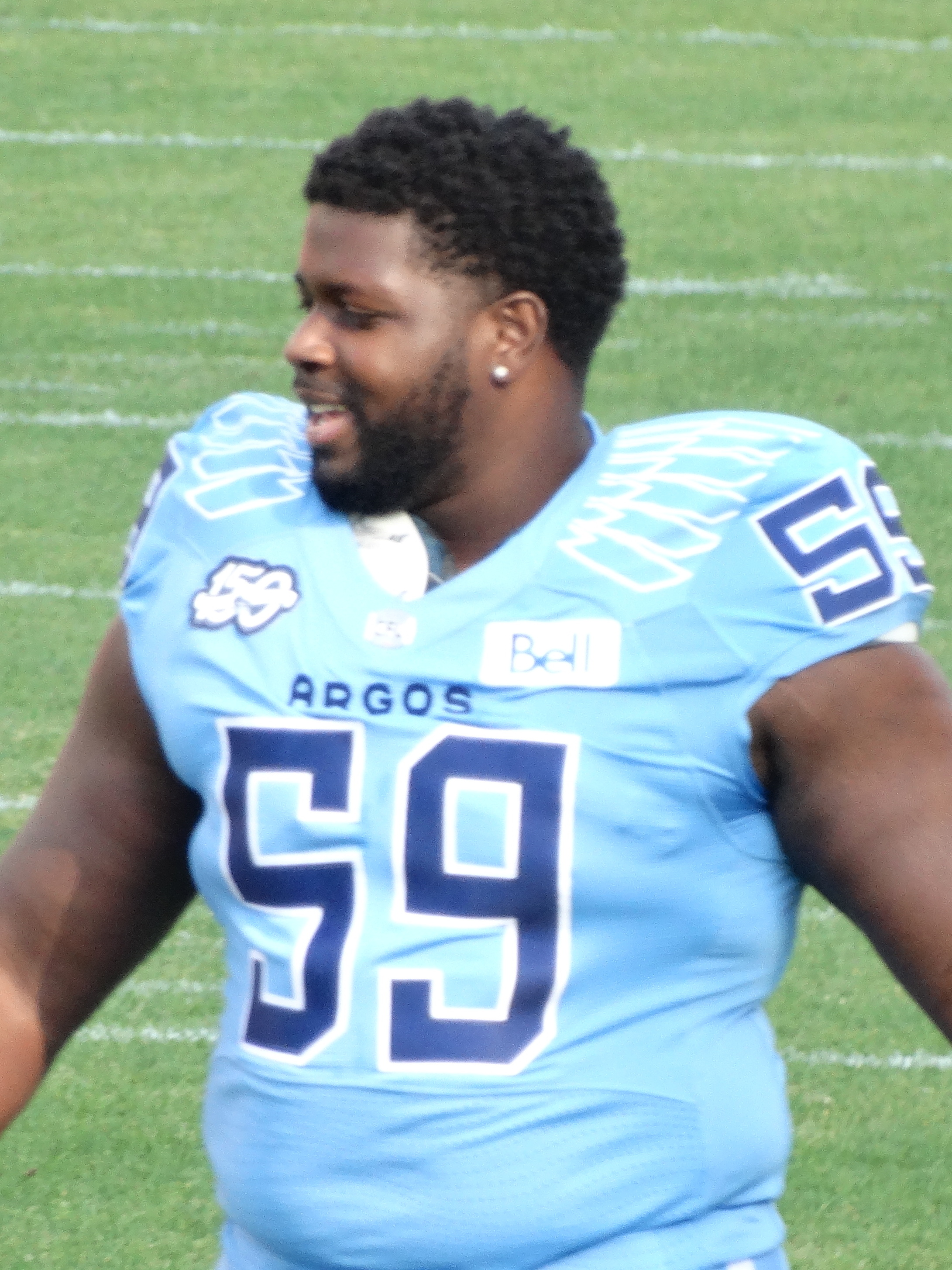
- Allen with the Toronto Argonauts in 2023

Profile
- Position: Offensive tackle

Personal information
- Born: May 5, 1994 (age 32); Compton, California, U.S.
- Listed height: 6 ft 2 in (1.88 m)
- Listed weight: 300 lb (136 kg)

Career information
- High school: Manuel Dominguez (CA)
- College: Hawaii
- NFL draft: 2018: undrafted

Career history
- Chicago Bears (2018)*; Green Bay Packers (2019)*; St. Louis BattleHawks (2020); New York Guardians (2020); Toronto Argonauts (2021–2024); BC Lions (2025–2026)
- * Offseason or practice squad member only

Awards and highlights
- 2× Grey Cup champion (2022, 2024); CFL's Most Outstanding Offensive Lineman Award (2023); Leo Dandurand Trophy (2023); 2× CFL All-Star/All-CFL (2023, 2024); 3× CFL East All-Star (2022, 2023, 2024); First-team All-Mountain West (2017); Second-team All-Mountain West (2016)

Career CFL statistics as of 2025
- Games played: 68
- Stats at CFL.ca
- Stats at Pro Football Reference

Dejon Allen (born May 5, 1994) is an American professional football offensive tackle. He most recently played for the BC Lions of the Canadian Football League (CFL). He is a two-time Grey Cup champion after winning with the Toronto Argonauts in 2022 and 2024. He played college football at University of Hawaii.

== College career ==
In 2017, during Allen's senior year with the Warriors, he was named to the All-Mountain West first team. He also earned All-Conference recognition for the third straight year and was named his team's Coach June Jones Offensive MVP for the second straight year. During this season, Allen started 11 of 12 games at left tackle, scored the highest offensive grade (92.8 percent) on the line, did not allow a single sack in drop-back pass situations, and helped UH achieve its best rushing average (168.2) in 22 years.

Allen missed his only game of the season when the Warriors played Colorado State on September 30, ending a streak of 42 straight starts dating back to his redshirt freshman season. Allen finished with 49 starts in 50 games played during his four-year career.

Based around his performance in the previous season, Allen was named to the All-Mountain West second team as well as was named the Coach June Jones Offensive MVP. Allen started all 14 games in 2015 at left tackle after making an off-season switch from guard. He graded out 90 percent or above in all 14 games. Allen did not give up a single sack all season during drop-back pass plays.

== Professional career ==
Pre-draft measurables
Height	Weight	Arm length	Hand span	Wingspan	40-yard dash	10-yard split	20-yard split	20-yard shuttle	Three-cone drill	Vertical jump	Broad jump	Bench press
6 ft 2 in (1.88 m)	295 lb (134 kg)	32 5/8 in (0.83 m)	9 1/4 in (0.23 m)	6 ft 9 1/4 in (2.06 m)	4.97 s	1.77 s	2.93 s	4.82 s	7.63 s	30.5 in (0.77 m)	9 ft 1 in (2.77 m)	29 reps
All values from Pro Day

=== Chicago Bears ===
Allen signed with the Chicago Bears as an undrafted free agent on May 1, 2018. He spent the season with the Chicago Bears before being released on May 3, 2019.

=== Green Bay Packers ===
Allen signed with the Green Bay Packers on August 29, 2019. He was released during roster cuts on September 1, 2019.

=== St. Louis Battlehawks ===
Allen was selected by the St. Louis BattleHawks in phase two of the 2020 XFL draft.

=== New York Guardians ===
Allen was traded to the New York Guardians on January 17, 2020, for David Rivers and Brian Wallace.

=== Toronto Argonauts ===
Allen signed with the Toronto Argonauts on December 28, 2020. He played in 63 games over four seasons or the Argonauts where he was named to the All-CFL team twice and won the CFL's Most Outstanding Offensive Lineman Award in 2023. He also won two Grey Cup championships in 2022 and 2024.

=== BC Lions ===
On January 6, 2025, Allen was traded to the BC Lions in exchange for Ryder Varga and a second-round pick in the 2026 CFL draft. On June 26, 2025, Allen was placed on the Lions' 6-game injured list. He rejoined the active roster on October 16, 2025, and finished the 2025 season having played in just five games. On October 31, 2025, Allen was placed on the Lions' 1-game injured list, in advance of the Western Semifinal game of the 2025 playoffs and where remained for the rest of the 2025 postseason. On January 29, 2026, Allen re-signed with the Lions, on a two-year contract extension. He started the first five games at right tackle in 2026, but after a 1–4 start for the team, Allen was released on July 23, 2026.
