= Nigel Harris (gridiron football) =

American football player (born 1994)

No. 58, 53, 52, 57
- Position: Linebacker

Personal information
- Born: December 7, 1994 (age 31); Gainesville, Florida, U.S.
- Listed height: 6 ft 2 in (1.88 m)
- Listed weight: 230 lb (104 kg)

Career information
- High school: Hillsborough (Tampa, Florida)
- College: South Florida (2013–2016)
- NFL draft: 2017: undrafted

Career history
- Los Angeles Chargers (2017); New York Giants (2017); Tampa Bay Buccaneers (2017); Arizona Cardinals (2018)*; Tennessee Titans (2018–2019); Saskatchewan Roughriders (2021–2022); San Antonio Brahmas (2024)*
- * Offseason or practice squad member only

Career NFL statistics
- Total tackles: 12
- Stats at Pro Football Reference

Nigel Harris (born December 7, 1994) is an American former professional football linebacker. He played college football at South Florida, and signed with the Los Angeles Chargers as an undrafted free agent in 2017.

== Early life ==
Harris played high school football at Hillsborough High School in Tampa, Florida, and was a three-year starter. He recorded 95 tackles, 1 interception and 1 fumble recovery his sophomore year in 2010, earning Second-team All-Hillsborough honors. The helped the team to a 10–3 record and an appearance in the regional semifinals in 2010. Harris recorded 89 tackles, 1 sack, 1 pass breakups and 2 fumble recoveries his junior year in 2011, garnering Second-team All-Hillsborough recognition. He also punted 34 times and averaged 37.2 yards per punt. He helped the team to an 11–1 record and an appearance in the regional semifinals in 2011. Harris recorded 117 tackles, 2 sacks, 3 pass breakups, 726 rushing yards and 15 rushing touchdowns his senior season in 2012, earning Associated Press First-team 6A All-State, First-team All-Hillsborough and Honorable Mention All-Suncoast honors. He also punted 28 times and averaged 36 yards per punt. He helped the team to a 9–2 record and an appearance in the regional semifinals. Harris recorded 301 tackles, 3 sacks, 1 interception, 4 pass breakups and 3 fumble recoveries from 2010 to 2012. The team also had a 30–6 during that span.

== College career ==
Harris played for the South Florida Bulls of the University of South Florida from 2013 to 2016. He played in all 12 games, starting 7, in 2013, recording 18 solo tackles, 17 tackle assists, 1 pass breakup and 1 forced fumble. He played in 11 games, all starts at inside linebacker, in 2014, recording 52 solo tackles, 25 tackle assists, 2 sacks, 1 pass breakup, 6 forced fumbles and 2 fumble recoveries. Harris led the FBS with 0.55 forced fumbles per game while his six forced fumbles set the school single-season record. He played in 11 games, starting 10, in 2015, recording 29 solo tackles, 13 tackles assists, 1.5 sacks, 1 interception and 1 forced fumble. In August 2016, he was named to the 2015–16 American Athletic Conference All-Academic Team. He played the "Stinger" linebacker position in 2015. Harris played in all 13 games, all starts at "Will" linebacker, in 2016, recording 48 solo tackles, 30 tackle assists, 2 sacks, 2 interceptions, 1 pass breakup and 1 fumble recovery. He played in 47 games, starting 41, during his college career, recording 147 solo tackles, 85 tackle assists, 5.5 sacks, 3 interceptions, 3 pass breakups, 8 forced fumbles and 3 fumble recoveries. His eight career forced fumbles ranked second all-time in school history.

== Professional career ==
=== Pre-draft ===
Harris was rated the 70th best outside linebacker in the 2017 NFL draft by NFLDraftScout.com.

Pre-draft measurables
| Height | Weight | 40-yard dash | 10-yard split | 20-yard split | 20-yard shuttle | Three-cone drill | Vertical jump | Broad jump | Bench press |
|---|---|---|---|---|---|---|---|---|---|
| 6 ft 1 in (1.85 m) | 220 lb (100 kg) | 4.57 s | 1.61 s | 2.59 s | 4.52 s | 7.45 s | 36 in (0.91 m) | 9 ft 6 in (2.90 m) | 15 reps |
All values from South Florida Pro Day

=== Los Angeles Chargers ===
After going undrafted, Harris signed with the Los Angeles Chargers on May 12, 2017. He played in five games, starting 1, in 2017, recording eight solo tackles and three tackle assists. He was waived on October 16, 2017.

=== New York Giants ===
On October 17, 2017, Harris was claimed off waivers by the New York Giants. On November 7, 2017, he was placed on injured reserve with a ribs injury. He was waived with an injury settlement on December 6, 2017.

=== Tampa Bay Buccaneers ===
On December 13, 2017, Harris was signed to the Tampa Bay Buccaneers' practice squad. He was promoted to the active roster on December 20, 2017.

On September 1, 2018, Harris was waived by the Buccaneers.

=== Arizona Cardinals ===
On September 18, 2018, Harris was signed to the Arizona Cardinals' practice squad. He was released on October 2, 2018.

=== Tennessee Titans ===
On October 9, 2018, Harris was signed to the Tennessee Titans practice squad. He was promoted to the active roster on December 20, 2018.

On August 19, 2019, Harris was waived/injured by the Titans and placed on injured reserve. He was waived from injured reserve with an injury settlement on August 23. He was re-signed to the practice squad on October 15. He was promoted to the active roster on December 18, 2019. He was waived on December 23 and re-signed to the practice squad. He signed a reserve/future contract with the Titans on January 20, 2020. He was waived on July 26, 2020.

=== Saskatchewan Roughriders ===
Harris signed with the Saskatchewan Roughriders of the CFL on April 12, 2021. On February 14, 2023, Harris became a free agent.

=== San Antonio Brahmas ===
On October 19, 2023, Harris signed with San Antonio Brahmas of the XFL. He was removed from the roster on February 15, 2024.

== Personal life ==
Harris' brother, Brandon, and cousin, Lindsey Lamar, both played college football at South Florida.
