= Ryan Hunter =

Canadian gridiron football player (born 1995)

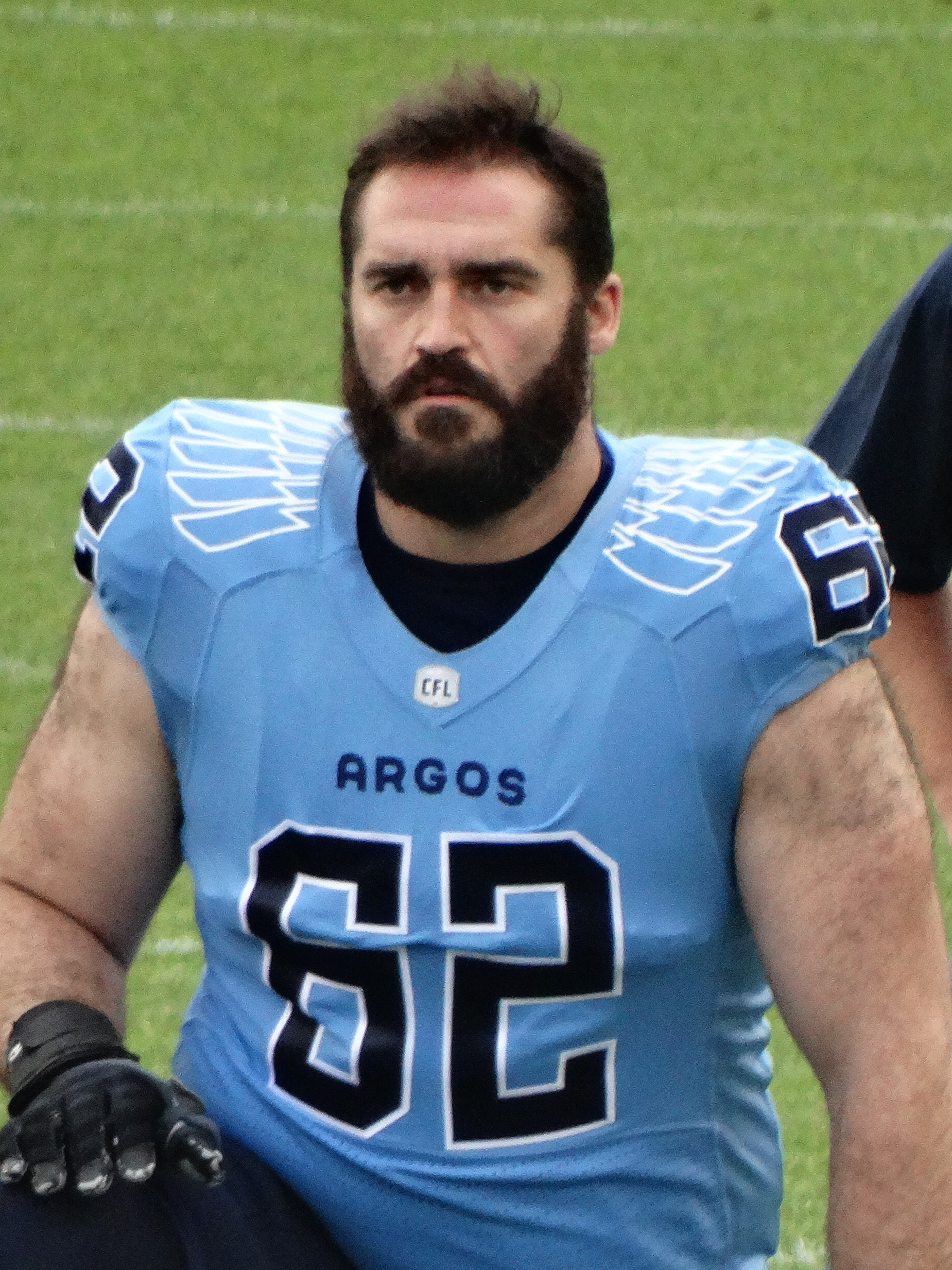
- Hunter with the Toronto Argonauts in 2024

No. 62 – Toronto Argonauts
- Position: Offensive lineman
- Roster status: Active
- CFL status: National

Personal information
- Born: April 1, 1995 (age 31); North Bay, Ontario, Canada
- Listed height: 6 ft 4 in (1.93 m)
- Listed weight: 324 lb (147 kg)

Career information
- High school: Canisius (Buffalo, New York, U.S.)
- College: Bowling Green
- NFL draft: 2018: undrafted
- CFL draft: 2018: 1st round, 9th overall pick

Career history
- Kansas City Chiefs (2018–2019); Los Angeles Chargers (2020–2022)*; Toronto Argonauts (2022–present)
- * Offseason or practice squad member only

Awards and highlights
- Super Bowl champion (LIV); 2× Grey Cup champion (2022, 2024); CFL's Most Outstanding Offensive Lineman Award (2024); Leo Dandurand Trophy (2024); 2× CFL All-Star (2023, 2024); 2× CFL East All-Star (2023, 2024)

Career NFL statistics
- Games played: 3
- Games started: 0
- Stats at Pro Football Reference

Career CFL statistics as of 2025
- Games played: 52
- Games started: 48
- Stats at CFL.ca

Ryan Kenneth Hunter (born April 1, 1995) is a Canadian professional football offensive lineman for the Toronto Argonauts of the Canadian Football League (CFL). He has also been a member of the Kansas City Chiefs and Los Angeles Chargers of the National Football League (NFL).

== Early life ==
Hunter is from North Bay, Ontario. He moved to Buffalo, New York, during high school. He attended Canisius High School, and played for the school's football team. He was named the best offensive lineman in Western New York, and shared 2012 The Buffalo News Player of the Year Award with teammate Qadree Ollison.

== College career ==
Hunter then attended Bowling Green State University, and played college football for the Bowling Green Falcons. He took a redshirt in his first year, and then played in 52 games for his next four years. He started all 12 games of his junior year at right tackle, and all 12 games in his senior year at left tackle.

== Professional career ==
Pre-draft measurables
Height	Weight	Arm length	Hand span	Wingspan	40-yard dash	10-yard split	20-yard split	20-yard shuttle	Three-cone drill	Vertical jump	Broad jump	Bench press
6 ft 3 7/8 in (1.93 m)	316 lb (143 kg)	31 3/4 in (0.81 m)	9 3/4 in (0.25 m)	6 ft 6 in (1.98 m)	5.29 s	1.78 s	3.01 s	4.66 s	7.47 s	27.5 in (0.70 m)	8 ft 8 in (2.64 m)	25 reps
All values from Pro Day

After not getting selected in the 2018 NFL draft, Hunter was drafted by Toronto Argonauts as the final pick (9th overall) of the first round of 2018 CFL draft but did not sign a contract with the team.

=== Kansas City Chiefs ===
Instead, Hunter signed with the Kansas City Chiefs as an undrafted free agent. Hunter spent the 2018 season on the Chiefs' practice squad. He was promoted to the active roster in 2019. After a loss, the Chiefs released Hunter, but they re-signed him to the practice squad. He was again promoted to the active roster, and was on the active roster for Super Bowl LIV in which the Chiefs beat the San Francisco 49ers 31–20. He was waived during final roster cuts on September 5, 2020.

=== Los Angeles Chargers ===
On October 1, 2020, Hunter was signed to the Los Angeles Chargers practice squad. He signed a reserve/future contract with the Chargers on January 5, 2021.

On August 31, 2021, Hunter was waived by the Chargers and re-signed to the practice squad the next day. He signed a reserve/future contract with the Chargers on January 11, 2022.

On August 30, 2022, Hunter was waived by the Chargers.

=== Toronto Argonauts ===
On September 23, 2022, it was announced that Hunter had signed with the Toronto Argonauts. He played in five regular season games in 2022 and started in two. He also started in both of the team's post-season games that year, including his first Grey Cup game, where the Argonauts defeated the Winnipeg Blue Bombers in the 109th Grey Cup game.

In 2023, Hunter played and started in 18 regular season games and also started in the team's East Final loss to the Montreal Alouettes. In the 2024 season, he dressed in 17 regular season games, starting 16, and moved to left tackle following the injury to Isiah Cage midway through the season. His excellent play led him to being named the CFL's Most Outstanding Offensive Lineman and was named to the All-CFL team. Hunter played and started in all three post-season games that year, including the 111th Grey Cup where the Argonauts' defeated the Blue Bombers 41–24.
