= Will Ford =

American gridiron football player and coach (born 1986)

No. 30
- Position: Running back

Personal information
- Born: December 15, 1986 (age 39)
- Listed height: 5 ft 11 in (1.80 m)
- Listed weight: 195 lb (88 kg)

Career information
- High school: Travelers Rest (SC)
- College: South Carolina State

Career history
- 2010: Toronto Argonauts*
- 2012–2013: Winnipeg Blue Bombers
- 2014: Saskatchewan Roughriders
- * Offseason or practice squad member only

Awards and highlights
- CFL East All-Star (2013)
- Stats at CFL.ca (archive)

William Ford (born December 15, 1986) is an American former professional football running back who played in the Canadian Football League (CFL) for the Winnipeg Blue Bombers and Saskatchewan Roughriders. He played college football at South Carolina State University.

== Early life and college ==
William Ford was born on December 15, 1986. He attended Travelers Rest High School in Travelers Rest, South Carolina, participating in football and track. He was inducted into the Travelers Rest High School Athletic Hall of Fame in 2017.

Ford was a member of the South Carolina State Bulldogs of South Carolina State University from 2006 to 2009. He set school and Mid-Eastern Athletic Conference career records for rushing yards and rushing touchdowns with 4,688 yards and 35 touchdowns. He tore his LCL in a playoff game his senior year. Ford was inducted into the South Carolina State Athletics University Hall of Fame in 2016.

== Professional career ==
Ford was rated the 21st best running back in the 2010 NFL draft by NFLDraftScout.com.

Ford signed with the Toronto Argonauts on June 9, 2010. He was released on June 17, 2010, after suffering a high ankle sprain during a preseason game.

Ford was signed by the Winnipeg Blue Bombers in July 2012. He dressed in 11 games for the Blue Bombers in 2012, rushing 23 times for 133 yards and three touchdowns while also catching seven passes for 96 yards on eight targets. In 2013, he recorded 113 carries for 594 yards and two touchdowns, seven receptions for 41 yards and one touchdown on 16 targets, and 45 kickoff returns for 1,047 yards and two touchdowns. Ford was named a CFL East All-Star for his performance during the 2013 season. Ford was released by the Blue Bombers in July 2014.

Ford was signed by the Saskatchewan Roughriders on July 22, 2014. On July 26, 2014, he scored three rushing touchdowns against the Argonauts in his first game for the Roughriders. He dressed in ten games, starting eight, for Saskatchewan in 2014, totaling 85 rushing attempts for 452 yards and six touchdown, seven catches for 70 yards and one touchdown on ten targets, and one kickoff return for 28 yards. Ford was released by the Roughriders on October 21, 2014.

== Personal life ==
Ford has spent time as an assistant coach at his alma mater, Travelers Rest.
