= CFL's Most Outstanding Lineman Award =

Canadian football award

The Most Outstanding Lineman Award was an award annually given to the best defensive player or offensive lineman in the Canadian Football League from the year 1955 to 1973. By the 1974 season, the league decided to make two separate awards for both defensive players and offensive linemen.

== CFL's Most Outstanding Lineman Award winners (1955–1973) ==
- 1973 – Ray Nettles (LB), British Columbia Lions
- 1972 – John Helton (DT), Calgary Stampeders
- 1971 – Wayne Harris (LB), Calgary Stampeders
- 1970 – Wayne Harris (LB), Calgary Stampeders
- 1969 – John LaGrone (DT), Edmonton Eskimos
- 1968 – Ken Lehmann (LB), Ottawa Rough Riders
- 1967 – Ed McQuarters (DT), Saskatchewan Roughriders
- 1966 – Wayne Harris (LB), Calgary Stampeders
- 1965 – Wayne Harris (LB), Calgary Stampeders
- 1964 – Tom Brown (LB), British Columbia Lions
- 1963 – Tom Brown (LB), British Columbia Lions
- 1962 – John Barrow (DT), Hamilton Tiger-Cats
- 1961 – Frank Rigney (OT), Winnipeg Blue Bombers
- 1960 – Herb Gray (DE), Winnipeg Blue Bombers
- 1959 – Roger Nelson (OT), Edmonton Eskimos
- 1958 – Don Luzzi (DT), Calgary Stampeders
- 1957 – Kaye Vaughan (OT), Ottawa Rough Riders
- 1956 – Kaye Vaughan (OT), Ottawa Rough Riders
- 1955 – Tex Coulter (OL), Montreal Alouettes

== CFL's Most Outstanding Lineman Award – Runners Up (1955–1973) ==
Note: Prior to 1973 the runner up for this award was not the DeMarco–Becket Memorial Trophy or Leo Dandurand Trophy winners. Finalists were first announced in 1957.

- 1973 – Ed George (OT), Montreal Alouettes
- 1972 – Jim Stillwagon (DT), Toronto Argonauts
- 1971 – Mark Kosmos (LB), Montreal Alouettes
- 1970 – Angelo Mosca (DT), Hamilton Tiger-Cats
- 1969 – Billy Joe Booth (DE), Ottawa Rough Riders
- 1968 – Ted Urness (C), Saskatchewan Roughriders
- 1967 – John Barrow (DT), Hamilton Tiger-Cats
- 1966 – Wayne Harris (LB), Calgary Stampeders
- 1965 – John Barrow (DT), Hamilton Tiger-Cats
- 1964 – John Barrow (DT), Hamilton Tiger-Cats
- 1963 – Angelo Mosca (DT), Hamilton Tiger-Cats
- 1962 – Wayne Harris (LB), Calgary Stampeders
- 1961 – John Barrow (DT), Hamilton Tiger-Cats
- 1960 – Kaye Vaughan (OT), Ottawa Rough Riders
- 1959 – John Barrow (DT), Hamilton Tiger-Cats
- 1958 – Jackie Simpson (LB), Montreal Alouettes
- 1957 – Art Walker (OT/DG), Edmonton Eskimos
- 1956 – Buddy Alliston (LB/OG), Winnipeg Blue Bombers

- 1955 – Vince Scott, Hamilton; Martin Ruby, Saskatchewan; Dale Meinert, Edmonton

== See also ==
- CFL's Most Outstanding Defensive Player Award
- CFL's Most Outstanding Offensive Lineman Award
