= Chris Van Zeyl =

Canadian gridiron football player (born 1983)

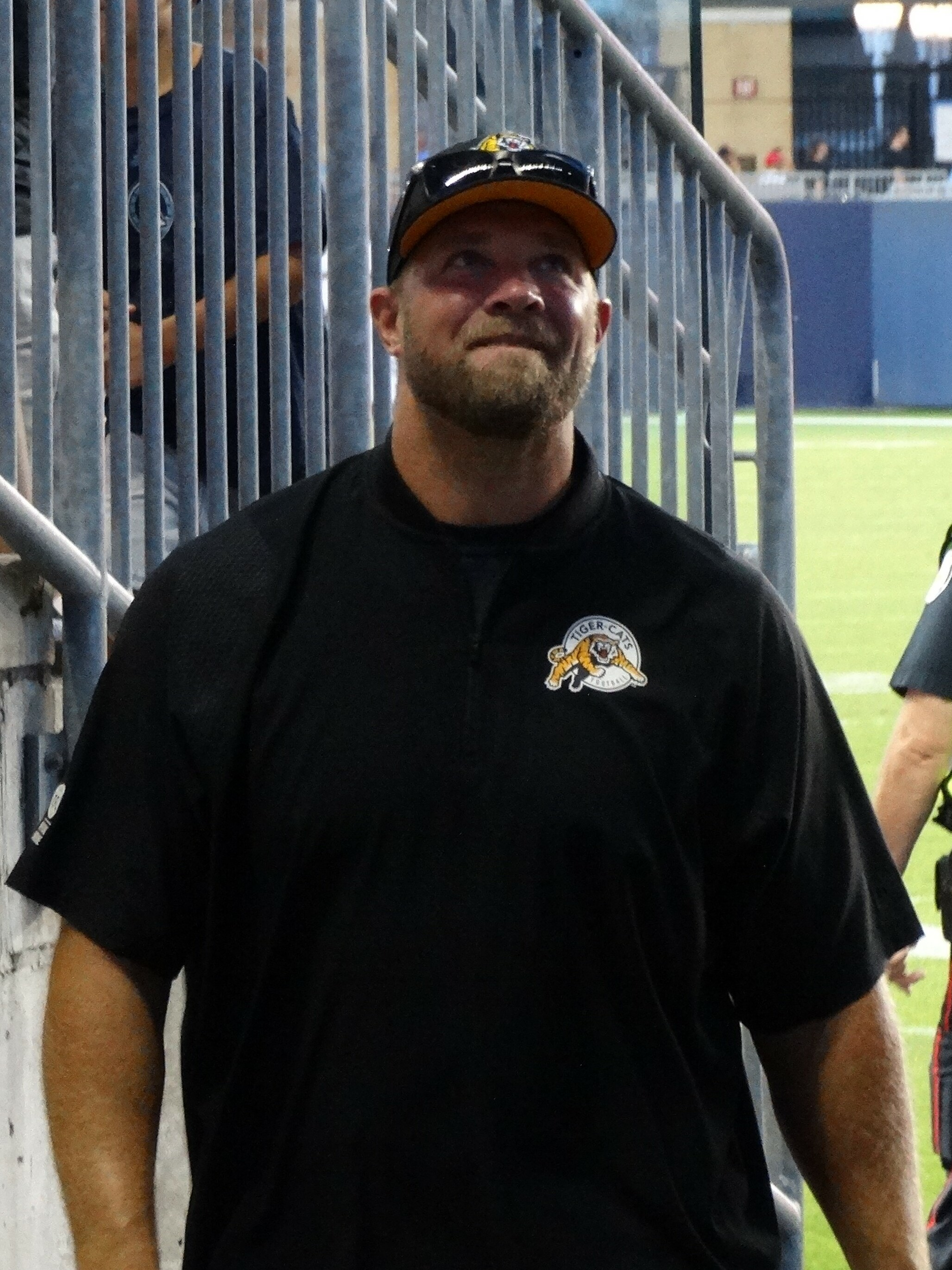
- Van Zeyl with the Hamilton Tiger-Cats in 2022

No. 54
- Position: Offensive tackle

Personal information
- Born: September 4, 1983 (age 43); Fonthill, Ontario, Canada
- Listed height: 6 ft 6 in (1.98 m)
- Listed weight: 312 lb (142 kg)

Career information
- High school: Notre Dame
- College: McMaster
- CFL draft: 2007: 3rd round, 18th overall pick

Career history
- 2007–2008: Montreal Alouettes*
- 2008–2018: Toronto Argonauts
- 2019–2023: Hamilton Tiger-Cats
- * Offseason or practice squad member only

Awards and highlights
- Grey Cup champion (2012, 2017); CFL's Most Outstanding Offensive Lineman Award - 2019; Leo Dandurand Trophy - 2019; 3× CFL All-Star (2013, 2017, 2019); 7× CFL East All-Star (2013, 2014, 2016–2019, 2021)
- Stats at CFL.ca

Chris Van Zeyl (born September 4, 1983) is a Canadian former professional gridiron football offensive tackle who played for 15 years in the Canadian Football League (CFL) for the Montreal Alouettes, Toronto Argonauts, and Hamilton Tiger-Cats. He is a two-time Grey Cup champion with the Argonauts and was named a CFL All-Star three times and CFL East Division All-Star seven times. He was also named the CFL's Most Outstanding Offensive Lineman in 2019. He played CIS Football for the McMaster Marauders as a defensive lineman.

== University career ==
Van Zeyl played for the McMaster Marauders football team from 2004 to 2007 as a defensive tackle. He recorded 42 defensive tackles, 11 sacks, and one forced fumble over his tenure there. He was named a 2007 CIS First-Team All-Canadian and the Marauder Lineman of the Year.

== Professional career ==
=== Montreal Alouettes ===
Van Zeyl was drafted in the third round with the 18th overall pick in the 2007 CFL draft by the Montreal Alouettes and attended training camp with the Alouettes but returned to McMaster in August. He noted that the Alouettes intention was for him to remain as a defensive lineman as a professional player, which was his preferred position. He re-joined Montreal in October and remained on the practice roster for the remainder of the 2007 Montreal Alouettes season. Van Zeyl attended the 2008 Montreal Alouettes training camp and was again added to the practice roster but was released on September 3, 2008.

=== Toronto Argonauts ===
On September 5, 2008, Van Zeyl signed with the Toronto Argonauts as a free agent and was assigned to the Argos practice roster. He was converted to the offensive side of the ball as an offensive lineman and remained on the practice roster for the rest of the year. He re-signed with Toronto on December 3, 2008, for the 2009 Toronto Argonauts season but was released at the end of training camp. He was re-signed to the practice roster on June 27, 2009. He was signed to the active roster on August 27 and dressed in his first professional regular season game on August 28, 2009, in a loss to the Calgary Stampeders. He got his first playing opportunity on October 16, 2009, when starting right tackle, Brian Ramsay, suffered an injury and Van Zeyl was pressed into action. He started his first professional game on October 23, 2009, against the Hamilton Tiger-Cats as well as the last two games of the season.

In 2010, Van Zeyl entered the season as the team's starting right offensive tackle and played in 14 regular season games, missing four due to injury. He recorded his first career reception on a 10-yard pass from Cleo Lemon in the Labour Day Classic on September 6, 2010, but was injured on the play and had to sit out the next game. He started at right tackle in both playoff games for the Argonauts that year, which were his first post-season starts. He played and started in 15 regular season games in 2011 as the Argonauts missed the playoffs for the third time in four years.

During the 2012 Toronto Argonauts season, Van Zeyl started 17 regular season games at right tackle and recorded his first special teams tackle in week 4 against the Winnipeg Blue Bombers. He started in all three post-season games, including the 100th Grey Cup where he earned his first Grey Cup championship in the Argonauts' victory. In 2013, Van Zeyl started 17 regular season games and one playoff game, primarily at right guard, en route to being named a CFL All-Star for the first time in his career.

On July 8, 2014, Van Zeyl signed an extension through the 2016 season with the Argonauts. He started in all 17 regular season games that he played in during the 2014 season and was named an East All-Star at offensive tackle. In 2015, he played in only 14 regular season games, starting 13, while also starting the East Semi-Final game. In 2016, he started all 18 regular season games for the first time in his career and was again named an East All-Star at offensive tackle.

During the offseason, Van Zeyl signed another contract extension with the Argonauts on January 13, 2017, through to the 2019 CFL season. He played and started in 16 regular season games for the team and was named a CFL All-Star for the second time in his career. He started at right tackle for both post-season games, including his second Grey Cup championship in the Argonauts' 105th Grey Cup victory over the Stampeders. He started 17 games at right tackle in 2018 and was once again named an East Division All-Star. In a reportedly salary cap-related move, the Argonauts released Van Zeyl on the day before the start of training camp on May 18, 2019.

=== Hamilton Tiger-Cats ===
On the same day of his Toronto release, the Hamilton Tiger-Cats signed Van Zeyl to a two-year contract on May 18, 2019. He started 17 regular season games and two post-season games for the Tiger-Cats and was named a CFL All-Star for the third time in his career. He re-signed with the Tiger-Cats on January 12, 2021. Van Zeyl played in seven games for the Ticats during the 2021 season. On July 26, 2022, midway through the 2022 season, the Tiger-Cats placed Van Zeyl on the six-game injured list. He only played in six games during the 2022 season.

On May 30, 2023, Van Zeyl was activated from the injured veteran list. At 39 years of age he was the oldest player in the league. He began the season on the injured reserve list, but was activated on June 21, 2023, before the team's third game. Van Zeyl played in six regular season games in 2023 as a backup offensive lineman.

On April 6, 2024, Van Zeyl announced his retirement from professional football. In his career, he appeared in 192 regular season games, 12 playoff games, and four Grey Cup games, including two championship victories.
