= Rudy Phillips =

American gridiron football player (born 1958)

No. 68
- Position: Guard

Personal information
- Born: February 25, 1958 (age 68); Dallas, Texas, U.S.

Career information
- College: North Texas University

Career history
- 1981–1984: Ottawa Rough Riders
- 1986–1987: Edmonton Eskimos
- 1988: Calgary Stampeders

Awards and highlights
- Grey Cup champion (1987); 2× CFL's Most Outstanding Offensive Lineman Award (1982, 1983); 2× Leo Dandurand Trophy (1982, 1983); 3× CFL All-Star (1982, 1983, 1986)
- Canadian Football Hall of Fame (Class of 2009)

Rudolph Phillips (born February 25, 1958) is a former professional Canadian football offensive lineman who played seven seasons in the Canadian Football League (CFL), mainly for the Ottawa Rough Riders. He played college football at North Texas University. He won the CFL's Most Outstanding Offensive Lineman Award in 1982 and 1983. He was inducted into the Canadian Football Hall of Fame in 2009.
