= Tom Brown (guard) =

American football player (1936–2026)

No. 69
- Positions: Defensive lineman, Linebacker

Personal information
- Born: December 5, 1936; Albert Lea, Minnesota, U.S.
- Died: March 12, 2026 (aged 89)
- Listed height: 6 ft 0 in (1.83 m)
- Listed weight: 251 lb (114 kg)

Career information
- College: Minnesota
- NFL draft: 1959: 9th round, 108th overall pick
- AFL draft: 1961: 1st round, 2nd overall pick

Career history
- BC Lions (1961–1967)

Awards and highlights
- Grey Cup champion (1964); 2× CFL's Most Outstanding Lineman Award (1963, 1964); Jeff Nicklin Memorial Trophy (1964); 3× DeMarco–Becket Memorial Trophy (1962, 1963, 1964); 3× CFL All-Star (1962, 1963, 1964); 3× CFL West All-Star (1962, 1963, 1964); National champion (1960); Outland Trophy (1960); UPI Lineman of the Year (1960); Unanimous All-American (1960); Chicago Tribune Silver Football (1960); First-team All-Big Ten (1960); Second-team All-Big Ten (1959)
- Canadian Football Hall of Fame (Class of 1984)
- College Football Hall of Fame

Thomas Eliel Brown (December 5, 1936 – March 12, 2026) was an American professional football player. He played college football for the Minnesota Golden Gophers, and won the Outland Trophy in 1960 as the nation's best lineman. He played professional football with the BC Lions of the Canadian Football League (CFL), and was made a member of the Canadian Football Hall of Fame in 1984. Brown was inducted into College Football Hall of Fame in 2003. He died on March 12, 2026, at the age of 89.
