= Wayne Harris =

American gridiron football player (1938–2015)

No. 55
- Positions: Linebacker, Centre

Personal information
- Born: May 4, 1938; Hampton, Arkansas, U.S.
- Died: June 4, 2015 (aged 77); Calgary, Alberta, Canada
- Listed height: 6 ft 0 in (1.83 m)
- Listed weight: 195 lb (88 kg)

Career information
- High school: El Dorado (AR)
- College: Arkansas
- AFL draft: 1961: 12th round, 91st overall pick

Career history
- 1961–1972: Calgary Stampeders

Awards and highlights
- Grey Cup champion (1971); Grey Cup MVP (1971); 4× CFL's Most Outstanding Lineman Award (1965, 1966, 1970, 1971); 2× DeMarco–Becket Memorial Trophy (1966, 1971); 8× CFL All-Star (1962, 1964–1968, 1970, 1971; 11× CFL West All-Star (1961–1971; Calgary Stampeders No. 55 retired; Second-team All-American (1960); First-team All-SWC (1959)
- Canadian Football Hall of Fame (Class of 1976)
- College Football Hall of Fame (Class of 2004)

Carroll Wayne Harris (May 4, 1938 – June 4, 2015) was an American professional football player who was a linebacker for the Calgary Stampeders of the Canadian Football League (CFL) from 1961 through 1972. His son, Wayne Harris, Jr., coaches football and also played for the Stampeders of the CFL.

== Early life and college ==
Harris was a high school all-American for the El Dorado, Arkansas High School Wildcats and played collegiately for University of Arkansas Razorbacks from 1957 to 1960. In 1960, he was selected as the outstanding player in the Southwest Conference and played in the Cotton Bowl Classic and the All-American Bowl. He was nicknamed "Thumper".

== Professional career ==
Harris was drafted by the Boston Patriots of the American Football League, but opted to play in Canadian Football League for 12 years, all with the Calgary Stampeders. He won the Outstanding Lineman Award a record 4 times. He was named all-Western Conference 11 times and all-Canadian 9 times, appearing in 3 Grey Cup finals: the 56th Grey Cup of 1968, the 58th Grey Cup of 1970, and the 59th Grey Cup of 1971, the latter being the only victory, when he was named Most Outstanding Player in the game. His jersey #55 was retired by the Stampeders in 1973.

== Awards and legacy ==
Harris has been inducted into the Canadian Football Hall of Fame, the College Football Hall of Fame (2004), the Arkansas Sports Hall of Fame, Arkansas' all-century team for the 20th century, and the Alberta Sports Hall of Fame. In November 2006, Harris was voted 9th among the CFL's Top 50 players of the league's modern era by Canadian sports network The Sports Network/TSN, no linebacker being ahead of him.

In 2012 in honour of the 100th Grey Cup, Canada Post used his image on a series of commemorative postage stamps. The image was also used on presentation posters and other materials to promote the Grey Cup game and other celebrations associated with the centennial.

== Later life and death ==
Wayne worked for CanTex drilling as vice president and general manager of operation and served on the CAODC. He died June 4, 2015, at the age of 77.
