= Charlie Turner (Canadian football) =

American football player (1944–2024)

No. 60
- Position: Offensive tackle

Personal information
- Born: December 12, 1944; Weirton, West Virginia, U.S.
- Died: November 5, 2024 (aged 79)
- Listed height: 6 ft 3 in (1.91 m)
- Listed weight: 255 lb (116 kg)

Career information
- College: Ohio

Career history
- 1967–1968, 1970: Hamilton Tiger-Cats
- 1971–1978: Edmonton Eskimos
- 1979: Winnipeg Blue Bombers

Awards and highlights
- 3× Grey Cup champion (1967, 1975, 1978); CFL Most Outstanding Offensive Lineman (1975); DeMarco-Becket Memorial Trophy (1975); 3× CFL All-Star (1973, 1974, 1975); 5× CFL West All-Star (1972, 1973, 1974, 1975, 1977)

Charlie Turner (December 12, 1944 – November 5, 2024) was an American professional football player who was an offensive lineman for 12 seasons in the Canadian Football League (CFL). He won two Grey Cups for the Edmonton Eskimos and another one with the Hamilton Tiger-Cats. He won the CFL's Most Outstanding Offensive Lineman Award in 1975.

Turner was born in Weirton, West Virginia, and grew up in Bellaire, Ohio. He played college football for the Ohio Bobcats. He signed as a free agent with the Buffalo Bills of the American Football League, and spent 1966 on their taxi squad. He joined Hamilton midseason in 1967, when they won the Grey Cup.

Turner died on November 5, 2024, at the age of 79.
