= Ed McQuarters =

American football player (born 1943)

No. 68, 61
- Position: Defensive tackle

Personal information
- Born: April 16, 1943 (age 83); Tulsa, Oklahoma, U.S.
- Listed height: 6 ft 1 in (1.85 m)
- Listed weight: 255 lb (116 kg)

Career information
- High school: Booker T. Washington (Tulsa)
- College: Oklahoma (1961-1964)
- NFL draft: 1965: 18th round, 250th overall pick

Career history
- St. Louis Cardinals (1965); Saskatchewan Roughriders (1966–1974)

Awards and highlights
- Grey Cup champion (1966); 3× CFL All-Star (1967-1969); 3× CFL Western All-Star (1967-1969); 2× DeMarco–Becket Memorial Trophy (1968, 1969); Second-team All-Big Eight (1963)
- Stats at Pro Football Reference
- Canadian Football Hall of Fame

Eddie Lee McQuarters (born April 16, 1943) is a former Canadian football player. He was a defensive tackle for the Saskatchewan Roughriders from 1966 to 1974. McQuarters was inducted into the Canadian Football Hall of Fame in 1988.

== College and NFL ==
After a stellar career as an American football player at the University of Oklahoma, McQuarters was selected in the 18th round of the 1965 NFL draft by the St. Louis Cardinals, but after one year was released.

== Saskatchewan Roughriders ==
McQuarters was a defensive tackle, playing his entire 9-year career for Saskatchewan. The Green Riders played in four Grey Cup games during that period, winning in his rookie year, the 54th Grey Cup in 1966 against the Ottawa Rough Riders.

McQuarters lost his left eye in a home workshop accident prior to the 1971 season, which limited his effectiveness but did not prevent him from playing up to the 1974 season, when he was cut after spending most of the year with knee injuries.

=== Honors and statistics ===
McQuarters was a CFL all-star in 1967, 1968, and 1969, winning the CFL's Most Outstanding Lineman Award in 1967.

McQuarters had 10 fumble recoveries, one of them for an 80-yard touchdown, one interception for a touchdown, and four blocked kicks.

== Video clips ==
Seen in game 3 of the 1970 Western finals against Calgary in its entirety on YouTube
