= Jovan Olafioye =

American gridiron football player (born 1987)

Profile
- Position: Offensive lineman

Personal information
- Born: December 16, 1987 (age 38); Detroit, Michigan, U.S.
- Listed height: 6 ft 6 in (1.98 m)
- Listed weight: 325 lb (147 kg)

Career information
- College: North Carolina Central

Career history
- 2010–2016: BC Lions
- 2012: St. Louis Rams*
- 2017: Montreal Alouettes
- 2018: BC Lions
- * Offseason or practice squad member only

Awards and highlights
- Grey Cup champion (2011); CFL's Most Outstanding Offensive Lineman (2012); 3× DeMarco-Becket Memorial Trophy (2011, 2012, 2015); 6× CFL All-Star (2011–2016); 7× CFL West All-Star (2010–2016)
- Stats at CFL.ca
- Canadian Football Hall of Fame (Class of 2025)

Jovan Olafioye (born December 16, 1987) is an American former professional football offensive lineman who played in the Canadian Football League (CFL). He signed with the BC Lions as a free agent, after going undrafted in the 2009 NFL draft. Jovan attended the 2009 Detroit Lions rookie mini camp. He played junior college football at Grand Rapids Community College for a year before attending North Carolina Central University. He was inducted into the Canadian Football Hall of Fame in 2025.

== Professional career ==
=== BC Lions ===
Olafioye signed with the BC Lions on April 20, 2010, and started all 18 games en route to being named a CFL West All-Star. For the next six seasons, he again started all 18 games and was named a CFL All-Star (All Pro) every year, while also winning the CFL's Most Outstanding Offensive Lineman Award in 2012. The 7x West All Star was also a runner-up to the award in 2011 and 2015. He won his first Grey Cup championship with the Lions in 2011. Following the 2016 BC Lions season in March 2017, rumours began circulating that the Lions were seeking to deal Olafioye to the Alouettes.

=== St. Louis Rams ===
In 2012, there were as many as 15 NFL teams interested in working out Olafioye during the option year window following his second season with B.C. The St. Louis Rams guaranteed him $85,000 in base salary in the first two years. But after agreeing to terms, Olafioye’s contract was disapproved four days later when he failed his physical.

=== Montreal Alouettes ===
On March 27, 2017, Olafioye was traded to the Montreal Alouettes in exchange for the rights to Canadian lineman David Foucault and Vincent Brown. With an estimated salary of $200,000 it was reported the Lions made the deal to free up some cap space. One week after being traded to Montreal, Olafioye and the Als agreed to a 3-year contract extension through the 2019 CFL season. He played in 12 games with the Alouettes in 2017 due to injuries and was released the day before the start of 2018 training camp on May 19, 2018.

=== BC Lions (II) ===
Shortly after his release from the Alouettes, Olafioye re-signed with the BC Lions on May 19, 2018. He announced his retirement from professional football after the 2018 CFL season. He was announced as a member of the Canadian Football Hall of Fame 2025 class on June 12, 2025.
