= Jackie Simpson (linebacker) =

American gridiron football player (1936–1983)

No. 64, 54, 45, 67, 49, 50, 58
- Position: Linebacker

Personal information
- Born: August 20, 1936; Corinth, Mississippi, U.S.
- Died: June 2, 1983 (aged 46); Pontiac, Michigan, U.S.
- Listed height: 6 ft 0 in (1.83 m)
- Listed weight: 225 lb (102 kg)

Career information
- College: Ole Miss
- NFL draft: 1958: 21st round, 246th overall pick

Career history

Playing
- Montreal Alouettes (1958–1961); Calgary Stampeders (1961); Denver Broncos (1961); Oakland Raiders (1962-1964); Winnipeg Blue Bombers (1965); Toronto Argonauts (1965)

Coaching
- San Diego Chargers (1967-1969) Linebackers coach; San Diego Chargers (1970–1971) Defensive backs coach; Houston Oilers (1972) Defensive backs coach; St. Louis Cardinals (1973) Linebackers coach; San Diego Chargers (1974–1980) Defensive coordinator; Seattle Seahawks (1981–1982) Defensive coordinator

Awards and highlights
- CFL's Most Outstanding Lineman Award Runner Up (1958); 2× CFL Eastern All-Star (1958, 1960); First-team All-American (1957); First-team All-SEC (1957)

Career AFL statistics
- Interceptions: 5
- Sacks: 1
- Stats at Pro Football Reference
- Coaching profile at Pro Football Reference

Jack Maylon Simpson (August 20, 1936 – June 3, 1983) was an American professional football player who was a linebacker in the American Football League (AFL). He played college football for the Ole Miss Rebels and in the AFL for the Denver Broncos and the Oakland Raiders. He was selected in the 21st round of the 1958 NFL draft by the Washington Redskins, but did not play. He signed as a free agent with the AFL's Broncos in 1961. He was the defensive coordinator of the Houston Oilers in 1972

Simpson began his pro career in Canada with the Montreal Alouettes, playing 42 games from 1958 to 1961. He was an all-star in 1958 and 1960, and was runner up for the CFL's Most Outstanding Lineman Award in 1958. Jackie also played briefly with the Calgary Stampeders in 1961, but left to finish the season with Denver. Following his AFL career with Denver and Oakland, Simpson went back to the CFL in 1965, and played with the Winnipeg Blue Bombers, and completed the season with the Toronto Argonauts.

Jackie served as an AFL scout in 1966, and after the AFL-NFL merger, he was rehired by the San Diego Chargers to work in the personnel department. Sid Gillman found Simpson to be a valuable asset, and hired him as a linebacker coach in 1967. He remained in that position for 5 years, and then in 1972 was hired as the Houston Oilers defensive coordinator. Jackie left Houston to spend one year (1973) as linebacker coach with the St. Louis Cardinals. Simpson was rehired by the San Diego Chargers as defensive coordinator in 1974, and held that position for 7 years. The team was very successful, and made the playoffs in 1979 and 1980, including the January 1981 AFC championship game. Jackie Simpson coached for the Seattle Seahawks, serving as defensive coordinator during the 1981-82 seasons. He was beginning his final coaching job, again as defensive coordinator, with the Detroit Lions, when he suddenly died on June 2, 1983.

== See also ==
- Other American Football League players
