= David Hewson (Canadian football) =

Canadian football player

Profile
- Position: Cornerback

Personal information
- Born: January 9, 1982 (age 44); Winnipeg, Manitoba, Canada
- Listed height: 6 ft 3 in (1.91 m)
- Listed weight: 222 lb (101 kg)

Career information
- University: University of Manitoba
- CFL draft: 2005: 5th round, 36th overall pick

Career history
- 2005–2006: Toronto Argonauts
- 2007: Winnipeg Blue Bombers
- Stats at CFL.ca

David Hewson (born January 9, 1982) is a Canadian former professional football linebacker who played for the Toronto Argonauts and Winnipeg Blue Bombers of the Canadian Football League.

== Early life ==
Hewson was born in Winnipeg, Manitoba and played football at Kelvin High School. He went on to the University of Manitoba and was one of the Manitoba Bisons top defenders, playing as starter cornerback from 2001 to 2005. He was named the CIS football Defensive Player of the Week twice in 2001 and played in the 2003 East West Bowl. He graduated with a degree in Human Geography with a minor in Business Management.

== Professional career ==
Hewson was drafted in the fifth round of the 2005 CFL draft by the Calgary Stampeders but was released during training camp that year. On November 1, 2005, Hewson was signed by the Toronto Argonauts to the practice roster. He played in 14 regular season games for the Argos in the 2006 CFL season with 11 special team tackles and appeared in both playoff games, collecting two special teams tackles.

In the 2007 CFL season, the Argos released Hewson during training camp and the Winnipeg Blue Bombers signed him to their practice roster on September 12. He dressed for four games in September and October.
