= Don Luzzi =

Canadian football player (1935–2005)

Profile
- Positions: Offensive lineman, Defensive lineman

Personal information
- Born: August 20, 1935; North Branford, Connecticut
- Died: October 30, 2005 (aged 70); Calgary, Alberta
- Listed height: 6 ft 0 in (1.83 m)
- Listed weight: 245 lb (111 kg)

Career information
- College: Villanova

Career history
- 1958–1969: Calgary Stampeders

Awards and highlights
- DeMarco–Becket Memorial Trophy (1958); 3× CFL All-Star (1962, 1963, 1966); 6× CFL West All-Star (1958, 1960–1963, 1966); 2× First-team All-Eastern (1956, 1957)
- Canadian Football Hall of Fame (Class of 1986)

Don Luzzi (August 20, 1935 – October 30, 2005) was a politician and professional football player who played in the Canadian Football League.

== CFL career ==
After playing college football at Villanova University, Don Luzzi played 12 seasons for the Calgary Stampeders from 1958 to 1969. Luzzi was an all-Western conference star, both as an offensive tackle and as a defensive tackle. In 1958, he was selected to the CFL Western All-Star Team at both offensive and defensive tackle positions. He was also an all-Canadian defensive tackle in 1962, 1963, and 1966. His team reached the Grey Cup game once, in 1968, but lost a close game to the Ottawa Rough Riders. Luzzi was elected to the Canadian Football Hall of Fame in 1986.

== Political career ==
Luzzi made a run at provincial politics. He ran for the Alberta Social Credit Party in the 1971 Alberta general election in the riding of Calgary-Buffalo. Luzzi was defeated in a hotly contested election by Ron Ghitter, losing to Ghitter by about 500 votes.

== Videos ==
- Hall of Fame member
