= 1958 CFL season =

Canadian Football League season

- Duration: June – October, 1958
- East champions: Hamilton Tiger-Cats
- West champions: Winnipeg Blue Bombers

46th Grey Cup
- Date: November 29, 1958
- Venue: Empire Stadium, Vancouver
- Champions: Winnipeg Blue Bombers

CFL seasons
- 1957 1959

Canadian Football League team locations: WIFU, IRFU

The 1958 CFL season was the inaugural season of the Canadian Football League, although the season structure was essentially unchanged from the one established three years earlier when the league's founding unions (the Interprovincial Rugby Football Union and the Western Interprovincial Football Union) had effectively barred amateur teams from competing for the Grey Cup.

The Hamilton Tiger-Cats and Winnipeg Blue Bombers met again for Canadian football supremacy. The Blue Bombers turned the tables on the Tiger-Cats this time, winning their first Grey Cup since 1941.

== League news ==
The Canadian Football Council (CFC) withdrew from the Canadian Rugby Union (CRU) to become a separate entity. As a separate entity, the CFC decided to rename its league the Canadian Football League (CFL) on Sunday, January 19, at the Royal Alexandra Hotel in Winnipeg. The CRU deeded the Grey Cup to the newly-minted CFL, officially locking amateur teams out of Grey Cup play. However, the Grey Cup had been the de facto professional football championship of Canada since the Ontario Rugby Football Union withdrew from Grey Cup competition in 1954.

The Commissioner of the CFC, Winnipeg's G. Sydney Halter, QC, was reappointed as the first-ever CFL commissioner. The CFL officially opened its operations on Thursday, August 14, as 18,206 spectators watched the Winnipeg Blue Bombers defeat the Edmonton Eskimos 29–21 at Winnipeg. A regular season game was played in the United States, at Philadelphia's Municipal Stadium on September 14 as the Hamilton Tiger-Cats defeated the Ottawa Rough Riders by a score of 24–18.

== Regular season ==
=== Final regular season standings ===
Note: GP = games played, W = wins, L = losses, T = ties, PF = points for, PA = points against, Pts = points

Western Interprovincial Football Union
Team	GP	W	L	T	PF	PA	Pts
**Winnipeg Blue Bombers**	16	13	3	0	361	182	26
**Edmonton Eskimos**	16	9	6	1	312	292	19
**Saskatchewan Roughriders**	16	7	7	2	320	324	16
Calgary Stampeders	16	6	9	1	314	312	13
BC Lions	16	3	13	0	202	399	6

Interprovincial Rugby Football Union
Team	GP	W	L	T	PF	PA	Pts
**Hamilton Tiger-Cats**	14	10	3	1	291	235	21
**Montreal Alouettes**	14	7	6	1	265	269	15
**Ottawa Rough Riders**	14	6	8	0	233	243	12
Toronto Argonauts	14	4	10	0	266	308	8

- Bold text means a team clinched a playoff berth.
- Winnipeg and Hamilton both received first-round byes.

== Grey Cup playoffs ==
=== Playoff bracket ===
Division Semi-Finals
East
E2	Montreal Alouettes	12
**E3**	**Ottawa Rough Riders**	**26**
West
**W2**	**Edmonton Eskimos**	**58** (27+31)
W3	Saskatchewan Roughriders	12 (11+1)

Division Finals
**E1**	**Hamilton Tiger-Cats**	**54** (35+19)
E2	Ottawa Rough Riders	14 (7+7)
**W1**	**Winnipeg Blue Bombers**	**2** (**30**,7,**23**)
W2	Edmonton Eskimos	1 (7,**30**,7)

46th Grey Cup
E1	Hamilton Tiger-Cats	28
**W1**	**Winnipeg Blue Bombers**	**35**

=== Division Semi-Finals ===
Western Semi-Finals
Edmonton Eskimos vs. Saskatchewan Roughriders
Game	Date	Away	Home
1	November 8	**Edmonton Eskimos 27**	Saskatchewan Roughriders 11
2	November 11	Saskatchewan Roughriders 1	**Edmonton Eskimos 31**

- Edmonton won the total-point series 58–12.

Eastern Semi-Final
Ottawa Rough Riders @ Montreal Alouettes
Date	Away	Home
November 12	**Ottawa Rough Riders 26**	Montreal Alouettes 12

=== Division Finals ===
Western Finals
Winnipeg Blue Bombers vs. Edmonton Eskimos
Game	Date	Away	Home
1	November 15	**Winnipeg Blue Bombers 30**	Edmonton Eskimos 7
2	November 19	**Edmonton Eskimos 30**	Winnipeg Blue Bombers 7
3	November 22	Edmonton Eskimos 7	**Winnipeg Blue Bombers 23**

- Winnipeg won the best-of-three series 2–1.

Eastern Final
Hamilton Tiger-Cats vs. Ottawa Rough Riders
Date	Away	Home
November 20?	**Hamilton Tiger-Cats 35**	Ottawa Rough Riders 7
November 23?	Ottawa Rough Riders 7	**Hamilton Tiger-Cats 19**

- Hamilton won the total-point series 54–14.

=== Grey Cup Championship ===
November 29, Empire Stadium, Vancouver, British Columbia
WIFU Champion	IRFU Champion
**Winnipeg Blue Bombers 35**	Hamilton Tiger-Cats 28
**The Winnipeg Blue Bombers won the 46th Grey Cup Championship**

- Note: Western Semi-Final dates are not confirmed; however, since (1) the regular season ended on November 1 in the West and on November 8 in the East, and (2) all other playoff dates are accurate, including the date of the Grey Cup game, it is reasonable to assume the above dates are correct.

== CFL leaders ==
- CFL passing leaders
- CFL rushing leaders
- CFL receiving leaders

== 1958 Eastern All-Stars ==
=== Offence ===
- QB – Bernie Faloney, Hamilton Tiger-Cats
- RB – Joel Wells, Montreal Alouettes
- RB – Gerry McDougall, Hamilton Tiger-Cats
- RB – Dick Shatto, Toronto Argonauts
- E – Red O'Quinn, Montreal Alouettes
- E – Paul Dekker, Hamilton Tiger-Cats
- FW – Ron Howell, Hamilton Tiger-Cats
- C – Tommy Hugo, Montreal Alouettes
- C – Norm Stoneburgh, Toronto Argonauts
- OG – Hardiman Cureton, Ottawa Rough Riders
- OG – Jackie Simpson, Montreal Alouettes
- OT – Dick Fouts, Toronto Argonauts
- OT – John Barrow, Hamilton Tiger-Cats

=== Defence ===
- DT – Milt Graham, Ottawa Rough Riders
- DT – John Barrow, Hamilton Tiger-Cats
- DE – Pete Neumann, Hamilton Tiger-Cats
- DE – Doug McNichol, Montreal Alouettes
- DG – Vince Scott, Hamilton Tiger-Cats
- DG – Jackie Simpson, Montreal Alouettes
- LB – Tommy Hugo, Montreal Alouettes
- LB – Tony Curcillo, Hamilton Tiger-Cats
- DB – Hal Patterson, Montreal Alouettes
- DB – Ralph Goldston, Hamilton Tiger-Cats
- DB – Ed Macon, Hamilton Tiger-Cats
- S – Bobby Simpson, Ottawa Rough Riders

== 1958 Western All-Stars ==
=== Offence ===
- QB – Jackie Parker, Edmonton Eskimos
- RB – Cookie Gilchrist, Saskatchewan Roughriders
- RB – Jack Hill, Saskatchewan Roughriders
- RB – Leo Lewis, Winnipeg Blue Bombers
- RB – Johnny Bright, Edmonton Eskimos
- E – Ken Carpenter, Saskatchewan Roughriders
- E – Ernie Warlick, Calgary Stampeders
- C – Jim Furey, Calgary Stampeders
- OG – Harry Langford, Calgary Stampeders
- OG – Tom Hinton, British Columbia Lions
- OT – Don Luzzi, Calgary Stampeders
- OT – Roger Nelson, Edmonton Eskimos

=== Defence ===
- DT – Don Luzzi, Calgary Stampeders
- DT – Buddy Tinsley, Winnipeg Blue Bombers
- DE – Art Walker, Edmonton Eskimos
- DE – Herb Gray, Winnipeg Blue Bombers
- MG – Steve Patrick, Winnipeg Blue Bombers
- LB – Rollie Miles, Edmonton Eskimos
- LB – Gord Rowland, Winnipeg Blue Bombers
- LB – David Burkholder, Winnipeg Blue Bombers
- LB – Ted Tully, Edmonton Eskimos
- DB – Jack Gotta, Calgary Stampeders
- DB – Larry Isbell, Saskatchewan Roughriders
- S – Oscar Kruger, Edmonton Eskimos

== 1958 CFL awards ==
- CFL's Most Outstanding Player Award: Jackie Parker (QB), Edmonton Eskimos
- CFL's Most Outstanding Canadian Award: Ron Howell (FW), Hamilton Tiger-Cats
- CFL's Most Outstanding Lineman Award: Don Luzzi (OT/DT), Calgary Stampeders
- Jeff Russel Memorial Trophy (IRFU MVP) – Sam Etcheverry (QB), Montreal Alouettes
- Jeff Nicklin Memorial Trophy (WIFU MVP) - Jackie Parker (QB), Edmonton Eskimos
- Gruen Trophy (IRFU Rookie of the Year) - Russ Jackson (QB), Ottawa Rough Riders
- Dr. Beattie Martin Trophy (WIFU Rookie of the Year) - Walt Radzick (DT), Calgary Stampeders
- DeMarco–Becket Memorial Trophy (WIFU Outstanding Lineman) - Don Luzzi (OT/DT), Calgary Stampeders

== 1958 Miss Grey Cup ==
- Miss Montreal Alouettes Joan Van Boven was named Miss Grey Cup 1958
