= 2013 CFL season =

Canadian Football League season

- Duration: June 27 – November 2, 2013
- East champions: Hamilton Tiger Cats
- West champions: Saskatchewan Roughriders

101st Grey Cup
- Date: November 24, 2013
- Venue: Mosaic Stadium at Taylor Field, Regina
- Champions: Saskatchewan Roughriders

CFL seasons
- ← 2012 2014 →

Canadian Football League team locations: West, East

The 2013 CFL season was the 60th season of modern-day Canadian football. Officially, it was the 56th season of the Canadian Football League.

The pre-season began on June 12, 2013 and the regular season began on June 27, 2013. Regina, Saskatchewan hosted the 101st Grey Cup on November 24, with the Cup won by the Saskatchewan Roughriders.

== CFL news in 2013 ==
=== Salary cap ===
According to a new collective bargaining agreement, the 2013 salary cap was set at $4,400,000. As per the agreement, the cap is fixed and does not vary with league revenue performance. The minimum team salary was set at $4,000,000, with individual minimum salaries set at $45,000.

=== Season schedule ===
The 2013 season schedule was released on March 5, 2013, with the regular season opening on June 27 at the new Investors Group Field in Winnipeg, Manitoba. This was the first time Winnipeg had opened the regular season since 1998 and the first brand new Canadian stadium in the CFL since Toronto's SkyDome opened in 1989 (the Alamodome opened in 1993 with the now defunct San Antonio Texans playing there in 1995). For the second time in three years, the Toronto Argonauts and Hamilton Tiger-Cats did not play in their Labour Day Classic matchup, due to scheduling conflicts for both teams. Following the previous year's experiment, the league held all division matchups not only in the last week, but for the final four weeks in total, hoping for a tight playoff race. There were 15 double headers, with one on a Thursday, three on Fridays, nine on Saturdays, one on a Sunday, and the traditional Thanksgiving contests on a Monday.

=== Bye weeks ===
For the second consecutive year, the teams' bye weeks occurred in the sixth and seventh weeks of the season, earlier than the usual eighth and ninth week setup that had been in place since 2007. These began over the August Civic Holiday, suggesting that this was done to accommodate for fans' vacation plans.

=== Stadium changes ===
The Hamilton Tiger-Cats played 2013 home games at Alumni Stadium in Guelph, with the exception of Touchdown Atlantic (see below). The team's previous venue, Ivor Wynne Stadium, was demolished during the offseason, and its replacement, Tim Hortons Field, would not be ready until at least 2014. For the first time in decades, the Tiger-Cats did not host the Labour Day Classic and instead traveled to Vancouver to face the BC Lions that weekend. Because Ontario University Athletics (of which Alumni Stadium's primary tenants, the Guelph Gryphons, are a member) also has a tradition of playing football games on Labour Day, finding a suitable venue within Southern Ontario would have been impossible. The Toronto at Hamilton matchup was instead played as the nightcap in the 2013 Thanksgiving Day Classic.

The Winnipeg Blue Bombers finally took residence at the new Investors Group Field. The stadium was supposed to have been readied in 2012, but construction delays pushed back the opening to the 2013 season. The Toronto Argonauts hosted the Montreal Alouettes at the University of Toronto's Varsity Stadium for their preseason game, the first Argonauts game at Varsity Stadium in 55 years.

=== Return of Touchdown Atlantic ===
After a one-year hiatus in 2012, Touchdown Atlantic returned for the 2013 season with the Hamilton Tiger-Cats hosting the Montreal Alouettes on September 21, 2013. This was the third regular season instalment of the game and the second to feature the Tiger-Cats. This was the first appearance for the Alouettes and it was also the first matchup to feature division opponents.

=== Media ===
On March 21, 2013, the CFL announced it had renewed its exclusive contract with TSN to televise all CFL games through 2018; the contract included the national radio rights to the Grey Cup, which would air on TSN Radio and The Team. The contract had originally been set to expire at the end of the 2013 season.

As with the previous contract, the league had no games broadcast on terrestrial television, prolonging an absence dating to 2007 and making it the largest league in North America without over-the-air television broadcasts.

On June 21, 2013, the CFL announced it had renewed its distribution deal with NBC Sports Network for United States broadcasts and that ESPN2 would also pick up five additional games for live broadcast. ESPN3 continued to serve as the league's online broadcaster.

=== Rule changes ===
On April 10, 2013 the CFL Board of Governors approved 2 new rules. The first stated that coaches would be allowed to challenge the result of a field goal attempt or extra point attempt. The second rule gave coaches more flexibility on when they can use their timeouts. Coaches could now use both of their time outs at any point during regulation time of a game, as long as they didn't use more than one after the three-minute warning was sounded in the second half of the game. In the past coaches were only allowed to use one time out per half.

=== Coaching changes ===
Immediately following the close of the 2012 CFL season it seemed probable that there would be no head coaching changes in the off-season.

However, after a disappointing 6–12 regular season the Hamilton Tiger-Cats fired George Cortez. The expectations on the Ticats were very high after the off-season acquisitions of Henry Burris and Andy Fantuz which Cortez failed to live up to. The Tiger-Cats replaced Cortez with Kent Austin. Austin, who won the 95th Grey Cup with the Saskatchewan Roughriders, had been the offensive coordinator at the University of Mississippi and the head coach of Cornell University for 3 years each.

In mid-January, 2013, the Montreal Alouettes lost their head coach Marc Trestman to the Chicago Bears of the NFL. Trestman won two Grey Cups in five seasons as the head coach of the Alouettes from 2008 to 2012. On February 19 the Alouettes announced that Dan Hawkins would be the new head coach. Hawkins had been the head coach of Willamette University, Boise State and University of Colorado from 1993 to 2010.

Dan Hawkins was fired on August 1, 2013, after a 2–3 start to the season. Longtime general manager Jim Popp was interim head coach for the remainder of the season.

Tim Burke was fired on November 12, 2013 after the Winnipeg Blue Bombers finished last in the league with a dismal 3–15 record.

=== Trade deadline ===
The deadline for teams to complete trades was Wednesday October 9 at 3:59pm EDT.

== Regular season ==
=== Structure ===
Teams played eighteen regular season games, playing two of the three divisional opponents three times, the other four times, and teams from the opposing division twice. Teams were awarded two points for a win and one point for a tie. The top three teams in each division qualified for the playoffs, with the first place team gaining a bye to the divisional finals. A fourth place team in one division could qualify ahead of the third place team in the other division (the "Crossover"), if they earned more points in the season.

If two or more teams in the same division were equal in points, the following tiebreakers applied:

- a) Most wins in all games
- b) Head to head winning percentage (matches won divided by all matches played)
- c) Head to head points difference
- d) Head to head points ratio
- e–g) Tiebreakers b–d applied sequentially to all divisional games
- h–i) Tiebreakers c–d applied sequentially to all league games
- j) Coin toss

Notes:

- 1. If two clubs remained tied after other club(s) are eliminated during any step, tie breakers reverted to step a).
- 2. Tiebreakers did not apply to the Crossover. To cross over a team must have more points than the third place team.

=== Standings ===
Note: GP = Games Played, W = Wins, L = Losses, T = Ties, PF = Points For, PA = Points Against, Pts = Points

Teams in bold are in playoff positions.

West Division
Team	GP	W	L	T	PF	PA	Pts	
**Calgary Stampeders**	18	14	4	0	549	413	28	Details
**Saskatchewan Roughriders**	18	11	7	0	519	398	22	Details
**BC Lions**	18	11	7	0	504	461	22	Details
Edmonton Eskimos	18	4	14	0	421	519	8	Details

East Division
Team	GP	W	L	T	PF	PA	Pts	
**Toronto Argonauts**	18	11	7	0	507	458	22	Details
**Hamilton Tiger-Cats**	18	10	8	0	453	468	20	Details
**Montreal Alouettes**	18	8	10	0	459	471	16	Details
Winnipeg Blue Bombers	18	3	15	0	361	585	6	Details

- Saskatchewan finished 2nd in the West Division because they won the season series over BC (2-1).

=== Weekly results ===
Abbreviation and Color Key: BC Lions - BC • Calgary Stampeders - CAL • Edmonton Eskimos - EDM • Hamilton Tiger-Cats - HAM Montreal Alouettes - MON • Toronto Argonauts - TOR • Saskatchewan Roughriders - SAS • Winnipeg Blue Bombers - WBB Preseason Win • Preseason Loss • Regular Season Win • Regular Season Loss • BYE • Home
Team	Game																				
Team	A	B	1	2	3	4	5	6	7	8	9	10	11	12	13	14	15	16	17	18	19
BC Lions	CAL	EDM	CAL	TOR	EDM	EDM	TOR	WBB	**BYE**	CAL	MON	HAM	HAM	MON	SAS	WBB	SAS	CAL	SAS	EDM	CAL
BC Lions	29–27	27–22	44–32	24–16	17–3	31–21	38–12	27–20	**BYE**	26–22	39–38	29–26	37–29	36–14	24–22	53–17	31–17	40–26	35–14	43–29	26-7
Calgary Stampeders	BC	SAS	BC	SAS	MON	MON	WBB	**BYE**	SAS	BC	TOR	EDM	EDM	HAM	TOR	HAM	WBB	BC	EDM	SAS	BC
Calgary Stampeders	29–27	24–23	44–32	36–21	22–14	38–27	37–24	**BYE**	42–27	26–22	35–14	37–34	22–12	26–22	33–27	35–11	38–11	40–26	27-13	29-25	26-7
Edmonton Eskimos	SAS	BC	SAS	HAM	BC	BC	MON	HAM	**BYE**	TOR	SAS	CAL	CAL	WBB	WBB	TOR	MON	SAS	CAL	BC	SAS
Edmonton Eskimos	31–24	27–22	39–18	30–20	17–3	21–31	27–32	30–29	**BYE**	33–36	30–27	34–37	22–12	7–25	35–27 (OT)	34–22	47–24	9–14	27–13	29–43	30-26
Hamilton Tiger-Cats	MON	WBB	TOR	EDM	WBB	SAS	SAS	EDM	**BYE**	WBB	WBB	BC	BC	CAL	MON	CAL	TOR	TOR	MON	MON	WBB
Hamilton Tiger-Cats	33–26	33–26	39–34	30–20	25–20	37–0	32–20	30–29	**BYE**	37–18	37–14	29–26	37–29	26–22	28–26	35–11	33–19	24–18	36–5	27–24	37-7
Montreal Alouettes	HAM	TOR	WBB	WBB	CAL	CAL	EDM	**BYE**	TOR	SAS	BC	TOR	TOR	BC	HAM	SAS	EDM	WBB	HAM	HAM	TOR
Montreal Alouettes	33–26	24–20	38–33	19–11	22–14	38–27	32–27	**BYE**	38–13	24–21	39–38	20–9	37–30	36–14	28–26	17–12	47–24	34–27	36-5	27-24	23-20
Toronto Argonauts	WBB	MON	HAM	BC	SAS	WBB	BC	**BYE**	MON	EDM	CAL	MON	MON	SAS	CAL	EDM	HAM	HAM	WBB	WBB	MON
Toronto Argonauts	24–6	24–20	39–34	24–16	39–28	35–19	38–12	**BYE**	38–13	36–33	35–14	20–9	37–30	31–29	33–27	34–22	33–19	24–18	26–20	36–21	23-20
Saskatchewan Roughriders	EDM	CAL	EDM	CAL	TOR	HAM	HAM	**BYE**	CAL	MON	EDM	WBB	WBB	TOR	BC	MON	BC	EDM	BC	CAL	EDM
Saskatchewan Roughriders	31–24	24–23	39–18	36–21	39–28	37–0	32–20	**BYE**	42–27	24–21	30–27	48–25	25–13	31–29	24–22	17–12	31–17	14–9	35-14	29-25	30-26
Winnipeg Blue Bombers	TOR	HAM	MON	MON	HAM	TOR	CAL	BC	**BYE**	HAM	HAM	SAS	SAS	EDM	EDM	BC	CAL	MON	TOR	TOR	HAM
Winnipeg Blue Bombers	24-6	52-0	38-33	19-11	25–20	35–19	37–24	27–20	**BYE**	37–18	37–14	48–25	25–13	25–7	35–27 (OT)	53–17	38–11	34-27	26–20	36–21	37-7

=== 2013 average attendance ===
- Saskatchewan 37,503
- Edmonton 32,095
- Winnipeg 30,637
- Calgary 29,262
- BC 28,310
- Montreal 23,004
- Toronto 21,926
- Hamilton 13,298

== CFL playoffs ==
The Calgary Stampeders were first to clinch a playoff berth, in Week 12 of the schedule. Toronto and BC followed in Week 14, followed by Saskatchewan and Hamilton in Week 15, and the final playoff spot was clinched by Montreal in Week 17. Three of the four home playoff hosts were determined in Week 17.

The Saskatchewan Roughriders are the 2013 Grey Cup Champions, winning their fourth title on home turf at Mosaic Stadium at Taylor Field by defeating the Hamilton Tiger-Cats, 45–23. Roughriders' running back Kory Sheets was named the MVP, while Roughriders' slotback, Chris Getzlaf was named the Grey Cup's Most Valuable Canadian.

=== Playoff bracket ===
November 10: Division Semi-Finals
East
E3	Montreal Alouettes	16
E2	Hamilton Tiger-Cats	19*
West
W3	BC Lions	25
W2	Saskatchewan Roughriders	29

November 17: Division Finals
E2	Hamilton Tiger-Cats	36
E1	Toronto Argonauts	24
W2	Saskatchewan Roughriders	35
W1	Calgary Stampeders	13

November 24: 101st Grey Cup; Mosaic Stadium at Taylor Field – Regina
E2	Hamilton Tiger-Cats	23
W2	Saskatchewan Roughriders	45

*-Team won in Overtime.

== Award winners ==
=== CFL Player of the Week ===
Week	Offensive Player of the Week	Defensive Player of the Week	Special Teams Player of the Week	Outstanding Canadian
One	Ricky Ray	Charleston Hughes	Lindsey Lamar	Jon Cornish
Two	Hugh Charles	Bryant Turner	Jock Sanders	Andrew Harris
Three	Kory Sheets	Renauld Williams	Rene Paredes	Andre Durie
Four	Darian Durant	Renauld Williams	Rene Paredes	Rob Bagg
Five	Bo Levi Mitchell	Kyries Hebert	Sean Whyte	Shea Emry
Six	Travis Lulay	Solomon Elimimian	Luca Congi	Samuel Giguere
Seven	Jon Cornish	Alonzo Lawrence	Chad Owens	Jon Cornish
Eight	Ricky Ray	Tyron Brackenridge	Tim Brown	Marc-Olivier Brouillette
Nine	Kory Sheets	Dee Webb	Tyron Carrier	Eric Deslauriers
Ten	Maurice Price	Charleston Hughes	Joe Burnett	Marc-Olivier Brouillette
Eleven	Henry Burris	Demond Washington	Will Ford	Jon Cornish
Twelve	Mike Reilly	Adam Bighill	Rob Maver	Chris Getzlaf
Thirteen	Zach Collaros	Chip Cox	Brett Lauther	Andre Durie
Fourteen	Chad Kackert	Adam Bighill	Trent Guy	Jabari Arthur
Fifteen	Jon Cornish	Jerald Brown	Will Ford	Jon Cornish
Sixteen	C.J. Gable	Rennie Curran	Rob Maver	Jon Cornish
Seventeen	Kory Sheets	Chip Cox	Bo Bowling	Jon Cornish
Eighteen	Ricky Ray	Charleston Hughes	Brandon Banks	Jon Cornish
Nineteen	Chris Garrett	Rennie Curran	Jamal Miles	Andrew Harris
Twenty	Darian Durant	Simoni Lawrence	Christopher Milo	Andrew Harris
Twenty-one	Kory Sheets	Jermaine McElveen	Diamond Ferri	Andy Fantuz

=== CFL Player of the Month ===
Month	Offensive Player of the Month	Defensive Player of the Month	Special Teams Player of the Month	Outstanding Canadian
July	Kory Sheets	Kyries Hebert	Rene Paredes	Jon Cornish
August	Darian Durant	Chip Cox	Christopher Milo	Marc-Olivier Brouillette
September	Zach Collaros	Adam Bighill	Rene Paredes	John Cornish
October	Jon Cornish	Chip Cox	Rene Paredes	Jon Cornish

== 2013 CFL All-Stars ==
=== Offence ===
- QB – Ricky Ray, Toronto Argonauts
- RB – Jon Cornish, Calgary Stampeders
- RB – Kory Sheets, Saskatchewan Roughriders
- R – S. J. Green, Montreal Alouettes
- R – Fred Stamps, Edmonton Eskimos
- R – Marquay McDaniel, Calgary Stampeders
- R – Weston Dressler, Saskatchewan Roughriders
- OT – Stanley Bryant, Calgary Stampeders
- OT – Jovan Olafioye, BC Lions
- OG – Brendon LaBatte, Saskatchewan Roughriders
- OG – Chris Van Zeyl, Toronto Argonauts
- OC – Jeff Keeping, Toronto Argonauts

=== Defence ===
- DT – Khalif Mitchell, Toronto Argonauts
- DT – Almondo Sewell, Edmonton Eskimos
- DE – Alex Hall, Saskatchewan Roughriders
- DE – Charleston Hughes, Calgary Stampeders
- LB – Chip Cox, Montreal Alouettes
- LB – Adam Bighill, BC Lions
- LB – Henoc Muamba, Winnipeg Blue Bombers
- CB – Geoff Tisdale, Montreal Alouettes
- CB – Pat Watkins, Toronto Argonauts
- DB – Jerald Brown, Montreal Alouettes
- DB – Ryan Phillips, BC Lions
- S – Tyron Brackenridge, Saskatchewan Roughriders

=== Special teams ===
- K – Rene Paredes, Calgary Stampeders
- P – Rob Maver, Calgary Stampeders
- ST – Larry Taylor, Calgary Stampeders

== 2013 CFL Western All-Stars ==
=== Offence ===
- QB – Darian Durant, Saskatchewan Roughriders
- RB – Jon Cornish, Calgary Stampeders
- RB – Kory Sheets, Saskatchewan Roughriders
- R – Weston Dressler, Saskatchewan Roughriders
- R – Chris Getzlaf, Saskatchewan Roughriders
- R – Marquay McDaniel, Calgary Stampeders
- R – Fred Stamps, Edmonton Eskimos
- OT – Stanley Bryant, Calgary Stampeders
- OT – Jovan Olafioye, BC Lions
- OG – Brendon LaBatte, Saskatchewan Roughriders
- OG – Jon Gott, Calgary Stampeders
- OC – Brett Jones, Calgary Stampeders

=== Defence ===
- DT – Tearrius George, Saskatchewan Roughriders
- DT – Almondo Sewell, Edmonton Eskimos
- DE – Alex Hall, Saskatchewan Roughriders
- DE – Charleston Hughes, Calgary Stampeders
- LB – Adam Bighill, BC Lions
- LB – Solomon Elimimian, BC Lions
- LB – Juwan Simpson, Calgary Stampeders
- CB – Cord Parks, BC Lions
- CB – Dante Marsh, BC Lions
- DB – Dwight Anderson, Saskatchewan Roughriders
- DB – Ryan Phillips, BC Lions
- S – Tyron Brackenridge, Saskatchewan Roughriders

=== Special teams ===
- K – Rene Paredes, Calgary Stampeders
- P – Rob Maver, Calgary Stampeders
- ST – Larry Taylor, Calgary Stampeders

== 2013 CFL Eastern All-Stars ==
=== Offence ===
- QB – Ricky Ray, Toronto Argonauts
- RB – C. J. Gable, Hamilton Tiger-Cats
- RB – Will Ford, Winnipeg Blue Bombers
- R – Andre Durie, Toronto Argonauts
- R – Bakari Grant, Hamilton Tiger-Cats
- R – S. J. Green, Montreal Alouettes
- R – Chad Owens, Toronto Argonauts
- OT – Josh Bourke, Montreal Alouettes
- OT – Glenn January, Winnipeg Blue Bombers
- OG – Chris Van Zeyl, Toronto Argonauts
- OG – Greg Wojt, Hamilton Tiger-Cats
- OC – Jeff Keeping, Toronto Argonauts

=== Defence ===
- DT – Bryant Turner, Winnipeg Blue Bombers
- DT – Khalif Mitchell, Toronto Argonauts
- DE – John Bowman, Montreal Alouettes
- DE – Brandon Boudreaux, Hamilton Tiger-Cats
- LB – Chip Cox, Montreal Alouettes
- LB – Robert McCune, Toronto Argonauts
- LB – Henoc Muamba, Winnipeg Blue Bombers
- CB – Geoff Tisdale, Montreal Alouettes
- CB – Pat Watkins, Toronto Argonauts
- DB – Jerald Brown, Montreal Alouettes
- DB – Billy Parker, Montreal Alouettes
- S – Mike Edem, Montreal Alouettes

=== Special teams ===
- K – Sean Whyte, Montreal Alouettes
- P – Josh Bartel, Hamilton Tiger-Cats
- ST – Marc Beswick, Hamilton Tiger-Cats

== 2013 Gibson's Finest CFL Awards ==
- CFL's Most Outstanding Player Award – Jon Cornish (RB), Calgary Stampeders
- CFL's Most Outstanding Canadian Award – Jon Cornish (RB), Calgary Stampeders
- CFL's Most Outstanding Defensive Player Award – Chip Cox (LB), Montreal Alouettes
- CFL's Most Outstanding Offensive Lineman Award – Brendon LaBatte (OG), Saskatchewan Roughriders
- CFL's Most Outstanding Rookie Award – Brett Jones (OL), Calgary Stampeders
- John Agro Special Teams Award – Rene Paredes (K), Calgary Stampeders
- Tom Pate Memorial Award – Kyries Hebert (LB), Montreal Alouettes
- Jake Gaudaur Veterans' Trophy – Shea Emry (LB), Montreal Alouettes
- Annis Stukus Trophy – Corey Chamblin, Saskatchewan Roughriders
- Commissioner's Award – Dwayne Mandrusiak, Edmonton Eskimos Equipment Manager
- Hugh Campbell Distinguished Leadership Award - no recipient
