= Marc-Olivier Brouillette =

Canadian football player (born 1986)

No. 19
- Positions: Linebacker, Safety

Personal information
- Born: February 14, 1986 (age 40); Montreal, Quebec
- Listed height: 6 ft 1 in (1.85 m)
- Listed weight: 230 lb (104 kg)

Career information
- University: Montreal
- CFL draft: 2010: 3rd round, 23rd overall pick

Career history
- 2010–2016: Montreal Alouettes
- 2017–2018: Saskatchewan Roughriders

Awards and highlights
- CFL East All-Star (2016)
- Stats at CFL.ca

Marc-Olivier Brouillette (born February 14, 1986) is a retired Canadian football linebacker. He was drafted 23rd overall by the Montreal Alouettes in the 2010 CFL draft. He played college football for the Montreal Carabins as the team's starting quarterback.

== Professional career ==
=== Montreal Alouettes ===
After being drafted by the Alouettes, it was announced that Brouillette had signed a contract with the Montreal Alouettes on May 17, 2010. In seven seasons with the Alouettes, Brouillette played in 103 games registering 195 tackles, 31 special teams tackles, 8 sacks, 6 forced fumbles and 5 interceptions. He was named a CFL East All-Star for his performance during the 2016 season.

=== Saskatchewan Roughriders ===
On February 15, 2017, Brouillette signed with the Saskatchewan Roughriders. Brouillette planned to wear the number 4 jersey, which was his number in university, however he retired on May 27, 2017 just prior to the team's training camp. He re-joined the team on September 20, 2017.
