= 1956 in aviation =

This is a list of aviation-related events from 1956.

== Events ==
=== January ===
- Vietnam Civil Aviation is founded as the national civil aviation authority of North Vietnam, functioning as an element of the Vietnam People's Air Force responsible for state management, national defense, and commercialization of civilian air transportation. It also operates as North Vietnam's national airline, with a fleet that consists initially of two Lisunov Li-2 aircraft.
- Lebanese International Airways begins flight operations.
- January 15 – The Japan Maritime Self-Defense Force acquires its first aircraft, taking delivery of Lockheed P2V-7 Neptune maritime patrol planes from the United States Navy.

=== February ===
- February 4 – The East German national airline Deutsche Lufthansa (DLH) begins scheduled passenger flights, offering service between East Berlin and Warsaw.
- February 8 – Eight Hawker Hunter fighters of the Royal Air Force's Central Fighter Establishment are caught in suddenly deteriorating weather with little fuel left and try to land at RAF Marham, England. Two land safely, but the other six are destroyed in crashes in the vicinity of Swaffham and RAF Marham, with one of the pilots killed.
- February 18 – An engine fire breaks out on a Scottish Airlines Avro York just after takeoff from RAF Luqa, Malta. The aircraft stalls as the crew attempts to turn back to the airport and crashes into the ground near Zurrieq, Malta, killing all 50 people on board.

=== March ===
- The Piasecki Helicopter Corporation is renamed Vertol Aircraft Corporation.
- The United Kingdom′s Marine Aircraft Experimental Establishment shuts down. Its surviving activities are split among the British Air Ministry, the Aeroplane and Armament Experimental Establishment, and the Royal Aircraft Establishment.
- March 1 – East Germany establishes its air force, the Luftstreitkräfte der Nationalen Volksarmee (LSK) or Air Forces of the National People's Army.
- March 2 – Practising for an upcoming air show, four Canadair Sabre Mk. 6 fighters of the Sky Lancers aerobatics team of No. 4 Wing, Royal Canadian Air Force, based at RCAF Station Baden-Soellingen in West Germany, fly into the ground in the Upper Rhine Valley southwest of Strasbourg, France, while performing a loop in formation, killing all four pilots. The accident brings a halt to RCAF aerobatic flying for several years.
- March 10
  - A United States Air Force B-47E-95-BW Stratojet on a nonstop flight from MacDill Air Force Base, Florida, to an overseas base with two nuclear weapon cores aboard disappears over the Mediterranean Sea after descending into dense clouds at an altitude of 14,000 feet (4,300 meters) to prepare for in-flight refueling. No trace of the aircraft, its three-man crew, or the cores are ever found.
  - Fairey Aviation test pilot Peter Twiss sets a new airspeed record in the Fairey Delta 2, also becoming the first person to exceed 1,000 mph (1,600 km/h) in level flight. His top speed is 1,132 mph (1,822 km/h).
- March 24 – Aeropostal Alas de Venezuela (LAV) introduces its first turboprop airliner – a Vickers Viscount 701, into service.

=== April ===
- April 1 – Trans World Airlines Flight 400, a Martin 4-0-4, crashes on takeoff from Greater Pittsburgh International Airport in Allegheny County, Pennsylvania, killing 22 of the 36 people on board.
- April 2
  - A Lockheed F-104 Starfighter piloted by Joe Ozier exceeds Mach 2 for the first time, becoming the first production fighter to do so.
  - Northwest Orient Airlines Flight 2 ditches in Puget Sound shortly after takeoff from Seattle-Tacoma International Airport in King County, Washington. All 38 people aboard escape the plane; seven of them are injured, and five of the seven later die of their injuries.
- April 13 – The Soviet Union cancels the Ilyushin Il-40 (NATO reporting name "Brawny") program.

=== May ===
- May 15 – The "Convent Crash" occurs when a Royal Canadian Air Force CF-100 Canuck fighter crashes into Villa St. Louis, a convent in Orleans, Ontario, Canada. The crash kills both members of the CF-100's crew and 13 people in the building.
- May 21 – A U.S. Air Force B-52 Stratofortress drops a 3.75-megaton hydrogen bomb on Bikini Atoll in the Central Pacific Ocean. It is the first air drop of a hydrogen bomb.
- May 23 – Piloted by Joseph A. Walker, the Douglas X-3 Stiletto makes its 51st and final flight.

=== June ===
- The first two United States Navy Grumman F11F-1 Tiger supersonic fighters fitted with the more powerful General Electric J79-GE-3A make their first flights. The new engine gives the F11F-1 a Mach 2 capability.
- June 1 – Colonial Airlines merges with Eastern Air Lines.
- June 2 – German-born American pilot Peter Gluckmann, dubbed "The Flying Watchmaker" by the press, takes off from San Francisco, California, to make a clockwise, seven-week, five-continent, 18,000-mile (29,000 km) solo flight in the Cessna 190 Businessliner City of San Francisco with a 240 hp (179 kW) engine, with stops in North America, Europe, the Middle East, Africa, and South America.
- June 20 – The U.S. Navy commissions its first helicopter carrier, USS Thetis Bay (CVE-90), redesignated CVHA-1 on July 1.
- June 24 – The BOAC Canadair C-4 Argonaut G-ALHE strikes a tree and crashes on departure from Kano Airport in Kano, Nigeria, killing 32 of the 45 people on board. Four of the 13 survivors are seriously injured.
- June 30 – A United Airlines Douglas DC-7 and a Trans World Airlines Lockheed Super Constellation collide in mid-air over the Grand Canyon in Arizona, USA, killing all 128 passengers and crew aboard both airplanes in the deadliest air disaster in history at the time; the crash triggers sweeping changes in the regulations governing cross-country flight over the United States, which would include the creation of the Federal Aviation Agency (FAA, later renamed Federal Aviation Administration).

=== July ===
- July 1 – The government of the Federation of Rhodesia and Nyasaland commissions Salisbury Airport – the future Harare International Airport – in Salisbury (now Harare). The airport's official opening will not take place until February 1957.
- July 9 – The No. 4 propeller of a Trans-Canada Air Lines Vickers Viscount 700 carrying 35 people tears loose from its engine over Flat Rock, Michigan, and strikes the plane's passenger cabin, killing one person and injuring five. The airliner lands safely at Windsor, Ontario, Canada. It is the first propeller loss on a turboprop aircraft and the first accident involving a Viscount.
- July 13 – Seven hijackers commandeer a Malev Hungarian Airlines Lisunov Li-2T (registration HA-LIG) with 20 people on board during a domestic flight in Hungary from Szombathely to Budapest and force it to fly to Ingolstadt Air Base in Manching, West Germany.
- July 15 – The United States Air Force establishes the Sixteenth Air Force. It operates from bases in Spain.
- July 20 – German-born American pilot Peter Gluckmann, dubbed "The Flying Watchmaker" by the press, returns to San Francisco, California, at the end of a 48-day, five-continent, 18,000-mile (29,000 km) solo flight in the Cessna 190 Businessliner City of San Francisco with a 240 hp (179 kW) engine. During the flight, he has made stops at several places in North America, including New York City; in Iceland at Keflavik; in the United Kingdom, including a 10-day stay in London; and in Switzerland; Italy; Greece; Israel; Egypt; Sierra Leone; Brazil; and the Caribbean, before again heading back to San Francisco across the United States. During the flight he has made his third crossing of the North Atlantic Ocean (all in light aircraft), made the first direct flight from Israel to Egypt, taking off from Lod Airport and landing at Cairo, and become the first pilot to make a solo flight across the South Atlantic Ocean in a light plane, flying 1,600 miles (2,600 km) from Freetown, Sierra Leone, to Natal, Brazil.
- July 27 – A United States Air Force B-47 Stratojet crashes into a storage igloo at RAF Lakenheath in the United Kingdom. The crash spreads burning fuel over three Mark 6 nuclear bombs in the igloo, one of which has an exposed detonator, but the fire does not a cause the exposed detonator to fire, and no nuclear material spreads into the environment.

=== August ===
- August 21 – Flying a Vought F8U-1 Crusader fighter, U.S. Navy Commander R. W. "Duke" Windsor sets a U.S. national speed record over a 15 km (9.3 mi) course, averaging 1,015.428 mph (1,634.173 km/h) at China Lake, California.
- August 22
  - A fighter aircraft of the 6th Regiment of the 2nd Fighter Division of the People's Republic of China's People's Liberation Army Air Force shoots down a Japan-based U.S. Navy P4M Mercator aircraft of Electronic Countermeasures Squadron One (VQ-1) while the Mercator is on a night reconnaissance mission over the Taiwan Strait, killing all 16 men aboard the Mercator. The Chinese claim the Mercator was flying in the airspace of Zhoushan.
  - The last passenger flight by a Martin JRM Mars flying boat is completed when U.S. Navy Lieutenant Commander Virgil Solomon lands the Marianas Mars at Alameda, California, at the end of a flight from Honolulu, Hawaii.
- August 23–24 – A United States Army H-21C Shawnee makes the first non-stop helicopter flight across the continental United States, flying 2,610 miles (4,200 km) from San Diego, California, to Washington, D.C.

=== September ===
- A U.S. Navy Convair R3Y-2 Tradewind flying boat sets a world record for the number of aircraft refueled in flight simultaneously, refueling four U.S. Navy Grumman F9F-8 Cougar fighters at the same time.
- September 7 – U.S. Air Force Captain Iven C. Kincheloe becomes the first pilot to climb above 100,000 feet, flying the Bell X-2 research aircraft to a new world altitude record of 126,200 feet (38,500 meters). He receives the MacKay Trophy for the flight.
- September 15 – The Tupolev Tu-104 jet airliner makes its first passenger flight, a domestic Aeroflot flight in the Soviet Union from Moscow's Vnukovo Airport to Omsk and then on to Irkutsk.
- September 20 – Piloting an ERCO Ercoupe, American professional baseball player Tom Gastall, a catcher for the Baltimore Orioles, dies when the plane crashes while he is attempting to make an emergency water landing in the Chesapeake Bay. His body will be found on September 25.
- September 21 – In an unusual incident during a test flight over Long Island Sound near Calverton, New York, a U.S. Navy Grumman F11F Tiger supersonic fighter is badly damaged after it fires its 20-millimeter guns, then is struck by the rounds it fired when it overruns them in flight during subsequent maneuvers. It crashes one-half mile (0.8 km) short of the runway at Naval Weapons Industrial Reserve Plant, Calverton, while attempting to return for an emergency landing; its pilot is injured, but survives.
- September 24 – The West German Air Force is formed in the Federal Republic of Germany (West Germany).
- September 27 – U.S. Air Force Captain Milburn Apt sets a new world air speed record in the Bell X-2, becoming the first person to exceed Mach 3, reaching a speed of Mach 3.2 – 2,454.4 mph (3,950.0 km/h) – before he loses control of the X-2 and dies in the resulting crash. His speed record will stand until 1961.
- September 28 – Deemed "surplus to requirements" by the U.S. Air Force's Air Materiel Command, the Douglas X-3 Stiletto supersonic research aircraft is retired and donated to the National Museum of the United States Air Force at Wright-Patterson Air Force Base, Ohio, where it will be put on display.

=== October ===
- October 1 – Chapter Two of the Experimental Aircraft Association is chartered in Fort Wayne, Indiana.
- October 10 – During a scheduled Military Air Transportation Service flight from RAF Lakenheath, England, to Lajes Field in the Azores, the United States Navy Douglas R6D-1 Liftmaster 131588 of Air Transport Squadron 6 (VR-6) disappears over the Atlantic Ocean about 369 miles (594 km) off Land's End, England. No trace of any of the 59 people on board is ever found.
- October 11 – A Vickers Valiant of the Royal Air Force's No. 49 Squadron drops the United Kingdom's first air-dropped atomic bomb, over Maralinga, South Australia.
- October 13 – Four men armed with machine guns wanting to be flown to the West attempt to commandeer a Malev Hungarian Airlines Lisunov Li-2 (registration HA-LID) with 19 people on board shortly after it takes off from Szombathely for a domestic flight in Hungary to Zalaegerszeg. Security personnel on the airliner foil the attempted hijacking, killing one of the men and badly wounding two of the other hijackers.
- October 16 – The Pan American World Airways Boeing 377 Stratocruiser 10-29 Clipper Sovereign of the Skies, operating as Flight 6, ditches in the Pacific Ocean northeast of the Hawaiian Islands after mechanical problems leave it with insufficient fuel to reach an airport. All 31 people aboard survive – with only a few suffering minor injuries – and are rescued by the United States Coast Guard Cutter USCGC Pontchartrain (WPG-70).
- October 29 – Operation Kadesh, an Israeli operation to occupy the Sinai Peninsula, begins with strikes by Israeli Air Force F-51 Mustangs against Egyptian forces and facilities throughout the Sinai and the parachute drop by Douglas DC-3s of a 395-man Israeli battalion near the Sinai's Mitla Pass, where French aircraft drop supplies to them by parachute. Four Israeli Mustangs severely disrupt Egyptian command and control in the Sinai by cutting all overhead telephone lines there with their wings and propellers. Israel begins the conflict with 155 combat aircraft, while Egypt has 255.
- October 29-November 1 – Egyptian Air Force de Havilland Vampires and Gloster Meteors escorted by MiG-15s attack Israeli ground forces in the Sinai, while Israeli Air Force Dassault Mystere IV fighters escort Israeli transport aircraft. The Israelis shoot down between seven and nine Egyptian aircraft in exchange for one of their own.
- October 31
  - A U.S. Navy R4D Skytrain is the first aircraft to land at the South Pole.
  - The United Kingdom and France begin Operation Musketeer, employing virtually all of their power projection capabilities in an attempt to seize the Suez Canal from Egypt during the Suez Crisis, closely coordinated with Israel's Operation Kadesh. The British commit 70 aircraft to the operation, while the French commit 45. The initial strikes against Egypt's Almaza airfield by Cyprus-based Royal Air Force English Electric Canberras overnight on October 31-November 1 are ineffective.

=== November ===
- November 1 – During the day, British Fleet Air Arm de Havilland Sea Venoms, Chance Vought Corsairs, and Hawker Sea Hawks from the aircraft carriers HMS Eagle, HMS Albion, and HMS Bulwark conduct a series of daylight strikes against Egyptian airbases, destroying over 200 aircraft – mostly on the ground – by nightfall and knocking the Egyptian Air Force out of action. It begins the first large-scale action by the Fleet Air Arm since the end of World War II in 1945. The Egyptian President Abdel Nasser orders Egyptian pilots to fly all surviving aircraft to southern Egypt and avoid further action against British, French, and Israeli forces.
- November 2 – After aerial reconnaissance reveals the destruction of the Egyptian Air Force, the British invasion force commander, General Sir Charles Keightley, orders British and French aircraft to begin a wide-ranging interdiction campaign against Egypt's military bases, infrastructure, and economy.
- November 3
  - F4U-7 Corsairs from the French aircraft carriers Arromanches and La Fayette bomb the aerodrome at Cairo.
  - Israeli jets mistakenly attack the British sloop HMS Crane in the Gulf of Aqaba, and Crane shoots one down in self-defense.
- November 4 – Israeli Air Force aircraft make a large strike against Egyptian positions at Sharm el-Sheikh, after which two Israeli Army brigades occupy the area.
- November 5 – The British and French bombing campaign against Egypt ends, with fixed-wing aircraft from the three British aircraft carriers alone having flown 1,300 sorties. Late in the day, the first British forces come ashore in Egypt as elements of the 3rd Battalion of the British Parachute Regiment land by parachute at El Gamil airfield and are reinforced by additional elements brought in by helicopter from the British aircraft carriers HMS Ocean and HMS Theseus.
- November 6 – The world's first ship-based helicopter-borne assault takes place, as helicopters from HMS Ocean and HMS Theseus land 425 men of the Royal Marines' 45 Commando and 23 tons of stores in Port Said, Egypt, in 90 minutes. During the day, over 1,000 French paratroopers jump into Egypt, and French Corsairs and F-84F Thunderstreaks provide close air support to French forces. A ceasefire ends hostilities between Egypt and the United Kingdom, France, and Israel in the evening, with the Israeli Air Force having flown 489 missions, mostly against ground targets, over the Sinai Peninsula. The last major operation by a British aircraft carrier force in history comes to an end.
- November 7 – The Norwegian airline Braathens SAFE has its first fatal accident when a de Havilland DH.114 Heron 2B crashes into the mountain Hummelfjell in Tolga Municipality, Norway, killing two of the 12 people on board. Among the survivors is Norwegian journalist and radio and television personality Rolf Kirkvaag, who suffers a broken foot; along with another passenger, he walks 18 km (11 mi) from the crash site to find help the following day.
- November 11 – The Convair XB-58 makes its first flight. It is the prototype of the world's first supersonic bomber, the Convair B-58 Hustler.
- November 24 – A Douglas DC-6 of Linee Aeree Italiane en route to New York crashes at takeoff near Paris-Le Bourget Airport, killing the crew of 10 and 25 passengers. Among the victims the world-famous orchestra director Guido Cantelli.
- November 27 – Linea Aeropostal Venezolana Flight 253, the Lockheed L-749A Constellation José Martí (registration YV-C-AMA), crashes at an altitude of 6,702 feet (2,043 meters) into the western peak of Silla de Caracas 18 kilometers (11 miles) east-southeast of Simón Bolívar International Airport in Caracas, Venezuela, while on descent to the airport, killing all 25 people on board. American professional baseball player Charlie Peete, an outfielder for the St. Louis Cardinals, flying to Venezuela with his family to play winter baseball in the Venezuelan Professional Baseball League, is among the dead.
- November 28 – The Ryan X-13 Vertijet makes its first transition from vertical to horizontal flight
- November 30 – The jet-propelled Martin MGM-1 Matador completes flight testing to become the U.S. Air Force's first operational surface-to-surface cruise missile.

=== December ===
- December 3 – Mackey Airlines acquires Midet Aviation.
- December 9 – Encountering icing and severe turbulence while flying over the mountains of British Columbia, Trans-Canada Air Lines Flight 810, a Canadair North Star, crashes into Mount Slesse, near Chilliwack, British Columbia, Canada, killing all 62 people on board. Among the dead are Canadian football players Cal Jones of the Winnipeg Blue Bombers and Mel Becket, Mario DeMarco, Gordon Sturtridge and Ray Syrnyk of the Saskatchewan Roughriders; DeMarco also is a former National Football League player. The airliner's wreckage will not be found until May 10, 1957.
- December 13 – The U.S. Federal Aviation Administration issues an airworthiness certificate to Aerocar International's Aerocar, a flying automobile.
- December 14 – Brazil becomes the first country in Latin America to acquire an aircraft carrier, purchasing HMS Vengeance from the United Kingdom. In 1960, she will become the second Latin American aircraft carrier to enter service, as Minas Gerais.
- December 16 – French aeronautical engineer and aircraft manufacturer René Couzinet kills his wife Gilberte (née Chazottes) – the widow of aviator Jean Mermoz – and commits suicide.

== First flights ==
- Stits SA-5 Flut-R-Bug

=== March ===
- March 12 – Brochet MB.110
- March 26 – Temco TT Pinto
- March 30 – Dale Weejet 800

=== April ===
- April 17 – SFECMAS Gerfaut II
- April 20 – SNCASE Durandal
- April 21 – Douglas F5D Skylancer
- April 23 – VZLU TOM-8
- April 24 – Douglas C-133 Cargomaster

=== May ===
- May 19 – Aerfer Sagittario 2
- May 26 – Sukhoi Su-9

=== June ===
- June 2 – Boisavia Anjou
- June 20 – Beriev Be-10 (NATO reporting name "Mallow")
- June 24 – Sukhoi T-405, prototype of the Sukhoi Su-9 (NATO reporting name "Fitter-B" and "Fishpot")

=== July ===
- July 20 – Aerotécnica AC-12
- July 23 – Dassault Étendard II
- July 24 – Dassault Étendard IV
- July 30 – Pasotti F.9 Sparviero

=== August ===
- August 1 – Aeritalia G.91
- August 2 - Wassmer Javelot
- August 6 – Beechcraft Travel Air
- August 11 – Cessna 620
- August 31 – Boeing KC-135 Stratotanker

=== September ===
- September 10 – North American YF-107, prototype of the North American F-107
- September 20 – Kingsford Smith PL.7

=== October ===
- October 6 – Bréguet 1050 Alizé
- October 22 – Bell XH-40 (Bell Model 204), prototype of the UH-1 Iroquois

=== November ===
- Hiller ROE Rotocycle
- November 11 – Convair XB-58, prototype of the B-58 Hustler, the world's first supersonic bomber.
- November 17 – Dassault Mirage III

=== December ===
- December 17 – Short SC.1
- December 17 – E-1 Tracer
- December 19 – Stroukoff YC-134
- December 26 – Convair YF-106A, prototype of the F-106 Delta Dart
- December 26 – Leduc 022

== Entered service ==
- Fairchild C-123 Provider

=== February ===
- February 24 – Gloster Javelin with No. 46 Squadron RAF

=== March ===
- March 31
  - Convair R3Y Tradewind with United States Navy Transport Squadron 2 (VR-2)
  - Douglas A3D Skywarrior with United States Navy Heavy Attack Squadron 1 (VAH-1)

=== April ===
- Convair F-102A Delta Dagger with the United States Air Force's 327th Fighter-Interceptor Squadron
- April 16 – Douglas F4D Skyray, the United States Navy's first supersonic fighter, with Composite Squadron 13 (VC-13)

=== June ===
- Cessna T-37 Tweet with the United States Air Force

=== July ===
- August 31 – Avro Vulcan with No. 83 Squadron RAF

=== September ===
- September 15 – Tupolev Tu-104, the Soviet Union's first jet airliner, with Aeroflot

=== October ===
- Saunders-Roe Skeeter with the British Army

=== December ===
- December 9 – C-130 Hercules with the United States Air Force 463rd Troop Carrier Wing

== Retirements ==
- North American YF-93, experimental variant of the North American F-86 Sabre, by the United States Air Force.
- March 25 – Martin XB-51 by the United States Air Force
- July – Martin PBM Mariner by Patrol Squadron 50 (VP-50), United States Navy
- September 28 – Douglas X-3 Stiletto, by the U.S. National Advisory Committee for Aeronautics (NACA) and the United States Air Force.

== Deadliest crash ==
The deadliest crash of this year was the 1956 Grand Canyon mid-air collision of 30 June, when a United Airlines Douglas DC-7 collided with a TWA Lockheed L-1049 Super Constellation over the Grand Canyon, Arizona, U.S., killing all 128 people aboard both aircraft. At the time, this was the deadliest accident in civil aviation history. It is also the deadliest civil aviation crash of the 1950s decade; the 1953 Tachikawa air disaster had killed 129 people but involved a military aircraft. The deadliest single-aircraft accident was Linea Aeropostal Venezolana Flight 253, a Lockheed L-1049 Super Constellation which crashed into the Atlantic Ocean off New Jersey, U.S. on 20 June, killing all 74 people on board.
