= Engraved on a Nation =

Engraved on a Nation is a Canadian sports documentary anthology series commissioned by TSN.

The series originally premiered in 2012, with an anthology of 8 documentaries surrounding the Canadian Football League and the Grey Cup, in honour of its centennial edition. In 2019, TSN revived the series with a new season of 6 documentaries beginning February 6, 2019, now focusing on notable figures and stories in all of Canadian sport.

== Episodes ==
=== Season 1 ===
No. overall	No. in series	Title	Directed by	Original release date	CAN viewers (millions)
1	1	The 13th Man	Larry Weinstein	October 8, 2012	
A profile of the Saskatchewan Roughriders, including their loyal fanbase, and their near-victory at the 97th Grey Cup in 2009—foiled by a late-game comeback by the Montreal Alouettes, and a penalty against the Riders that would cost them the game.
2	2	Stone Thrower: The Chuck Ealey Story	Charles Officer	October 12, 2012	
In his rookie season with the Hamilton Tiger-Cats, Chuck Ealey of Portsmouth, Ohio becomes the first player of African-American heritage to be part of a Grey Cup championship team.
3	3	The Kid From La Puente	Shelley Saywell	October 18, 2012	
After entering the CFL via its short-lived U.S. expansion, Anthony Calvillo helps the Montreal Alouettes win their first Grey Cup in 25 years.
4	4	Playing a Dangerous Game	John Walker	October 26, 2012	
Amidst the ongoing wave of terrorist attacks committed by the separatist group Front de libération du Québec (FLQ), the 57th Grey Cup is held in Montreal under high security. Meanwhile, Ottawa Rough Riders quarterback Russ Jackson attempts to secure a victory against the Saskatchewan Roughriders in his final game.
5	5	The Crash	Paul Cowan	November 2, 2012	
Edwin Harrison traces the aftermath of Trans-Canada Air Lines Flight 810, which killed his grandfather Cal Jones and four other players on their way back from the 1956 Shrine Game
6	6	The Photograph	Manfred Becker	November 9, 2012	
After winning the 30th Grey Cup, members of the Toronto RCAF Hurricanes depart to serve Canada in World War II.
7	7	Western Swagger	Barry Greenwald	November 16, 2012	
The Edmonton Eskimos establish a championship dynasty in the late 1970s, with five consecutive Grey Cup wins.
8	8	The Greatest Team That Never Won	Christie Callan-Jones	November 20, 2012	
In 1971, the Toronto Argonauts experience a major resurgence led by head coach Leo Cahill and rookie quarterback Joe Theismann, but fall short in their first Grey Cup appearance since 1952.

=== Season 2 ===
No. overall	No. in series	Title	Directed by	Original release date	CAN viewers (millions)
9	1	The Bailey Experience	Michael Hamilton	February 6, 2019	
In the shadow of a doping scandal that stripped Ben Johnson of his 1988 gold medal in the event, Donovan Bailey achieves international prominence after setting a new world record in the men's 100 metres at the 1996 Summer Olympics, and fights for the title of "world's fastest man" against U.S. sprinter Michael Johnson.
10	2	Man vs. Machine	Simon Ennis	February 11, 2019	
Despite a successful season where he became the first Canadian-born MVP in Major League Baseball history, Larry Walker loses the 1997 Lou Marsh Trophy for Canadian athlete of the year to Formula One driver Jacques Villeneuve (who won the drivers' championship that season), prompting him to question whether Villeneuve actually displayed any athleticism by driving.
11	3	The Impossible Swim	Larry and Ali Weinstein	February 27, 2019	
Maya Farrell attempts to swim across Lake Ontario.
12	4	The Northern Touch	Brent Hodge	March 12, 2019	
A profile of the fan and supporter culture of Toronto FC, the first Canadian franchise in Major League Soccer.
13	5	Omega Man: A Wrestling Love Story	Yung Chang	March 27, 2019	
Winnipeg-born wrestler Kenny Omega achieves international acclaim when he joins New Japan Pro-Wrestling.
14	6	On the Line	Juliet Lammers & Lorraine Price	April 3, 2019	
The Canada–United States women's national ice hockey rivalry.

== See also ==
- 30 for 30, a similar series of sports documentaries produced by TSN's minority partner ESPN.

== Sources ==
- Boone, Mike (2 June 2012). "Film offers unique perspective; Trudeau helped kick off 1969 Grey Cup game during the middle of Quebec's FLQ Crisis". Montreal Gazette.
- Edmonds, Scott (27 June 2012). "Tube stakes are higher in 100th Grey Cup year." Hamilton Spectator.
- Jones, Terry (16 August 2012). "Capturing the magic; Eskimos Western Swagger documentary part of eight-part CFL series that celebrates the 100th Grey Cup". Edmonton Sun.
- Lees, Nick (18 July 2012). "We all scream for ice cream". Edmonton Journal.
- MacKinnon, John. "Proud to be a team player". Edmonton Journal.
- Mitchell, Bob (8 May 2012). "Engraved on a Nation; A new series of docs celebrates the rich, 100-year history of the Grey Cup and its place in our national heritage". Toronto Star
- Mitchell, Bob (7 July 2012). "Ex-Argo Theisman still sore about '71". Toronto Star.
- Mitchell, Bob (8 July 2012). "The wrong turn that won't go away". Toronto Star.
- Mitchell, Bob (22 August 2012). "Stampeder's hike honours grandfather". Toronto Star.
- Odland, Kristen (27 September 2012). "Patience close to paying off for offensive lineman Harrison". Calgary Herald.
- Ralph, Dan (5 May 2012). "CFL will go deep with Grey Cup documentaries".Hamilton Spectator.
- Stinson, Scott (5 May 2012). "TSN, CFL hope project lights a torch".National Post.
- Vanstone, Rob (4 May 2012). "TSN unveils plans for CFL documentaries". Regina Leader-Post.
