= 1956 in Canadian football =

The Edmonton Eskimos faced the Montreal Alouettes in the Grey Cup game for the third consecutive year. And for the third consecutive year, the Edmonton Eskimos were Grey Cup champions. It was the first time in a Grey Cup that a touchdown was worth six points instead of five.

== Canadian Football News in 1956 ==
On Sunday, January 22, representatives of the two largest and most powerful leagues in the Canadian Rugby Union, the Interprovincial Rugby Football Union and the Western Interprovincial Football Union, met in Winnipeg and formed the Canadian Football Council as an umbrella organization. G. Sydney Halter, QC, was named as commissioner of the CFC, which would evolve into today's Canadian Football League. The CFC introduced a national negotiation list.

Television rights for Canadian football games were sold for $101,000. The touchdown point value was increased from five to six points.

The first East-West All-Star game was played at Vancouver's Empire Stadium on December 8. The day after the game, Trans-Canada Air Lines Flight 810 crashed into Mount Slesse, killing five players and one official who were on their way from Vancouver to Calgary. The five players who died in the crash included four members of the Saskatchewan Roughriders: offensive linemen Mario DeMarco and Ray Syrnyk, centre/tight end Mel Becket, and defensive lineman Gordon Sturtridge, along with Winnipeg Blue Bomber offensive lineman Cal Jones. The official killed in the crash was Ed Pettitt, of Calgary.

== Regular season ==
=== Final regular season standings ===
Note: GP = Games Played, W = Wins, L = Losses, T = Ties, PF = Points For, PA = Points Against, Pts = Points

**Western Interprovincial Football Union**
Team	GP	W	L	T	PF	PA	Pts
**Edmonton Eskimos**	16	11	5	0	358	235	22
**Saskatchewan Roughriders**	16	10	6	0	353	272	20
**Winnipeg Blue Bombers**	16	9	7	0	315	228	18
BC Lions	16	6	10	0	251	361	12
Calgary Stampeders	16	4	12	0	229	410	8

**Interprovincial Rugby Football Union**
Team	GP	W	L	T	PF	PA	Pts
**Montreal Alouettes**	14	10	4	0	478	361	20
**Hamilton Tiger-Cats**	14	7	7	0	383	385	14
**Ottawa Rough Riders**	14	7	7	0	326	359	14
Toronto Argonauts	14	4	10	0	331	413	8

**Ontario Rugby Football Union**
Team	GP	W	L	T	PF	PA	Pts
**Kitchener-Waterloo Dutchmen**	11	8	3	0	299	170	16
**Toronto Balmy Beach Beachers**	10	6	4	0	203	183	12
**Sarnia Golden Bears**	11	6	5	0	218	247	12
**London Lords**	10	3	7	0	124	177	6
X-Rochester Rockets	4	0	4	0	52	118	0

- Bold text means the team clinched a playoff berth.
- Edmonton and Montreal had first-round byes.
- X – Rochester withdrew from the league.

== Grey Cup playoffs ==
Note: All dates in 1956

=== Semifinals ===
WIFU semifinals – game 1
Winnipeg Blue Bombers @ Saskatchewan Roughriders
Date	Away	Home
November 3	Winnipeg Blue Bombers 7	Saskatchewan Roughriders 42

WIFU semifinals – game 2
Saskatchewan Roughriders @ Winnipeg Blue Bombers
Date	Away	Home
November 5	Saskatchewan Roughriders 8	Winnipeg Blue Bombers 19

- Saskatchewan won the total-point series 50–26. The Roughriders moved on to play the Edmonton Eskimos in the WIFU Finals.

IRFU semifinals
Ottawa Rough Riders @ Hamilton Tiger-Cats
Date	Away	Home
November 7	Ottawa Rough Riders 21	Hamilton Tiger-Cats 46

- The Tiger-Cats advanced to play the Montreal Alouettes in the IRFU Finals.

=== Finals ===
WIFU Finals – Game 1
Edmonton Eskimos @ Saskatchewan Roughriders
Date	Away	Home
November 10	Edmonton Eskimos 22	Saskatchewan Roughriders 23

WIFU Finals – Game 2
Saskatchewan Roughriders @ Edmonton Eskimos
Date	Away	Home
November 17	Saskatchewan Roughriders 12	Edmonton Eskimos 20

WIFU Finals – Game 3
Saskatchewan Roughriders @ Edmonton Eskimos
Date	Away	Home
November 19	Saskatchewan Roughriders 7	Edmonton Eskimos 51

- Edmonton won the best of three series 2–1 and advanced to the Grey Cup game.

IRFU Finals – Game 1
Montreal Alouettes @ Hamilton Tiger-Cats
Date	Away	Home
November 10	Montreal Alouettes 30	Hamilton Tiger-Cats 21

IRFU Finals – Game 2
Hamilton Tiger-Cats @ Montreal Alouettes
Date	Away	Home
November 19	Hamilton Tiger-Cats 41	Montreal Alouettes 48

- Montreal won the total-point series 78–62 and advanced to the Grey Cup game.

== Playoff bracket ==
Quarterfinals
IRFU	Montreal Alouettes
IRFU	BYE
EAST
IRFU	Hamilton Tiger Cats	46
IRFU	Ottawa Rough Riders	21
WIFU	Edmonton Eskimos
WIFU	BYE
WEST
WIFU	Saskatchewan Roughriders	42-8
WIFU	Winnipeg Blue Bombers	7-19

Semifinals
IRFU	Montreal Alouettes	30-48
IRFU	Hamilton Tiger Cats	21-41
WIFU	Edmonton Eskimos	22-20-51
WIFU	Saskatchewan Roughriders	23-12-7

Grey Cup
IRFU	Montreal Alouettes	27
WIFU	Edmonton Eskimos	50

== Grey Cup Championship ==
November 24 44th Annual Grey Cup Game: Varsity Stadium – Toronto, Ontario
WIFU Champion	IRFU Champion
Edmonton Eskimos 50	Montreal Alouettes 27
1956 Grey Cup Champions: Edmonton Eskimos

== Canadian Football Leaders ==
- CFL passing leaders
- CFL rushing leaders
- CFL receiving leaders

== 1956 Eastern (Interprovincial Rugby Football Union) All-Stars ==
=== Offence ===
- QB – Sam Etcheverry, Montreal Alouettes
- RB – Cookie Gilchrist, Hamilton Tiger-Cats
- RB – Pat Abbruzzi, Montreal Alouettes
- RB – Dick Shatto, Toronto Argonauts
- E – Hal Patterson, Montreal Alouettes
- E – Bobby Simpson, Ottawa Rough Riders
- FW – Joey Pal, Montreal Alouettes
- C – Tommy Hugo, Montreal Alouettes
- OG – Francis Machinsky, Toronto Argonauts
- OG – Larry Hayes, Ottawa Rough Riders
- OT – Kaye Vaughan, Ottawa Rough Riders
- OT – Bill Albright, Toronto Argonauts

=== Defence ===
- DT – Kaye Vaughan, Ottawa Rough Riders
- DT – Bill Albright, Toronto Argonauts
- DE – Pete Neumann, Hamilton Tiger-Cats
- DE – Jim Miller, Montreal Alouettes
- DG – Vince Scott, Hamilton Tiger-Cats
- MG – Hardiman Cureton, Toronto Argonauts
- LB – Tommy Hugo, Montreal Alouettes
- LB – Ken Vargo, Ottawa Rough Riders
- DB – Hal Patterson, Montreal Alouettes
- DB – Ralph Goldston, Hamilton Tiger-Cats
- DB – Ray Truant, Hamilton Tiger-Cats
- S – Don Pinney, Ottawa Rough Riders

== 1956 Western (Western Interprovincial Football Union) All-Stars ==
=== Offence ===
- QB – Jackie Parker, Edmonton Eskimos
- RB – Ken Carpenter, Saskatchewan Roughriders
- RB – Ed Vereb, British Columbia Lions
- RB – Normie Kwong, Edmonton Eskimos
- RB – Bob McNamara, Winnipeg Blue Bombers
- E – Don Edwards, British Columbia Lions
- E – Bud Grant, Winnipeg Blue Bombers
- C – Mel Becket, Saskatchewan Roughriders
- C – George Druxman, Winnipeg Blue Bombers
- OG – Harry Langford, Calgary Stampeders
- OG – Buddy Alliston, Winnipeg Blue Bombers
- OT – Martin Ruby, Saskatchewan Roughriders
- OT – Buddy Tinsley, Winnipeg Blue Bombers

=== Defence ===
- DT – Dick Huffman, Calgary Stampeders
- DT – Martin Ruby, Saskatchewan Roughriders
- DE – Frank Anderson, Edmonton Eskimos
- DE – Gord Sturtridge, Saskatchewan Roughriders
- MG – Ron Atchison, Saskatchewan Roughriders
- LB – John Wozniak, Saskatchewan Roughriders
- LB – Earl Lindley, Edmonton Eskimos
- LB – Bobby Marlow, Saskatchewan Roughriders
- LB – Ted Tully, Edmonton Eskimos
- DB – Rollie Miles, Edmonton Eskimos
- DB – Larry Isbell, Saskatchewan Roughriders
- S – Paul Cameron, British Columbia Lions

== 1956 Canadian Football Awards ==
- Most Outstanding Player Award – Hal Patterson (DB/OE), Montreal Alouettes
- Most Outstanding Canadian Award – Normie Kwong (RB), Edmonton Eskimos
- Most Outstanding Lineman Award – Kaye Vaughan (OT/DT), Ottawa Rough Riders
- Jeff Russel Memorial Trophy (IRFU MVP) – Hal Patterson (DB/OE), Montreal Alouettes
- Jeff Nicklin Memorial Trophy (WIFU MVP) - Jackie Parker (QB), Edmonton Eskimos
- Gruen Trophy (IRFU Rookie of the Year) - Tommy Grant (RB), Hamilton Tiger-Cats
- Dr. Beattie Martin Trophy (WIFU Rookie of the Year) - Norm Rauhaus (DB), Winnipeg Blue Bombers
- Imperial Oil Trophy (ORFU MVP) - ???
