= Linea Aeropostal Venezolana Flight 253 =

Linea Aeropostal Venezolana Flight 253 may refer to:

- Linea Aeropostal Venezolana Flight 253 (June 1956), an airliner that crashed in the Atlantic Ocean off New Jersey on 20 June 1956
- Linea Aeropostal Venezolana Flight 253 (November 1956), an airliner that crashed in Venezuela on 27 November 1956
