= Gordon Sturtridge (Canadian football) =

Canadian football player

No. 73
- Position: Defensive end

Personal information
- Born: 1929; Winnipeg, Manitoba, Canada
- Died: December 9, 1956 (aged 27); Mount Slesse, British Columbia, Canada

Career information
- High school: St. Paul's, Winnipeg, Manitoba
- CJFL: Winnipeg Rods

Career history
- 1949: Winnipeg Blue Bombers
- 1953–1956: Saskatchewan Roughriders

Awards and highlights
- Dr. Beattie Martin Trophy (1953); 3× CFL All-Star (1954, 1955, 1956); Saskatchewan Roughriders No. 73 retired

Gordon Henry Sturtridge (1929 – December 9, 1956) was a professional Canadian football player, and was one of 62 people who died on Trans-Canada Air Lines Flight 810, on December 9, 1956.

Sturtridge played his entire five-year professional football career as a defensive end for the Saskatchewan Roughriders of the Western Interprovincial Football Union, and his #73 jersey is one of eight that has been retired by the club.

== Amateur football career ==
Sturtridge played amateur Canadian football in the Canadian Junior Football League, and was a member of the Winnipeg Rods.

== Professional career ==
Sturtridge signed with the Saskatchewan Roughriders where he starred for four years. In 1953 he won the Dr. Beattie Martin Trophy as best Canadian rookie in the Western Conference (this despite having played with the Winnipeg Blue Bombers in 1949). He was a three-time Western All-Star (in 1954, 1955, and 1956), and was on his way back to Regina, Saskatchewan, on Trans-Canada Air Lines Flight 810 after playing in the Shrine Game in Vancouver, British Columbia, on December 8, 1956.

== Death ==
Sturtridge, his wife, Mildred (née Allford), Roughriders teammates, Mario DeMarco, Mel Becket, and Ray Syrnyk, were passengers on Flight 810 with another WIFU player, Calvin Jones, of the Winnipeg Blue Bombers. All five players were present at the 1956 All-Star game in Vancouver, British Columbia, and were headed back to their respective teams' home cities. The five players and Mildred were accompanied by 53 other passengers, and 3 crew members who all lost their lives in Western Canada's worst aviation disaster on December 9, 1956, on Slesse Mountain (Mount Slesse) near Chilliwack, British Columbia. The crash is the subject of the 2012 documentary The Crash of Flight 810, part of TSN's Engraved on a Nation series of eight documentaries celebrating the 100th Grey Cup.

Gordon and Mildred were survived by their three young children who were home in Regina at the time of the crash.

== Legacy ==
In 1957, a youth football league in North Vancouver, British Columbia was named in memory of Sturtridge. The Gordon Sturtridge Football League is for players aged 6 to 15.

== See also ==
- List of gridiron football players who died during their careers
