= Ray Syrnyk =

Canadian football player (1934–1956)

No. 56
- Position: Offensive lineman

Personal information
- Born: 1934; Saskatoon, Saskatchewan
- Died: December 9, 1956 (aged 21–22); Mount Slesse, British Columbia

Career information
- CJFL: Saskatoon Hilltops

Career history
- 1956: Saskatchewan Roughriders

Awards and highlights
- Saskatchewan Roughriders No. 56 retired

Raymond Nicholas Syrnyk (1934 – December 9, 1956) was a professional Canadian football player, and was one of 62 people who died on Trans-Canada Air Lines Flight 810.

Syrnyk played professionally for the Saskatchewan Roughriders as a rookie offensive lineman at the time of his death. Syrnyk's No. 56 jersey is one of eight that has been retired by the Roughriders.

== Amateur football and college career ==
Syrnyk played amateur Canadian football in the Canadian Junior Football League, and was a member of the 1953 Canadian Junior Football Championship Saskatoon Hilltops.

He was enrolled as a student at the University of Saskatchewan in Saskatoon at the time of his death.

== Professional career ==
Following junior league football, Syrnyk signed with the Saskatchewan Roughriders in 1956. He was on his way back to Regina on Flight 810 after watching teammates Mel Becket and Gordon Sturtridge play in the 1956 All-Star Game in Vancouver, British Columbia, on December 8, 1956.

== Death ==
Syrnyk, along with Roughriders teammates, Becket, Sturtridge, and Mario DeMarco, were passengers on Flight 810 with another pro football player, Calvin Jones, of the Winnipeg Blue Bombers. All five players were at the 1956 All-Star Game in Vancouver, and were headed back to their respective teams' home cities. The five players were accompanied by 54 other passengers and 3 crew members who all lost their lives in Western Canada's worst aviation disaster on December 9, 1956. The crash is the subject of the 2012 documentary The Crash, part of TSN's Engraved on a Nation series of eight documentaries celebrating the 100th Grey Cup.

== See also ==
- List of gridiron football players who died during their careers
