= Flight 253 =

Flight 253 may refer to:

- Linea Aeropostal Venezolana Flight 253 (June 1956), crashed in the Atlantic Ocean off New Jersey on 20 June 1956
- Braathens SAFE Flight 253, crashed in Tolga, Norway, on 7 November 1956
- Linea Aeropostal Venezolana Flight 253 (November 1956), crashed in Venezuela on 27 November 1956
- Seaboard World Airlines Flight 253A, Soviet-American airspace incident of 1 July 1968
- El Al Flight 253, terrorist attack perpetrated while departing from a layover in Athens, Greece, on 26 December 1968
- Northwest Airlines Flight 253, attempted terrorist bombing incident near Detroit, Michigan, on 25 December 2009
