= Edwin Harrison =

American gridiron football player and coach (born 1984)

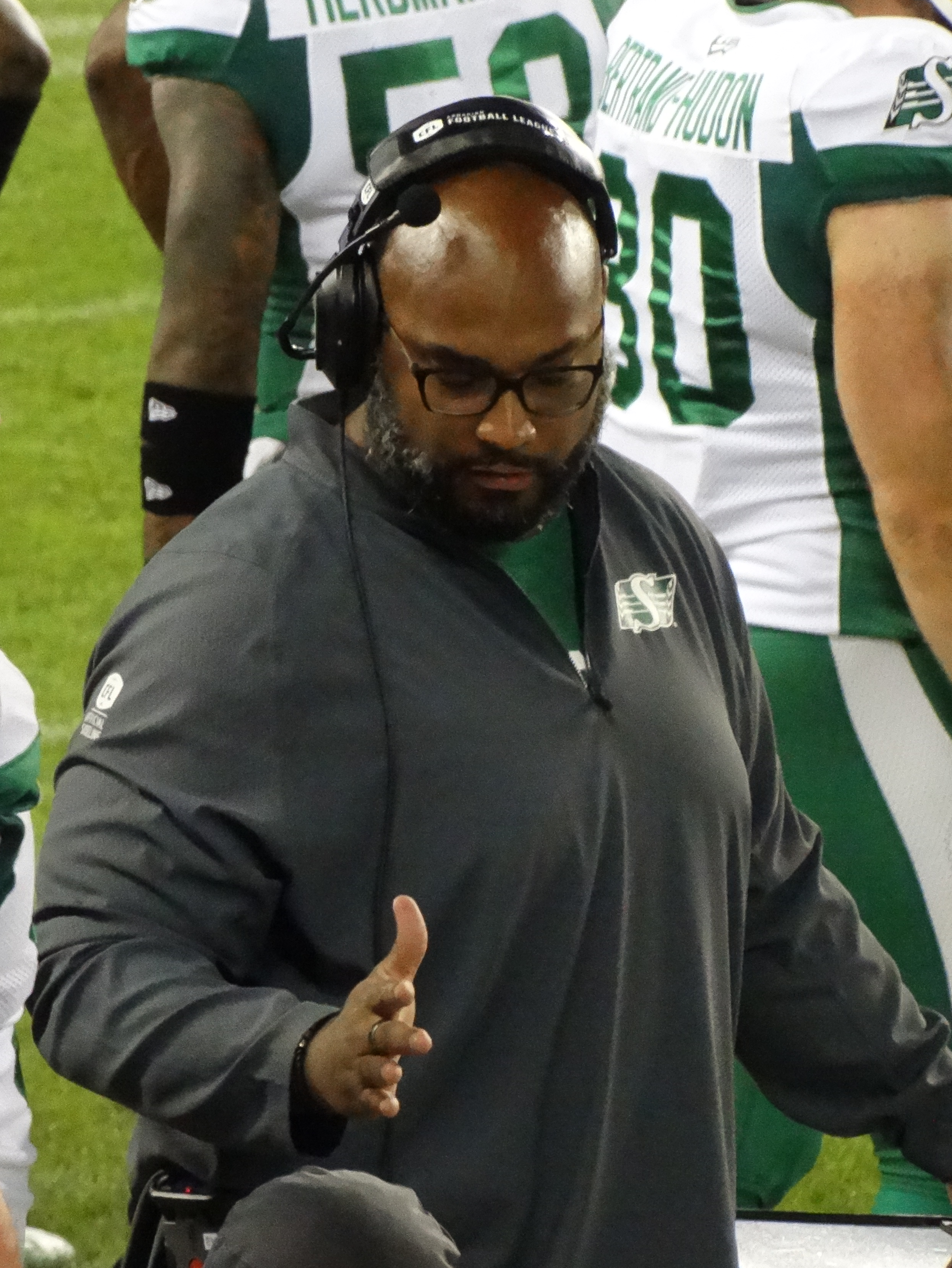
- Harrison with the Saskatchewan Roughriders in 2024

Saskatchewan Roughriders
- Title: Offensive line coach
- CFL status: American

Personal information
- Born: November 18, 1984 (age 41); Houston, Texas, U.S.
- Listed height: 6 ft 3 in (1.91 m)
- Listed weight: 314 lb (142 kg)

Career information
- High school: Houston (TX) Westbury
- College: Colorado
- NFL draft: 2008: undrafted

Career history

Playing
- Kansas City Chiefs (2008–2009)*; Calgary Stampeders (2010–2015)
- * Offseason or practice squad member only

Coaching
- Toronto Argonauts (2022–2023) Running backs and quality control coach; Saskatchewan Roughriders (2024–present) Offensive line coach

Awards and highlights
- Sporting News Freshman All-Big 12 (2004); 3× Grey Cup champion (2014, 2022, 2025)

Edwin Charles Harrison (born November 18, 1984) is the offensive line coach for the Saskatchewan Roughriders of the Canadian Football League (CFL). He is a former professional gridiron football guard who was a member of the Calgary Stampeders and the Kansas City Chiefs. He won a Grey Cup championship with the Stampeders in 2014. He played college football at Colorado.

== Playing career ==
=== Amateur ===
Harrison played four seasons at the University of Colorado. He made a total of 29 starts and was an honourable mention on the All-Big 12 team in 2007.

=== Professional ===
Pre-draft measurables
Height	Weight	40-yard dash	10-yard split	20-yard split	Vertical jump	Bench press
6 ft 3 1/4 in (1.91 m)	309 lb (140 kg)	5.47 s	1.90 s	3.10 s	28.5 in (0.72 m)	23 reps
All values from Pro Day

==== NFL ====
Harrison spent 2008 and part of 2009 on the Kansas City Chiefs practice roster.

==== CFL ====
On April 15, 2010, it was announced that Harrison had signed a contract with the Calgary Stampeders. That year, he was Calgary’s nominee for CFL rookie of the year after making 15 regular-season starts at right tackle.

In 2011, he played nine games after coming back from injury, playing the left tackle position. He also played in the team's West Semi-Final loss to Edmonton.

On March 7, 2012, it was announced that he had signed a contract extension with Calgary.

Harrison played with the Stampeders in 2013 and 2014, winning his first Grey Cup in 2014.

On February 11, 2015, it was announced that Harrison had signed a contract extension with the team. He began the season as the team’s starting left tackle but suffered a season-ending leg injury in Week 3.

On January 12, 2016, the Stampeders announced that they had released Harrison.

Harrison played 48 regular-season games over six seasons with the Stampeders. In his CFL career, he made starts at left tackle, right tackle, right guard and left guard.

== Coaching career ==
=== Amateur ===
From 2019 to 2021, Harrison was the assistant head coach and offensive line coach at Marshall High School in suburban Houston, Texas.

=== Toronto Argonauts ===
On January 19, 2022, it was announced that Harrison had joined the Toronto Argonauts as the team's running backs and quality control coach. He won the 109th Grey Cup in his first year with the team and was with the Argonauts for two years.

=== Saskatchewan Roughriders ===
On January 15, 2024, it was announced that Harrison had been named the offensive line coach for the Saskatchewan Roughriders.

== Personal life ==
Harrison is the grandson of former Outland Trophy winner and CFL offensive lineman Cal Jones, who was one of five players from the 1956 East-West All-Star Game killed when their Vancouver to Calgary plane, Trans-Canada Air Lines Flight 810, crashed into Slesse Mountain, killing all 62 people aboard. Harrison's search to learn more about the life and death of his grandfather and his family history is at the centre of the 2012 documentary The Crash of Flight 810, part of TSN's Engraved on a Nation series of eight documentaries celebrating the 100th Grey Cup.

Since retiring as a player and before joining the Argos, Harrison had been teaching geography at Marshall High School in suburban Houston, Texas.
