= Mel Becket =

American gridiron football player (1930–1956)

Profile
- Positions: Center, Tight end

Personal information
- Born: April 24, 1930; Chicago, Illinois, U.S.
- Died: December 9, 1956 (aged 26); Mount Slesse, British Columbia, Canada

Career information
- College: Indiana University

Career history
- 1952–1956: Saskatchewan Roughriders

Awards and highlights
- CFL All-Star (1956); Saskatchewan Roughriders No. 40 retired

Melvin Howard Becket (1930 – December 9, 1956) was an American college football and professional Canadian football player, and was one of 62 people who died on Trans-Canada Air Lines Flight 810, on December 9, 1956.

== Family ==
Melvin was born on 24 April 1930 in Chicago, Cook, Illinois, the son of Robert William Becket and Margaret Lydia Deahl.

== Career ==
Becket played his entire four-year professional football career as a tight end and center for the Saskatchewan Roughriders of the Western Interprovincial Football Union, and his No. 40 jersey is one of eight that has been retired by the club.

== College career ==
Becket played college football for the Indiana University Hoosiers from 1947 to 1951.

== Professional career ==
Following college, Becket was drafted 87th overall in the eighth round of the 1952 NFL draft by the Green Bay Packers. Becket spurned the NFL and instead signed with the WIFU Saskatchewan Roughriders, where he starred for four years. He was named a Western All-Star in 1956, and was on his way back to Regina, Saskatchewan, on Flight 810 after playing in the East–West All-Star game in Vancouver, British Columbia, on December 8, 1956.

== Death ==
Becket, along with Roughriders teammates, Mario DeMarco, Gordon Sturtridge, and Ray Syrnyk, were passengers on Flight 810 with another WIFU player, Calvin Jones, of the Winnipeg Blue Bombers. All five players were present at the 1956 All-Star game in Vancouver, British Columbia, and were headed back to their respective teams' home cities. The five players were accompanied by 54 other passengers, which included 1 football official, and 3 crew members, who all lost their lives in Western Canada's worst aviation disaster on December 9, 1956, on Slesse Mountain (Mount Slesse) near Chilliwack, British Columbia. The crash is the subject of the 2012 documentary The Crash, part of TSN's Engraved on a Nation series of eight documentaries celebrating the 100th Grey Cup.

== Legacy ==
Since 1957, in memory of Becket and his teammate Mario DeMarco, the DeMarco-Becket Memorial Trophy has been annually awarded to the most outstanding lineman in the CFL's West Division.

== See also ==
- List of gridiron football players who died during their careers
