= Mario DeMarco =

Canadian and American football player (1924–1956)

No. 52, 55, 63
- Position: Guard

Personal information
- Born: July 24, 1924; Boonton, New Jersey, U.S.
- Died: December 9, 1956 (aged 32); Mount Slesse, British Columbia, Canada
- Listed height: 5 ft 11 in (1.80 m)
- Listed weight: 220 lb (100 kg)

Career information
- College: Miami

Career history
- 1949: Detroit Lions
- 1951–1952: Edmonton Eskimos
- 1953–1956: Saskatchewan Roughriders

Awards and highlights
- 3× CFL All-Star (1951, 1952, 1954); Saskatchewan Roughriders No. 55 retired
- Stats at Pro Football Reference

Mario Joseph DeMarco (July 24, 1924 – December 9, 1956) was an American college football, National Football League (NFL), and professional Canadian football player, and was one of 62 people who died on Trans-Canada Air Lines Flight 810, on December 9, 1956.

Raised in Boonton, New Jersey, DeMarco started at offensive lineman for four seasons at Boonton High School before graduating in 1945. In 1996, he was a member of the inaugural class of inductees into the school's hall of fame.

DeMarco played professionally as an offensive lineman for the NFL's Detroit Lions in 1949, before joining the Edmonton Eskimos of the Western Interprovincial Football Union for two seasons beginning in 1951. DeMarco joined the Saskatchewan Roughriders in 1953, and was a member of the team for four years until the time of his death. He was a three time West All-Star (in 1951, 1952 and 1954). DeMarco's #55 jersey is one of eight that has been retired by the Roughriders.

== College career ==
DeMarco played collegiately for the University of Miami Hurricanes from 1945 to 1949.

== Professional career ==
Following college, DeMarco signed with the NFL Detroit Lions, playing one season in 1949 and one season with the New York Giants. In 1951, DeMarco joined the WIFU Edmonton Eskimos, where he played for two years. DeMarco joined the Saskatchewan Roughriders in 1952, and played with them until his death. He was a West All-Star in 1951, 1952 and 1954, and was on his way back to Regina, Saskatchewan, on Flight 810 after watching teammates Mel Becket and Gordon Sturtridge play in the 1956 East–West All-Star game in Vancouver, British Columbia, on December 8, 1956.

== Death ==
DeMarco, along with Roughriders teammates, Becket, Sturtridge, and Ray Syrnyk, were passengers on Trans-Canada Air Lines Flight 810 with another CFL player, Calvin Jones, of the Winnipeg Blue Bombers. All five players were present at the 1956 East–West All-Star game in Vancouver, British Columbia, and were headed back to their respective teams' home cities. The five players were accompanied by 54 other passengers, and 3 crew members who all lost their lives in Western Canada's worst aviation disaster on December 9, 1956. The crash is the subject of the 2012 documentary The Crash of Flight 810, part of TSN's Engraved on a Nation series of eight documentaries celebrating the 100th Grey Cup.

== Legacy ==
Since 1957, in memory of DeMarco and his teammate Mel Becket, the WIFU and its successor, the Canadian Football League, have annually awarded the DeMarco-Becket Memorial Trophy to the most outstanding lineman in the West Division.

== See also ==
- List of gridiron football players who died during their careers

== Sources ==
- Pro-Football Reference.com Profile – Mario DeMarco
- CFL Facts & Figures. 2009 Edition. All-Time Division All-Star List on page 227.
