= Jim Shipka =

Canadian football player (born c. 1935)

Profile
- Positions: Halfback, Fullback

Personal information
- Born: c. 1935 (age 90–91); Edmonton, Alberta
- Died: October 26,2025; Edmonton Alberta
- Listed height: 5 ft 10 in (1.78 m)
- Listed weight: 195 lb (88 kg)

Career information
- University: Alberta

Career history
- 1956–1963: Edmonton Eskimos

Awards and highlights
- Grey Cup champion (1956)

Jim Shipka (born c. 1935) was a Canadian professional football player who played for the Edmonton Eskimos. He won the Grey Cup with the Eskimos in 1956. He previously played football for the University of Alberta Golden Bears while he attended the university (Faculty of Engineering).
