= Elfrida Pigou =

Canadian mountain climber

Elfrida Mary Pigou (February 28, 1911 – July 30, 1960) was a prominent Canadian mountaineer and pioneer with many first ascents to her credit. She was born in Vernon, British Columbia, the daughter of Meynell Henry Pigou and his wife Lilian Maud Mackenzie and spent her childhood in the Okanagan region of British Columbia. She graduated with a Bachelor of Arts from the University of British Columbia in 1931. In 1949 she began a climbing career in the mountainous regions of BC and Washington state that made her perhaps the most distinguished female climber of her generation in Canada.

Pigou became a member of the Alpine Club of Canada in 1948, and this served as her introduction to the world of mountains climbing. Over the next several years she made ascents of many of the tallest mountains in BC, including Mount Raleigh, Mount Gilbert, Homathko Peak and Mount Essex. She also did several rock climbing first ascents in The Bugaboos, some with Fred Beckey. She also volunteered for the Mountain Rescue Group which at that time was under the Alpine Club's jurisdiction.

On May 12, 1957, while on a spring ascent of Mount Slesse near Chilliwack, British Columbia with Geoffery Walker and David Cathcart she discovered the wreckage of TCA Flight 810 which had gone missing in December 1956. Pigou and several local mountaineers, including Paddy Sherman and "Fips" Broda had surmised that Slesse was the most likely site of the crash of flight 810.

On July 30, 1960, while on an attempt to ascend Mount Waddington, she and climbers Joan Stirling, John Owen and Derrick Boddy went missing. Two days later a party from Seattle came across the site of their camp on the Bravo Glacier which had been obliterated by a large ice and snow avalanche 140 metres wide and at least 3 metres deep. The bodies of all four climbers were left in place, and a memorial was erected nearby on the south shoulder of Mount Jeffery by the Alpine Club.

On March 28, 1967, Mount Elfrida was named in her honour.

== First ascents ==
This is a partial list of first ascents

- Mount Larrabee Washington State, first winter ascent 1958
- Mount Cradock, 1953
- Mount Gilbert 1954
- Mount Essex 1955
- Homathko Peak 1955
- Chimney Rock 1957
- Mount Poland 1958
- Tombstone Tower 1958
- Cloudcap Peak, Washington State, Center-West route, 1960

== See also ==
- Mount Slesse
- Mount Elfrida
- Pigou
