= Larry Hayes (American football) =

American football player (1935–2017)

Profile
- Position: Linebacker

Personal information
- Born: July 21, 1935; Old Hickory, Tennessee, U.S.
- Died: June 15, 2017 (aged 81); Nashville, Tennessee, U.S.
- Listed height: 6 ft 3 in (1.91 m)
- Listed weight: 220 lb (100 kg)

Career information
- College: Vanderbilt

Career history
- 1956–1960: Ottawa Rough Riders
- 1961: New York Giants
- 1962–1963: Los Angeles Rams

Awards and highlights
- Grey Cup champion (1960); CFL East All-Star (1959)
- Stats at Pro Football Reference

Larry Gene Hayes Sr. (July 21, 1935 – June 15, 2017) was an American professional football player who was a linebacker for the New York Giants and Los Angeles Rams.
