= Pigou =

Pigou is the surname of the following notable people:

- Arthur Cecil Pigou (1877–1959), English economist
- Elfrida Pigou (1911–1960), Canadian mountaineer
- Francis Pigou (1832–1916), dean of Bristol

== See also ==
- Pigou Club and Pigouvian tax, both derived from the name of the English economist Arthur Cecil Pigou
