= Bill Albright =

American gridiron football player (1929–2013)

No. 75, 51, 53
- Positions: Guard, tackle, defensive tackle

Personal information
- Born: April 4, 1929; Racine, Wisconsin, U.S.
- Died: January 17, 2013 (aged 83); Spooner, Wisconsin, U.S.
- Listed height: 6 ft 1 in (1.85 m)
- Listed weight: 233 lb (106 kg)

Career information
- High school: William Horlick (Racine)
- College: Wisconsin (1947–1950)
- NFL draft: 1951: 20th round, 242nd overall pick

Career history
- New York Giants (1951–1954); Toronto Argonauts (1955-1957); Montreal Alouettes (1958)

Awards and highlights
- 2× IRFU All-Star (1955, 1956)

Career NFL statistics
- Games played: 47
- Games started: 43
- Fumble recoveries: 8
- Stats at Pro Football Reference

William Charles Albright (April 4, 1929 – January 17, 2013) was an all-star lineman who played in the Interprovincial Rugby Football Union (IRFU) and National Football League (NFL).

Albright played college football at the University of Wisconsin-Madison. He was drafted in the twentieth round of the 1951 NFL draft by the New York Giants and played four seasons (47 games) with the team. Most notably, he scored 1 touchdown on a fumble return.

He finished his career in the CFL. Playing 3 seasons with the Toronto Argonauts he was an all-star 3 times; twice in 1956, for both offensive and defensive line. He played one game for the Montreal Alouettes in 1958.
