= Don Pinhey =

American gridiron football player and coach (1930–2014)

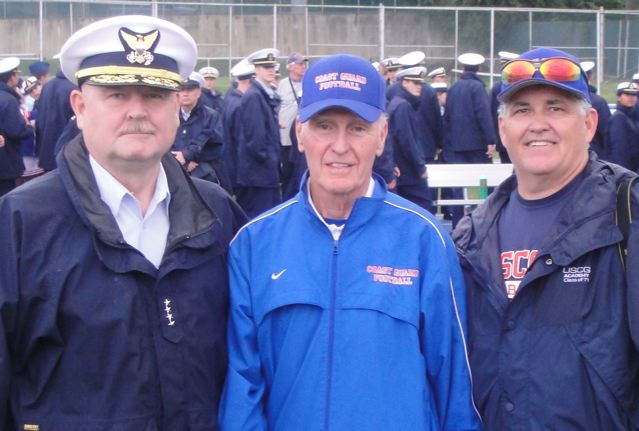

Profile
- Position: Linebacker

Personal information
- Born: December 20, 1930; Ohio, U.S.
- Died: November 13, 2014 (aged 83); New London, Connecticut, U.S.
- Listed height: 5 ft 10 in (1.78 m)
- Listed weight: 180 lb (82 kg)

Career information
- College: Muskingum

Career history
- 1954–1958: Ottawa Rough Riders

Donald Charles Pinhey (December 20, 1930 – November 13, 2014) was an American gridiron football player and coach of football and baseball. He played professionally for the Ottawa Rough Riders of the Canadian Football League (CFL). He was named an all-star for the 1956 CFL season. Pinhey played college football at Muskingum University. Pinhey served as the head football coach at Dakota Wesleyan University in Mitchell, South Dakotafrom 1959 to 1962 and at Wilmington College in Wilmington, Ohio from 1963 to 1966, compiling a career college football coaching record of 17–44–3. He was the head baseball coach at the United States Coast Guard Academy in New London, Connecticut from 1968 to 1999, amassing a record of 357–476–5.

== Head coaching record ==
=== Football ===
Year	Team	Overall	Conference	Standing	Bowl/playoffs
Dakota Wesleyan Tigers (South Dakota Intercollegiate Conference) (1959–1962)
1959	Dakota Wesleyan	3–5–1	3–4–1	5th	
1960	Dakota Wesleyan	4–5	3–3	T–4th	
1961	Dakota Wesleyan	2–7	2–4	T–4th	
1962	Dakota Wesleyan	2–7	0–6	7th	
Dakota Wesleyan:		11–22–1	8–17–1		
Wilmington Quakers (Mid-Ohio Conference) (1963–1966)
1963	Wilmington	3–5	1–3	T–3rd	
1964	Wilmington	2–5–1	0–3	4th	
1965	Wilmington	0–7–1	0–3	4th	
1966	Wilmington	1–7	0–2	4th	
Wilmington:		6–22–2	1–11		
Total:		17–44–3			
