= Charlie Peete =

American baseball player (1929–1956)

- Center fielder
- Born: February 22, 1929; Franklin, Virginia, U.S.
- Died: November 27, 1956 (aged 27); Caracas, Venezuela
- Batted: Left Threw: Right

Professional debut
- NgL: 1950, for the Indianapolis Clowns
- MLB: July 17, 1956, for the St. Louis Cardinals

Last MLB appearance
- August 16, 1956, for the St. Louis Cardinals

MLB statistics
- Batting average: .192
- Home runs: 0
- Runs batted in: 6
- Stats at Baseball Reference

Teams
- Negro leagues: Indianapolis Clowns (1950); Major League Baseball: St. Louis Cardinals (1956)

Charles Peete (February 22, 1929 – November 27, 1956) was an American professional baseball player. The reigning 1956 batting champion of the Triple-A American Association, who received a one-month, 23-game trial with the 1956 St. Louis Cardinals of Major League Baseball, Peete was projected by some as the leading candidate to be the Cardinals' 1957 starting center fielder, but he was killed in a commercial airplane crash near the Caracas airport in Venezuela while flying to his winter-league baseball team in late November 1956. Peete's wife, Nettie, and their three young children were also among the 25 victims of the crash. Despite his premature death, Peete played a key role in the integration of professional baseball during the American civil rights movement and was among the first Black players in the history of the Cardinals organization. He is also believed to be the first active MLB player to have died in a commercial plane crash.

== Early career ==
Nicknamed "Mule", Peete stood 5 feet 9 inches (1.75 m) tall, weighed 190 pounds (86 kg), batted left-handed and threw right-handed. The native of Franklin, Virginia, began his professional career in the Negro leagues with the Indianapolis Clowns and played semi-professional baseball in Canada.

Peete was drafted by the Army in 1952 during the Korean War. He served in Asia mainly with the Special Services Division playing football and baseball. He was honorably discharged in 1953 after 15 months of service.

After his discharge, Peete signed with the unaffiliated Portsmouth, Virginia, Merrimacs of the mid-level, Class B Piedmont League; Peete was the first African-American to play in that league since the baseball color line was broken in 1946. He batted .275 in 125 games played for Portsmouth in 1953, and then in 1954 batted .311 with 17 home runs and was named to the PL all-star team.

After the St. Louis Cardinals drafted him in late 1954, Peete was promoted through two levels to Triple-A for 1955 and batted .310 in a season split between the Cardinals' two top farm teams, the Rochester Red Wings and Omaha Cardinals. In 1956, he batted a league-best .350 with 16 home runs and 63 runs batted in in 116 games for Omaha.

== St. Louis Cardinals ==
Called up by the Cardinals in July, Peete made his debut July 17 in a home game against the Pittsburgh Pirates. Pinch hitting for veteran Hank Sauer, he drew a walk and stayed in the game to play center field, and later grounded into a double play in a 4–2 Cardinal loss. Peete collected ten hits in 52 at bats with two doubles and two triples. He was sent back to Omaha after his last MLB appearance, August 16, when he went hitless in three at bats against Lew Burdette of the Milwaukee Braves.

== Plane crash in Venezuela ==
Despite the disappointing results from his midseason callup, Peete was projected as a prime candidate for the Redbirds' 1957 center fielder job; incumbent Bobby Del Greco had batted only .215 during 1956. Had Peete won the job, he would have been the Cardinals' first African-American regular starting player. To gain more experience, Peete decided to play winter baseball, and after drawing his release from a Cuban team because of a slow start, he joined the Valencia club in the Venezuelan league. Peete was headed to join the league when he died at age 27; he and his family were on board Linea Aeropostal Flight 253 when the airliner crashed into Avila Mountain, near Caracas, during a rainstorm.

He became the first Major League Baseball player to die in Venezuela.

== See also ==
- List of Negro league baseball players who played in Major League Baseball
- List of baseball players who died during their careers
