= George Druxman =

Canadian football player (1929–1999)

Profile
- Position: Halfback

Personal information
- Born: December 4, 1929; Winnipeg, Manitoba, Canada
- Died: July 2, 1999 (aged 69); Winnipeg, Manitoba, Canada
- Listed height: 6 ft 1 in (1.85 m)
- Listed weight: 195 lb (88 kg)

Career history
- 1953–1963: Winnipeg Blue Bombers

Awards and highlights
- 4× Grey Cup champion (1958, 1959, 1961, 1962)

George Druxman (December 4, 1929 – July 2, 1999) was a Canadian professional football player who played for the Winnipeg Blue Bombers. He won the Grey Cup with Winnipeg in 1958, 1959, 1961 and 1962. He played college football at the University of Portland. After his football career he was a hotelier. Druxman died in 1999.
