= Linea Aeropostal Venezolana Flight 253 (June 1956) =

1956 passenger plane crash in Asbury Park, New Jersey, United States

Coordinates: 40.225°N 73.712°W

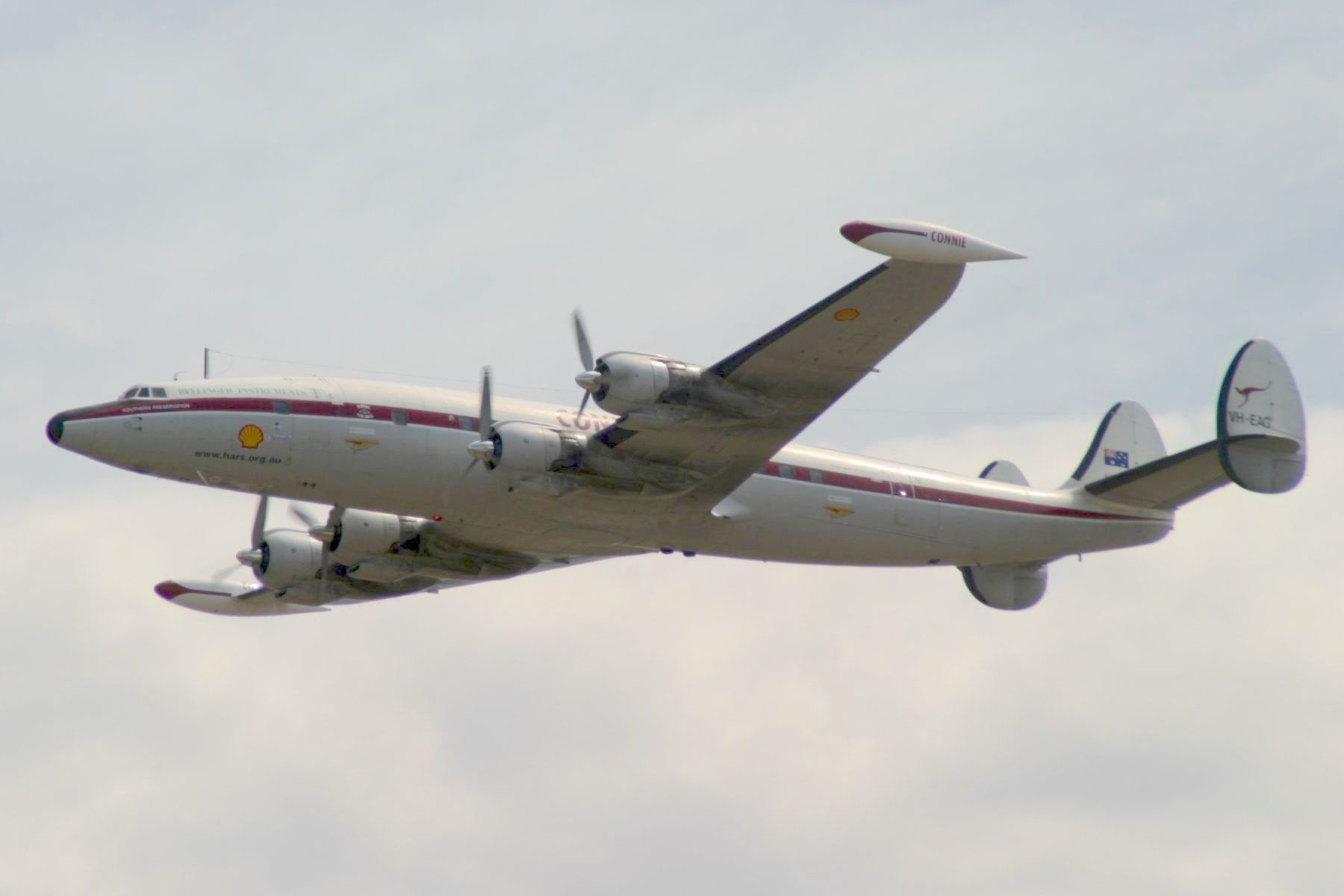
- A Super Constellation similar to the accident aircraft

Accident
- Date: June 20, 1956
- Summary: Loss of control after fire
- Site: Atlantic Ocean, off New Jersey, United States

Aircraft
- Aircraft type: Lockheed L-1049E Super Constellation
- Operator: Linea Aeropostal Venezolana
- Registration: YV-C-AMS
- Flight origin: New York-Idlewild International Airport (IDL/KIDL)
- Destination: Caracas Airport (CCS/SVMI)
- Passengers: 64
- Crew: 10
- Fatalities: 74
- Survivors: 0

Linea Aeropostal Venezolana Flight 253 was a regularly scheduled passenger flight from Idlewild International Airport, New York to Caracas International Airport in Caracas, Venezuela. During the 20 June 1956 operation of the flight, approximately one hour and twenty minutes after departure, the flight crew reported trouble with one of the engines and turned back to New York. While dumping fuel in preparation for landing, the airplane, a Lockheed L-1049 Super Constellation, caught fire and plummeted into the Atlantic Ocean off Asbury Park, New Jersey. All 74 aboard were killed; at the time, it was the world's deadliest disaster involving a scheduled commercial flight. However, its death toll would be surpassed only ten days later.

== The flight ==
The accident aircraft was a Lockheed L-1049 Super Constellation, registration YV-C-AMS, and named Rafael Urdaneta, under the command of Captain Luis F. Plata. The plane departed New York at approximately 11:15 p.m. on June 19. At 12:20 a.m. on June 20, some 250 miles east of Norfolk, Virginia, Captain Plata reported that the #2 propeller— the inboard propeller on the port (left) wing— was overspeeding, and radioed his intent to return to Idlewild. Twenty minutes later, the crew declared an emergency, stating that they had been unable to feather the #2 propeller. An Eastern Airlines flight under the command of Captain Charles Fisher, bound from New York to San Juan, diverted to monitor the situation and assist in relaying communications, while a U.S. Coast Guard aircraft piloted by Lieutenant Commander Frederick Hancox was dispatched to escort the stricken airliner back to New York.

By 1:25 a.m., the Super Constellation, with its escorts in tow, was off the coast of New Jersey and beginning its descent into New York. Captain Plata requested and received permission to dump fuel, and began doing so at 1:29. Almost immediately, the crews of both escort aircraft observed the streaming fuel catch fire and erupt in a large fireball. The airliner swerved violently to the right, nosed over, and plunged into the sea, exploding on impact. Commander Hancox reported its rate of descent at 4,000 feet per minute, and that it was in a 90-degree bank at the moment of impact. Captain Fisher described the descent of the blazing aircraft as like "a falling star."

The accident occurred 32 miles east of Asbury Park, New Jersey. The Coast Guard plane circled the flaming wreckage, but could see no signs of life- only aircraft debris, along with pieces of clothing and personal effects. The Navy transport Lt. Robert Craig, the first surface ship to arrive, was on scene at 3:43 a.m. and radioed: "Found no survivors. Expect to find none." Crews dispatched from the Craig in lifeboats recovered only fragments of bodies along with sundry debris. By dawn, any wreckage not recovered had sunk in 120 feet of water.

== Investigation and aftermath ==
The debris and remains recovered the night of the crash provided no clues as to the origin of the sudden fire; initial speculation was that fuel vapor may have come into contact with hot exhaust gases from one or more engines. Locating the main wreckage proved difficult due to the relatively wide dispersion of the debris- Hancox had observed the airliner shed flaming parts during its descent, and the final impact and explosion were described as violent, strewing debris over a considerable area. U.S. Navy salvage teams dragged grappling lines across the site for several days without success. Finally, a June 30 sonar search provided tentative identification of the main wreckage, which the Navy estimated would require "days or weeks" to raise. Minimal progress was made over the ensuing week, largely due to bad weather; On July 6, the Venezuelan government requested that recovery operations be halted.

The investigation spent considerable time analyzing the events of the fuel dump in order to identify the likeliest source of the ignition. Hancox reported that as soon as Captain Plata commenced dumping fuel, Hancox observed sparks and flame in the vicinity of the #3 engine, the inboard engine on the starboard (right) wing, opposite the engine with the propeller problem. The investigative board concluded that the vibration induced by the runaway #2 propeller had caused internal structural damage to the starboard wing behind the #3 engine, between the fuel tank and fuel dump chute, as this area would have been the symmetrical point of the vibration. The board considered this the most probable cause, but stated that it was unable to determine this with certainty.

Ruth Noel, widow of passenger Marshal L. Noel, subsequently sought damages from both the airline and United Aircraft (owners of Hamilton Standard, the manufacturer of the failed propeller). In the course of the litigation, evidence was introduced that within moments of the fuel dump commencing, the faulty #2 propeller broke free of its mountings and slashed into the fuselage. The double seat in the area of the impact was apparently ejected from the aircraft at this time, as it was found some distance from the spot where YV-C-AMS crashed; it had been cut in half from top to bottom by a heavy object. The bodies of its two occupants were among the few recovered from the scene; both had suffered leg amputations. Expert testimony provided two possible scenarios for ignition of the jettisoning fuel:

- When the #2 propeller separated, the airstream blew sparks from its broken hub or shaft backwards into the plume of fuel;
- When the #2 propeller slashed downward through the fuselage, it sliced through the cabin floor into the #5 fuel tank (center tank), immediately igniting the fuel within. The flames blew out of the fuselage into the fuel plume.

In May 1959, propeller pitch-lock mechanisms, designed to arrest the pitch of the blades and prevent them from opening further when an overspeed is imminent, became mandatory on U.S. piston-engined transport aircraft.

== Second crash ==
Six months later, another operation of Flight 253 ended in tragedy when it crashed into a mountain on approach to Caracas. All 25 aboard were killed.
