= Linea Aeropostal Venezolana Flight 253 (November 1956) =

1956 aviation accident

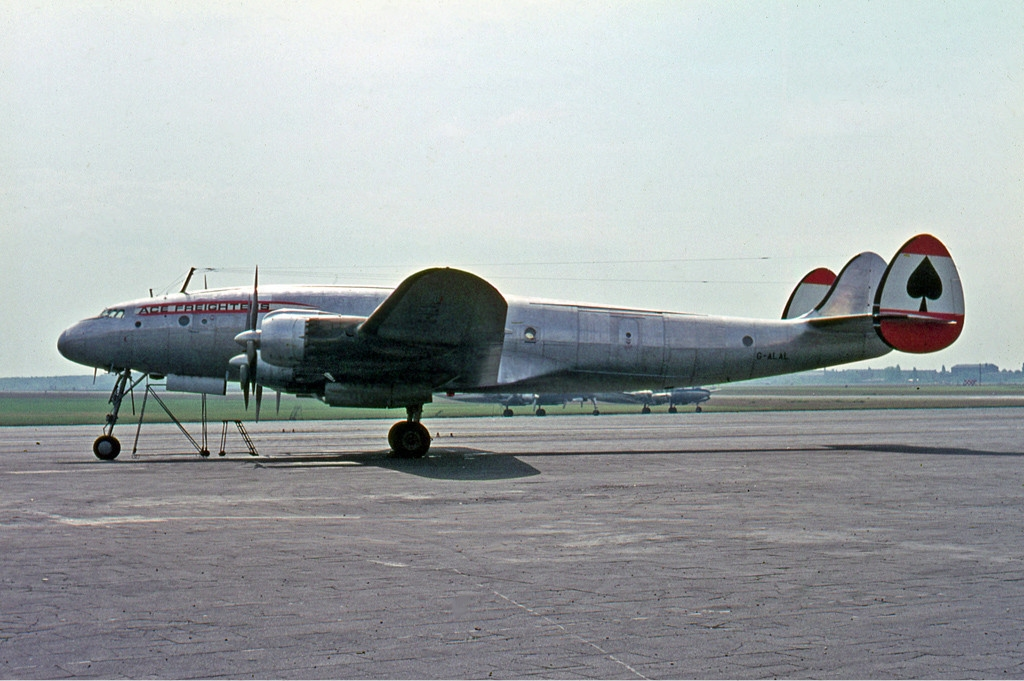
- An L-749 Constellation similar to the accident aircraft

Accident
- Date: November 27, 1956
- Summary: Controlled flight into terrain
- Site: 18 km (11.3 mls) ESE of Caracas Airport, Venezuela

Aircraft
- Aircraft type: Lockheed L-749 Constellation
- Aircraft name: Jose Marti
- Operator: Aeropostal Alas de Venezuela
- Registration: YV-C-AMA
- Flight origin: New York-Idlewild International Airport (IDL/KIDL)
- Destination: Caracas Airport (CCS/SVMI)
- Occupants: 25
- Passengers: 18
- Crew: 7
- Fatalities: 25
- Survivors: 0

Linea Aeropostal Venezolana Flight 253 was a regularly scheduled passenger flight from Idlewild International Airport, New York to Caracas International Airport in Caracas, Venezuela. During the November 27, 1956 operation of the flight, by a Lockheed L-749 Constellation, registration YV-C-AMA and named Jose Marti, the aircraft, piloted by French captain Marcel Combalbert, crashed into a mountain near Caracas, Venezuela. All 25 passengers and crew on board were killed. This occurred just five months after another operation of this flight, with a Lockheed L-1049 Super Constellation, ended with a fatal crash as well.

== Crash ==
Flight 253 was flying through a rainstorm as it approached Caracas Airport. It was approximately 18 kilometers from the runway when the aircraft struck the southern ridge of Cerro El Ávila at an altitude of 6700 feet.

Ten Americans were among those killed in the crash. St. Louis Cardinals outfielder Charlie Peete, his wife, and their three small children were among the victims. Peete was traveling to Venezuela in order to play winter ball there.

== Aftermath and cause ==
Cable cars were used in the recovery of bodies.

The probable cause of the crash was described thus: "The instrument flight training manuals show that the Linea Aeropostal Venezolana has approved a procedure for entering Maiquetia in semi-IFR conditions. This procedure consists (of) maintaining a minimum flight level of 10,000 feet as far as the station (Miq 292.5), then turning north over this point and continuing on a 360º heading for 4 minutes, followed by a standard let-down to 1,200 feet above sea level until contact is established, and a return to the aerodrome under VFR. It is obvious that the pilot-in-command did not fully comply with this procedure, and, after accumulating errors in estimating his speed, endeavoured to make a direct approach which proved fatal because his altitude at the time of his last report was insufficient to cross the Avila mountain range, against which the impact occurred."
