= Cal Jones =

American gridiron football player (1933–1956)

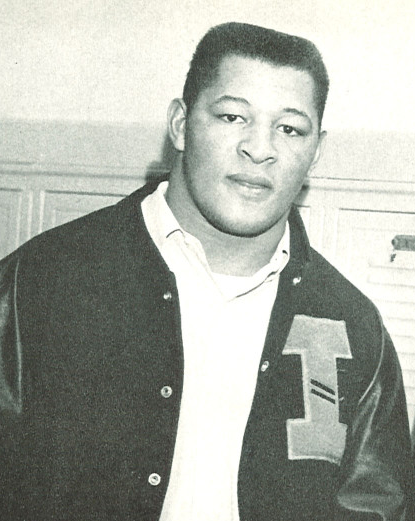
- Jones from 1956 Hawkeyes

No. 66
- Position: Guard

Personal information
- Born: February 7, 1933; Steubenville, Ohio, U.S.
- Died: December 9, 1956 (aged 23); Mount Slesse, Hope, British Columbia, Canada
- Listed height: 6 ft 0 in (1.83 m)
- Listed weight: 220 lb (100 kg)

Career information
- High school: Steubenville
- College: Iowa (1953–1955)
- NFL draft: 1956: 9th round, 98th overall pick

Career history
- 1956: Winnipeg Blue Bombers

Awards and highlights
- Outland Trophy (1955); 2× Consensus All-American (1954, 1955); 3× First-team All-Big Ten (1953–1955); Iowa Hawkeyes No. 62 retired

Career CFL statistics
- Games played: 16
- Fumble recoveries: 2
- College Football Hall of Fame (Class of 1980)

Calvin Jack Jones (February 7, 1933 – December 9, 1956) was an American professional football guard. Jones played college football for the Iowa Hawkeyes and he is one of only two players (along with Nile Kinnick) to have his jersey number retired by the school. Jones became the first Hawkeye and the first African-American, to win the Outland Trophy in 1955. He played one year with the Winnipeg Blue Bombers of the Western Interprovincial Football Union (WIFU). He died in a plane crash after playing in the East–West All-Star Game.

Cal Jones is a member of The Pigskin Club Of Washington, D.C. National Intercollegiate All-American Football Players Honor Roll.

== Youth and recruitment ==
Cal Jones was born on the south side of Steubenville, Ohio, the youngest of seven children. His father died when Jones was about one year old. His mother, Talitha Jones, raised Jones and his six older siblings during the Great Depression and World War II.

Jones began playing organized football in the fifth grade. By the time they neared the end of their time at Steubenville High School, Jones and his two friends, Eddie Vincent and Frank Gilliam, were being courted by college football programs. Ohio State and their coach, Woody Hayes, offered a scholarship only to Cal Jones. Jones committed to play at Ohio State, while Vincent and Gilliam accepted scholarships to play for the Iowa Hawkeyes.

Before the fall of 1952, Vincent and Gilliam drove to Jones's house to say goodbye before leaving for Iowa. Jones shocked his friends when he said, "Wait a minute...I'm coming with you." Jones ran upstairs, packed a bag, and rode to Iowa City with Vincent and Gilliam.

Jones' sudden switch from Ohio State to conference rival Iowa caused Big Ten commissioner Tug Wilson to conduct a personal investigation. Iowa was cleared of any wrongdoing. When questioned, Cal Jones reportedly told Wilson, "I'll tell you why I came out here. They treated me like a white man, and I like it here. I'm going to stay."

== College football career ==
The "Steubenville Trio" (as Jones, Vincent, and Gilliam were called) arrived with Iowa football in bad shape. Iowa had had only one winning season in the previous ten years.

Cal Jones was a dominant figure on the field from 1953 to 1955. In 1953, Iowa finished the year ranked 9th in the final AP Poll, Iowa's best finish since the Ironmen in 1939. Jones was named as a first team All-American.

In 1954, Iowa again had a winning season. Jones was named as a consensus first team All-American, despite playing the entire year with a broken wrist. Jones broke it in practice before Iowa's first game but kept the injury concealed from the fans and media all year. That season, Jones also became the first college football player and first African American to be featured on the cover of Sports Illustrated magazine in its September 27, 1954 issue, which shows a tightly cropped slightly blurry image of Jones face wearing a football helmet. This was the 7th issue of Sports Illustrated.

In 1955, Cal Jones was named as Iowa's team captain. Though Iowa struggled to a 3–5–1 record, Jones was named as a consensus first team All-American for the second consecutive year. Cal Jones also won the 1955 Outland Trophy, which goes to the United States' top lineman. He was the first African-American player to win the prestigious award. Jones also finished tenth in the balloting for the Heisman Trophy, an impressive finish for a lineman.

== Professional football career ==
Cal Jones graduated with a 3.0 grade point average at Iowa. He was selected 98th overall in the ninth round of the 1956 NFL draft by the Detroit Lions. He refused to sign with the team as the NFL paid black players less than whites. Instead, he went to Canada and signed with the Winnipeg Blue Bombers of the Western Interprovincial Football Union (WIFU). As a rookie with Winnipeg in 1956, Jones was named to the WIFU All-Star Team. The East–West All-Star Game in Vancouver would be Jones's final football game.

Iowa qualified for the Rose Bowl after the 1956 season. Frank Gilliam had sat out the 1955 season with a broken leg, so Gilliam was playing his final year for the Hawkeyes. Jones was to fly home to Winnipeg, gather a few possessions, and then fly to Pasadena to watch Gilliam in the Rose Bowl after the All-Star game.

== Death ==
On December 9, 1956, Jones overslept his scheduled morning flight from Vancouver, so he scheduled an afternoon flight to stop at Calgary then travel to Winnipeg. Cal Jones' flight on Trans-Canada Air Lines Flight 810, from Vancouver to Calgary crashed at Slesse Mountain (a.k.a. Mount Slesse), killing all 62 people aboard, including one football official and four players from the Saskatchewan Roughriders.

Gilliam and the rest of the Iowa Hawkeye team heard of Jones's death as they prepared for the 1957 Rose Bowl against Oregon State. The team dedicated Iowa's first Rose Bowl appearance to Cal's memory and won the game, 35–19. The team sent the game ball to Talitha Jones, Cal's mother in Steubenville.

== Honors ==
Cal Jones is currently the only three-time first team All-American in Iowa history and was the first college football player on the cover of Sports Illustrated in 1954. He is one of only two Iowa players to be named a consensus first team All-American twice (Larry Station is the other). Jones was inducted into the Iowa Sports Hall of Fame in 1971 and the College Football Hall of Fame in 1980.

In 1989, Iowa fans selected an all-time University of Iowa football team during the 100th anniversary celebration of Iowa football, and Cal Jones was selected to the team as a lineman. And the University of Iowa retired Cal Jones' #62. Jones is one of only two players so honored – Nile Kinnick's #24 is similarly.

The street where Steubenville High School's Harding Stadium is located, is named in Calvin Jones' honor.

== Personal ==
Jones' grandson, Edwin Harrison, was a National Football League guard on the practice squad of the Kansas City Chiefs. He currently plays for the Calgary Stampeders of the Canadian Football League. His search to learn more about the life and death of his grandfather and his family history is at the centre of the 2012 documentary The Crash of Flight 810, part of TSN's Engraved on a Nation series of eight documentaries celebrating the 100th Grey Cup.

== See also ==
- 1954 College Football All-America Team
- List of gridiron football players who died during their careers
