= Trans-Canada Air Lines Flight 810-9 =

1956 aviation accident

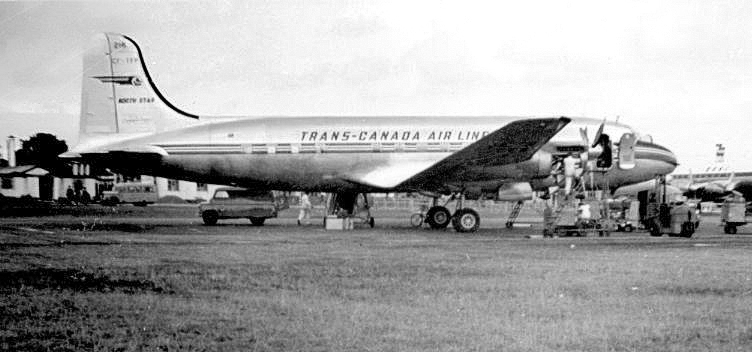
- A TCAL Canadair North-Star

Accident
- Date: 9 December 1956
- Summary: Controlled flight into terrain
- Site: Mount Slesse, near Chilliwack, British Columbia, Canada; 49.0261°N 121.5864°W

Aircraft
- Aircraft type: Canadair North Star
- Operator: Trans-Canada Airlines
- Registration: CF-TFD
- Flight origin: Vancouver International Airport
- Destination: Calgary Municipal Airport
- Passengers: 59
- Crew: 3
- Fatalities: 62
- Survivors: 0

Trans-Canada Air Lines Flight 810-9 was a Canadair North Star on a scheduled flight from Vancouver to Calgary (continuing to Regina, Winnipeg, and Toronto). The plane crashed into Mount Slesse near Chilliwack, British Columbia, Canada, on 9 December 1956 after encountering severe icing and turbulence over the mountains. All 62 people on board died, making it one of the deadliest airline crashes ever as of that date; it still ranks as the sixth deadliest air disaster in Canadian history.

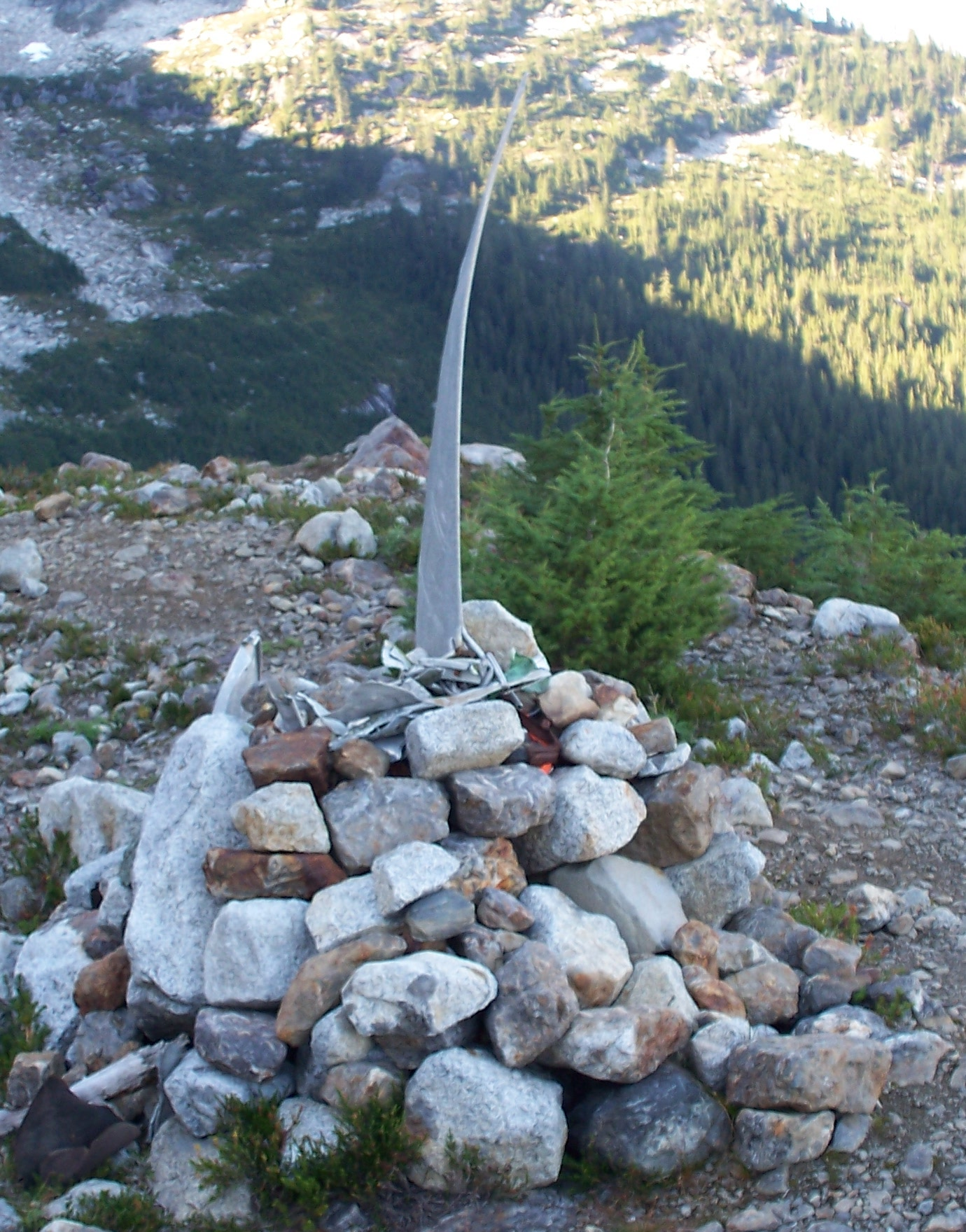
A propeller from Trans-Canada Airlines Flight 810-9

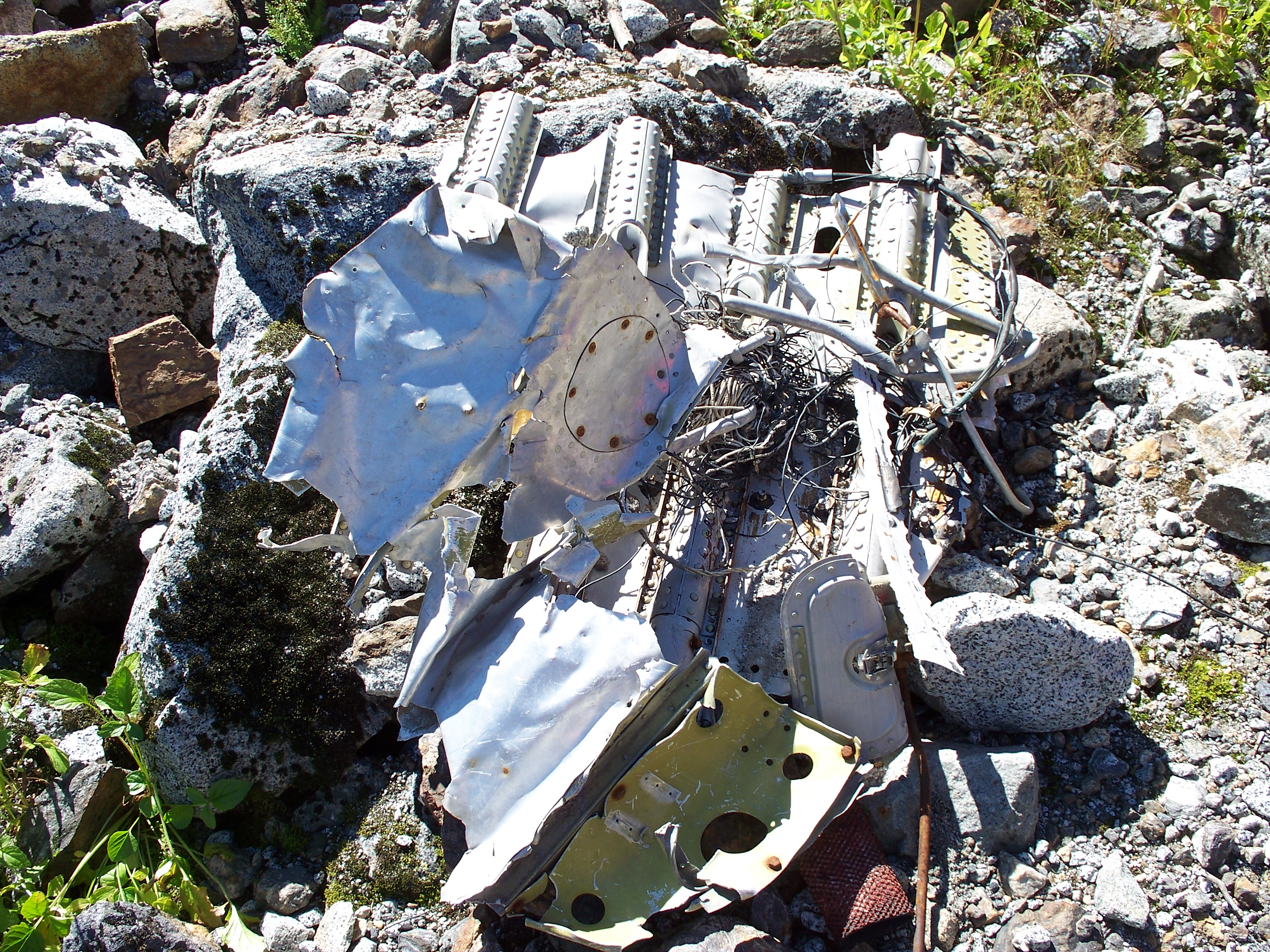
Debris from the crash, found on Slesse Mountain

Due to the remoteness and difficulty of the terrain, the crash site was not located until the following May, when it was discovered by mountaineers Elfrida Pigou, Geoffrey Walker, and David Cathcart. Among the victims were five professional Canadian football players on their way home from the annual Shrine Game between the East and West all-stars in Vancouver.

The remains are in a highly inaccessible area and are protected from disturbance.

== Summary of events ==
Flight 810-9 left Vancouver International Airport at 6:10 pm on 9 December 1956, assigned to fly the Green 1 air lane east to Calgary, Alberta, though the pilots asked for and received clearance for a routing via airways Red 44 and Red 75 instead, which took the aircraft past Cultus Lake and into a weather system called a trowal. The pilots climbed to 19,200 feet (5,900 m) by 6:55, when they experienced a fire warning indication in No. 2 (the inner port engine), which was then shut down as a precaution (false fire warnings in North Star aircraft had been noted on numerous previous occasions.) Pilot Allan Clarke, 35, a former bomber commander, radioed Vancouver Air Traffic Control to notify them of the event ("looks like we had a fire"), requested a return flight path on Airway Green 1 back to Vancouver Airport (the flight path with the most favourable terrain for an aircraft losing altitude), but inexplicably made a right turn instead of a left one and wound up heading west-southwest 12 miles (19 km) south of Green 1 and straight into the border mountains.

At 7:10, the plane radioed that they were passing Hope, and was given clearance to descend to 8,000 feet (2,400 m). This was the last communication received from the plane. The plane was also being tracked by an American radar installation in Birch Bay, Washington, throughout most of its flight after turning around, but at 7:11 pm the station lost track of Flight 810 in the vicinity of 8,530-foot (2,600 m) Mount Silvertip just east-northeast of where the plane went down moments later.

The cause of the crash is given in the official report as being the combination of several factors with the main ones being icing of the wings and fuselage and the loss of No. 2 engine, but many questions remain, including why the aircraft turned away from Green 1 rather than toward it (reporting to ATC that it was on Green 1), and why this was picked up by neither the pilot nor First Officer despite spirit compasses and several radio aids-to-navigation on board which should have made the error rather obvious.

As the aircraft flew straight into the third peak of Mount Slesse well in excess of cruising speed – and crashed in remote and dangerously inhospitable territory – very little information could be gleaned from the wreckage itself as to the cause of what was then the worst aircraft calamity in Canadian history. The wreckage and remains of the passengers and crew were left on the mountain at the crash site (though body parts found during the coroner's inquiry were interred in two common graves on the mountainside), and despite years of erosion and avalanche, remains of the aircraft can be seen to this day.

== Victims ==
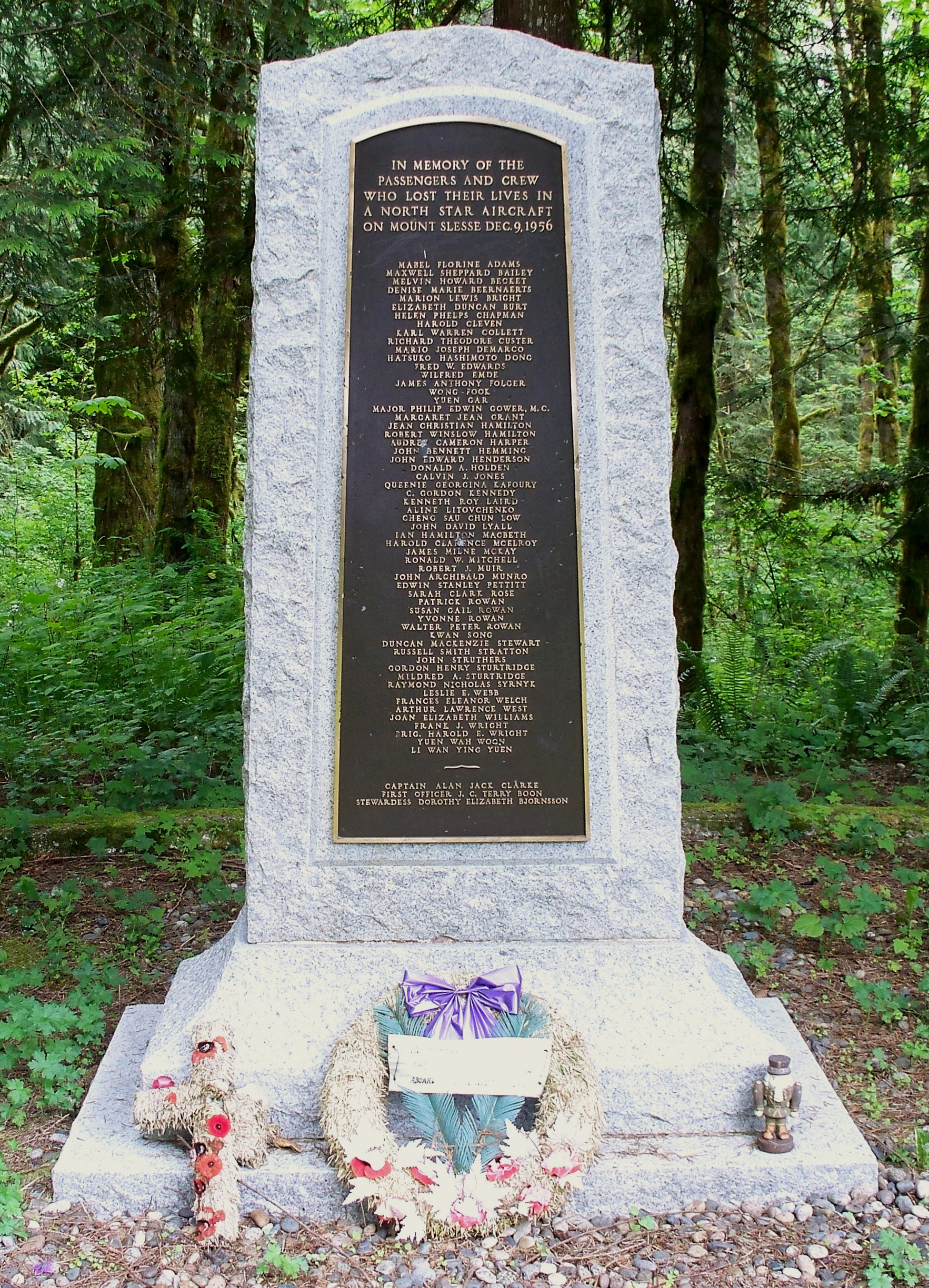
A memorial to the passengers and crew of Flight 810-9 on Slesse Road, Chilliwack, British Columbia

All three crew and 59 passengers were killed; among the victims were five professional Canadian football players on their way home from the annual East–West all-star game in Vancouver.

Notable passengers

- Melvin Becket, a player with the Saskatchewan Roughriders
- Mario DeMarco, former National Football League player, a player with the Saskatchewan Roughriders
- Calvin Jones, a player with Winnipeg Blue Bombers
- Gordon Sturtridge, a player with the Saskatchewan Roughriders
- Ray Syrnyk, a player with the Saskatchewan Roughriders

Nationality	Crew	Passengers	Total
Canada	3	44	47
Hong Kong	–	4	4
Japan	–	2	2
United States	–	9	9
Total	3	59	62

== See also ==
- Aviation safety
- Controlled flight into terrain
- Ground proximity warning system
- List of accidents involving sports teams
