= CFL All-Star Game =

The Canadian Football League (CFL) played an all-star game regularly during the 1950s and 1970s and twice in the 1980s.

== 1950s ==
The first game in 1955 actually precedes the establishment of the Canadian Football Council and the CFL, and was known as the Shrine Game, sponsored by the Shriners to raise funds for Shriners Hospitals for Children. It was held each year from 1955 to 1958 the week after the Grey Cup, as the Interprovincial Rugby Football Union All-Stars took on the Western Interprovincial Football Union.

After the 1956 contest, five players that played in the game (four from the Saskatchewan Roughriders and one from the Winnipeg Blue Bombers) were killed when Trans-Canada Air Lines Flight 810 crashed in what was then the worst air disaster in Canadian history. After poor attendances in the next two Shrine Games (the fact that they were outdoor football games played in Canada in December didn't help), the idea of an All-Star game was dropped.

== 1970s ==
The CFL All-Star Game returned in 1970, now played as a pre-season contest in late June and early July, with the league all-stars taking on the previous season's Grey Cup champion. After no game was held in 1975, the contest returned for three more years (1976–78), with East again meeting West. These games were played before the pre-season (similar to the NFL's Pro Football Hall of Fame Game), in late May and early June; again, poor attendance led to the game's cancellation.

== 1980s ==
Two more CFL All-Star Games were played, in the 1980s: a post-season contest in December 1983 (held indoors in Vancouver), pitting East and West; and a June 1988 game between the CFL All-Stars and the hometown Edmonton Eskimos. Even though the 1988 contest drew a CFL All Star-record 27,573 fans, no game has been held since then.

== List of games ==
There have been 14 CFL All-Star Games. Of the eight games that have featured teams from the East versus West (or IRFU versus WIFU), the West leads the series 5–2–1. The remaining six games featured a CFL All-Star team versus the defending Grey Cup champion. The league team won four of these games, with the Calgary Stampeders and Ottawa Rough Riders each winning once.

Season	Date	Day	Venue	City	Visitor	Score	Home	Attendance	Ref
1955	December 3, 1955	Saturday	Varsity Stadium	Toronto, ON	WIFU All-Stars	6–6 (tie)	IRFU All-Stars	15,088	
1956	December 8, 1956	Saturday	Empire Stadium	Vancouver, BC	IRFU All-Stars	0–35	WIFU All-Stars	13,546	
1957	December 7, 1957	Saturday	Molson Stadium	Montreal, QC	WIFU All-Stars	2–20	IRFU All-Stars	5,000	
1958	December 6, 1958	Saturday	Civic Stadium	Hamilton, ON	WIFU All-Stars	9–3	IRFU All-Stars	7,000	
1970	July 2, 1970	Thursday	Lansdowne Park	Ottawa, ON	CFL All-Stars	35–14	Ottawa Rough Riders	23,094	
1971	June 29, 1971	Tuesday	Autostade	Montreal, QC	CFL All-Stars	30–13	Montreal Alouettes	9,000	
1972	June 28, 1972	Wednesday	McMahon Stadium	Calgary, AB	CFL All-Stars	22–23	Calgary Stampeders	23,616	
1973	June 27, 1973	Wednesday	Ivor Wynne Stadium	Hamilton, ON	CFL All-Stars	22–11	Hamilton Tiger-Cats	24,765	
1974	June 26, 1974	Wednesday	Lansdowne Park	Ottawa, ON	CFL All-Stars	22–25	Ottawa Rough Riders	15,102	
1976	May 29, 1976	Saturday	Clarke Stadium	Edmonton, AB	East All-Stars	16–27	West All-Stars	21,762	
1977	June 4, 1977	Saturday	Exhibition Stadium	Toronto, ON	West All-Stars	19–20	East All-Stars	7,500	
1978	June 3, 1978	Saturday	McMahon Stadium	Calgary, AB	East All-Stars	12–24	West All-Stars	21,000	
1983	December 3, 1983	Saturday	BC Place Stadium	Vancouver, BC	East All-Stars	15–25	West All-Stars	14,000	
1988	June 23, 1988	Thursday	Commonwealth Stadium	Edmonton, AB	CFL All-Stars	15–4	Edmonton Eskimos	27,573	
