= Slesse Mountain =

Mountain in British Columbia, Canada

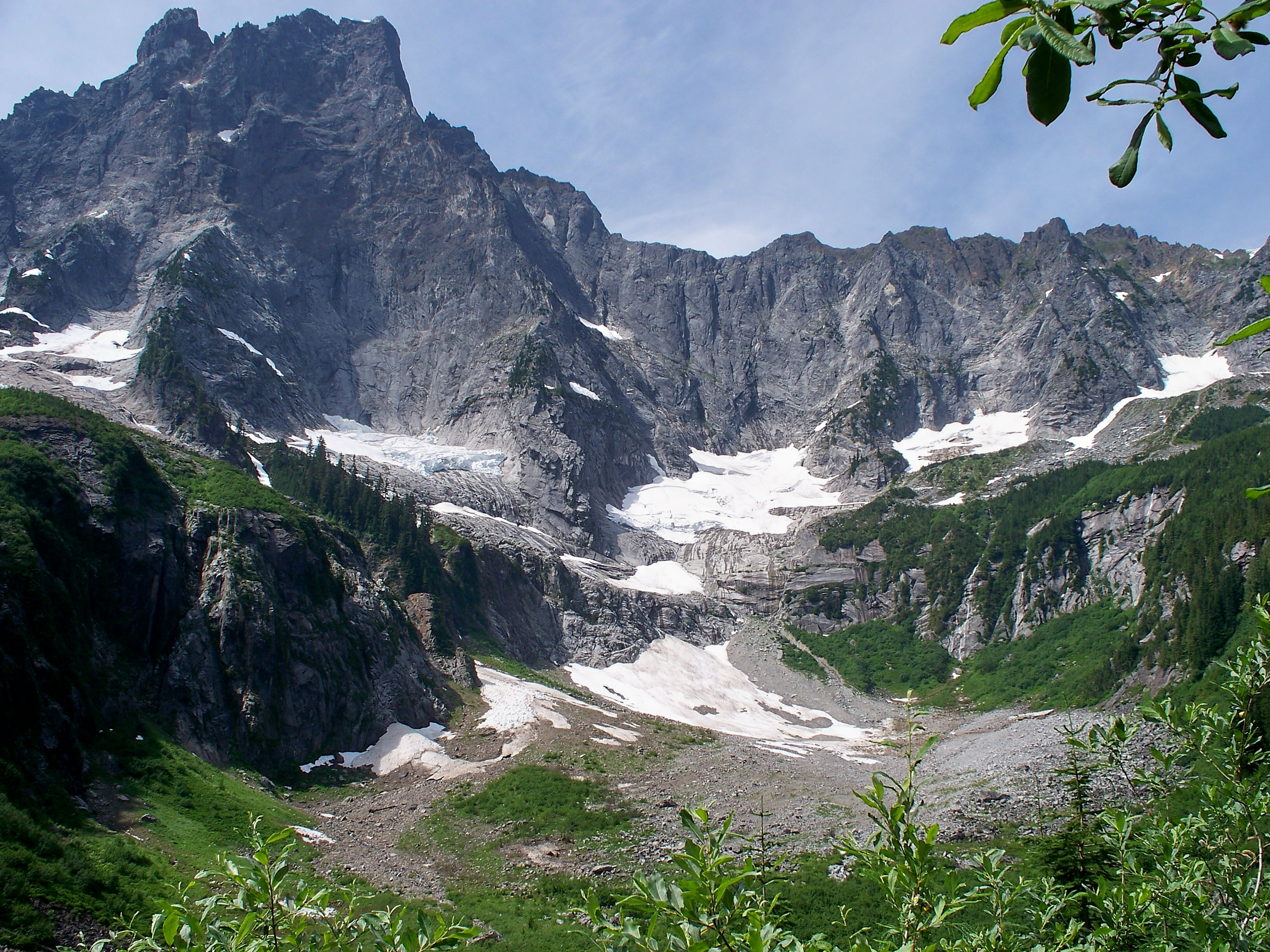
- Slesse Mountain in late July

Highest point
- Elevation: 2,439 m (8,002 ft)
- Prominence: 862 m (2,828 ft)
- Listing: Mountains of British Columbia
- Coordinates: 49°01′32.2″N 121°35′30.9″W

Geography
- Location within British Columbia Location within Canada
- Interactive map of Slesse Mountain
- Location: British Columbia, Canada
- District: Yale Division Yale Land District
- Parent range: Skagit Range, Cascade Mountains
- Topo map: NTS 92H4 Chilliwack

Geology
- Mountain type: Intrusive
- Volcanic belt: Pemberton Volcanic Belt

Climbing
- First ascent: 1927 by Stan Henderson, Mills Winram, Fred Parkes
- Easiest route: Southwest Route (Technical rock climb; Class 5.6)

Slesse Mountain, usually referred to as Mount Slesse, is a mountain just north of the Canada–United States border, in the Cascade Mountains of British Columbia, near the town of Chilliwack. It is notable for its large, steep local relief. For example, its west face drops over 1,950 m (6,398 ft) to Slesse Creek in less than 3 km (2 mi). It is also famous for its huge Northeast Buttress; see the climbing notes below. The name means "fang" in the Halkomelem language. Notable nearby mountains include Mount Rexford and Canadian Border Peak in British Columbia, and American Border Peak, Mount Shuksan, and Mount Baker, all in the US state of Washington.

== Geology ==
Most of Mount Slesse is made up of granitic rocks related to the Chilliwack batholith, which intruded the region 26 to 29 million years ago after the major orogenic episodes in the region. This is part of the Pemberton Volcanic Belt, an eroded volcanic belt that formed as a result of the subduction of the Farallon Plate starting 29 million years ago. The primary rock comprising Slesse is grey diorite from the batholith. However, the summit ridge and the west face are composed of Darrington Phyllite, a metamorphic rock, produced by contact metamorphism with the rock of the batholith and with an intrusion of granodiorite.

== History ==
Mount Slesse was first climbed on August 10, 1927, by Stan Henderson, Mills Winram, and Fred Parkes, via a route starting from Slesse Creek. The standard route today is the Southwest Route, which involves approximately 1,650 m (5,413 ft) of ascent, a good deal of scrambling and some sections of technical rock climbing up to class 5.6. However Slesse is most famous for the Northeast Buttress, first climbed on August 28, 1963 by Fred Beckey, Steve Marts, and Eric Bjornstad. It is a serious multi-day rock climb (Grade V) with technical difficulty of class 5.8 or 5.9. This climb is featured in Roper and Steck's Fifty Classic Climbs of North America. In July 1966 Hans Baer and Jack Bryan did the second ascent of this route, with one bivouac and a straight line exit at the top of the buttress. Climbers come to the Fraser Valley from around the world to climb the aesthetic 24 pitch granite spire, making it one of the most iconic climbs in North America. While the original ascents of Mt. Slesse were multi-day excursions, most modern climbing parties climb the route in a single day.

On December 9, 1956, Trans-Canada Air Lines Flight 810, a North Star airplane crashed on the upper slopes of the mountain, killing all 62 people aboard. This was one of the world's worst air disasters up to that time. Prominent among the dead were team members of the Winnipeg Blue Bombers and Saskatchewan Roughriders, on their way home from the annual East-West All-Star Game in Vancouver. A memorial to the dead can be found on a spur road just above the Chilliwack River Road. The site itself was supposed to have been consecrated by the Cemeteries Act after the discovery of the crash site and associated human remains, some of which were gathered into a common grave. Others found by climbers and hikers have been placed in a "shrine" out of the weather in a discreet location. In the 1990s the provincial government, under pressure from the Families of Slesse organization, finally passed legislation to enshrine protection of the site, which was under threat from clearcut logging at the time, and markers have been placed on trails leading into the site requesting it be respected by hikers and others accessing it.

== Gallery ==
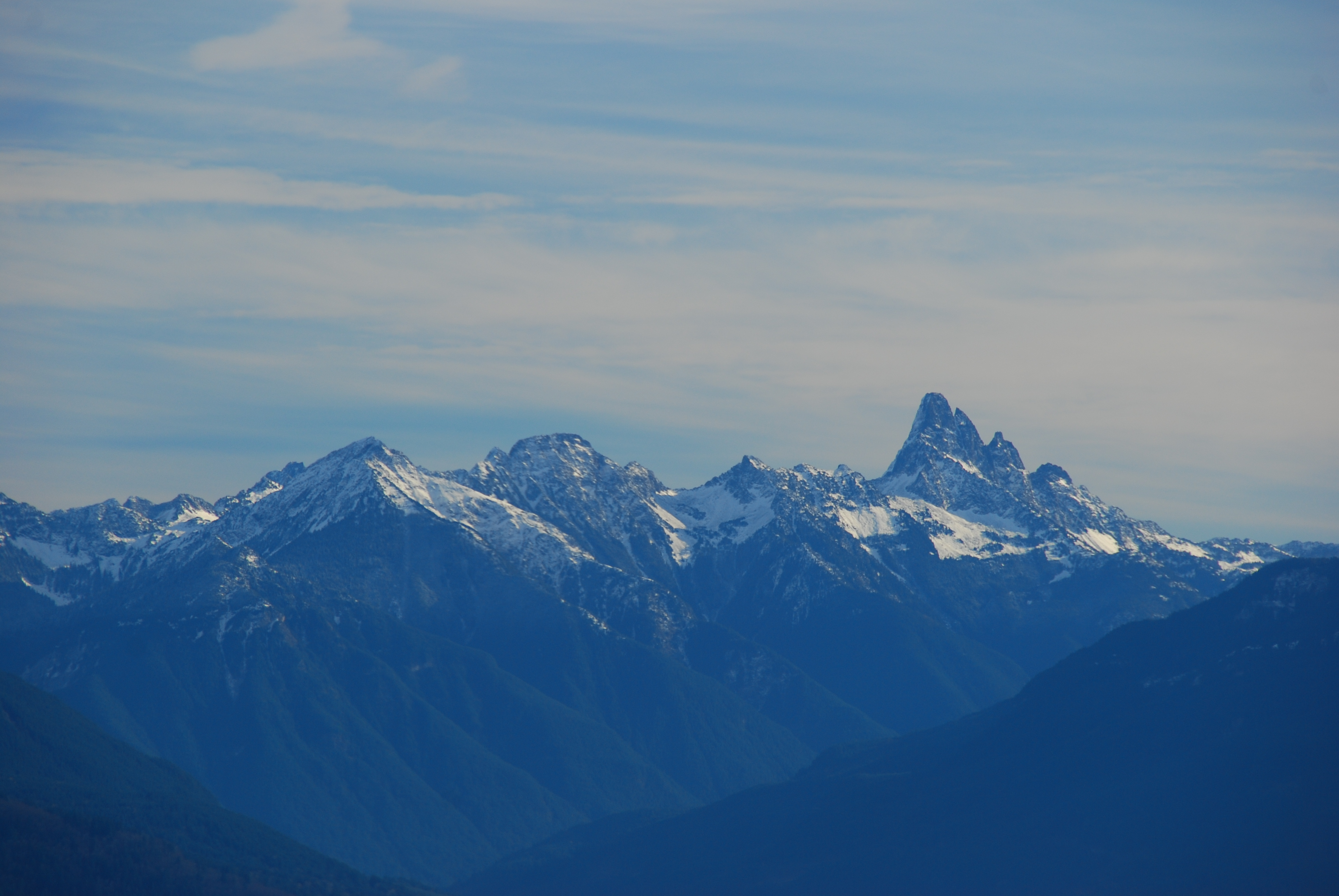
Mount Slesse and its neighbouring range

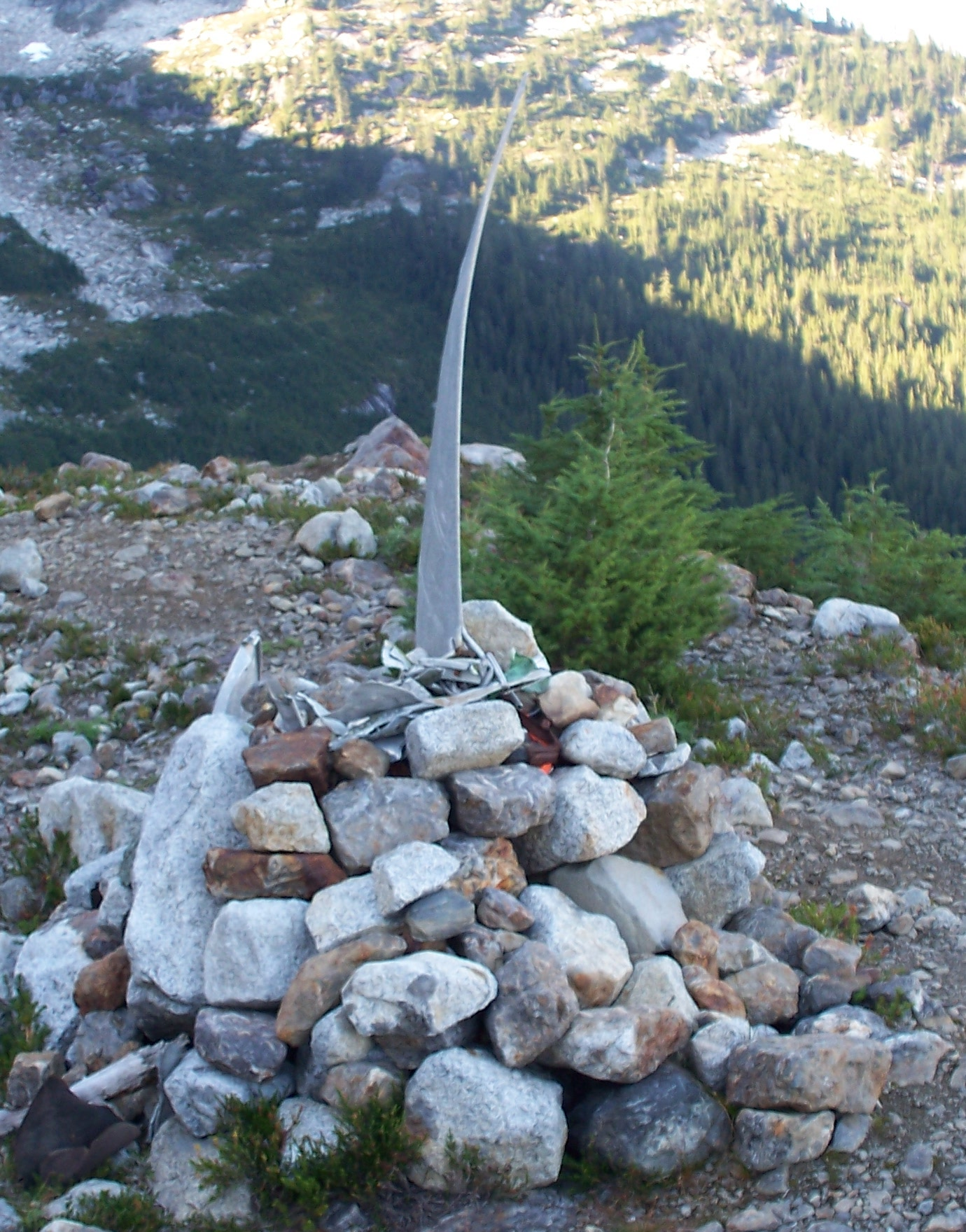
A propeller from Trans-Canada Airlines Flight 810

== See also ==
- Trans-Canada Air Lines Flight 810
