= 1960 Edmonton Eskimos season =

Canadian football team season

- General manager: Joe Ryan
- Head coach: Eagle Keys
- Home stadium: Clarke Stadium

Results
- Record: 10–6
- Division place: 2nd, WIFU
- Playoffs: Lost Grey Cup

The 1960 Edmonton Eskimos finished in second place in the WIFU with a 10–6 record. They defeated the Calgary Stampeders in the Western Semi-Finals and the Winnipeg Blue Bombers in the Western Finals, and were defeated in the Grey Cup by the Ottawa Rough Riders.

== Pre-season ==
=== Schedule ===
Game	Date	Opponent	Results		Venue	Attendance
Game	Date	Opponent	Score	Record	Venue	Attendance
A	Fri, July 15	vs. Montreal Alouettes	W 38–0	1–0		9,000
B	Wed, July 20	at Calgary Stampeders	L 4–17	1–1		
D	Mon, Aug 8	at Montreal Alouettes	L 14–28	1–2		19,570
E	Wed, Aug 10	at Ottawa Rough Riders	L 24–29	1–3		8,350

== Regular season ==
=== Season standings ===
Western Interprovincial Football Union
Team	GP	W	L	T	PF	PA	Pts	
Winnipeg Blue Bombers	16	14	2	0	453	239	28	Details
Edmonton Eskimos	16	10	6	0	318	225	20	Details
Calgary Stampeders	16	6	8	2	374	404	14	Details
BC Lions	16	5	9	2	296	356	12	Details
Saskatchewan Roughriders	16	2	12	2	205	422	6	Details

Week	Game	Date	Opponent	Results		Venue	Attendance
Week	Game	Date	Opponent	Score	Record	Venue	Attendance
1	1	Mon, Aug 15	vs. BC Lions	W 33–14	1–0		17,500
2	2	Mon, Aug 22	vs. Saskatchewan Roughriders	W 19–1	2–0		17,000
3	3	Thurs, Aug 25	at Winnipeg Blue Bombers	L 14–18	2–1		17,287
4	4	Mon, Aug 29	at BC Lions	W 26–0	3–1		28,420
5	5	Sat, Sept 3	vs. Winnipeg Blue Bombers	L 14–15	3–2		19,535
5	6	Mon, Sept 5	at Calgary Stampeders	W 29–28	4–2		
6	7	Sat, Sept 10	vs. Calgary Stampeders	W 41–10	5–2		17,993
7	8	Fri, Sept 16	at Saskatchewan Roughriders	W 29–6	6–2		10,000
7	9	Mon, Sept 19	vs. BC Lions	W 18–10	7–2		
8	10	Mon, Sept 26	at Winnipeg Blue Bombers	W 15–2	8–2		20,932
9	11	Fri, Sept 30	vs. Saskatchewan Roughriders	W 9–2	9–2		14,997
10	12	Thurs, Oct 6	at BC Lions	L 13–21	9–3		21,707
10	13	Sat, Oct 8	vs. Calgary Stampeders	L 11–31	9–4		15,500
11	14	Sat, Oct 15	at Calgary Stampeders	L 17–35	9–5		17,000
11	15	Mon, Oct 17	vs. Winnipeg Blue Bombers	L 17–21	9–6		15,000
12	16	Sat, Oct 22	at Saskatchewan Roughriders	W 13–11	10–6		6,608

=== Roster ===
Edmonton Eskimos roster
Quarterbacks: 12 Jackie Parker; 27 Don Getty; Running backs: 15 Normie Kwong FB; 18 Rollie Miles HB; 20 Cowboy Woodruff HB; 22 Joe-Bob Smith HB; 23 Jim Shipka FB; 24 Johnny Bright FB; 74 Jim Toon FB; Wide receivers: 73 Jim Letcavits; 75 Vic Chapman; 77 Curry Juneau; 78 Tommy Joe Coffey	Offensive linemen: 41 Don Stephenson C; 43 Don Barry C; 51 Ted Tully G; 53 Al Ecuyer G; 55 Gino Fracas G; 56 Michael Kmech G; 62 Roy Stevenson G; 65 Toby Deese T; 66 Roger Nelson T; 67 Jack Lamb T; Defensive linemen: 52 Ed Gray DT; 61 Nat Dye DT; 64 Mike Volcan DT; 70 Bill Smith DE	Defensive backs: 14 Oscar Kruger; 26 Howie Schumm; 72 Steve Bendiak; Others: 22/42 Dick Craddock; 28 Mike Lashuk; 50 Art Walker; 60 Don Duncalfe; 71 P.J. Blake; 81 Thomas Emerson	General Manager: Keith Rolfe (to September 10); Joe Ryan (from September 10); Head coach: Eagle Keys; Assistant coaches: Dan Edwards; Bob Kellogg; Italics indicate Import player

== Playoffs ==
Round	Date	Opponent	Results		Venue	Attendance
Round	Date	Opponent	Score	Record	Venue	Attendance
West Semi-Final #1	Wed, Nov 2	vs. Calgary Stampeders	W 30–7	1–0		16,018
West Semi-Final #2	Sat, Nov 5	at Calgary Stampeders	W 40–21	2–0		20,000
West Final #1	Sat, Nov 12	vs. Winnipeg Blue Bombers	L 16–22	2–1		17,500
West Final #2	Mon, Nov 14	at Winnipeg Blue Bombers	W 10–5	3–1		16,708
West Final #3	Sat, Nov 19	at Winnipeg Blue Bombers	W 4–2	4–1		20,000
Grey Cup	Sat, Nov 26	vs. Ottawa Rough Riders	L 6–16	4–2		36,592

=== Grey Cup ===
Teams	1 Q	2 Q	3 Q	4 Q	Final
Ottawa Rough Riders	3	6	0	7	16
Edmonton Eskimos	0	6	0	0	6

== 1960 CFL Schenley Award Nominees ==
Player	Canadian	Lineman
Jackie Parker	Bill Smith	Roger Nelson

- Jackie Parker was the WIFU nominee for CFL Most Outstanding Player Schenley Award, and won the award over Cookie Gilchrist of the Toronto Argonauts. Parker received 37 votes; Gilchrist received 33.
