= Bob Jeter =

American football player (1937–2008)

No. 11, 21, 29
- Position: Cornerback

Personal information
- Born: May 9, 1937; Union, South Carolina, U.S.
- Died: November 20, 2008 (aged 71); Chicago, Illinois, U.S.
- Listed height: 6 ft 1 in (1.85 m)
- Listed weight: 200 lb (91 kg)

Career information
- High school: Weir (Weirton, West Virginia)
- College: Iowa
- NFL draft: 1960: 2nd round, 17th overall pick
- AFL draft: 1960: 1st round

Career history
- BC Lions (1960–1961); Green Bay Packers (1963–1970); Chicago Bears (1971–1973)

Awards and highlights
- 2× Super Bowl champion (1966, 1967); 3× NFL champion (1965, 1966, 1967); First-team All-Pro (1967); Second-team All-Pro (1968); 2× Pro Bowl (1967, 1969); Green Bay Packers Hall of Fame; National champion (1958); All-American (1959); First-team All-Big Ten (1959)

Career NFL statistics
- Interceptions: 26
- Interception yards: 333
- Touchdowns: 2
- Stats at Pro Football Reference

Robert DeLafayette Jeter Jr. (May 9, 1937 – November 20, 2008) was an American professional football player who was a cornerback in the National Football League (NFL) for the Green Bay Packers and Chicago Bears. He played college football for the Iowa Hawkeyes.

== Early life ==
Jeter was born on May 9, 1937, in Union, South Carolina, the eldest of six children. His father Bob Sr. was a steel worker. At age one, his family moved to the segregated community of Weirton, West Virginia.

Jeter was raised in Weirton and attended the segregated local school, Dunbar High School. After his junior year in 1954, Weirton's schools integrated, and he then attended Weir High School (class of 1956), where Jeter was a football standout his senior year in the fall of 1955. As a senior, he once took a pitch out in the end zone, and ran over 100 yards for a touchdown in his most memorable high school play. He was named All-State and an All American that year. He was also an All-Star basketball player for Weir.

In 1969, Weirton held a "Bob Jeter Day".

== College football ==
Jeter had football scholarship offers from every Big Ten Conference school, as well as the University of Pittsburgh and West Virginia University. He played college football at the University of Iowa (1957–59). As a junior, he rushed for 355 yards, averaging 6.3 yards per carry. In his senior year, Jeter led the Big Ten in rushing with 609 yards (5.6 yards per carry). He was named All-Big Ten.

As a halfback with the Hawkeyes, Jeter rushed for a Rose Bowl record 194 yards on just nine carries against California as a junior in the 1959 Rose Bowl. This total included an 81-yard touchdown run in the third quarter, another record. As a result of this performance, he was the named the game's Most Valuable Player, and Iowa finished as runner-up in the AP poll. He was inducted into the Rose Bowl Hall of Fame in 1994.

In 2010, Jeter was inducted into the University of Iowa Athletics Hall of Fame.

== Professional career ==
Selected 17th overall by the Packers in the second round of the 1960 NFL draft, Jeter began his professional career in the Canadian Football League with the British Columbia Lions. He was used in Canada as a running back in 1960 and 1961, backing up CFL legend and former Iowa teammate Willie Fleming. Still under contract in Canada, Jeter spent the 1962 season on the Packers' taxi squad, saw limited action as a wide receiver in 1963 and 1964, and was moved to defensive back in 1965.

Jeter was part of the Packer teams that won an unprecedented three consecutive NFL championship games and the first two Super Bowls. Herb Adderley and Jeter formed one of the greatest cornerback duos in football history. During this time, Packers defense led the league in fewest points allowed in 1965 and 1966, fewest total yards allowed in 1964 and 1967, and fewest passing yards allowed from 1964 to 1968. Prior to the 1971 training camp under new head coach Dan Devine, Jeter was traded to the Chicago Bears, where he finished his career in 1973.

In eleven NFL seasons, Jeter had 26 interceptions for 333 yards and two touchdowns. He also had two receptions for 25 yards. He was inducted into the Packer Hall of Fame in 1985.

== After football ==
Jeter had worked in Chicago for the Chicago Park District alongside former Big Ten (Illinois) grappler Patrick Heffernan, coordinating citywide sporting events for kids. He also was a warehouse planner for a food company.

His son, Rob Jeter, is the head coach of the men's basketball team at Southern Utah (as of 2025), after 11 seasons as head coach at the University of Wisconsin-Milwaukee (2005–16) and three seasons as head coach at Western Illinois University (2020–23). His brother, Tony Jeter, played at Nebraska and two seasons at tight end with the Pittsburgh Steelers.

== Death ==
Jeter died at age 71 in 2008 in Chicago of a heart attack.
