= 1960 Winnipeg Blue Bombers season =

Canadian football team season

- General manager: Jim Ausley
- President: Gordon Lawson
- Head coach: Bud Grant
- Home stadium: Winnipeg Stadium

Results
- Record: 14–2
- Division place: 1st, West
- Playoffs: Lost West Final

The 1960 Winnipeg Blue Bombers, defending Grey Cup champions, finished in first place in the W.I.F.U. with a league-best record of 14–2. Their 453 points scored were the most in the CFL (although their 28.3 points per game was slightly less than the 28.6 of Ottawa Rough Riders, who scored 400 points but in the East's shorter 14-game schedule). Their 239 points allowed were only 14 more than the Edmonton Eskimos, and their +214 points differential dwarfed Ottawa's +117, which had the second-best total. Their first-place finish earned them the bye into the WIFU Finals. They took the first game of the best two-of-three Finals by defeating Edmonton 22–16 in Edmonton, but lost the next two in Winnipeg by scores of 10–5 and 4–2, bringing an abrupt end to an otherwise dominant season.

== 1960 Preseason ==
On July 29, the Blue Bombers played the BC Lions in Cedar Rapids, Iowa. Part of the local appeal was the presence on three former University of Iowa stars, Kenny Ploen and Ray Jauch of the Blue Bombers, and Willie Fleming of the BC Lions. The Blue Bombers defeated the Lions by a score of 13–7 in front of 12,583 fans.

== 1960 regular season ==
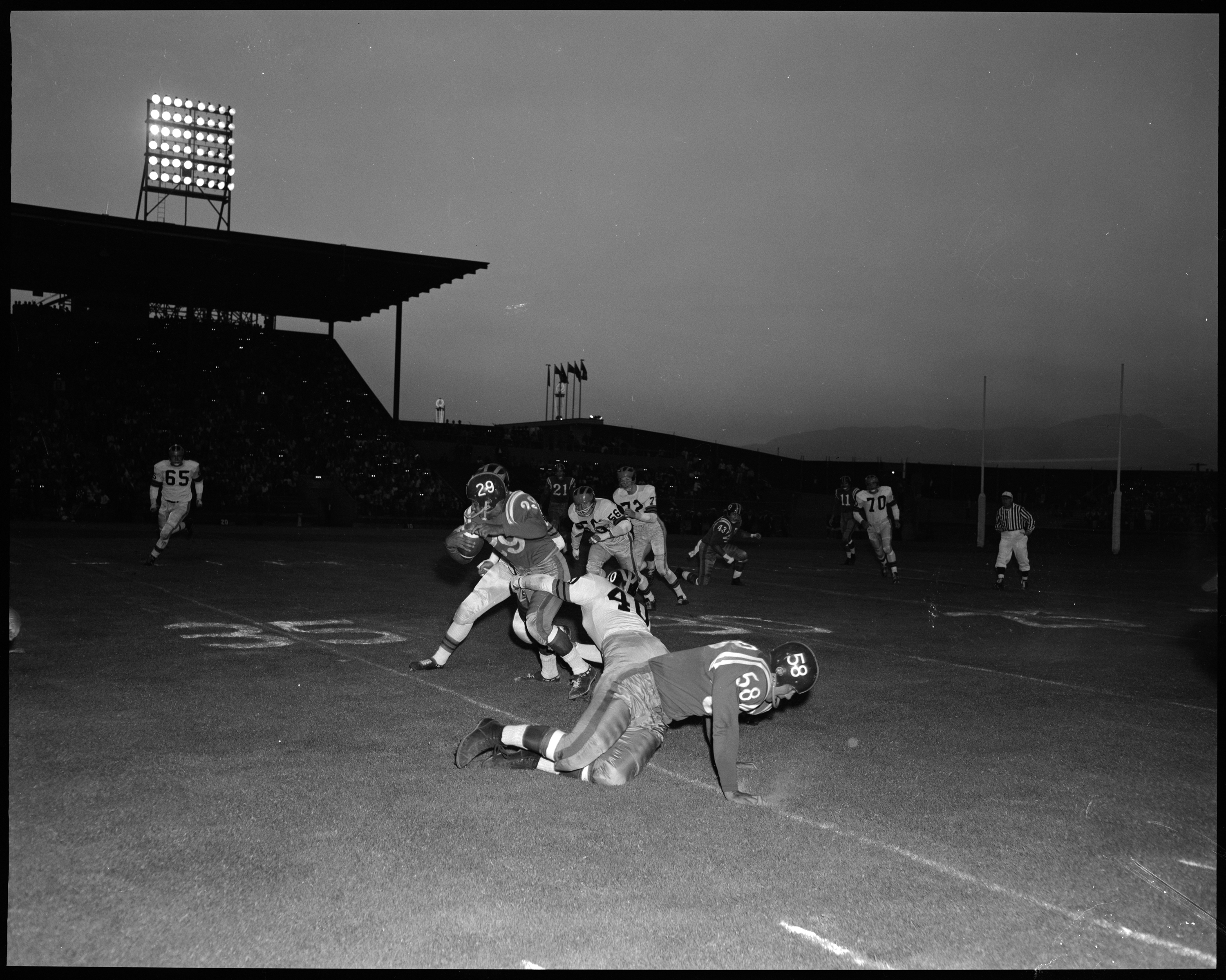
Winnipeg Blue Bombers at BC Lions, August 11

Fullback and punter Charlie Shepard set a record with a 95-yard punt for a single in the victory over the Saskatchewan Roughriders on September 12.

=== Injuries ===
The Blue Bombers lost tackle Buddy Tinsley for two games with a facial injury and fullback Tony Kehrer for the season with a leg fracture, from injuries sustained in the victory over the BC Lions on September 17. End Farrell Funston was lost for the season after suffering a separated shoulder in the victory over the BC Lions on October 13.

Quarterback Kenny Ploen broke a bone in his throwing hand in the third quarter of the first game of the WIFU Final in Edmonton. At that point, Vernon Cole took over at quarterback while Ploen shifted to safety, for the balance of game one and all of game two.

=== Buddy Tinsley Night ===
The Blue Bombers honored their 11-year veteran tackle with "Buddy Tinsley Night" at half-time during their Thursday, October 13, 1960, game versus the BC Lions. Tinsley, a Baylor grad, had been an all-star in seven of the previous ten seasons. Coach Bud Grant said the team requested a special players' meeting, without Tinsley, to prepare. The Winnipeg crowd of 16,773 was delighted when Tinsley lined up at fullback and took a hand-off from quarterback Kenny Ploen over from the BC one-yard line for a touchdown late in the fourth quarter.

Coincidentally, three other Blue Bomber linemen also scored touchdowns, although all three—by center Garland Warren, guard Cornell Piper and linebacker Jack Delveaux—came on BC fumbles.

CFL commissioner Syd Halter took a dim view of the length of the ceremony for Tinsley. He slapped the Bombers with a $100 fine for the delay caused to the start of the second half.

=== Season standings ===
Western Interprovincial Football Union
Team	GP	W	L	T	PF	PA	Pts
Winnipeg Blue Bombers	16	14	2	0	453	239	28
Edmonton Eskimos	16	10	6	0	318	225	20
Calgary Stampeders	16	6	8	2	374	404	14
BC Lions	16	5	9	2	296	356	12
Saskatchewan Roughriders	16	2	12	2	205	422	6

== 1960 Season schedule ==
=== Preseason ===
Game	Date	Opponent	Results		Venue	Attendance
Game	Date	Opponent	Score	Record	Venue	Attendance
Pre	Thu July 21	Blue-Gold Intra-Squad Game	Gold 27 – Blue 19	0–0	Winnipeg Stadium	17,000
A	Fri, July 29	vs. BC Lions	W 13–7	1–0	Kingston Stadium	12,583
B	Mon, Aug 1	at Montreal Alouettes	L 16–26	1–1	McGill Stadium	19,395
C	Thu, Aug 4	vs. Ottawa Rough Riders	W 18–14	2–1	Winnipeg Stadium	15,147

=== 1960 regular season ===
Day	Date	Opponent	Score	Attendance
Thursday	August 11, 1960	at BC Lions	W 35–21	31,837
Monday	August 15, 1960	at Calgary Stampeders	W 38–23	20,450
Thursday	August 18, 1960	Calgary Stampeders	W 50–7	18,389
Thursday	August 25, 1960	Edmonton Eskimos	W 18–14	17,287
Saturday	August 27, 1960	at Saskatchewan Roughriders	W 27–0	12,000
Thursday	September 1, 1960	BC Lions	W 19–14	18,297
Saturday	September 3, 1960	at Edmonton Eskimos	W 15–14	19,535
Monday	September 12, 1960	Saskatchewan Roughriders	W 38–11	16,367
Saturday	September 17, 1960	at BC Lions	W 26–14	30,292
Monday	September 19, 1960	at Calgary Stampeders	W 19–17	14,000
Monday	September 26, 1960	Edmonton Eskimos	L 15–2	20,932
Saturday	October 1, 1960	Calgary Stampeders	W 31–21	15,968
Monday	October 10, 1960	at Saskatchewan Roughriders	W 48–7	10,300
Thursday	October 13, 1960	BC Lions	W 49–21	16,773
Monday	October 17, 1960	at Edmonton Eskimos	W 21–17	15,000
Monday	October 24, 1960	Saskatchewan Roughriders	L 23–17	13,900

=== 1960 Playoffs ===
==== Western Conference Finals ====
(best two-out-of-three series)

Day	Date	Opponent	Score	Attendance
Saturday	November 12, 1960	at Edmonton Eskimos	W 22–16	17,500
Monday	November 14, 1960	Edmonton Eskimos	L 10–5	16,708
Saturday	November 19, 1960	Edmonton Eskimos	L 4–2	18,600

- Edmonton won the series two games to one. Edmonton advanced to play the Ottawa Rough Riders in the Grey Cup.

== 1960 CFL Schenley Award Nominees ==
Player	Canadian	Lineman
Leo Lewis	Gerry James	Herb Gray

- Herb Gray was the WIFU nominee for CFL Most Outstanding Lineman Schenley Award, and won the award over Kaye Vaughan of the Ottawa Rough Riders.
