= Exelby (surname) =

Exelby is a surname. Notable people with the surname include:

- Clare Exelby (born 1938), Canadian football player
- Garnet Exelby (born 1981), Canadian ice hockey player
- John Exelby (1940/1941–2019), British journalist
- Leon Exelby (1888–1962), American football player
- Marion Exelby (born 1951), Australian fencer
- Murray Exelby (1912–1987), Australian rules footballer
- Natasha Exelby, Australian journalist
- Phil Exelby (1905–1981), New Zealand lawn bowls player
- Randy Exelby (born 1965), Canadian ice hockey player
