= Keith Webster =

Keith Webster may refer to:

- Keith Webster (Canadian football) (born 1937), retired Canadian football player
- Keith Webster (English footballer) (born 1945), English former footballer
