= Ross Buckle =

Canadian football player

Profile
- Positions: defensive end, wide receiver

Personal information
- Born: February 26, 1936 (age 90); London, Ontario
- Listed height: 6 ft 0 in (1.83 m)
- Listed weight: 195 lb (88 kg)

Career information
- College: none

Career history
- 1959–1964: Montreal Alouettes

Ross Buckle (born February 26, 1936) was a wide receiver in the Canadian Football League from 1959 to 1964, all for the same team, the Montreal Alouettes.

After playing three years with the hometown London Lords of the Ontario Rugby Football Union from 1956 to 1958, Ross Buckle joined the Montreal Alouettes in 1959 and played until 1964. Buckle played mainly defensive end, along with action as a wide receiver. His best year on offense was 1961 when he caught 5 passes, 2 for touchdowns, including one for 94 yards. He played over 10 games every year from 1959 to 1963 but in only one in 1964 when he was released by the Als and never played another down.
