= 1960 Saskatchewan Roughriders season =

CFL team season

- General manager: Ken Preston
- Head coach: Ken Carpenter
- Home stadium: Taylor Field

Results
- Record: 2–12–2
- Division place: 5th, West
- Playoffs: did not qualify

Uniform

The 1960 Saskatchewan Roughriders finished in fifth place (last) in the W.I.F.U. with a 2–12–2 record. Their six points were six behind the fourth-place BC Lions, and eight points behind the third-place Calgary Stampeders who claimed the third and final playoff spot.

== 1960 Preseason ==
On July 28, the Roughriders played the London Lords of the Senior Ontario Rugby Football Union in London, Ontario, and beat their hosts 38–0.

== 1960 regular season ==
=== Season standings ===
Western Interprovincial Football Union
Team	GP	W	L	T	PF	PA	Pts
Winnipeg Blue Bombers	16	14	2	0	453	239	28
Edmonton Eskimos	16	10	6	0	318	225	20
Calgary Stampeders	16	6	8	2	374	404	14
BC Lions	16	5	9	2	296	356	12
Saskatchewan Roughriders	16	2	12	2	205	422	6

== 1960 Season schedule ==
=== 1960 Preseason ===
Game	Date	Opponent	Results		Venue	Attendance
Game	Date	Opponent	Score	Record	Venue	Attendance
A	Tue, July 26	at Ottawa Rough Riders	L 0–26	0–1	Lansdowne Park	6,858
B	Thur, July 28	at London Lords (ORFU)	W 38–0	1–1–0		3,000
C	Tue, August 2	at Hamilton Tiger-Cats	L 14–17	1–2–0	Civic Stadium	7,000

=== 1960 regular season ===
Week	Game	Date	Opponent	Results		Venue	Attendance
Week	Game	Date	Opponent	Score	Record	Venue	Attendance
1	1	Fri, Aug 12	Calgary Stampeders	T 15–15	0–0–1	Taylor Field	13,192
2	2	Sat, Aug 20	at BC Lions	L 12–27	0–1–1	Empire Stadium	29,532
2	3	Mon, Aug 22	at Edmonton Eskimos	L 1–19	0–2–1	Clarke Stadium	17,000
3	4	Sat, Aug 27	Winnipeg Blue Bombers	L 0–27	0–3–1	Taylor Stadium	12,000
3	5	Mon, Aug 29	at Calgary Stampeders	L 15–23	0–4–1	McMahon Stadium	13,500
4	6	Mon, Sept 5	BC Lions	L 21–31	0–5–1	Taylor Stadium	14,105
5	7	Mon, Sept 12	at Winnipeg Blue Bombers	L 11–38	0–6–1	Winnipeg Stadium	16,367
6	8	Fri, Sept 16	Edmonton Eskimos	L 6–29	0–7–1	Taylor Field	10,000
7	9	Mon, Sept 26	Calgary Stampeders	W 45–35	1–7–1	Taylor Field	n/a
8	10	Fri, Sept 30	at Edmonton Eskimos	L 2–9	1–8–1	Clarke Stadium	14,997
9	11	Wed, Oct 5	at Calgary Stampeders	L 22–39	1–9–1	McMahon Stadium	11,000
9	12	Mon, Oct 10	Winnipeg Blue Bombers	L 7–48	1–10–1	Taylor Field	10,300
10	13	Sat, Oct 15	BC Lions	T 14–14	1–10–2	Taylor Field	7,255
11	14	Sat, Oct 22	Edmonton Eskimos	L 11–13	1–11–2	Taylor Field	6,608
11	15	Mon, Oct 24	at Winnipeg Blue Bombers	W 23–17	2–11–2	Winnipeg Stadium	n/a
13	16	Sat, Oct 29	at BC Lions	L 0–38	2–12–2	Empire Stadium	21,114

- The Saskatchewan Roughriders failed to make the playoffs.

== 1960 CFL Schenley Award Nominees ==
Player	Canadian	Lineman
Phil Branch	Ron Atcheson	Bill Burrell
