= 1960 CFL season =

Canadian Football League season

- Duration: June – October, 1960
- East champions: Ottawa Rough Riders
- West champions: Edmonton Eskimos

48th Grey Cup
- Date: November 26, 1960
- Venue: Empire Stadium, Vancouver
- Champions: Ottawa Rough Riders

CFL seasons
- 1959 1961

Canadian Football League team locations: WIFU, East

The 1960 CFL season is considered to be the seventh season in modern-day Canadian football, although it is officially the third Canadian Football League season.

== CFL news in 1960 ==
The IRFU changed its name to become the Eastern Football Conference.

The CFL allowed unlimited blocking on interception returns.

The Calgary Stampeders moved into McMahon Stadium on Monday, August 15, after it took only 103 days to be built.

On September 14, four of the six directors of the Montreal Alouettes abruptly resigned their positions. The resignations of Lucien Beauregard, Morgan N. Johnston, David C. McConnell and W. Heard Wert left only owner-president Ted Workman and general manager-coach Perry Moss on the board.

Rosters were reduced from 40 players to 34 on September 15.

Ottawa's Ron Stewart rushed for 287 yards on 16 carries in a game in Montreal against the Alouettes on Monday, October 10. He rushed for four touchdowns, one in each quarter, on runs of 39, 51, 51 and 37 yards. He broke the single-game record of 217 yards held previously by Hamilton's Gerry McDougall.

The Winnipeg Blue Bombers honoured their 11-year veteran guard with "Buddy Tinsley Night" at half-time during their Thursday, October 13, 1960, game versus the BC Lions. The Winnipeg crowd of 16,773 was delighted when Tinsley lined up at fullback and took a hand-off from quarterback Kenny Ploen over from the BC one-yard line for a touchdown late in the fourth quarter.

At league meetings during Grey Cup week, Western teams dropped their insistence on sharing in the lucrative television rights payments received by the Big Four (Eastern) teams as a condition of accepting an interlocking schedule. It was agreed to begin a partially interlocking schedule in 1961, with travel costs to be offset by an across-the-board surcharge of 25 cents on the price of every ticket sold (each team, every seat, every game).

=== 1960 Preseason ===
The CFL played an unbalanced schedule of Exhibition games.

Four teams (Ottawa, Toronto, Winnipeg and Hamilton) played their annual split-squad scrimmages at the conclusion of their preliminary training camps.

25 players received skin burns during an Edmonton–Calgary game played at Mewata Stadium in Calgary on July 20. Two Eskimos, Roger Nelson and Jim Shipka, were treated in a Calgary hospital. Two Stampeders, Doug Brown and Ernest Warlick, filed damage claims with the City of Calgary. The lime used for field markings initially was suspected as being the cause, although laboratory tests later determined it was fully hydrated and should not have been the culprit. Fertilizer also was suggested as a possible cause of the skin burns.

On July 28, the Saskatchewan Roughriders played the London Lords of the Senior Ontario Rugby Football Union in London, Ontario, and beat their hosts 38–0.

On July 29, the BC Lions played the Winnipeg Blue Bombers in Cedar Rapids, Iowa. Part of the local appeal was the presence on three former University of Iowa stars, Kenny Ploen and Ray Jauch of the Blue Bombers, and Willie Fleming of the BC Lions.

After playing (and losing to) the NFL Chicago Cardinals in 1959, the Toronto Argonauts hosted the NFL Pittsburgh Steelers at CNE Stadium on August 3 and lost 43–16. Both teams used 12 players, with a handful of NFL rules (blocking, punt returns) blended into the Canadian game.

Toronto also played host to an NFL exhibition game between the Chicago Bears and the New York Giants, at Varsity Stadium on Monday, August 15. Top ticket price was $10, which was the most ever charged for a non-Grey Cup game in Toronto. George Halas of the Bears, who also served as chairman of the NFL's expansion committee, admitted that in 1961 the NFL would have 14 teams, an awkward number, and that 16 teams would be more convenient for scheduling. It was suggested that this game was a trial balloon for a possible expansion team in Toronto. Chicago defeated the Giants by a 16–7 score, but the paid attendance was only 5,401, handing the promoters a $30,000 loss and effectively ending any chance of an NFL team north of the border.

Day	Date	Visitor		Home		Location	Attendance
Fri	15 July	Montreal	0	Edmonton	38	Edmonton	9,000
Tue	19 July	Ottawa Red	14	Ottawa White	7	Ottawa	–
Wed	20 July	Montreal	29	BC	29	Vancouver	24,392
Wed	20 July	Edmonton	4	Calgary	17	Calgary	–
Thu	21 July	Toronto Blue	14	Toronto White	27	Aurora, Ontario	–
Thu	21 July	Winnipeg Blue	19	Winnipeg Gold	27	Winnipeg	17,000
Tue	26 July	BC	49	Montreal	7	Montreal	19,999
Tue	26 July	Saskatchewan	6	Ottawa	20	Ottawa	–
Wed	27 July	Calgary	30	Toronto	51	Toronto	12,692
Wed	27 July	Hamilton Black	20	Hamilton Gold	20	Hamilton	–
Thu	28 July	Saskatchewan	38	London Lords (ORFU)	0	London, Ontario	–
Fri	29 July	BC	7	Winnipeg	13	Cedar Rapids, Iowa	12,583
Mon	1 August	Winnipeg	16	Montreal	26	Montreal	19,395
Tue	2 August	Saskatchewan	14	Hamilton	17	Hamilton	7,000
Tue	2 August	Ottawa	26	BC	27	Vancouver	18,156
Wed	3 August	Pittsburgh Steelers (NFL)	43	Toronto	16	Toronto	23,570
Thu	4 August	Ottawa	14	Winnipeg	18	Winnipeg	–
Mon	8 August	Edmonton	14	Montreal	28	Montreal	19,570
Wed	10 August	Edmonton	29	Ottawa	24	Ottawa	8,350
Wed	10 August	Hamilton	7	Toronto	14	Toronto	10,282

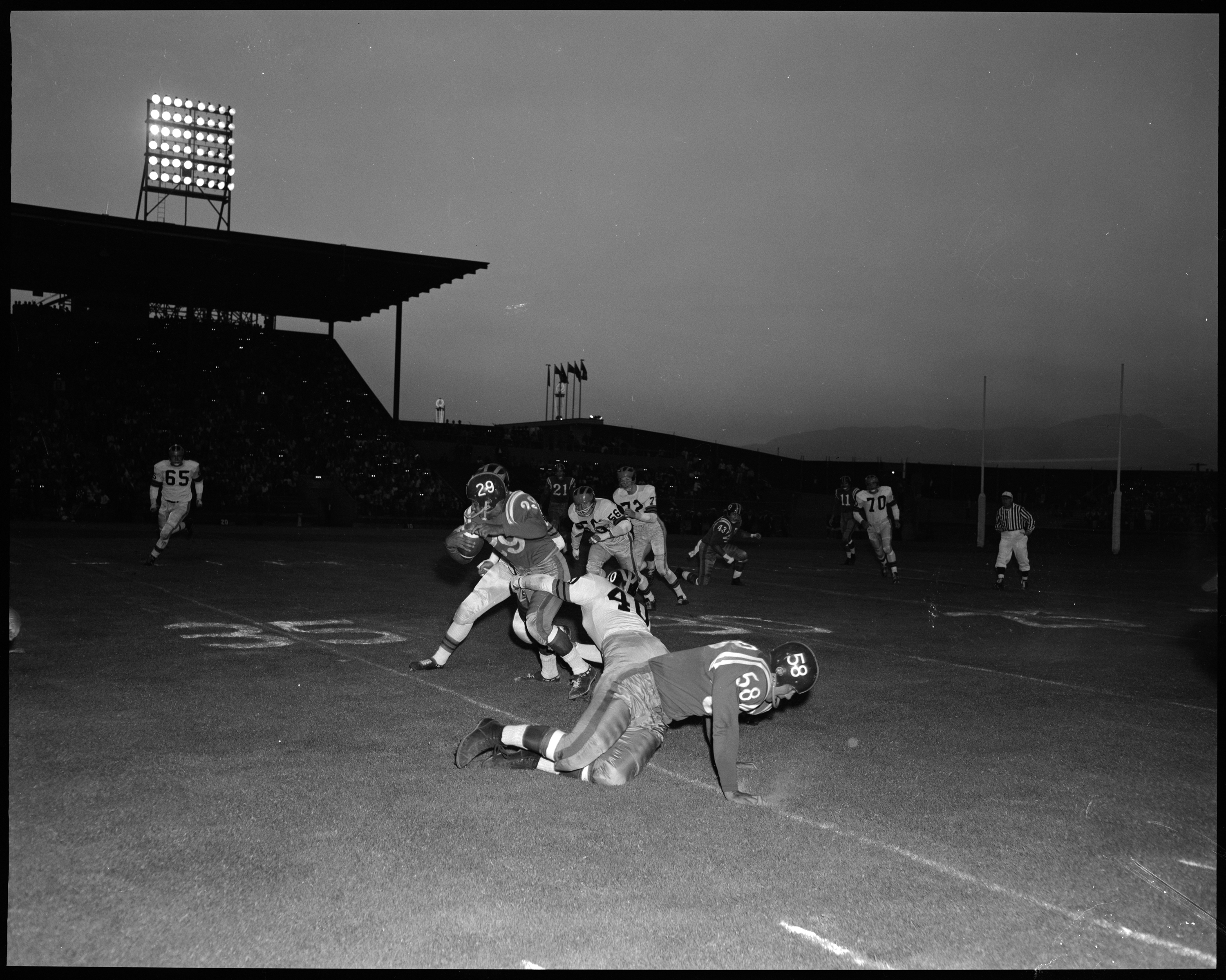
BC Lions vs. Winnipeg Blue Bombers, August 11

=== 1960 regular season ===
Coaching Changes

Calgary

- Fri 19 August – Otis Douglas resigns as head coach of the Calgary Stampeders, after the club started the season with a tie and two losses. General Manager Jim Finks acts as co-ordinator of coaches for Calgary's August 22 game versus the BC Lions (a loss).
- Tue 23 August – Steve Owen is appointed head coach for the remainder of the 1960 season.

General Manager Changes

Edmonton

- Sat 10 September – Keith Rolfe resigns as General Manager of the Edmonton Eskimos, to take a position with an oil company in Calgary. Joe Ryan, formerly with the Toronto Argonauts, is named as his successor.

== Regular-season standings ==
West Division
Pos	Team	Pld	W	L	T	PF	PA	PD	Pts
1	Winnipeg Blue Bombers (C, Q)	16	14	2	0	453	239	+214	28
2	Edmonton Eskimos (Q)	16	10	6	0	318	225	+93	20
3	Calgary Stampeders (Q)	16	6	8	2	374	404	−30	14
4	BC Lions	16	5	9	2	296	356	−60	12
5	Saskatchewan Roughriders	16	2	12	2	205	422	−217	6

(C) First round bye; (Q) Qualified for playoffs

East Division
Pos	Team	Pld	W	L	T	PF	PA	PD	Pts
1	Toronto Argonauts (C, Q)	14	10	4	0	370	265	+105	20
2	Ottawa Rough Riders (Q)	14	9	5	0	400	283	+117	18
3	Montreal Alouettes (Q)	14	5	9	0	340	458	−118	10
4	Hamilton Tiger-Cats	14	4	10	0	273	377	−104	8

(C) First round bye; (Q) Qualified for playoffs

Winnipeg and Toronto have first round byes.

== Grey Cup playoffs ==
Note: All dates in 1960

=== Conference Semi-Finals ===
Western Semi-Finals
Calgary Stampeders vs Edmonton Eskimos
Game	Date	Away	Home
1	November 2	Calgary Stampeders 7	Edmonton Eskimos 30
2	November 5	Edmonton Eskimos 40	Calgary Stampeders 21
Edmonton won the total-point series by 70–28

Eastern Semi-Finals
Montreal Alouettes @ Ottawa Rough Riders
Date	Away	Home
November 5	Montreal Alouettes 14	Ottawa Rough Riders 30

=== Conference finals ===
Western Finals
Winnipeg Blue Bombers vs Edmonton Eskimos
Game	Date	Away	Home
1	November 12	Winnipeg Blue Bombers 22	Edmonton Eskimos 16
2	November 14	Edmonton Eskimos 10	Winnipeg Blue Bombers 5
3	November 19	Edmonton Eskimos 4	Winnipeg Blue Bombers 2
Edmonton wins the best of three series 2–1

Eastern Finals
Toronto Argonauts vs Ottawa Rough Riders
Game	Date	Away	Home
1	November 12	Toronto Argonauts 21	Ottawa Rough Riders 33
2	November 20	Ottawa Rough Riders 21	Toronto Argonauts 20
Ottawa won total-point series 54–41

== Playoff bracket ==
Semifinals
East
E2	Ottawa Rough Riders	30
E3	Montreal Alouettes	14
West
W2	Edmonton Eskimos	70 (30+40)
W3	Calgary Stampeders	28 (7+21)

Finals
E1	Toronto Argonauts	41 (21+20)
E2	Ottawa Rough Riders	54 (33+21)
W1	Winnipeg Blue Bombers	1 (22,5,2)
W2	Edmonton Eskimos	2 (16,10,4)

48th Grey Cup
E2	Ottawa Rough Riders	16
W2	Edmonton Eskimos	6

=== Grey Cup Championship ===
November 26 48th Annual Grey Cup Game: Empire Stadium – Vancouver, British Columbia
Western Champion	Eastern Champion
Edmonton Eskimos 6	Ottawa Rough Riders 16
The Ottawa Rough Riders are the 1960 Grey Cup Champions
Ron Stewart (RB), Ottawa Rough Riders – Grey Cup's Most Valuable Player.

== CFL leaders ==
- CFL passing leaders
- CFL rushing leaders
- CFL receiving leaders

== 1960 Eastern All-Stars ==
=== Offence ===
- QB – Sam Etcheverry, Montreal Alouettes
- RB – Cookie Gilchrist, Toronto Argonauts
- RB – Dave Thelen, Ottawa Rough Riders
- RB – Ron Stewart, Ottawa Rough Riders
- E – Hal Patterson, Montreal Alouettes
- E – Paul Dekker, Hamilton Tiger-Cats
- F – Dave Mann, Toronto Argonauts
- C – Norm Stoneburgh, Toronto Argonauts
- OG – Jackie Simpson, Montreal Alouettes
- OG – Kaye Vaughan, Ottawa Rough Riders
- OT – Bill Hudson, Montreal Alouettes
- OT – John Barrow, Hamilton Tiger-Cats

=== Defence ===
- DT – Angelo Mosca, Ottawa Rough Riders
- DT – John Barrow, Hamilton Tiger-Cats
- DE – Lou Bruce, Ottawa Rough Riders
- DE – Dick Fouts, Toronto Argonauts
- DG – Marty Martinello, Toronto Argonauts
- LB – Gary Schreider, Ottawa Rough Riders
- LB – Cookie Gilchrist, Toronto Argonauts
- LB – Jim Andreotti, Toronto Argonauts
- LB – Gerald Nesbitt, Ottawa Rough Riders
- DB – Jim Rountree, Toronto Argonauts
- DB – Joe Poirier, Ottawa Rough Riders
- S – Stan Wallace, Toronto Argonauts

== 1960 Western All-Stars ==
=== Offence ===
- QB – Jackie Parker, Edmonton Eskimos
- RB – Willie Fleming, British Columbia Lions
- RB – Earl Lunsford, Calgary Stampeders
- RB – Leo Lewis, Winnipeg Blue Bombers
- RB – Johnny Bright, Edmonton Eskimos
- E – Ernie Pitts, Winnipeg Blue Bombers
- E – Ernie Warlick, Calgary Stampeders
- C – Neil Habig, Saskatchewan Roughriders
- OG – Cornel Piper, Winnipeg Blue Bombers
- OG – Tony Pajaczkowski, Calgary Stampeders
- OT – Frank Rigney, Winnipeg Blue Bombers
- OT – Roger Nelson, Edmonton Eskimos

=== Defence ===
- DT – Don Luzzi, Calgary Stampeders
- DT – Urban Henry, British Columbia Lions
- DE – Ed Gray, Edmonton Eskimos
- DE – Herb Gray, Winnipeg Blue Bombers
- MG – Ron Atchison, Saskatchewan Roughriders
- LB – Gord Rowland, Winnipeg Blue Bombers
- LB – Norm Fieldgate, British Columbia Lions
- LB – Bill Burrell, Saskatchewan Roughriders
- LB – David Burkholder, Winnipeg Blue Bombers
- DB – Bill Smith, Edmonton Eskimos
- DB – Clare Exelby, Calgary Stampeders
- S – Harvey Wylie, Calgary Stampeders

== 1960 CFL awards ==
- CFL's Most Outstanding Player Award – Jackie Parker (QB), Edmonton Eskimos
- CFL's Most Outstanding Canadian Award – Ron Stewart (RB), Ottawa Rough Riders
- CFL's Most Outstanding Lineman Award – Herb Gray (DE), Winnipeg Blue Bombers
- Jeff Russel Memorial Trophy (Eastern MVP) – Ron Stewart (RB), Ottawa Rough Riders
- Jeff Nicklin Memorial Trophy (WIFU MVP) – Jackie Parker (QB), Edmonton Eskimos
- Gruen Trophy (Eastern Rookie of the Year) – Bill Mitchell (G/LB), Toronto Argonauts
- DeMarco–Becket Memorial Trophy (WIFU Outstanding Lineman) – Frank Rigney (OT), Winnipeg Blue Bombers

== 1960 Miss Grey Cup ==
- Miss Edmonton Eskimos Mary-Jo Powell was named Miss Grey Cup 1960
