= Vic Chapman =

Canadian press secretary and football player (1932–1987)

No. 85, 75, 74
- Positions: Punter, End

Personal information
- Born: April 28, 1932; Vancouver, British Columbia
- Died: December 21, 1987 (aged 55); Ottawa, Ontario
- Listed height: 6 ft 0 in (1.83 m)
- Listed weight: 200 lb (91 kg)

Career information
- High school: King George High School
- CJFL: Vancouver Blue Bombers
- College: UBC

Career history
- 1952: Calgary Stampeders
- 1954–1958: BC Lions
- 1959–1962: Edmonton Eskimos
- 1962: Montreal Alouettes

Awards and highlights
- 2x WIFU All-Star (1957, 1958)

Victor Garbutt Chapman (April 28, 1932 – December 21, 1987) was a Canadian press secretary who worked for Prime Minister Pierre Trudeau and the British royal family. He previously played professional football with the Calgary Stampeders, BC Lions, Edmonton Eskimos, and Montreal Alouettes of the Canadian Football League.

== Football ==
=== Early career ===
Chapman was an all-star halfback at King George High School. He enrolled at the University of British Columbia and played right end for the UBC Thunderbirds football team, but left the team after one game and joined the Vancouver Blue Bombers junior football team. Chapman signed with the Calgary Stampeders in 1952, but was released on September 5 and rejoined the Blue Bombers.

=== BC Lions ===
In 1954, Chapman joined the expansion BC Lions. He was the team's punter and averaged 38 yards on 100 punts. He was re-signed for the 1955 season and averaged 42.3 yards per punt while also playing wingback. He averaged 42.4 yards per punt in 1956. In 1957, Chapman averaged a Western Interprovincial Football Union-leading 42.4 yards per punt, scored three receiving touchdowns, and intercepted four passes, including a pick six against the Stampeders. He played for the Western Interprovincial Football Union team in the 1957 All-Star Game. His two singles were the only points the West scored in the 20–2 loss. In 1958, quarterback George Herring replaced Chapman as the team's primary punter. That year, Chapman had a career high 368 receiving yards and scored the Lions' only touchdown in a 10–8 victory over the Winnipeg Blue Bombers. He once again appeared in the All-Star Game, where he kicked three singles in the West's 9–3 victory.

=== Edmonton Eskimos ===
On March 4, 1959, the Lions traded Chapman to the Edmonton Eskimos for linebacker Ted Tully. He was the team's punter and averaged 40.7 yards on a career-high 132 punts. He averaged 40.7 yards per punt again in 1960 and was a member of the Eskimos team that played in the 48th Grey Cup. In 1961, Chapman caught 17 passes for 299 yards, but lost the punting job to Bobby Walden. He returned to Edmonton for the 1962 season and had 2 catches for 21 yards and averaged 42.5 yards on 73 punts.

=== Montreal Alouettes ===
On September 25, 1962, the Eskimos traded Chapman to the Montreal Alouettes for the team's first round pick in the 1963 CFL draft. Edmonton needed a roster spot to make room for Gino Fracas, who was coming off of the injury list, and saw Chapman, who did not play much on offence, as expendable. Chapman chose to retire, as he did not want to move or commute to Montreal. However, he joined the Alouettes for a road game in Winnipeg and for the Eastern Finals.

== Post-playing career ==
In 1964, Chapman joined CFRN-TV as a salesman and sports announcer. He was also a colour commentator for the CFL on CTV's western broadcast crew. In 1967, he was the project officer for the Centennial Voyageur Canoe Pageant, a 3,300-mile canoe race organized to promote the Canadian Centennial.

== Press secretary ==
=== Prime minister's office ===
Chapman worked for the John Turner campaign during the 1968 Liberal Party of Canada leadership election. Turner lost the election to Pierre Trudeau, who hired Chapman as an assistant press secretary during a reorganization of the prime minister's office that July. He organized the logistics for the prime minister's official tours and campaign trips. In 1969, he assisted press secretary Roméo LeBlanc during John Lennon and Yoko Ono's visit with the prime minister. He accompanied Trudeau when the Prime Minister met with President Richard Nixon at the Moses-Saunders Power Dam in 1969 and the White House in 1970. In 1970, he arranged a date between Trudeau and Barbra Streisand. In 1973, he helped organize the Commonwealth Heads of Government Meeting, which was in Ottawa. Chapman was loaned out to the Department of External Affairs for Soviet Premier Alexei Kosygin and Queen Elizabeth II visits to Canada. He resigned from the prime minister's office effective February 4, 1974, to join a newly-formed public relations firm, Intertask Ltd.

=== Post-government career ===
Chapman founded Intertask with parliamentary reporter Paul Akehurst. The company managed a variety of aspects of Habitat I, organized a series of conferences to explain the Anti-Inflation Act, and produced a series of films on government practices for the National Film Board. Chapman left Intertask in December 1976 to start his own consulting business. He helped promote the 1979 Can-Am Bowl, a college all-star game pitting seniors from the United States against seniors from Canada played at Tampa Stadium in Tampa, Florida.

=== British royal family ===
Chapman was the media organizer for British royal family during their tours of Canada. He handled Prince Charles' 1977 and 1979 trips, Elizabeth II's Silver Jubilee tour, Queen Elizabeth The Queen Mother's 1979 visit, Princess Margaret's 1980 tour, and Elizabeth II's 1982 visit. During the Queen's 1978 tour, Chapman got into a physical confrontation with a military policeman at CFB Namao after the soldier shoved one of Chapman's female assistants. During her 1982 visit, he removed reporter Claude Papineau from the press pool after he broke custom and directly quoted the Queen in an article.

In 1982, Chapman was named assistant press secretary to Queen Elizabeth II, a post traditionally filled by an appointee from a Commonwealth country. He also served as the press secretary for the Prince and Princess of Wales. In 1987, he was refused entry to a Madrid conference where Prince Charles was scheduled to speak due to a misunderstanding over official passes. He was let in after intervention from British Embassy staff. During that same trip, Chapman expressed unhappiness over the Spanish press' disclosure of off-the-record remarks made by Prince Charles and warned that it "would put in jeopardy future media receptions". He resigned in 1987 after he was diagnosed with cancer.

== Personal life ==
Chapman's 28-year-old wife, Mary, died on September 2, 1970, after a brief illness. In 1982, he married his fourth wife, Cecile, whom he had lived with for eight years. It was reported that the marriage took place because the Queen would not approve of their cohabitation, a charge Chapman denied. Chapman was the father of seven children.

== Death ==
In December 1987, Chapman entered the Ottawa Civic Hospital cancer clinic for treatment for lung cancer. He died on December 21, 1987.
