= 1960 Calgary Stampeders season =

Canadian football team season

- General manager: Jim Finks
- Head coach: Otis Douglas (0–2–1) (to August 19); Jim Finks (0–1) (August 20 to August 22); Steve Owen (6–5–1) (from August 23)
- Home stadium: McMahon Stadium

Results
- Record: 6–8–2
- Division place: 3rd, West
- Playoffs: Lost West Semi-Finals

The 1960 Calgary Stampeders finished in third place in the W.I.F.U. with a 6–8–2 record. They were defeated in the West Semi-Finals by the Edmonton Eskimos.

This was the first season at McMahon Stadium for the Stamps.

== Regular season ==
=== Season standings ===
Western Interprovincial Football Union
Team	GP	W	L	T	PF	PA	Pts
Winnipeg Blue Bombers	16	14	2	0	453	239	28
Edmonton Eskimos	16	10	6	0	318	225	20
Calgary Stampeders	16	6	8	2	374	404	14
BC Lions	16	5	9	2	296	356	12
Saskatchewan Roughriders	16	2	12	2	205	422	6

== Preseason ==
Game	Date	Opponent	Results		Venue	Attendance
Game	Date	Opponent	Score	Record	Venue	Attendance
A	Wed, July 20	Edmonton Eskimos	W 17–4	1–0		
B	Wed, July 27	at Toronto Argonauts	L 30–51	0–1		12,692

== Schedule ==
Week	Game	Date	Opponent	Results		Venue	Attendance
Week	Game	Date	Opponent	Score	Record	Venue	Attendance
	1	Fri, Aug 12	at Saskatchewan Roughriders	T 15–15	0–0–1	Taylor Field	13,192
	2	Mon, Aug 15	vs. Winnipeg Blue Bombers	L 23–38	0–1–1	McMahon Stadium	20,450
	3	Thu, Aug 18	at Winnipeg Blue Bombers	L 7–50	0–2–1	Winnipeg Stadium	18,389
	4	Mon, Aug 22	vs. BC Lions	L 19–26	0–3–1	McMahon Stadium	
	5	Mon, Aug 29	vs. Saskatchewan Roughriders	W 23–15	1–3–1	McMahon Stadium	13,500
	6	Mon, Sept 5	vs. Edmonton Eskimos	L 28–29	1–4–1	McMahon Stadium	
	7	Sat, Sept 10	at Edmonton Eskimos	L 10–41	1–5–1	Clarke Stadium	17,993
	8	Mon, Sept 12	at BC Lions	T 21–21	1–5–2	Empire Stadium	27,759
	9	Mon, Sept 19	vs. Winnipeg Blue Bombers	L 17–19	1–6–2	McMahon Stadium	14,000
	10	Sat, Sept 24	vs. BC Lions	W 28–14	2–6–2	McMahon Stadium	13,000
	11	Mon, Sept 26	at Saskatchewan Roughriders	L 35–45	2–7–2	Taylor Field	
	12	Sat, Oct 1	at Winnipeg Blue Bombers	L 21–31	2–8–2	Winnipeg Stadium	15,968
	13	Wed, Oct 5	vs. Saskatchewan Roughriders	W 39–22	2–9–2	McMahon Stadium	11,000
	14	Sat, Oct 8	at Edmonton Eskimos	W 31–11	3–9–2	Clarke Stadium	15,500
	15	Sat, Oct 15	vs. Edmonton Eskimos	W 35–17	4–9–2	McMahon Stadium	17,000
	16	Sat, Oct 22	at BC Lions	W 22–10	5–9–2	Empire Stadium	29,599

=== 1960 playoffs ===
Western Conference Semi-Finals (two-game, total points series)

Round	Date	Opponent	Results		Venue	Attendance
Round	Date	Opponent	Score	Record	Venue	Attendance
West Semi-final No. 1	Wed, Nov 2	at Edmonton Eskimos	L 7–30	0–1	Clarke Stadium	16,018
West Semi-final No. 2	Sat, Nov 5	vs. Edmonton Eskimos	L 21–40	0–2	McMahon Stadium	20,000

- Calgary lost the series 70–28. Edmonton advanced to play the Winnipeg Blue Bombers in the Western Conference Finals.

== Awards and records ==
- Tony Pajaczkowski, runner-up to Ron Stewart of the Ottawa Rough Riders for the CFL Outstanding Canadian Schenley Award.
