= 1960 Toronto Argonauts season =

CFL team season

- Head coach: Lou Agase
- Home stadium: Exhibition Stadium

Results
- Record: 10–4
- Division place: 1st, East
- Playoffs: Lost Eastern Finals

The 1960 Toronto Argonauts finished in first place in the Eastern Conference with a 10–4 record. Their first-place finish earned them a bye to the Eastern Finals. The Argonauts lost both games of the two-game, total point Finals to the eventual Grey Cup champion Ottawa Rough Riders.

== Preseason ==
After playing (and losing to) the NFL Chicago Cardinals in 1959, the Argonauts hosted the NFL Pittsburgh Steelers at CNE Stadium on August 3 in the second of three interleague games hosted in Toronto and lost 43–16. Both teams used 12 players, with a handful of NFL rules (blocking, punt returns) blended into the Canadian game.

=== Schedule ===
Game	Date	Opponent	Results		Venue	Attendance
Game	Date	Opponent	Score	Record	Venue	Attendance
A	July 27	vs. Calgary Stampeders	W 51–30	1–0	Exhibition Stadium	12,692
B	August 3	vs. Pittsburgh Steelers (NFL)	L 16–43	1–1	Exhibition Stadium	23,570
C	August 10	vs. Hamilton Tiger-Cats	W 14–7	2–1	Exhibition Stadium	10,282

== Regular season ==
=== Standings ===
Eastern Football Conference
Team	GP	W	L	T	PF	PA	Pts
Toronto Argonauts	14	10	4	0	370	265	20
Ottawa Rough Riders	14	9	5	0	400	283	18
Montreal Alouettes	14	5	9	0	340	458	10
Hamilton Tiger-Cats	14	4	10	0	273	377	8

=== Schedule ===
Week	Game	Date	Opponent	Results		Venue	Attendance
Week	Game	Date	Opponent	Score	Record	Venue	Attendance
1	1	August 16	at Ottawa Rough Riders	W 21–7	1–0	Landsdowne Park	20,321
1	2	August 19	vs. Montreal Alouettes	W 36–14	2–0	Exhibition Stadium	26,524
2	3	August 26	at Montreal Alouettes	W 29–28	3–0	Molson Stadium	24,533
3	4	September 5	at Hamilton Tiger-Cats	W 32–21	4–0	Civic Stadium	26,253
4	5	September 11	vs. Hamilton Tiger-Cats	W 16–12	5–0	Exhibition Stadium	30,863
5	6	September 14	at Ottawa Rough Riders	L 12–21	5–1	Landsdowne Park	20,477
5	7	September 18	vs. Ottawa Rough Riders	L 12–26	5–2	Exhibition Stadium	30,949
6	8	September 24	at Montreal Alouettes	W 21–9	6–2	Molson Stadium	23,452
7	9	October 1	vs. Montreal Alouettes	W 50–15	7–2	Exhibition Stadium	24,145
8	10	October 7	vs. Hamilton Tiger-Cats	W 24–14	8–2	Exhibition Stadium	27,494
9	11	October 10	at Hamilton Tiger-Cats	L 16–20	8–3	Civic Stadium	25,873
10	12	October 16	vs. Ottawa Rough Riders	W 37–13	9–3	Exhibition Stadium	32,896
11	13	October 22	at Ottawa Rough Riders	L 1–38	9–4	Landsdowne Park	19,119
12	14	October 30	vs. Montreal Alouettes	W 63–27	10–4	Exhibition Stadium	26,069

== Playoffs ==
=== IRFU Finals ===
(two game, total point series)

Round	Date	Opponent	Results		Venue	Attendance
Round	Date	Opponent	Score	Record	Venue	Attendance
IRFU Final Game 1	Nov 12	at Ottawa Rough Riders	L 21–33	0–1	Landsdowne Park	18,385
IRFU Final Game 2	Nov 20	vs. Ottawa Rough Riders	L 21–20	0–2	Exhibition Stadium	30,529

- Ottawa won the series 54–41. Ottawa advanced to play the Edmonton Eskimos in the Grey Cup.

== Schenley Award nominees ==
Player	Canadian	Lineman
Cookie Gilchrist	Bill Mitchell	Dick Fouts

- Cookie Gilchrist was the Eastern nominee for CFL Most Outstanding Player Schenley Award, but lost the award to Jackie Parker of the Edmonton Eskimos. Parker received 37 votes; Gilchrist received 33.
