= Tony Jeter =

American football player (born 1944)

- Born: September 8, 1944 (age 82); Steubenville, Ohio, U.S.
- Education: University of Nebraska–Lincoln
- Relatives: Bob Jeter (brother); Rob Jeter (nephew)
- Football career

Profile
- Position: Tight end

Career information
- College: University of Nebraska–Lincoln
- NFL draft: 1966: 3rd round

Career history
- Green Bay Packers; Pittsburgh Steelers

Awards and highlights
- 2× First-team All-Big Eight (1964, 1965)
- Stats at Pro Football Reference

Tony Jeter (born September 8, 1944) is an American former professional football player who was a tight end in the National Football League (NFL).

== Biography ==
Jeter was born Anthony John Jeter on September 8, 1944, in Steubenville, Ohio. He is the brother of former Green Bay Packers Pro Bowler Bob Jeter, and the uncle of Milwaukee Panthers men's basketball head coach Rob Jeter.

== Career ==
Jeter was drafted by the Packers in the third round of the 1966 NFL draft and later played two seasons with the Pittsburgh Steelers. He had also been drafted by the Oakland Raiders in the tenth round of the 1966 American Football League draft.

He played at the collegiate level at the University of Nebraska–Lincoln.

== See also ==
- List of family relations in American football
