= Kyle Capobianco =

Canadian ice hockey player (born 1997)

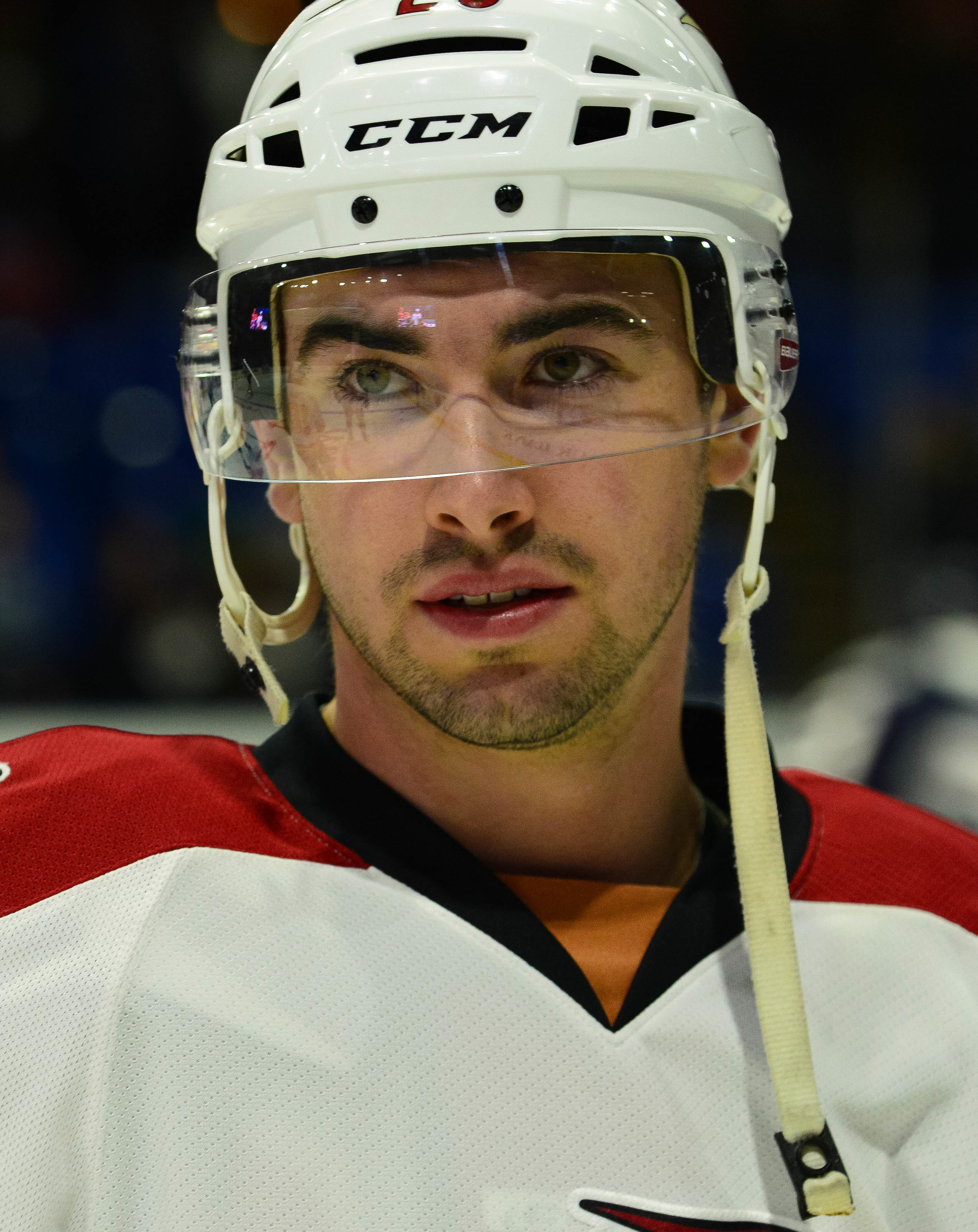
- Capobianco with the Tucson Roadrunners in 2018
- Born: August 13, 1997 (age 29) Mississauga, Ontario, Canada
- Height: 6 ft 3 in (191 cm)
- Weight: 194 lb (88 kg; 13 st 12 lb)
- Position: Defence
- Shoots: Left
- NHL team Former teams: Dallas Stars; Arizona Coyotes; Winnipeg Jets
- NHL draft: 63rd overall, 2015; Arizona Coyotes
- Playing career: 2017–present

Kyle Capobianco (born August 13, 1997) is a Canadian professional ice hockey player who is a defenceman for the Dallas Stars of the National Hockey League (NHL). He was the 63rd overall selection of the Arizona Coyotes at the 2015 NHL entry draft. Capobianco's grandfather, Clare Exelby, is a former CFL player and uncle, Randy Exelby, is a former NHL player.

== Playing career ==
=== Junior ===
Capobianco played four seasons of junior hockey with the Sudbury Wolves of the Ontario Hockey League. The Coyotes selected him after his 2014–15 season, wherein he scored 10 goals and 30 assists in 68 games, for a total of 40 points.

=== Professional ===
The Coyotes returned Capobianco to junior hockey for both seasons after drafting him, but upon the completion of the 2016–17 OHL season, Capobianco was called up to the AHL in order to play for the Tucson Roadrunners. Capobianco ended up playing four games for the Roadrunners, scoring zero points. The Arizona Coyotes signed Capobianco to a three-year entry-level contract on June 30, 2017.

At the beginning of the 2017–18 season, Capobianco was assigned to the Tucson Roadrunners. On December 4, 2017, Capobianco was recalled to the Arizona Coyotes. On December 7, 2017, he made his NHL debut for the Arizona Coyotes against the Boston Bruins, earning no points and a –1 rating in 13:33 of ice time. He was assigned to the Coyotes AHL affiliate shortly after. His demotion was short lived as Capobianco was recalled to the NHL on January 1, 2018.

Capobianco was selected for the 2018 AHL All-Star Game as a replacement for San Antonio Rampage defencemen Jordan Schmaltz. As a restricted free agent, Capobianco remained with the Coyotes by agreeing to a two-year, $1.55 million contract extension on October 5, 2020.

As a free agent from the Coyotes, Capobianco was signed to a two-year, $1.525 million contract with the Winnipeg Jets on July 14, 2022.

During his second year within the organization while playing for the Jets AHL affiliate, the Manitoba Moose in the 2023–24 season, Capobianco won the Eddie Shore Award as the AHL's top defenseman. He was also selected as a First Team AHL All-Star, and played in the 2024 AHL All-Star Classic, his fourth appearance at that event.

At the conclusion of his contract with the Jets, Capobianco left as a free agent and was signed to a two-year contract with the Dallas Stars on July 1, 2024.

== International play ==
Medal record

Representing Canada

Ice hockey

IIHF World U18 Championships
Bronze medal – third place	2015 Switzerland	

Capobianco represented Canada at the 2015 U18 World Championships, where he scored 1 goal and 1 assist in 7 games.

== Career statistics ==
=== Regular season and playoffs ===
			Regular season					Playoffs
Season	Team	League	GP	G	A	Pts	PIM	GP	G	A	Pts	PIM
2012–13	Oakville Blades	OJHL	3	0	1	1	12	—	—	—	—	—
2013–14	Sudbury Wolves	OHL	53	0	11	11	18	5	0	0	0	0
2014–15	Sudbury Wolves	OHL	68	10	30	40	54	—	—	—	—	—
2015–16	Sudbury Wolves	OHL	68	7	36	43	58	—	—	—	—	—
2016–17	Sudbury Wolves	OHL	65	10	37	47	66	6	0	3	3	10
2016–17	Tucson Roadrunners	AHL	4	0	0	0	0	—	—	—	—	—
2017–18	Tucson Roadrunners	AHL	49	2	28	30	36	9	0	0	0	2
2017–18	Arizona Coyotes	NHL	1	0	0	0	0	—	—	—	—	—
2018–19	Tucson Roadrunners	AHL	40	7	25	32	51	—	—	—	—	—
2018–19	Arizona Coyotes	NHL	2	0	0	0	0	—	—	—	—	—
2019–20	Tucson Roadrunners	AHL	42	10	27	37	47	—	—	—	—	—
2019–20	Arizona Coyotes	NHL	9	1	0	1	2	—	—	—	—	—
2020–21	Arizona Coyotes	NHL	2	0	0	0	2	—	—	—	—	—
2020–21	Tucson Roadrunners	AHL	20	2	11	13	22	1	0	0	0	0
2021–22	Arizona Coyotes	NHL	45	2	7	9	38	—	—	—	—	—
2022–23	Winnipeg Jets	NHL	14	2	0	2	6	1	0	0	0	0
2023–24	Manitoba Moose	AHL	69	12	42	54	46	2	0	2	2	0
2024–25	Texas Stars	AHL	64	7	43	50	72	14	2	11	13	10
2024–25	Dallas Stars	NHL	1	0	0	0	4	—	—	—	—	—
2025–26	Texas Stars	AHL	5	1	3	4	4	—	—	—	—	—
2025–26	Dallas Stars	NHL	33	2	3	5	8	—	—	—	—	—
NHL totals			107	7	10	17	60	1	0	0	0	0

=== International ===
Year	Team	Event	Result	GP	G	A	Pts	PIM
2014	Canada Ontario	U17	5th	5	1	0	1	0
2015	Canada	U18	3rd place, bronze medalist(s)	7	1	1	2	2
Junior totals				12	2	1	3	2
