= Keith Webster (Canadian football) =

Retired Canadian football player

Profile
- Position: Halfback

Personal information
- Born: August 31, 1937 (age 89)
- Listed height: 5 ft 8 in (1.73 m)
- Listed weight: 180 lb (82 kg)

Career history
- 1959–1960: Winnipeg Blue Bombers

Awards and highlights
- Grey Cup champion (1959)

Keith Webster (born August 31, 1937) is a retired Canadian football player who played for the Winnipeg Blue Bombers. He won the Grey Cup with Winnipeg in 1959. He played junior football with Daniel McIntyre Collegiate Institute in Winnipeg, previously.
