= 1960 BC Lions season =

Canadian football team season

- General manager: Herb Capozzi
- Head coach: Wayne Robinson
- Home stadium: Empire Stadium

Results
- Record: 5–9–2
- Division place: 4th, West
- Playoffs: did not qualify

Uniform

The 1960 BC Lions finished the season in fourth place in the W.I.F.U. with a 5–9–2 record. Coming off of last season's success, the fan attendance continued to be strong, with most games close or over 30,000 fans per game. However, due to inconsistent quarterbacking from Jim Walden and Randy Duncan, the Lions failed to make the playoffs in consecutive seasons.

On the bright side, running back Willie Fleming made the All-Star team with a team record 1,051 yards rushing for an astounding 8.4 yards per carry average. The Winnipeg Blue Bombers continued their dominance over the Lions, sweeping all four games and improving their all time mark to 24–4 versus BC.

== Regular season ==
=== Season standings ===
Western Interprovincial Football Union
Team	GP	W	L	T	PF	PA	Pts
Winnipeg Blue Bombers	16	14	2	0	453	239	28
Edmonton Eskimos	16	10	6	0	318	225	20
Calgary Stampeders	16	6	8	2	374	404	14
BC Lions	16	5	9	2	296	356	12
Saskatchewan Roughriders	16	2	12	2	205	422	6

=== Preseason ===
Game	Date	Opponent	Results		Venue	Attendance
Game	Date	Opponent	Score	Record	Venue	Attendance
A	Wed, July 20	vs. Montreal Alouettes	T 29–29	0–0–1	Empire Stadium	24,392
B	Tue, July 26	at Montreal Alouettes	W 49–7	1–0–1	McGill Stadium	19,999
C	Fri, July 29	vs. Winnipeg Blue Bombers	L 7–13	1–1–1	Kingston Stadium	12,583
D	Tue, Aug 2	vs. Ottawa Rough Riders	W 27–26	2–1–1	Empire Stadium	18,156

- Game vs. Winnipeg in Cedar Rapids, Iowa

=== Season schedule ===
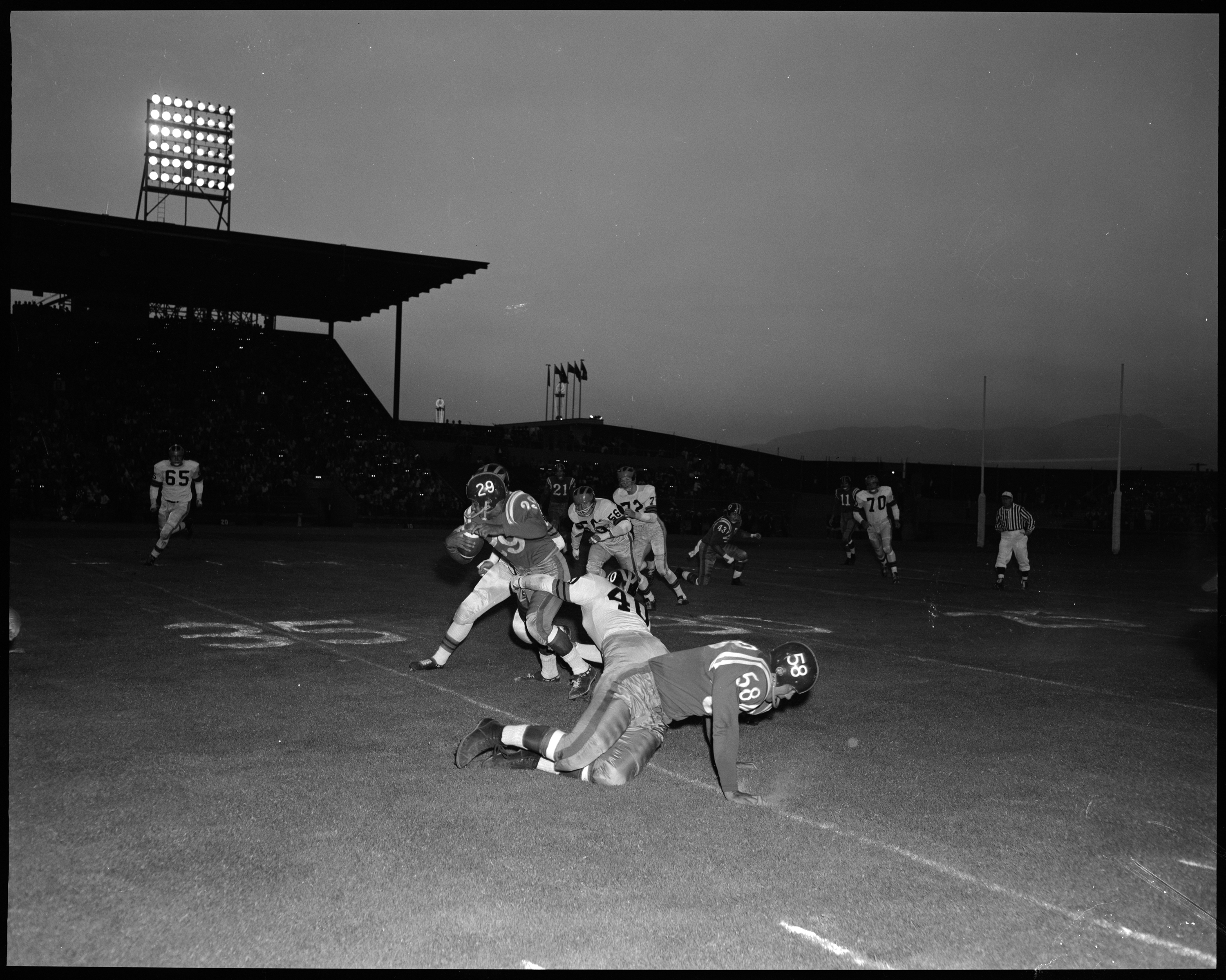
BC Lions vs. Winnipeg Blue Bombers, August 11

Week	Game	Date	Opponent	Results		Venue	Attendance
Week	Game	Date	Opponent	Score	Record	Venue	Attendance
1	1	Thu, Aug 11	vs. Winnipeg Blue Bombers	L 21–35	0–1	Empire Stadium	31,837
1	2	Mon, Aug 15	at Edmonton Eskimos	L 14–33	0–2	Clarke Stadium	17,500
2	3	Sat, Aug 20	vs. Saskatchewan Roughriders	W 27–12	1–2	Empire Stadium	29,532
2	4	Mon, Aug 22	at Calgary Stampeders	W 26–19	2–2	McMahon Stadium	13,000
3	5	Mon, Aug 29	vs. Edmonton Eskimos	L 0–26	2–3	Empire Stadium	28,420
4	6	Thu, Sept 1	at Winnipeg Blue Bombers	L 14–19	2–4	Winnipeg Stadium	18,297
4	7	Mon, Sept 5	at Saskatchewan Roughriders	W 31–21	3–4	Taylor Field	14,105
5	8	Mon, Sept 12	vs. Calgary Stampeders	T 21–21	3–4–1	Empire Stadium	27,759
6	9	Sat, Sept 17	vs. Winnipeg Blue Bombers	L 14–26	3–5–1	Empire Stadium	30,292
6	10	Mon, Sept 19	at Edmonton Eskimos	L 10–18	3–6–1	Clarke Stadium	
7	11	Sat, Sept 24	at Calgary Stampeders	L 14–28	3–7–1	McMahon Stadium	13,000
Bye
9	12	Thu, Oct 6	vs. Edmonton Eskimos	W 21–13	4–7–1	Empire Stadium	21,707
10	13	Thu, Oct 13	at Winnipeg Blue Bombers	L 21–49	4–8–1	Winnipeg Stadium	16,773
10	14	Sat, Oct 15	at Saskatchewan Roughriders	T 14–14	4–8–2	Taylor Field	7,255
11	15	Sat, Oct 22	vs. Calgary Stampeders	L 10–22	4–9–2	Empire Stadium	29,599
12	16	Sat, Oct 29	vs. Saskatchewan Roughriders	W 38–0	5–9–2	Empire Stadium	21,114

=== Offensive leaders ===
Player	Passing yds	Rushing yds	Receiving yds	TD
Jim Walden	828	384	0	0
Randy Duncan	734	50	0	0
Willie Fleming	124	1051	399	10
Nub Beamer		715	51	3
By Bailey		342	156	3

== 1960 CFL awards ==
Neal Beaumont won the CFL Rookie of the Year Award. The trophy at that time was known as the Dr. Beattie Martin Trophy.
