= Randy Exelby =

Canadian ice hockey player (born 1965)

- Born: August 13, 1965 (age 60) Toronto, Ontario, Canada
- Height: 5 ft 9 in (175 cm)
- Weight: 170 lb (77 kg; 12 st 2 lb)
- Position: Goaltender
- Caught: Left
- Played for: Montreal Canadiens; Edmonton Oilers
- NHL draft: 1986 NHL Supplemental Draft; Montreal Canadiens
- Playing career: 1987–1991

Randy Alan Exelby (born August 13, 1965) is a Canadian former professional ice hockey goaltender. He played in two games in the National Hockey League, one for the Montreal Canadiens in 1989 and one for the Edmonton Oilers in 1990. The rest of his career, which lasted from 1987 to 1991 was spent in the minor leagues.

== Biography ==
Exelby was born in Toronto, Ontario. His father, Clare Exelby, is a former Canadian Football League player. His nephew Kyle Capobianco is also a professional ice hockey player.

As a youth, Exelby played in the 1978 Quebec International Pee-Wee Hockey Tournament with the Toronto Shopsy's minor ice hockey team with future NHL goalie Bob Essensa.

Exelby made his NHL debut on January 27, 1989, against the Buffalo Sabres. He entered the game in the second period when the starting goalie, Patrick Roy, had to go to the washroom. He won the Rob Capellupo Award while playing for the Phoenix Roadrunners.

In 1994, he started a chain of hockey equipment shops in the Phoenix, Arizona area called "Behind the Mask". It currently operates in three full-service retail stores. He had three team shops at all three Polar Ice locations and all three rinks are under the new ownership of AZ Ice and the Chandler location now the Peoria and Gilbert locations are now operated by Ice Den of Chandler.

== Career statistics ==
=== Regular season and playoffs ===
			Regular season									Playoffs
Season	Team	League	GP	W	L	T	MIN	GA	SO	GAA	SV%	GP	W	L	MIN	GA	SO	GAA	SV%
1981–82	Richmond Hill Rams	COJHL	27	—	—	—	1593	127	1	4.78	—	—	—	—	—	—	—	—	—
1982–83	Streetsville Derbys	COJHL	17	—	—	—	971	64	0	3.96	—	—	—	—	—	—	—	—	—
1982–83	Richmond Hill Dynes	COJHL	3	0	3	0	160	22	0	8.07	—	—	—	—	—	—	—	—	—
1983–84	Lake Superior State University	CCHA	21	6	10	0	905	75	0	4.97	—	—	—	—	—	—	—	—	—
1984–85	Lake Superior State University	CCHA	36	22	11	1	1999	112	0	3.36	—	—	—	—	—	—	—	—	—
1985–86	Lake Superior State University	CCHA	28	14	11	1	1625	98	0	3.62	—	—	—	—	—	—	—	—	—
1986–87	Lake Superior State University	CCHA	28	12	9	1	1357	91	0	4.02	—	—	—	—	—	—	—	—	—
1987–88	Sherbrooke Canadiens	AHL	19	7	10	0	1050	49	0	2.80	—	4	2	2	212	13	0	3.68	—
1988–89	Montreal Canadiens	NHL	1	0	0	0	3	0	0	0.00	1.000	—	—	—	—	—	—	—	—
1988–89	Sherbrooke Canadiens	AHL	52	31	13	6	2935	146	6	2.98	—	6	1	4	329	24	0	4.38	—
1989–90	Edmonton Oilers	NHL	1	0	1	0	60	5	0	5.01	.828	—	—	—	—	—	—	—	—
1989–90	Phoenix Roadrunners	IHL	41	11	18	5	2146	163	0	4.56	—	—	—	—	—	—	—	—	—
1990–91	Springfield Indians	AHL	4	1	2	1	245	20	0	4.90	—	—	—	—	—	—	—	—	—
1990–91	Kansas City Blades	IHL	16	0	13	0	785	65	0	4.97	—	—	—	—	—	—	—	—	—
1990–91	Louisville IceHawks	ECHL	13	6	5	1	743	60	0	4.84	—	—	—	—	—	—	—	—	—
NHL totals			2	0	1	0	63	5	0	4.77	.833	—	—	—	—	—	—	—	—

Awards and achievements
Preceded by Wendell Young	Aldege "Baz" Bastien Memorial Award; 1988–89	Succeeded by Jean-Claude Bergeron
