= Buddy Tinsley =

American gridiron football player (1924–2011)

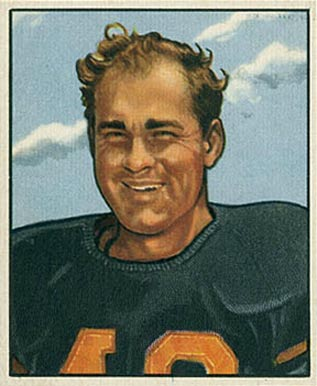
- Tinsley on a 1950 Bowman football card

No. 64
- Position: Defensive tackle

Personal information
- Born: August 16, 1924; Damon, Texas, U.S.
- Died: September 14, 2011 (aged 87); Winnipeg, Manitoba, Canada

Career information
- College: Baylor
- NFL draft: 1948: 7th round, 54th overall pick

Career history
- 1949: Los Angeles Dons
- 1950–1960: Winnipeg Blue Bombers

Awards and highlights
- 2× Grey Cup champion (1958, 1959); 7× CFL West All-Star (1950–1952, 1955–1958); Second-team All-SWC (1947); Manitoba Sports Hall of Fame (1994)
- Stats at Pro Football Reference
- Canadian Football Hall of Fame (Class of 1982)

Robert Porter "Buddy" Tinsley (August 16, 1924 – September 14, 2011) was a Canadian Football League (CFL) offensive lineman for the Winnipeg Blue Bombers. He was inducted into the Canadian Football Hall of Fame in 1982, and was a member of the Winnipeg Blue Bombers Hall of Fame, the Manitoba Sports Hall of Fame and the Baylor University Hall of Fame.

Tinsley was born in Damon, Texas and played collegiately at Baylor. He spent one season with the NFL's Los Angeles Rams before joining the Blue Bombers, where he often played both ways at tackle.

He is noted for a story regarding the 38th Grey Cup, known as the "Mud Bowl" because of poor weather/field conditions. "As the legend goes, Tinsley, a rookie Bomber lineman, was face down in the muck and water, gasping for breath when an alert official pulled him from his murky grave".

Tinsley died on September 14, 2011, aged 87, from undisclosed causes, in Winnipeg, Manitoba.
