= Clare Exelby =

Canadian football player

Profile
- Position: Halfback

Personal information
- Born: November 5, 1938 (age 88); Toronto, Ontario, Canada
- Listed height: 5 ft 11 in (1.80 m)
- Listed weight: 180 lb (82 kg)

Career history
- 1958–1959: Toronto Argonauts
- 1960: Calgary Stampeders
- 1961–1963: Toronto Argonauts
- 1964–1965: Montreal Alouettes

Awards and highlights
- CFL West All-Star (1960)

Clare Exelby (born November 5, 1938) is a Canadian former professional football player who played for the Calgary Stampeders, Toronto Argonauts and Montreal Alouettes. Exelby's son, Randy Exelby, is a former NHL player and grandson, Kyle Capobianco, currently plays for the Dallas Stars.
