= Keith Webster (English footballer) =

English footballer

Personal information
- Full name: Keith Webster
- Date of birth: 6 November 1945 (age 80)
- Place of birth: Stockton-on-Tees, England
- Position: Winger

Youth career
- Stockton

Senior career*
Years	Team	Apps	(Gls)
1962–1966	Newcastle United	0	(0)
1966–1967	Darlington	9	(0)
1967–19??	Stockton		
1970–1974	Brunswick Juventus		
1975–1976	Fitzroy United Alexander		
1977–1979	Frankston City		
- * Club domestic league appearances and goals

Keith Webster (born 6 November 1945) is an English former footballer who played as a winger in the Football League for Darlington.

Webster was born in Stockton-on-Tees, County Durham, (Note: Some sources, including the Hugman's Footballers website, give Webster's birthplace as Newcastle upon Tyne, but this is incompatible with a birth registered in Durham South-east.) where he attended Stockton Grammar School. He signed professionally for Newcastle United in 1962, and remained with the club for four seasons, but never played for their first team. Webster joined Third Division club Darlington in 1966, and after nine matches during the 1966–67 Football League season, he moved into non-league football with hometown club Stockton.

He moved to Australia, where he played in the Victorian State League for Brunswick Juventus, with whom he won the title in 1970, as well as for Fitzroy United Alexander and Frankston City, before taking up coaching.
