= Don Duncalfe =

Canadian football player

Profile
- Position: Tackle

Personal information
- Born: c. 1939 (age 86–87); Wetaskiwin, Alberta
- Listed height: 6 ft 3 in (1.91 m)
- Listed weight: 220 lb (100 kg)

Career history
- 1959–1963: Edmonton Elks

Don Duncalfe (born c. 1939) is a retired Canadian football player who played for the Edmonton Elks.
