= 1960 Ottawa Rough Riders season =

Canadian football team season

- Owner: Sam Berger
- General manager: George Terlep
- Head coach: Frank Clair
- Home stadium: Lansdowne Park

Results
- Record: 9–5
- Division place: 2nd, East
- Playoffs: Won Grey Cup

The 1960 Ottawa Rough Riders finished in second place in the Interprovincial Rugby Football Union with a 9–5 record and won the Grey Cup.

== Preseason ==
Week	Date	Opponent	Result	Record
A	July 26	vs. Saskatchewan Roughriders	W 20–6	1–0
B	Aug 2	at BC Lions	L 26–27	1–1
B	Aug 4	at Winnipeg Blue Bombers	L 14–18	1–2
C	Aug 10	vs. Edmonton Eskimos	L 24–29	1–3

== Regular season ==
=== Standings ===
Interprovincial Rugby Football Union
Team	GP	W	L	T	PF	PA	Pts
Toronto Argonauts	14	10	4	0	370	265	20
Ottawa Rough Riders	14	9	5	0	400	283	18
Montreal Alouettes	14	5	9	0	340	458	10
Hamilton Tiger-Cats	14	4	10	0	273	377	8

=== Schedule ===
Week	Game	Date	Opponent	Result	Record
1	1	Aug 16	vs. Toronto Argonauts	L 7–21	0–1
2	2	Aug 20	at Hamilton Tiger-Cats	W 35–6	1–1
3	3	Aug 29	vs. Hamilton Tiger-Cats	W 29–21	2–1
4	4	Sept 3	vs. Montreal Alouettes	W 40–16	3–1
4	5	Sept 5	at Montreal Alouettes	L 22–39	3–2
5	6	Sept 14	vs. Toronto Argonauts	W 21–12	4–2
6	7	Sept 18	at Toronto Argonauts	W 26–12	5–2
7	8	Sept 24	at Hamilton Tiger-Cats	W 35–21	6–2
8	9	Oct 1	vs. Hamilton Tiger-Cats	L 18–27	6–3
9	10	Oct 8	vs. Montreal Alouettes	W 41–23	7–3
9	11	Oct 10	at Montreal Alouettes	W 51–21	8–3
10	12	Oct 16	at Toronto Argonauts	L 13–37	8–4
11	13	Oct 22	vs. Toronto Argonauts	W 38–1	9–4
12	14	Oct 29	at Hamilton Tiger-Cats	L 24–26	9–5

== Postseason ==
=== Playoffs ===
Round	Date	Opponent	Result	Record
East Semi-Final	Nov 5	vs. Montreal Alouettes	W 30–14	10–5
East Final #1	Nov 12	vs. Toronto Argonauts	W 33–21	11–5
East Final #2	Nov 20	at Toronto Argonauts	W 21–20	12–5
Grey Cup	Nov 26	vs. Edmonton Eskimos	W 16–6	13–5

=== Grey Cup ===
Teams	1 Q	2 Q	3 Q	4 Q	Final
Edmonton Eskimos	0	6	0	0	6
Ottawa Rough Riders	3	6	0	7	16

== Player stats ==
=== Passing ===
Player	Games Played	Attempts	Completions	Percentage	Yards	Touchdowns	Interceptions
Ron Lancaster	14	201	101	50.2%	1843	16	18
Russ Jackson	14	52	20	38.5%	222	2	3

== Awards and honours ==
- CFL's Most Outstanding Canadian Award – Ron Stewart (RB)
- Grey Cup Most Valuable Player – Ron Stewart (RB)
