= Roger Nelson (Canadian football) =

American gridiron football player (1932–1996)

No. 66
- Positions: Offensive tackle, Guard

Personal information
- Born: May 8, 1932; Wynnewood, Oklahoma, U.S.
- Died: July 29, 1996 (aged 64); Houston, Texas, U.S.
- Listed height: 6 ft 1 in (1.85 m)
- Listed weight: 225 lb (102 kg)

Career information
- College: Oklahoma
- NFL draft: 1954: 14th round, 164th overall pick

Career history

Playing
- 1954, 1956–1967: Edmonton Eskimos

Coaching
- 1963: Edmonton Eskimos (OL Coach)

Awards and highlights
- 2× Grey Cup champion (1954, 1956); CFL's Most Outstanding Lineman Award (1959); 4× All-Western Offensive tackle (1957–1960); Edmonton Eskimo Wall of Honour (1987); 2× First-team All-Big Seven (1951, 1953)
- Canadian Football Hall of Fame (Class of 1986)

Roger Nelson (May 8, 1932 – July 29, 1996) was an American and Canadian football offensive tackle and guard. He played in the Canadian Football League (CFL) for the Edmonton Eskimos from 1954 to 1967 and was a part of two Grey Cup winning teams for the Eskimos. Nelson played college football at the University of Oklahoma and was drafted in the fourteenth round of the 1954 NFL draft.

Nelson was inducted into the Canadian Football Hall of Fame in 1986, the Edmonton Eskimo Wall of Honour in 1987, and, as part of the 1954–1956 Edmonton Eskimos football teams, the Alberta Sport Hall of Fame in 2007.

His son, Mark Nelson, played for the Calgary Stampeders and the Saskatchewan Roughriders between 1980 and 1986 and has coached in both college football and the Canadian Football League. His grandson, Kyle Nelson, played tight end for the New Mexico State Aggies college football team and is currently a long snapper for the BC Lions of the CFL.
