= Gino Fracas =

Canadian football player and coach

Profile
- Positions: Linebacker, Running back

Personal information
- Born: April 28, 1930; Windsor, Ontario, Canada
- Died: October 29, 2009 (aged 79); London, Ontario, Canada
- Listed height: 5 ft 11 in (1.80 m)
- Listed weight: 205 lb (93 kg)

Career information
- University: Western Ontario Mustangs
- CFL draft: 1954: 1st round, 1st overall pick

Career history

Playing
- 1955–1962: Edmonton Eskimos

Coaching
- 1963–1966: Alberta Golden Bears
- 1967–1986: Windsor Lancers

Awards and highlights
- 2× Grey Cup champion (1955, 1956); Football Canada - CFL Award of Merit (1987); University of Western Ontario "W" Club Athletic Hall of Fame (1984); University of Windsor Alumni Sports Hall of Fame (1987); Windsor/Essex County Sports Hall of Fame (1987); OUA Football Legends Hall of Fame
- Canadian Football Hall of Fame (Class of 2011)

Gino Fracas (April 28, 1930 – October 29, 2009) was a professional Canadian football player and hall of fame CIS football coach. He was professor of Human Kinetics at the University of Windsor from 1967 to 1995.

== Early years ==
Fracas was born in Windsor, Ontario, on April 28, 1930, and attended Assumption College Catholic High School, where he was named to the All-City football team in 1947 and 1949 and to the all-Ontario team in 1948 as a halfback. He won consecutive provincial championships with his high school team and another championship with the 1950 Assumption College Junior Ontario Rugby Football Union team. He also played first base in baseball for the Windsor Sterlings in the Detroit Federation League and, in 1951, played semi-professional for the Frood Tigers in Northern Ontario.

Fracas was a running back and linebacker at the University of Western Ontario and played on the Mustangs Yates Cup championships teams in 1952 and 1953.

== Professional career ==
Fracas was drafted first overall by the Ottawa Rough Riders in 1954, but played his CFL career with the Edmonton Eskimos from 1955 to 1962 and was team captain. He won two Grey Cups in 1955 and 1956 with the Eskimos.

== Coaching career ==
After his playing career, Fracas became a university football coach. He coached the Alberta Golden Bears from 1963 to 1966 and lead them to National and Conference Championships in his final year. From 1967 to 1986 he coached the Windsor Lancers. He founded the football program in Windsor and lead the Lancers to CCIFC championship in 1969 and OUAA Championship in 1975.

== Honours and awards ==
University of Windsor's Coach of the Year Award and CIS Football Volunteer Coach of the Year were named in his honour. In 2011 he was inducted into the Canadian Football Hall of Fame.

== Death ==
Fracas died in 2009 at age 79 in London, Ontario.
