= London Lords =

Canadian football team

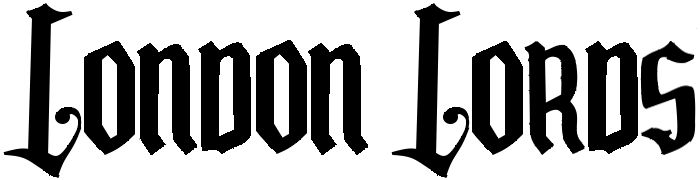
Wordmark

General information
- Founded: 1955; 71 years ago
- Folded: 1974; 52 years ago
- Stadium: Labatt Park
- Headquartered: London, Ontario
- Colours: Black, White

Personnel
- Owners: Ralph Duffus, Gordon Gilbride, Ken Lemon

League / conference affiliations
- Ontario Rugby Football Union; Senior & Intermediate

The London Lords were a professional-amateur Canadian football team competing in the Ontario Rugby Football Union (ORFU), based in London, Ontario. They played their home games at Labatt Park. They won the final ORFU Senior championship in 1957, after which pro-am teams were barred from competing for the Grey Cup, which preceded the formation of the fully professional Canadian Football League a year later in 1958. They subsequently continued to play ORFU Intermediate football for almost two decades afterward, until the league formally folded in 1974.

The Lords were owned by a community group headed by local businessmen Ralph Duffus, Gordon Gilbride, and Ken Lemon, and the team was established with the intention of eventually bringing a Canadian Football League (CFL) team to London. During their existence, the Lords were a farm team for the Hamilton Tiger-Cats, with the Tiger-Cats having their first refusal on call-up/contracts on any London Lords' player. The 1957 lost final was a particularly crushing disappointment for the Lords. Although entering the 2-way final as the underdogs, having lost both of their regular season games to the Kitchener-Waterloo Dutchmen, the Lords stormed the first game 42–6. They also gained an early lead at the return leg, before conceding 48 points in 45 minutes.

== Legacy and later developments ==
In 1974, the same year that the ORFU formally folded, an investment group had reportedly approached the CFL with the intention of establishing an expansion team in London. The CFL was reported to have quoted the group a price of $2,700,000 for an expansion team. It is unknown for what reasons that the expansion bid failed and that the team never began play.

In 2011, the London Lords were inducted into the London Sports Hall of Fame.

In 2013, the name "London Lords" was adopted by the former London Silverbacks, a semi-professional Canadian football team, competing in World Minor League Football. This league ceased to operate shortly afterward in 2015.

== ORFU Season-By-Season ==
Season	W	L	T	PF	PA	Pts	Finish	Playoffs
1956	3	7	0	124	177	6	4th, ORFU	-
1957	8	2	2	320	110	18	1st, ORFU	Lost Final
