= Willie Fleming =

American gridiron football player (born 1939)

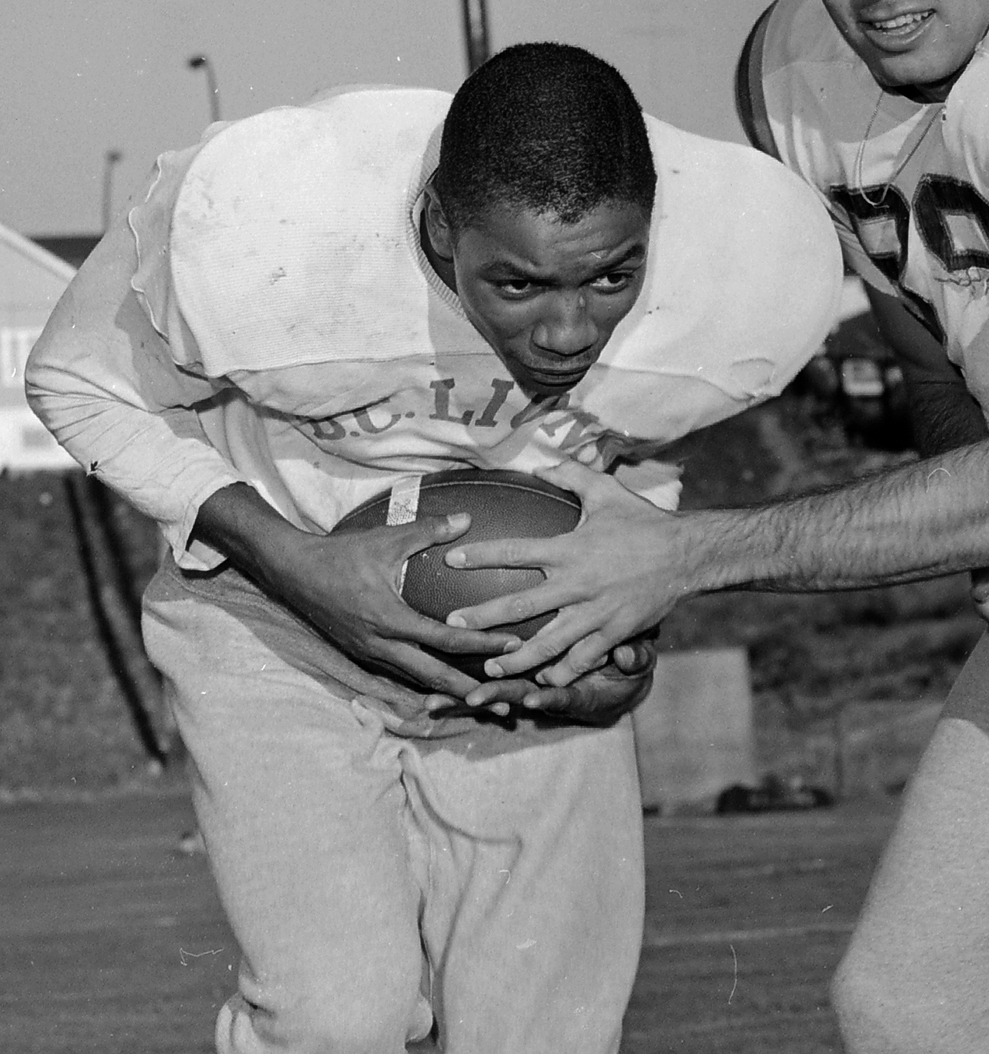
- Fleming with the BC Lions in 1960

Profile
- Position: Running back

Personal information
- Born: February 2, 1939 (age 87); Atlanta, Georgia, U.S.
- Listed height: 5 ft 9 in (1.75 m)
- Listed weight: 183 lb (83 kg)

Career information
- College: Iowa
- NFL draft: 1961: 14th round, 196th overall pick

Career history
- 1959–1966: BC Lions

Awards and highlights
- Grey Cup champion (1964); CFL All-Star (1963); 3× CFL West All-Star (1961, 1962, 1963); National champion (1958); First-team All-Big Ten (1958); BC Lions #15 retired
- Canadian Football Hall of Fame (Class of 1982)

Willie Fleming (born February 2, 1939) is an American former professional football player with the Canadian Football League (CFL)'s BC Lions. Fleming played collegiately as a halfback at the University of Iowa, where he was a member of the Hawkeyes' 1959 Rose Bowl championship team. He is a member of the Canadian Football Hall of Fame, the BC Sports Hall of Fame, and the BC Lions Wall of Fame. Fleming's number 15 jersey is one of eleven numbers retired by the Lions. In 2003, Fleming was voted a member of the BC Lions All-Time Dream Team as part of the club's 50th anniversary celebration. In 2006, Fleming was voted to the Honour Roll of the CFL's Top 50 players of the league's modern era by Canadian sports network TSN.

Fleming earned the nickname "The Wisp" or "Will 'o the Wisp" because of his elusive running style.

== Early life and college ==
Fleming played halfback at Hamtramck High School in Detroit, winning All-City honors in 1956. His Head Coach was Babe Dimancheff.

In 1957, Fleming began his college career at the University of Iowa, where he was eventually named an Associated Press First Team All-Big Ten player in 1958. In 1958, Fleming helped the Hawkeyes to a 6–0–1 Big Ten clinching victory over the University of Minnesota, and led the team in scoring.

In 1959, Fleming and the 7–1–1 Hawkeyes defeated the University of California (and Fleming's future BC Lions teammate, quarterback Joe Kapp) 38–12, in the 1959 Rose Bowl. Fleming scored 2 rushing touchdowns in the game, and finished with 85 yards on 9 attempts.

== Professional career ==
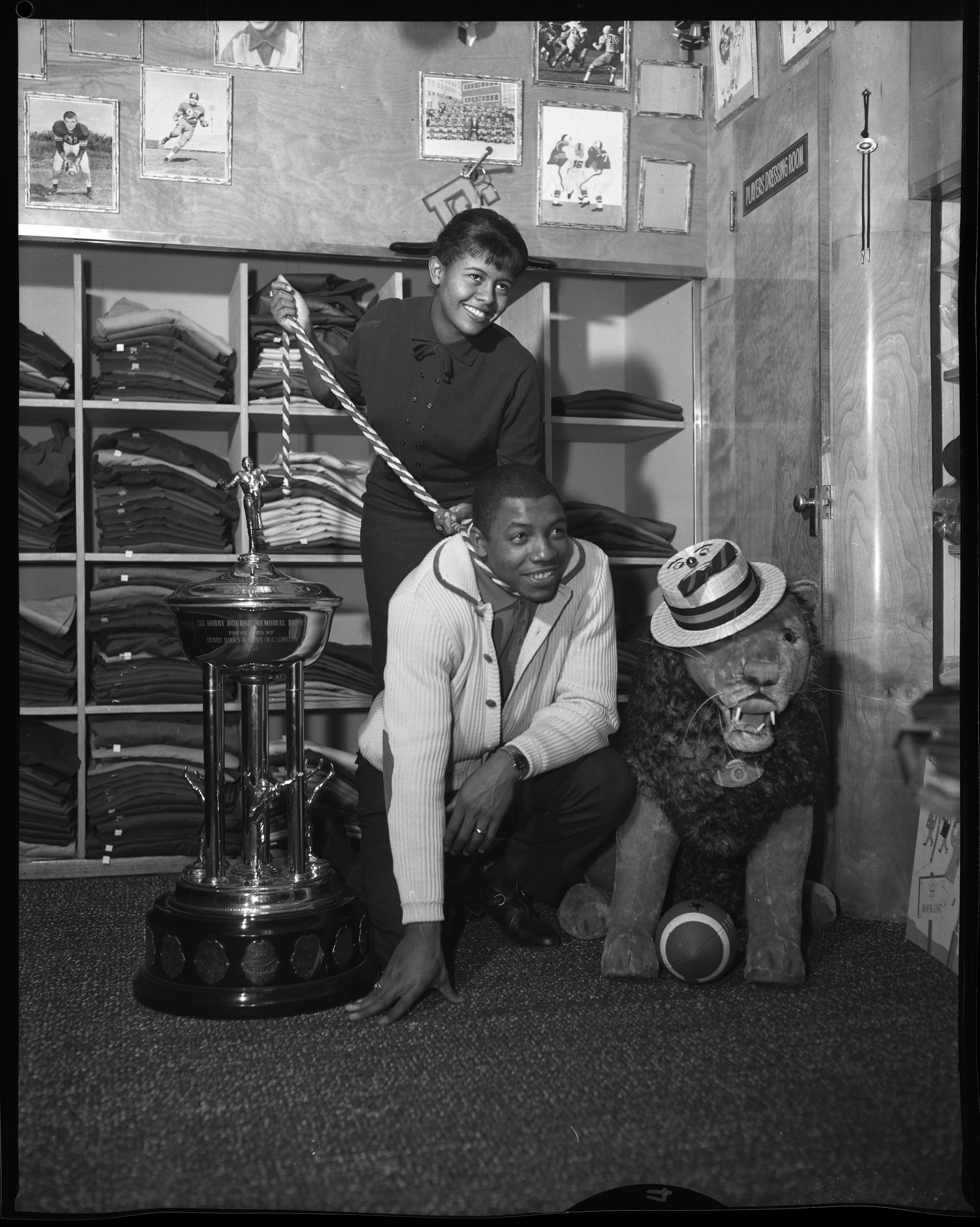
Arlene and Willie Fleming in 1960.

Following the 1959 Rose Bowl, Fleming joined the Canadian Football League BC Lions for the 1959 season. By 1960, he became the first Lion to eclipse 1,000 yards rushing with 1,051 yards on 125 carries for an 8.4 yard average.

In 1963, Fleming and Kapp led the Lions to a 12–4 record and the CFL Western Division championship. The Lions next faced the Hamilton Tiger-Cats in the 1963 CFL Championship Grey Cup. During the 1963 Grey Cup game, Fleming was involved in a widely discussed and controversial play as he was hit by Ti-Cat defensive lineman Angelo Mosca, while Fleming was out of bounds, resulting in Fleming's absence from the remainder of the game (and a trip to the hospital). Despite a disappointing end to the season (the Lions lost to the Tiger-Cats, 21–10), Fleming had his finest season as a professional football player, as he rushed for 1,234 yards on 127 carries for an incredible 9.7 yard average.

The following year, Fleming and the Lions would get their revenge, as the BC Lions again faced the Hamilton Tiger-Cats in the 1964 Grey Cup. The Lions won their first CFL championship 34–24, and Fleming scored a game-breaking touchdown on a 68-yard scoring run over Mosca's position. Earlier in the 1964 season, Fleming scored the longest touchdown run from scrimmage (109 yards) against the Edmonton Eskimos, a CFL record that still stands.

Fleming retired from the CFL and the BC Lions following the 1966 season. Fleming retired as a CFL All-Star in 1963, a three-time CFL Western Division All-Star, and was named the most popular BC Lions Player three times. After sitting out the 1967 season, Fleming attempted a comeback with the Minnesota Vikings in 1968, but was released before the regular season began. Fleming was inducted into the Canadian Football Hall of Fame in 1982. In 2003, Fleming was voted a member of the BC Lions All-Time Dream Team, at the running back position, as part of the club's 50 year anniversary celebration. In November, 2006, Fleming was voted to the Honour Roll of the CFL's top 50 players of the league's modern era by Canadian sports network TSN.

== Career regular season rushing statistics ==
Year	Team	GP	Rush	Yards	Y/R	Lg	TD
1959	BC Lions	16	110	774	7.0	52	3
1960	BC Lions	16	125	1051	8.4	98	10
1961	BC Lions	15	96	468	4.9	64	2
1962	BC Lions	16	139	993	7.1	97	7
1963	BC Lions	16	127	1234	9.7	97	5
1964	BC Lions	16	129	750	5.8	109	6
1965	BC Lions	15	93	595	6.4	30	2
1966	BC Lions	16	49	260	5.3	29	3
	CFL Totals		868	6125	7.1	109	38

== After football ==
Retired from the CFL since 1967, Fleming currently resides in Bedford, Ohio and stays busy working out three times a week, keeping in shape.
