= 1959 Toronto Argonauts season =

CFL team season

- Head coach: Hamp Pool; Steve Owen
- Home stadium: Exhibition Stadium

Results
- Record: 4–10
- Division place: 4th, IRFU
- Playoffs: did not qualify

The 1959 Toronto Argonauts finished in fourth place in the Interprovincial Rugby Football Union with a 4–10 record and failed to make the playoffs.

== Preseason ==
The Argonauts hosted an interleague exhibition game on August 5 against the NFL's Chicago Cardinals in the inaugural game at the new Exhibition Stadium. The game was the first to involve an NFL team played in Toronto. It was also the first NFL-CFL interleague exhibition match held since the establishment of the Canadian Football League in 1958. The Argos lost 55–26.

=== Schedule ===
Game	Date	Opponent	Results		Venue	Attendance
Game	Date	Opponent	Score	Record	Venue	Attendance
A	Wed, Aug 5	vs. Chicago Cardinals (NFL)	L 26–55	0–1	Exhibition Stadium	27,770
B	Wed, Aug 12	vs. Saskatchewan Roughriders	W 53–13	1–1	Exhibition Stadium	8,000

== Regular season ==
=== Standings ===
Interprovincial Rugby Football Union
Team	GP	W	L	T	PF	PA	Pts
Hamilton Tiger-Cats	14	10	4	0	298	162	20
Ottawa Rough Riders	14	8	6	0	275	217	16
Montreal Alouettes	14	6	8	0	193	305	12
Toronto Argonauts	14	4	10	0	192	274	8

=== Schedule ===
Week	Game	Date	Opponent	Results		Venue	Attendance
Week	Game	Date	Opponent	Score	Record	Venue	Attendance
1	1	Tue, Aug 18	at Ottawa Rough Riders	W 21–20	1–0	Landsdowne Park	20,675
1	2	Fri, Aug 21	vs. Hamilton Tiger-Cats	L 7–16	1–1	Exhibition Stadium	27,554
2	3	Fri, Aug 28	at Montreal Alouettes	L 6–24	1–2	Molson Stadium	23,927
3	4	Mon, Sept 7	at Hamilton Tiger-Cats	L 3–37	1–3	Civic Stadium	24,245
4	5	Sun, Sept 13	vs. Ottawa Rough Riders	W 19–6	2–3	Exhibition Stadium	25,849
5	6	Wed, Sept 16	at Ottawa Rough Riders	L 1–28	2–4	Landsdowne Park	13,097
5	7	Sun, Sept 20	vs. Hamilton Tiger-Cats	L 17–34	2–5	Exhibition Stadium	27,883
6	8	Sat, Sept 26	vs. Montreal Alouettes	W 39–9	3–5	Exhibition Stadium	20,035
7	9	Sat, Oct 3	at Montreal Alouettes	W 37–14	4–5	Molson Stadium	22,152
8	10	Sat, Oct 10	vs. Hamilton Tiger-Cats	L 7–13	4–6	Exhibition Stadium	26,223
8	11	Mon, Oct 12	at Hamilton Tiger-Cats	L 7–20	4–7	Civic Stadium	22,068
9	12	Sat, Oct 17	vs. Montreal Alouettes	L 3–4	4–8	Exhibition Stadium	19,941
10	13	Sat, Oct 24	at Ottawa Rough Riders	L 4–18	4–9	Landsdowne Park	14,996
11	14	Sat, Oct 31	vs. Ottawa Rough Riders	L 21–31	4–10	Exhibition Stadium	19,465
