= NFL in Toronto =

The National Football League (NFL) has been playing games in Toronto, Ontario, Canada, since 1959 when an interleague game between the Chicago Cardinals of the NFL and the Toronto Argonauts (often shortened as Argos) of the Canadian Football League (CFL) took place at Exhibition Stadium. Subsequently, a number of neutral site preseason and regular season games between NFL teams have been staged in the city. Toronto is one of nine cities outside the United States—along with London, Mexico City, Frankfurt, Munich, Berlin, São Paulo, Madrid, and Dublin—to have hosted a regular season NFL game. Melbourne, Paris, and Rio de Janeiro are scheduled to host their first regular season NFL games in 2026.

There have long been efforts to establish an NFL franchise in Toronto due to its market size. Toronto is among the largest cities in North America, and the largest in either Canada or the United States that is not home to an NFL team. The city hosts franchises in all of the other major professional sports leagues in the United States and Canada. As of 2020, the league has expressed interest in establishing a team in the city provided certain conditions are met, the most crucial being the construction of a new football-specific stadium.

== Games played in Toronto ==
The first professional U.S. football team to play a home game in Toronto was the Los Angeles Wildcats of the American Football League of 1926, the first major competitor to the National Football League for the dominance of professional football. While the Wildcats nominally represented Los Angeles, travel to the west coast posed a major obstacle at the time so the team was instead a traveling team based in Illinois. They played most of their games in the home stadiums of their opponents, with the exception of the Toronto game. The Wildcats lost the regular season game to the New York Yankees (which would join the NFL the following year) 28–0 in front of 10,000 fans at Maple Leaf Stadium on 8 November 1926. The game was relatively popular; at the time Canadian football still more closely resembled rugby football and would not adopt the forward pass until three years after the game.

In 1955, Eric Cradock, who would later become part owner of the Argos, stated that he was considering bringing two NFL teams to the city to play a game to test the market's interest in a full-time NFL franchise; this was four years after the second of two games, featuring the NFL's New York Giants, had been played in Ottawa against the local Canadian football team, the Ottawa Rough Riders. The NFL played its first game in Toronto in 1959, when the Toronto Argonauts of the Canadian Football League hosted the first of three NFL teams in a three-season span. The first ever appearance of an NFL team in Toronto was in August of that year during the Chicago Cardinals–Toronto Argonauts exhibition game, hosted to celebrate the grand opening of Exhibition Stadium; it broke the record for exhibition attendance in Canada at 27,770. These inter league exhibition games, which had been first tried in Ottawa in 1950 and were later staged in Montreal, were typically played by CFL rules in the first half and NFL rules in the second. The Argos lost all three games. The nearby Hamilton Tiger-Cats also hosted a game against the Bills, then an American Football League team. Buffalo lost the game 38–21, the only time a current or future NFL team would lose to a CFL team. In 1960 the New York Giants and Chicago Bears played an exhibition game at Varsity Stadium in the first game featuring two NFL teams to be played outside the United States.

During the 1982 NFL season the NFL players went on strike. In the absence of regular season NFL games, the National Football League Players Association scheduled a series of All-star games across the continent to raise funds. A game between the AFC East and NFC East was scheduled for Toronto's Varsity Stadium for October 24. However, the game was cancelled following a court ruling that permitted players who participated in the games to be sued by their clubs for violating their contracts.

A Toronto group had plans to bring the Buffalo Bills to Toronto to play an exhibition game at Exhibition Stadium in 1988, with hopes that it would become an annual event. However, following objections from CFL Commissioner Douglas Mitchell the game was vetoed by NFL Commissioner Pete Rozelle. The group would unsuccessfully continue to try to arrange a game for a future season. In 1993 the Cleveland Browns hosted one of their pre-season games in Toronto, which was organized by Molson Brewery, due to a scheduling conflict at Cleveland Stadium with the Cleveland Indians. As early as 1994 the Bills were considering hosting some of their regular season home games in Toronto, with SkyDome officials actively attempting to organize a regular season NFL game at the new stadium. When the NFL reached a five-year partnership agreement with the CFL in 1997, which included a $3 million loan to the Canadian league, the NFL received the CFL's blessing to hold an annual preseason or regular season game in either Toronto or Vancouver for the duration of the agreement. The Bills played in two pre-season American Bowls in Toronto in 1995 and 1997, organized by Paul Godfrey, in an attempt to prove the city's worthiness to host a franchise permanently. The Argos received $300,000 from the organizers to waive their exclusivity on football at the stadium for the game in 1995. In 2000 the NFL announced that SkyDome would host American Bowls in 2001 and 2003, but the games ultimately never took place, with the 2001 game being scrapped due to a lack of high-profile teams willing to participate. A planned game featuring the Chicago Bears in the 2002 season was called off in part due to the poor state of the artificial turf at the SkyDome.

At the 2005 Super Bowl, NFL Commissioner Paul Tagliabue said the league was considering staging an NFL regular season game in Toronto within a few years, with Godfrey and Rogers Communications bidding to host a game at the SkyDome, which had been renamed the Rogers Centre, in partnership with Maple Leaf Sports & Entertainment (MLSE) and Larry Tanenbaum, chairman and minority owner of MLSE. Toronto was one of five cities considered to host a game in 2007, but at the request of the CFL the NFL pushed back their plans for a game in the city by a year so as not to compete with the 95th Grey Cup being hosted in Toronto for the first time since 1992.

=== Bills Toronto Series ===
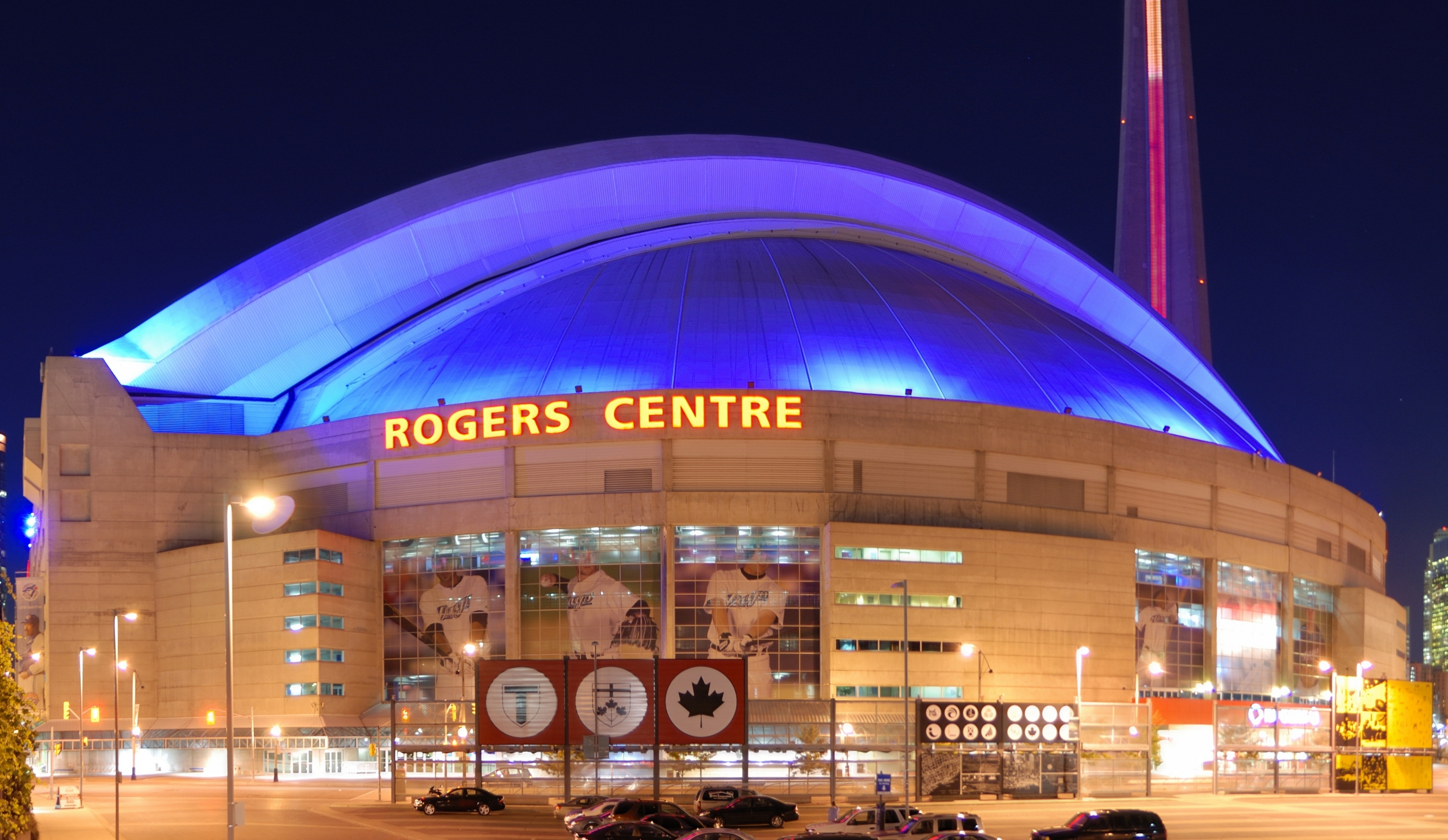
Rogers Centre, home of the Bills Toronto Series from 2008 to 2013.

On October 18, 2007, the Bills announced that they were seeking NFL approval to play a pre-season and at least one regular season home game in Toronto in an attempt to regionalize the franchise and capitalize on the southern Ontario market. Moving games from Ralph Wilson Stadium required the approval of Erie County and the Empire State Development Corporation. For decades, the Bills have had a large fan base in southern Ontario. The team averages 15,000 Canadian fans a game, and has a Canadian sales office and radio affiliate in Toronto: CJCL. The NFL's television rules in Canada have been applied in a similar manner to secondary markets in the U.S., so that nearly all Bills games are televised in Toronto (on CFTO and CITY). Toronto is within a 75-mile (120 km) radius of Ralph Wilson Stadium, and thus it was subject to the league's blackout policy for home games that do not sell out.

On January 30, 2008, it was announced that Rogers Communications and Tanenbaum had reached an agreement with the Bills to host five annual regular-season and three exhibition NFL games over five seasons at Toronto's Rogers Centre, beginning in 2008. Rogers Communications, owner of the Rogers Centre, paid CA$78 million for the games. Unlike the NFL International Series games in London, the Bills Toronto Series games were organized by the Bills and Rogers, and not the NFL. Priority to purchase tickets for Bills in Toronto games was given to season ticket holders of the CFL's Toronto Argonauts and Hamilton Tiger-Cats.

Tickets were originally sold only as a package for all eight games, with prices ranging from CA$55 to CA$295, and VIP tickets from CA$325 to CA$575. The average ticket price of CA$183 was significantly above the highest in the NFL (after converting to U.S. dollars), and nearly four times the Bills' ticket prices, which were the lowest in the league. Buffalo won the first preseason game against the Pittsburgh Steelers, 24–21, but there were reports that organizers had to give away over 10,000 tickets to ensure a sellout crowd, a suggestion denied by Ted Rogers, President and CEO of Rogers Communications. The first regular season game against the division rival Miami Dolphins was played after the completion of the 2008 CFL season. The Bills lost 16–3, eliminating them from playoff contention for the ninth straight year. Reportedly, about half of the crowd was Dolphins fans.

In March 2009 Rogers announced that it was considering renegotiating the agreement to add a second annual regular-season Bills game beginning in 2010, though this never came to fruition. Ticket prices for the 2009 game were lowered by an average of 17%. The game, which the Bills lost 19–13 to the New York Jets, was featured on the NFL Network's Thursday Night Football package. The following year, the Bills lost to the Chicago Bears, 22–19.

During negotiations over a new collective bargaining agreement with the players in 2011, NFL officials considered lengthening the season by 2 games, with the possibility of incorporating additional international play. Rogers again expressed an interest in expanding the series by an additional game per season, particularly if the schedule was lengthened. The Bills organization opposed playing more than one regular season game each year in Toronto. However, the schedule ultimately remained at 16 games. In his "State of the Team" address in 2011, Bills CEO Russ Brandon said that the series had been a major success and had increased the share of ticket sales from Toronto by 44% relative to prior to the series. Later that year the Bills won their first game in Toronto, defeating the Washington Redskins, 23–0.

The pre-season game originally scheduled for the fifth year of the series was moved back to Buffalo, due to conflicts at the Rogers Centre with home games for the Blue Jays and Argonauts, and a Bruce Springsteen concert. In the final regular season game of the original deal, the Bills lost to the Seattle Seahawks 50–17.

On May 22, 2012, the league gave their approval for a five-year extension to the Bills Toronto Series through 2017, should the two sides reach an agreement. The renewal, featuring one regular season game each year plus a pre-season game in 2015, was formally announced on January 29, 2013. Rogers reportedly paid roughly half of the $78 million the original deal cost. In the first game of the second deal, the Bills lost to the Atlanta Falcons 34–31 in overtime.

On March 5, 2014, the Bills and Rogers released a joint statement which announced that they had "postponed for one year the scheduled 2014 regular season game at Rogers Centre" and that they would "use this time to collectively evaluate opportunities and build on the foundation to enhance future games." Keith Pelley, President of Rogers Communication, said that "there's no hiding the fact the series did not get off to a rosy start" and that "it's tough midway through to change that perception, hence the reason why we thought it would be a best to take a year off then re-launch it once we've thought that through." Pelly also raised the possibility that the series would be replaced by an NFL International Series game not featuring the Bills. Brandon described Toronto as a "challenged market" for the team and stated that the series "has not translated into enough wins for us there". However, Brandon also emphasized the financial benefits of the series by saying that it has "taken a game out of the [Buffalo] market that has essentially taken 70,000 seats out of our market, and we've truly only sold out two of our home games". He went on to say "we've manufactured sellouts in the other four or five. We're trying to find ways to obviously keep this team viable and we've done a very good job, and this [Toronto] series has obviously contributed to that". Brandon has also said that the additional game would "stress-test the Buffalo market". Brandon revealed that "Southern Ontario and the Toronto market and the GTA (Greater Toronto Area) are now the top secondary market of the Buffalo Bills". Following the death of team owner Ralph Wilson in March 2014 the Bills were purchased by Kim and Terrence Pegula, who announced their intentions to end the Toronto Series in a November 2014 interview. On December 3, 2014, it was announced that the Bills and Rogers Communications had reached an agreement to cancel the Toronto Series, despite four years being left on the contract.

When a major snow storm hit Buffalo in late November 2014, forcing the Bills to move a home game from Ralph Wilson Stadium, the Rogers Centre was considered as an alternate site. However, a conflicting event and concerns about getting passports for all the players and staff on short notice made this unworkable, and Ford Field in Detroit, Michigan was chosen instead.

After NFL owners voted to expand the NFL International Series to include games in international cities outside the United Kingdom, Mark Waller, executive vice-president international of the NFL, said that though the initial target markets were Mexico and Germany, Canada was also under consideration to host a game and that Toronto was "a major opportunity". League staff visited the city in 2016 to investigate the suitability of the Rogers Centre to play host to future games. Chris Halpin, who replaced Waller, reiterated in 2019 that Canada was being considered for a future International Series game. In 2021 the NFL expanded its season to 17 games per team, with four of the additional regular season games planned to be held in international markets annually. Canada was mentioned as a market that was a focus for hosting these games, along with Europe, Mexico, South America and the United Kingdom. In June 2021 Toronto was also reportedly under consideration to be a temporary home for the Buffalo Bills prior to the completion of construction of a proposed new stadium.

In September 2025, MLSE announced that they had entered into a partnership with the Buffalo Bills of the National Football League to promote the growth of football in Canada and market Bills merchandise at their Real Sports Apparel store. When asked about the possibility of Toronto again hosting future Bills games, team COO Pete Guelli and MLSE president Keith Pelley did not rule it out, but Guelli stated that the Bills' focus in the short term is opening their new stadium, New Highmark Stadium. In September 2026, NFL commissioner Goodell said that in terms of the league hosting more games in Toronto, "the big thing is the stadium".

=== List of games ===
Below is a list of games played in southern Ontario by teams from the NFL, and its predecessor leagues the American Football League of 1926 (AFL 1926) and American Football League (AFL) from which the NFL absorbed teams.

==== CFL interleague games ====
Date	Visitor	Score	Home	Stadium	Attendance
August 5, 1959	Chicago Cardinals	55–26	Toronto Argonauts	Exhibition Stadium	27,770
August 3, 1960	Pittsburgh Steelers	43–16	Toronto Argonauts	Exhibition Stadium	23,570
August 2, 1961	St. Louis Cardinals	36–7	Toronto Argonauts	Exhibition Stadium	24,376
August 8, 1961	Buffalo Bills (AFL)	21–38	Hamilton Tiger-Cats	Civic Stadium	12,000

==== Preseason games ====
Date	Visitor	Score	Home	Stadium	Attendance
August 15, 1960	Chicago Bears	16–7	New York Giants	Varsity Stadium	5,401
August 27, 1988	Tampa Bay Buccaneers	Cancelled	Buffalo Bills	Exhibition Stadium	—
August 14, 1993	New England Patriots	9–12	Cleveland Browns	SkyDome	33,021
August 12, 1995	Dallas Cowboys	7–9	Buffalo Bills	SkyDome	55,799
August 16, 1997	Green Bay Packers	35–3	Buffalo Bills	SkyDome	53,896
August 14, 2008	Pittsburgh Steelers	21–24	Buffalo Bills	Rogers Centre	48,434
August 19, 2010	Indianapolis Colts	21–34	Buffalo Bills	Rogers Centre	39,583

==== Regular season games ====
Date	Visitor	Score	Home	Stadium	Attendance
November 8, 1926	New York Yankees (AFL 1926)	28–0	Los Angeles Wildcats (AFL 1926)	Maple Leaf Stadium	10,000
December 7, 2008	Miami Dolphins	16–3	Buffalo Bills	Rogers Centre	52,134
December 3, 2009	New York Jets	19–13	Buffalo Bills	Rogers Centre	51,567
November 7, 2010	Chicago Bears	22–19	Buffalo Bills	Rogers Centre	50,746
October 30, 2011	Washington Redskins	0–23	Buffalo Bills	Rogers Centre	51,579
December 16, 2012	Seattle Seahawks	50–17	Buffalo Bills	Rogers Centre	40,770
December 1, 2013	Atlanta Falcons	34–31 (OT)	Buffalo Bills	Rogers Centre	38,969

== Toronto NFL franchise ==
While Toronto has been home to American football teams, including the Continental Football League's Toronto Rifles from 1965 to 1967, no NFL team has ever been based in the city. However, there were numerous efforts to bring an NFL club to Toronto from 1975 to 2014. In 1952 it was reported that the Dallas Texans of the NFL might be moved to Toronto. In 1955, Eric Cradock, who would later become part owner of the Argos, stated that he had held discussions with the NFL about establishing a Toronto NFL team. Later that year it was reported that the Argos would join the NFL by 1957, contingent upon a larger stadium being constructed, and that there were several other bidders for a Toronto NFL team. A Toronto group announced in 1960 that they were in negotiations with the league for a Toronto franchise to begin play by 1962. The same year, a separate group brought the New York Giants and Chicago Bears to Toronto to play an exhibition game at Varsity Stadium with the goal of eventually acquiring an expansion franchise for the city. However, prior to the game George Halas, owner of the Bears and chairman of the NFL's expansion committee, said on NFL expansion into Canada "we should not do anything detrimental to [Canada's] game". In 1964 a Toronto group submitted a bid for an expansion franchise to begin play in 1967, with plans to construct a new stadium. The following year, NFL commissioner Pete Rozelle listed the city as one of 12 potential expansion markets, but stated that "we would not want to do anything detrimental to the CFL." In 1969, a Toronto group approached the NFL about bringing a team to the city. Later that year, Rozelle said that the league could expand "outside the continental United States", including possibly to Canadian cities.

During John W. H. Bassett's ownership of the Argonauts from 1957 to 1974, he entertained various machinations for bringing American football to Toronto, including moving the Argos to the NFL or bringing an NFL expansion team to the city. At the time Montreal was also pursuing an NFL team and Bassett was concerned that if they were successful it could lead to the demise of the Montreal Alouettes and ultimately the CFL. He viewed his plans to have Toronto join the NFL as a precaution against such a scenario. His son John F. Bassett's attempt to launch the Toronto Northmen in the World Football League in 1974 led to the Canadian government proposing the Canadian Football Act, a bill that was never approved but would have banned US football leagues from playing in Canada to protect the CFL from competition. The bill forced Bassett to move the club to Memphis where they became the Memphis Southmen.

As far back as the early 1970s, Larry Tanenbaum, now the chairman and minority owner of MLSE, and future Chairman of the Municipality of Metropolitan Toronto Paul Godfrey had plans for the construction of a stadium to bring an NFL team to Toronto. In 1980, an NFL spokesperson said that "we would not consider expanding into Canada unless the federal government extends an invitation". Rozelle said in 1987 that "Toronto and Montreal are both great cities, capable of supporting NFL franchises, but ... we have an obligation to those cities in the United States". After several US lawmakers suggested that they would pressure the NFL to expand within the United States rather than to Canada, Don Weiss, executive director of the NFL, said in 1987 that "Congressional pressure will obviously be brought to bear on us" and that "their reaction will affect our decision." In 1990, new commissioner Paul Tagliabue said that "it is obviously realistic in this decade" for an NFL team to be based in Canada. However, the following year he said he would continue Rozelle's policy of not expanding into Canada. In 1992, with the NFL considering expansion, Tagliabue said "it's a decision we made to limit expansion applications to U.S. cities, because it's our belief that a number of U.S. cities are qualified, and they should be serviced first". He went on to say "we're simply making a business judgment" and it "has nothing to do with any understanding with the Canadian Football League." However, by 1995 Tagliabue said of Toronto "we're very interested in this market". The same year, Roger Goodell, the NFL's vice-president and future commissioner, said Toronto was "unquestionably one of the cities under consideration for future expansion."

When the plans for the construction of SkyDome were being developed an NFL team was considered as a possible tenant for the new stadium. To retain flexibility for this possibility, the stadium operators resisted giving the Argos football exclusivity in their lease at the stadium. In 1989, shortly after an announcement that a Montreal-based group was seeking an NFL team for their city, a group led by Godfrey and Carling O'Keefe Breweries announced that they had been pursuing an NFL team for two years to play at the soon to be opened SkyDome, as a contingency in case the CFL or the Argos folded. O'Keefe had previously owned the Argos and retained the right to put an NFL team in the SkyDome if the Argos ceased to exist. In 1994, Labatt Brewing Company, then owner of the Blue Jays and Argonauts, considered purchasing the Tampa Bay Buccaneers and relocating them to SkyDome following the death of club owner Hugh Culverhouse, with Richard Peddie, who was President of Labatt's sports division, saying that he hoped to acquire a team for the city. Toronto was one of five finalist cities who had groups bidding to purchase the franchise. Toronto interests also pursued the Los Angeles Rams before they relocated to St. Louis in 1995. Toronto was one of several cities that Art Modell considered relocating the Cleveland Browns to in 1995 prior to choosing Baltimore. By this time, the Godfrey led group was hoping for a team by the 1998 season, with Tagliabue saying the city was on the short list of expansion candidates. In 1997 the Minnesota Vikings went up for sale and a Toronto group inquired about purchasing the team.

The relocation of the Los Angeles Rams and Los Angeles Raiders to St. Louis and Oakland, respectively, in 1995 left the second largest market in the United States without a team. This was long considered an obstacle to Toronto acquiring an NFL team, as the league had made it a priority to return a team to Los Angeles (LA), with NFL official Eric Grubman calling it "one of our top goals".

The controversy surrounding the Browns' relocation to Baltimore eventually persuaded the NFL to agree to a settlement stipulating a return to Cleveland as soon as possible. When the NFL decided to return there via the addition of a 31st team in 1998, it confirmed an additional expansion team would be added as soon as possible so as to ensure an even number of teams. Toronto was one of three finalists for the NFL's 32nd franchise (along with Houston and Los Angeles) considered. At the time, Tagliabue said that "the CFL and NFL could fit together in Canada." By this time there were questions whether SkyDome was a viable long-term NFL venue, with Godfrey developing plans for a new stadium near Downsview Park. Then Toronto mayor Mel Lastman ruled out funding from the city, saying "no money for professional sports". It was speculated that if Toronto's bid to host the 2008 Summer Olympics was successful, the stadium constructed for the games could be repurposed for an NFL club. When it became clear that Toronto was not likely to get the expansion team, Godfrey suggested that "I don't think they'll leave L.A. or Houston out for, say, 10 years. I will, though, grab hold of the coattails of whoever is left out this time around and hopefully go in with them." It was suggested that if the league expanded to LA (which ultimate lost out to Houston) it might need to grant a second expansion team to balance the league with an even number of teams, leaving the door open for Toronto. However, in 2005 Tagliabue said that "if there is expansion, I would think it would leave us with an odd number of teams for some period of time." He went on to say that "I don't see expansion in Canada as being related to what we might do in Los Angeles."

Godfrey was named president and CEO of the Toronto Blue Jays when the team was purchased by Rogers Communications in 2000. At the time, Godfrey stated that "part of my responsibilities are to chase an NFL team and other sports options". Ted Rogers, who had held discussion with Godfrey with regards to owning an NFL team as far back as 1994, said that "We think the city deserves an NFL team. We want to be part of that." Corporate ownership is forbidden under the NFL's ownership policy, so Rogers Communications would not be able to buy a team like they did with the Blue Jays. Rather, Ted Rogers would have had to have purchased it as an individual. When Rogers acquired the New England Sea Wolves of the Arena Football League (AFL) and relocated them to Toronto a month later, it was suggested that the move would help the drive for an NFL team as the NFL had a close relationship with the AFL. Numerous AFL clubs were owned by NFL teams, and the NFL held an option to purchase 49.9% of the AFL, though it never executed it.

By this time Godfrey had switched his focus from an expansion team to the relocation of an existing team, saying "I used to think an expansion franchise was the way to go but I'm quite certain now that our best chance would be to acquire an existing franchise. There are four or five franchises in the NFL that could move, and I see no reason why Toronto can't get one of them in the not-too-distant future." Late that year it was reported that Rogers had targeted the Arizona Cardinals to relocate to Toronto, with plans for the SkyDome to undergo a significant renovation to make it acceptable for the NFL, including removing the attached hotel so it could be replaced with extra seats. In 2001 Godfrey said that "the NFL requires that the team control the luxury box revenues" of its stadium As the SkyDome was owned by Sportsco at the time, this was an impediment to securing a team. However, following the purchase of the stadium by Rogers in 2004, this issue was resolved.

It was reported in 2001 that the New Orleans Saints were considering Toronto as a potential city to relocate to. Godfrey has stated that in 2005 the NFL gave him and Tanenbaum permission to discuss the sale of the New Orleans Saints with team owner Tom Benson. It was reported that Benson rejected an offer of $1 billion from a group from Canada intending to relocate it to Canada. However, following Hurricane Katrina, which ravaged New Orleans and severely damaged the Louisiana Superdome, Godfrey stated that "the Saints became a symbol for that community. Whatever deal there might have been disappeared." The Saints and Louisiana struck a deal to repair and renovate the Superdome, securing the Saints ties to New Orleans.

In 2005, then NFL commissioner Tagliabue stated that "it could be very likely that the next franchises in the NFL, beyond (the current) 32, are outside the U.S. Toronto would certainly be a candidate", though a year later he said that "I don't see any expansion on the horizon". In 2006, Tanenbaum said that he and Ted Rogers were "highly interested" in bringing an NFL franchise to Toronto and that he was going to "pursue it more rigorously" as soon as the NFL gave him the word. Daryl Katz, future owner of the Edmonton Oilers, was reportedly approached by the two about joining their group. Later that year, new commissioner Roger Goodell said that international expansion was a "possibility" and that "the closer to the border, probably the more likely from a geographic standpoint." Toronto is located across Lake Ontario from the US. In 2007, Mark Waller, who was in charge of the NFL's international operations, was quoted as saying "ten years from now, I hope we will have a team ... in Toronto, playing within the NFL." The same year it was reported that the owners of the Argos, David Cynamon and Howard Sokolowski, fearing the NFL was preparing to move a team to Toronto, had developed plans to acquire an NFL team themselves and relocate it to Toronto in partnership with other CFL owners to ensure that it was done in a manner to protect the Canadian league. Later that year Rogers Communication would lease the Bills from Ralph Wilson for the Toronto Series. Rogers wouldn't comment on whether the step was a prelude to moving the franchise permanently to Toronto, saying "We didn't say we weren't interested, and we didn't say that we were." Wilson would not commit to keeping the team in Buffalo, saying "I can't speculate what's going to happen in the future", and adding "But don't worry. Don't worry right now. Does that answer your questions?"

In 2008, Maple Leaf Sports & Entertainment (MLSE), which owns the Maple Leafs, Raptors and Toronto FC, considered bringing an NFL team to Toronto and building them a new stadium, but abandoned the idea when they concluded that the project would not generate sufficient financial return to justify the significant cost of the project. In March 2010 it was reported that a Toronto group was one of three parties attempting to buy the St. Louis Rams (the others being Shahid Khan and a Dave Checketts–Rush Limbaugh partnership), though the team was ultimately sold to Stan Kroenke. In 2011, Toronto Mayor Rob Ford stated that he supported an NFL team in Toronto, but ruled out public financing for a new stadium. He and his brother Doug, a member of the Toronto City Council, planned on presenting a proposal to league owners regarding the relocation of either the Jaguars or the Saints to Toronto, with the intention of building a new stadium. In 2012 Goodell said, on expansion to LA, that the league "doesn't want to move any of our teams" or "to go to 33".

In July 2013, Tim Leiweke, the new President of MLSE stated of the organization's involvement in bringing an NFL team to Toronto, "it is a safe bet to say we’ll have some role there, to be determined, but that's on our radar screen", and that "we'd go out of our way to make it work here." NFL rules prohibit corporations, such as MLSE, from having an ownership stake in a team. Leiweke later stated that MLSE has "more expertise on how to build (stadiums) than anyone ... MLSE can play a role. We're not the lead here. Our job is to augment whatever group may come together." It has been reported that MLSE is interested in building and managing the proposed NFL stadium, which it has already begun to design. The state of the Argonauts of the CFL has been linked to Toronto's ability to attract an NFL team. Former President of MLSE Richard Peddie has said "everything I'm hearing is that that the NFL is telling them that if you want an NFL team, you better make sure the Argos are okay." Leiweke has said that "there's no way the NFL comes here without the CFL being unbelievably successful first". In 2015 two of the three ownership partners of MLSE (Bell Canada and Tanenbaum's Kilmer Group) acquired ownership of the Argos, and moved the team to the newly renovated BMO Field, which is operated by MLSE, for the 2016 season. Leiweke predicted that this "will help turn [the Argos] around". As a result, it was expected to enhance Toronto's ability to attract an NFL franchise to the city. MLSE agreed to purchase the Argos in December 2017, and the sale received CFL approval in January 2018.

At the NFL's annual meeting in March 2015, Clark Hunt, owner of the Kansas City Chiefs, said Toronto could "certainly support an NFL team", while Houston Texans owner Bob McNair, who sits on the NFL's finance committee, said "I know everybody is interested in" the market. However, several owners reiterated that the league was not planning on expanding in the near future.

=== Bid for the Buffalo Bills ===
As early as 2006, it had been reported that Toronto interests, led by Godfrey and Tanenbaum, were considering purchasing the Bills if they went on the market. In 2013 it was reported that Edward Rogers III, son of Ted Rogers, and a consortium of Tanenbaum and musician Jon Bon Jovi, who previously owned the Arena Football League's Philadelphia Soul, were both considering bidding on the franchise in hopes of moving it to Toronto. It was also reported that Rogers conducted a feasibility study in early 2013 on the construction of an NFL stadium in Toronto.

The Bills were frequently mentioned as a team that could move to Toronto due in part to Buffalo's proximity to the city. Niagara Falls, New York, located between the two cities, was also considered as a compromise location. The Bills play in one of the league's smallest markets, and their games are often blacked out due to not being sold out, even with only seven home games to sell during the Bills in Toronto series. The difficulties selling tickets, particularly late in the season when the weather is much poorer, was part of the reason why capacity of the team's home, Ralph Wilson Stadium, was decreased by 7,000 during its 1998 renovation. Western New York's economic difficulties have forced the Bills to keep their average ticket prices among the lowest in the NFL, and the team did not opt into the loosening of blackout restrictions in 2012.

In March 2013 the team renewed its lease of Ralph Wilson Stadium through the 2022 season. In conjunction with this, an agreement was reached for a $130 million upgrade to the stadium (which was 40 years old at the time), of which $95 million came from the county and state. The lease provided for a one-time $28.4 million option to buy out the final three years effective 30 July 2020. Outside of that window there was no opt-out, and a $400 million liquidated damages penalty was specified in case the team were able to break the lease in court. The lease stipulated that the team will not "sell, assign or otherwise transfer the team to any person who, to the Bills' knowledge, has an intention to relocate, transfer or otherwise move the team during the Non-Relocation Term" without government consent. However, the lease allowed for an annual regular season game and a biennial pre-season game to be played in Toronto. The stadium was deemed unlikely to be satisfactory for the Bills beyond the lease term, with NFL Commissioner Roger Goodell describing the renovations as a "short-term solution". A committee was formed by the Bills and various levels of government to study the possibility of a "substantial renovation" of the existing stadium or the construction of a replacement, though there were doubts that the Buffalo region can afford the more than $800 million cost of a new stadium.

Following owner Ralph Wilson's death on March 25, 2014 the club was put into a trust and confirmed that it would be sold. Wilson had never expressed any desire for his family to inherit the team, and it was widely presumed that his heirs would sell the team to the highest bidder to pay the significant inheritance tax. The franchise was thought to be worth more in a large market than in Buffalo, with one expert putting its value in Buffalo at $950 million-$1 billion versus $1.5 billion in Toronto.

In July 2014 it was reported that Bon Jovi, Tanenbaum and the Rogers family had joined forces as equal partners to bid on the Bills, with Bon Jovi the proposed controlling owner. Though Tanenbaum and Rogers have significant wealth, it was suggested that the Toronto group's bid was limited by Bon Jovi's resources and his desire to be the controlling partner; NFL regulations require the controlling partner to have a 30% equity stake. Following protests by Buffalo area fans against the Toronto group, including radio stations banning Bon Jovi's music, Bon Jovi wrote a public letter to Bills fans saying that the group's objective was to "make the Bills successful in Buffalo" and committing to work with the government "to identify the best possible site in the Buffalo area for a new stadium". However, it noticeably did not explicitly promise to keep the team in Buffalo. The group planned to meet with developers in the Buffalo region to discuss the construction of a new stadium. There was widespread skepticism about the group's intentions to keep the team in Buffalo, with New York Senator Chuck Schumer stating that the lack of a commitment to do so reinforced his belief that they might move the team. A sports franchise relocation expert quoted as saying that if they did intend to move the club, "I would suggest never saying that publicly" due to the legal implications of selling the team to a group planning on relocating it. The group met with former Bills quarterback Jim Kelly, who had long advocated for the team remaining in Buffalo, about joining their ownership group in a move seen as an attempt to boost their public support, but Kelly declined due to concerns about their commitment to Buffalo.

The Toronto group was one of three that was reported to have submitted a final bid for the franchise. Other Canadians who explored purchasing the team included John Bitove, who co-founded the Toronto Raptors, and the family of Francesco Aquilini, who owns the Vancouver Canucks, though it is unknown if they intended to move the team. It was reported that the trust was desirous of a quick and clean sale, which was no guarantee with the Toronto group due to the possibility under the non-relocation agreement of a lawsuit from the county or state blocking the sale if they suspected the team would be moved, as well as potential difficulty in securing approval from the NFL due to the likelihood of negative fan reaction for several years until the franchise transfer could take place. Despite requests from the bank conducting the sale for a clear statement from the Toronto group that they would not move the team, only vague promises to work with local government to build a new stadium in Buffalo were provided. Goodell and several NFL owners expressed their desire for the team to remain in Buffalo, though Jerry Jones, owner of the Dallas Cowboys, endorsed Bon Jovi as an owner, saying that "there hasn't been anybody more qualified to be involved in sports ownership".

On 9 September 2014 it was announced that the franchise had been sold to Kim and Terrence Pegula, who committed to keeping them in Buffalo, for the reported price of $1.4 billion. The Toronto group's bid of $1.05 billion was the second highest reported.

Several years later, it became known that some of the opposition to the Bon Jovi-Rogers-Tanenbaum bid was the result of an astroturfing smear campaign created by rival bidder Donald Trump, later the 45th and 47th president of the United States, hoping to drum up support for his own stalking-horse bid. Trump turned the campaign over to a political operative, Michael Caputo, after placing his bid, since a non-disclosure agreement he signed would have prohibited him from staying involved in that campaign. The organization Trump and Caputo backed remains in existence, now operating as a charity.

In December 2024, Pegula sold a minority stake in the Bills franchise to a number of partners, including retired professional athletes Jozy Altidore, Vince Carter and Tracy McGrady who played for Toronto based teams. Pegula explained the sale by stating that "the three pro athletes are all icons in Toronto. That’s our market. We’re going to grow into that market.

=== Developments 2015–present ===
In late 2015, the St. Louis Rams, San Diego Chargers and Oakland Raiders submitted applications to relocate to Los Angeles, though it was unlikely that the league would approve all three teams moving to the city. It was reported that the Rams would have considered moving to Toronto if their Los Angeles proposal had been rejected. The Chargers and Raiders put forward a joint proposal to build a new stadium, but the league chose the rival bid from the Rams. The Chargers were then given a one-year option to join the Rams in the new SoFi Stadium, and if they chose not to exercise this right the Raiders would be given the same option. Both teams weighed their relocation options, with Toronto one of the cities suggested as a possibility. The return of the NFL to LA made Toronto the largest market in the United States or Canada without an NFL team. In January 2017, the Chargers announced that they had exercised their option to leave San Diego and move to Los Angeles with the Rams. Raiders management met with officials in San Antonio, which has an NFL-caliber stadium in the Alamodome, about possibly moving the team there. In March 2017, the Raiders' request to relocate to Las Vegas was approved by the league, and the team moved there before the 2020 season.

In February 2025 Carolyn Parrish, the Mayor of Mississauga (which borders Toronto), stated that she has been approached by Tanenbaum and Godfrey about potentially constructing a new stadium in the city to host a Toronto based NFL team, and that she was "trying to find land".

=== Potential candidates for relocation ===
The most likely opportunity for Toronto to get an NFL team in the near future would be through relocation. The support of 24 of 32 NFL teams is required for the approval of the sale and relocation of a team. Likewise, any relocation would have to be approved by the same amount, though Al Davis moved the Oakland Raiders to Los Angeles in 1982 against the league's wishes. A relocation fee, which was reportedly $645 million for the Rams and Chargers to move back to LA and $378 million for the Raiders relocation to Las Vegas, could be charged by the NFL, though this could be offset by an increase in franchise value in a larger market like Toronto.

Teams that have been speculated as potential relocation candidates are the Tampa Bay Buccaneers, whose lease runs until 2028, and the Kansas City Chiefs, whose lease expires in 2031 and for which a ballot measure on funding for stadium upgrades was rejected by voters.

=== Potential challenges ===
Bringing an NFL team to Toronto would be exorbitantly expensive, with teams worth around $1 billion United States dollars in 2006 and rising rapidly since then. The variable exchange rate of the US dollar with the Canadian dollar could make the purchase price larger for a Canadian group. Additionally, an NFL team in Toronto would have to pay its players in US dollars while collecting a significant fraction of its revenues in Canadian dollars, the same anomaly that other Canadian teams face. The Montreal Expos, Vancouver Grizzlies, original Winnipeg Jets and Quebec Nordiques all left the country between 1995 and 2004 when the value of the Canadian dollar was low. Finally, the NFL has various restrictions on ownership, such as prohibiting corporate ownership and requiring a controlling owner with at least a 30% stake in the team, limiting the pool of potential ownership groups.

Another major issue is the stadium. Although Godfrey believed that Rogers Centre could host an NFL franchise, that stadium is unlikely to be viable long-term. Rogers Centre only has a capacity of 54,088 when configured for CFL games, which is larger than the NFL's 50,000-seat minimum, but would be the smallest capacity regular-season stadium in the league, the current smallest being Chicago's Soldier Field with 61,500 seats. While extra seats could be added due to the shorter NFL field (an NFL exhibition at the SkyDome in 1995 was attended by almost 55,800 fans) and the high walls at the ends of each end zone in CFL configuration, a large-scale renovation would be required to lower the playing surface. As a result, a new stadium, which would cost roughly $1 billion, would likely need to be built. Texans owner Bob McNair has said the city "wouldn't have to go out and build a stadium, and then try to get a team. But you'd have to be assured that the opportunity exists" for a new stadium to be constructed for a franchise to be approved for the city. Former mayors David Miller and Rob Ford both stated that funding for a new stadium would not come from the City of Toronto. It has been suggested that personal seat licenses could be sold to fund a new stadium. Godfrey said in 2006 that "if you had a 60,000-seat stadium and sold (personal seat licenses) for an average of $10,000, you'd raise $600 million ... you can build a hell of a stadium for that kind of money."

A team based in Toronto could face resistance from the Bills, since a significant portion of their fans come from southern Ontario. Toronto falls within the NFL's definition of the Bills' Home Marketing Areas (75 miles). In 1991 Wilson said "a Toronto club wouldn't hurt us." He went on to say "as far as I know, Toronto isn't in Buffalo's territory" and that "I wouldn't veto expansion to Toronto, anyway, even if I could." However, in 1995 Wilson was quoted as saying "Some day, I'm sure Toronto will have a team. It would be a great franchise up here ... but Toronto is Bills territory." When asked whether he expected financial compensation if an NFL team was established in Toronto, he replied "yes I do. A team in Toronto would definitely have an effect on our team". However, according to Godfrey, then-NFL commissioner Tagliabue's position was that "there are no such things as territorial rights in the NFL." When the NFL was reviewing Pegula's proposed purchase of the Bills in 2014, the NFL asked him what his view would be on an NFL team in Toronto. In late 2014 he said that he told the league Toronto is "a big enough market" for an NFL franchise and he "would support it if Toronto had a franchise."

Any NFL team that entered the Toronto market would have to deal with the Canadian Football League (CFL)'s Toronto Argonauts, as well as the Hamilton Tiger-Cats, who play in nearby Hamilton, Ontario, both of which—as well as the CFL—have objected to an NFL team in Canada. The Tiger-Cats supported the Bills Toronto Series on the premise that it would keep other suitors for the Toronto market at bay. The NFL has been reluctant to hurt the CFL. Godfrey claimed that "the city is big enough ... they both could co-exist in the city." The World Football League (WFL) intended to place a franchise in Toronto known as the Toronto Northmen, but after the Canadian Parliament began debating the Canadian Football Act, which would have banned foreign football leagues from playing in Canada in an attempt to protect the CFL, the WFL moved the team to Memphis, Tennessee. Similar bills have been introduced to Parliament since the Bills Toronto Series was announced. It has been suggested that one of the reasons the NFL would not want to put a franchise in Canada and risk putting the CFL out of business is that the CFL offers antitrust protection as a competing league. However, Commissioner Rozelle said in 1987 that "I can't see where a league operating in Canada could possibly help us in any anti-trust trials."

Since much of the NFL's revenue comes from television rights fees, there could be resistance from the networks to moving a team from the US to Canada, where the hometown fans would not increase US television viewership. When Bassett was considering bringing a team to the city in the 1970s he suggested a solution to this problem: "I say to the NFL teams, don't cut me in on your American TV revenues. Keep your millions to yourself. I say to them, just give me the TV rights for Canada." A report prepared for the Godfrey-O'Keefe group attempting to bring an NFL team to Toronto said that the then chief counsel of the NFL, and future NFL Commissioner, Tagliabue had suggested that "any of the communities within the U.S. where the NFL might respond, will not significantly increase TV viewership" but that "a Canadian team would offer significant over-the-air and cable opportunities for new viewers, this would be particularly attractive to the NFL." In 1987, Rozelle was asked "Do you think you'd be jeopardizing the value of your network TV package, by having one or more Canadian teams?" to which he responded "I wouldn't think so."

The failure of the Bills Toronto Series and the Bon Jovi-MLSE bid for the Buffalo Bills has also been speculated as potentially casting a negative light on Toronto as a future home to an NFL franchise. Counter to this claim is the consideration that a Toronto-based NFL team would logically garner much more support, as while the Buffalo Bills are popular with a plurality of Torontonian football fans, the majority of the city's football fans do not cheer for the Bills. Additionally, the Argonauts lag behind the rest of the CFL teams in attendance, which has cast doubt on the popularity of the sport itself within Toronto. This has been disputed however, as low Toronto football attendance can possibly be paradoxically explained by the dominance of the NFL in the region, as only approximately one fifth of self-described Ontarian football fans exclusively watch the CFL, while as much as half exclusively watch the NFL.

== See also ==
- Toronto sports
- Comparison of Canadian and American football
- Canadian Football League in the United States
- International Bowl
