= China Bowl (NFL) =

Cancelled American football exhibition game

Promotional logo for the proposed game.

The China Bowl (Chinese: 中国碗) was the name of a proposed National Football League (NFL) preseason exhibition game that had been scheduled to take place in August 2007, but later postponed to 2009 and ultimately canceled, between the New England Patriots and the Seattle Seahawks at the National Stadium in Beijing.

The originally scheduled China Bowl was to be played at Workers' Stadium in Beijing, China, on August 8, 2007. The game was to kick off the one-year countdown before the 2008 Summer Olympics in Beijing, and was to take place right before the 2007 FIFA Women's World Cup (also being held in China), and would have been the first NFL-sanctioned game to take place in China, as well as the first NFL preseason game played outside the United States since the league abandoned the American Bowl series in 2005 (game 1 of the Bills Toronto Series held that honor).

On April 2, 2007, the NFL announced the rescheduling of the preseason game in Beijing to August 2009, so that more focus could be placed on the start of the International Series, the first regular season game to take place outside of North America, which took place at Wembley Stadium, London that October. Both teams expressed interest in still playing the game, and the Patriots, having operations in China at the time, would have been an opponent either way.

As a result of the 2008 recession, the Patriots shut down their base of operations in China, and the game was never played. The Patriots were instead assigned to the next game in the International Series, against the Tampa Bay Buccaneers, which was played at Wembley on October 25, 2009. The Patriots won 35–7.

== Attempted 2020 revival ==
In March 2019, the NFL reportedly discussed at owners' meetings whether a preseason game in China would be played during the 2020 season. The San Francisco 49ers and Los Angeles Rams were among the teams interested as their West Coast locations made for cheaper travel. Among the concerns raised at the meeting were a suitable venue and air quality. Scheduling issues (most NFL games are played in the middle of the night in China) and a corresponding lack of fan base in the country are other problems that have previously been mentioned that could prevent the league from playing there.

== See also ==
- List of National Football League games played outside the United States
