= Chicago Cardinals–Toronto Argonauts exhibition game =

1959 football match in Ontario, Canada

1959 Chicago Cardinals–Toronto Argonauts exhibition game
- Event: NFL–CFL exhibition series
Chicago Cardinals	Toronto Argonauts
55	26
- Date: August 5, 1959
- Venue: Exhibition Stadium, Toronto, Ontario
- Attendance: 27,770

The Chicago Cardinals–Toronto Argonauts exhibition game of August 5, 1959, was the inaugural game of Toronto's Exhibition Stadium and the first game a National Football League team played in the city. It was also the first NFL–CFL exhibition match held since the establishment of the Canadian Football League in 1958, and marked the beginning of a three-year, four game exhibition series between the leagues.

The game was played with a mixture of Canadian and American rules. The field featured the larger Canadian dimensions but there were only eleven rather than twelve men a side, as in the NFL; fewer men on a larger surface helped ensure a high scoring game. NFL-style was adopted for down field blocking but it was CFL rules on kicks and returns and the American fair catch rule did not apply.

The Cardinals were lopsided victors in the game, 55–26. The Argonauts did surprise by opening up an early 13–1 lead on the strength of a 70-yard interception return by Bob Dehlinger, but the Cardinal's superior weight and blocking won the day. Eight different Cardinals scored touchdowns and four quarterbacks saw action. Cardinals' coach Frank "Pop" Ivy was intimately familiar with the Canadian game, having coached the Edmonton Eskimos, which gave an advantage to the American squad. Reported to outweigh the Argonauts by an average of twenty pounds, and with specialists at each position, the Cardinals left their Canadian rivals wounded. Four Argos were injured in the contest, including star centre Norm Stoneburgh and Don Caraway, an anchor on the defensive line.

== Reception and aftermath ==
The game generated enormous interest in the city of Toronto. A total of 27,770 attended, smashing the record for a crowd at an exhibition game in Canada. Before the game few in Toronto had given the Argonauts much of a chance, while post-game reports dwelled on the injuries suffered and the massive traffic snarls the game had created. Given the success at the gate, the Argonauts arranged further games in 1960 and 1961; both were lopsided losses and there were suggestions the team was putting money ahead of the health of its players.

Both the Cardinals and Argonauts went on to have dismal seasons going 2–10 and 4–10, respectively By 1960 the Cardinals had moved to St. Louis.

== See also ==
- List of National Football League games played outside the United States
- List of neutral site Canadian Football League games
