= Bills Toronto Series =

Series of preseason and regular season NFL games

Bills Toronto Series Logo

The Bills Toronto Series were a series of National Football League (NFL) games featuring the Buffalo Bills played at Rogers Centre in Toronto, Ontario, Canada. The original series began in the 2008 season and ran through 2012. The Bills were originally scheduled to play eight (later reduced to seven) home games over five seasons as part of the agreement, which included one regular-season game each of the five years and one pre-season game on the first, third and (originally) fifth year of the series. This included the first regular-season NFL game played in Canada, which the Bills lost to the Miami Dolphins. The agreement was renewed for five additional years, with an annual regular season game and one preseason game, on January 29, 2013, but following the 2013 contest it was announced that the 2014 game had been postponed for a year. On December 3, 2014, it was announced that a deal had been reached to terminate the remainder of the contract, ending the Bills' experiment in Toronto.

The series was conceived by a group that included Bills founder Ralph Wilson, Ted Rogers of Rogers Communications and Larry Tanenbaum of Maple Leaf Sports & Entertainment.

== Background ==
Although NFL exhibition games have been played in Canada since 1950 (and even before that, the American Football League of 1926 played a regular-season game in Toronto), it was not until the Bills Toronto Series that a regular-season NFL game was played north of the border, on December 7, 2008. Regular season NFL games have been played outside the United States since 2005, with Fútbol Americano (a one-off regular season game in Mexico City) and the 2007 debut of the NFL International Series, which has promoted regular-season games in London. Both of those events were separate from the Toronto Series, in that the Toronto Series was orchestrated by an individual team while the other regular season games were orchestrated by the league.

Toronto is about 60 miles (97 km) by air from Buffalo and 86 miles (138 km) by car via the Queen Elizabeth Way. Much of southern Ontario is within the Bills' marketing territory as defined by the NFL. About 10,000 to 15,000 attendees (15-20% of the total) of Bills' home games at Ralph Wilson Stadium come from southern Ontario. However, a 2012 poll by Sun Media found that the Pittsburgh Steelers and New England Patriots (a divisional rival of the Bills) were more popular than the Bills in Toronto.

Apart from the NHL (which is the only major sports league with teams in both Buffalo and Toronto), teams from the two cities often host games in the other. The Toronto Argonauts of the Canadian Football League played a preseason game at Buffalo's Civic Stadium in 1951. A similar arrangement saw the Buffalo Braves play a total of 16 regular season games at Maple Leaf Gardens in Toronto from 1971 to 1975, while the Toronto Raptors played a preseason game at Marine Midland Arena in Buffalo in 1996 and had a second game scheduled for 1998 that was cancelled due to the 1998–99 NBA lockout. The Raptors have discussed the possibility of playing additional preseason and regular season games in Buffalo, while the Toronto Blue Jays have considered playing an exhibition game in Buffalo, which is home to their Triple-A affiliate the Buffalo Bisons, having previously played the Cleveland Indians in an exhibition game at War Memorial Stadium in 1987. In 1974, the Toronto-Buffalo Royals of World Team Tennis (WTT) simultaneously called both cities home, playing half their home matches at the CNE Coliseum in Toronto and the other half at the Buffalo Memorial Auditorium. The franchise was originally granted to Toronto to begin play in WTT's inaugural 1974 season, but management decided to play in both cities. The Royals were sold and moved to Hartford, Connecticut following the 1974 season, but folded on February 1, 1975, without ever playing another match.

Rogers Centre's American football-specific capacity of 53,506 was slightly lower than the number of seats for a stadium to be a viable venue for a permanent Toronto team, as all other NFL stadiums have at least 60,000 seats as of 2011 (the league has a minimum capacity requirement of 50,000). It is typically configured at 49,500 seats for Blue Jays baseball, though more were added for the 2008 Bills games for a total of 53,506.

Toronto Series games were the only NFL games not subject to the league's blackout restrictions. For instance, the 2010 Toronto Series preseason game had nearly 15,000 available seats but was still seen on television within the stadium's blackout zone. All of the Bills Toronto Series games aired either at 4 p.m. or during Thursday Night Football; Rogers owned the Canadian television rights to NFL games aired in those time slots (whereas rival Bell Media owned the rights to all other NFL games).

== History ==
=== Original deal ===
In September 2006, Tanenbaum and Rogers held a news conference, where the two men discussed bringing an NFL franchise to Toronto. Neither specified whether a potential Toronto team would be a new franchise or a team moved from another city. Tanenbaum was quoted as saying, "I'm highly interested in an NFL team and Ted is, too. We hope to pursue it more rigorously as soon as the NFL gives us the word."

In October 2007, Bills owner Ralph Wilson petitioned NFL owners to allow his team to play one "home" game per year (over five years) in Canada. NFL commissioner Roger Goodell approved the plan, which also allowed the Bills to play a pre-season "home" game at Rogers Centre every other year of the Series (2008, 2010, 2012) for a total of eight games in Toronto. In February 2008, Wilson avoided questions about a possible permanent move for the Bills to Toronto while discussing "high rates" for Series ticket prices. The deal Wilson struck with the Toronto group allowed them to bid on and relocate other available NFL franchises up for sale.

Rogers Communications reported a Series payment of CA$78 million to the Buffalo Bills in their Q1 2008 financial report, which, according to Forbes, was more than the team earned (in operating income) in 2006. The series set the record for the largest gate revenue for a single event in the history of the Rogers Centre, at C$8 million, although this was later surpassed by UFC 129.

=== Renewal ===
On May 22, 2012, the league gave their approval for a five-year extension to the Bills Toronto Series through 2017 should the two sides reach an agreement. The deal, featuring one regular season game each year plus a pre-season game in 2015, was formally announced on January 29, 2013. Financial terms of the renewal agreement were not disclosed, but it was reported that Rogers paid roughly half of the $78 million the original deal cost.

With the series entering its second phase, a perceived lack of interest amongst Toronto fans and the diminishing crowds attending games were criticized. The first four years of the series were widely suspected to have included large ticket giveaways ("'papering' the stadium") in order to increase attendance. A large attendance drop from about 50,000 to 40,000 occurred in 2012 as the practice wound down, while attendance fell even further during the first year of the new deal in 2013. Attendance concerns led to a scaling back of strategic objectives. At the time of renewal, the series was presented as a simple business deal offering lucrative NFL content to Rogers and increased revenue to the Bills with no hint of possible team relocation.

=== Reception in Buffalo ===
With the future of Bills continually in doubt, fan reaction in Buffalo to the Toronto series ranged from "outright anger [to] begrudging acceptance" that the revenue provided helped the team. Many Buffalo fans refused to attend games in Toronto. Specific fan objections to the Toronto games included the perception that Rogers Centre is less raucous than Orchard Park and that the city is a neutral site rather than a home game. Bills CEO Russ Brandon suggested that the team deserved some of the blame for this, as the Bills did not field a competitive team since the series was launched. Poor turf was also noted in the Rogers Centre. Also, the playing of the games late in the season meant the Bills lost the advantage of being acclimatized to playing in cold, wintery conditions that visiting teams are unused to.

Brandon noted one success: attendance by Canadian fans at Ralph Wilson Stadium had increased from 11% to 20% at the time of the renewal agreement. Brandon said that "Southern Ontario and the Toronto market and the GTA (Greater Toronto Area) are now the top secondary market of the Buffalo Bills". The Bills in Toronto has been widely held up as an effort at "regionalization" by the franchise.

=== Postponement and cancellation ===
Following the first game of the renewal in 2013, Brandon brought the future of the series into question by stating that he intended to conduct a thorough review of the series. He described Toronto as a "challenged market" for the Bills and stated that the series "has not translated into enough wins for us there". The Bills record in the Toronto series was (at the time) 1 win and 5 losses. When asked if the Bills were able to void the final years of the contract, Brandon responded that he was "going to look at everything". Reports suggested that the series can only be ended with the mutual consent of both parties. However, Brandon also emphasized the financial benefits of the series by saying that it has "taken a game out of the [Buffalo] market that has essentially taken 70,000 seats out of our market, and we've truly only sold out two of our home games". He went on to say "we've manufactured sellouts in the other four or five. We're trying to find ways to obviously keep this team viable and we've done a very good job, and this [Toronto] series has obviously contributed to that." Brandon also said that the additional game would "stress-test the Buffalo market".

On March 5, 2014, the Bills and Rogers released a joint statement which announced that they had "postponed for one year the scheduled 2014 regular season game at Rogers Centre" and that they would "use this time to collectively evaluate opportunities and build on the foundation to enhance future games." Brandon described it as "a one-year postponement to go into a deeper dive of evaluation about the future" so that the team had "a more robust fan experience and try to create more of a home field advantage for us." Keith Pelley, President of Rogers Communications, said that "the plan is to postpone it for one year, regroup and determine what's the next best step". Pelley said that "there's no hiding the fact the series did not get off to a rosy start" and that "it's tough midway through to change that perception, hence the reason why we thought it would be a best to take a year off then re-launch it once we've thought that through."

According to Pelley, the contract between the Bills and Rogers was "not nullified" and was still in force. The games were planned to be resumed in 2015, though more negotiations between the parties on the series were scheduled. Pelley also raised the possibility that the series would be replaced by an NFL International Series game not featuring the Bills.

Following the death of Wilson in late March 2014, Edward Rogers III and Larry Tanenbaum, board members of Toronto-based sports conglomerate Maple Leaf Sports & Entertainment, teamed with Jon Bon Jovi to submit a bid to purchase the team, with the expectation that they would relocate it to Toronto on a full-time basis. However, the team was ultimately sold to Kim and Terrence Pegula, who announced their intent to keep the team in Buffalo and end the Toronto Series in a November 2014 interview. On December 3, 2014, it was announced that the Bills and Rogers Communications had reached an agreement to cancel the Toronto Series.

The Toronto Argonauts then moved to a reconfigured and expanded BMO Field in the 2016 CFL season, and the Rogers Centre was resurfaced with a permanent baseball turf attached to the stadium's floor before the 2021 baseball season, locking the Rogers Centre permanently into a baseball configuration. As BMO Field can only be expanded to 40,000 seats (with 10,000 of them temporary), 10,000 seats under the NFL's minimum capacity, and with the Bills' new stadium opening in 2026, a renewal of the series is unlikely for the foreseeable future.

=== 2025 partnership with MLSE ===
On September 9, 2025, the Bills and MLSE jointly announced a new strategic partnership, intending to engage Canadian fans and grow the game of football. When asked about the possibility of Toronto again hosting future Bills games, team COO Pete Guelli and MLSE president Keith Pelley did not rule it out, but Guelli stated that the Bills' focus in the short term is opening their new stadium, New Highmark Stadium.

== Yearly summaries ==
=== 2008 ===
The Bills played two games (one pre-season) in 2008 at Rogers Centre. The pre-season opponent was the Pittsburgh Steelers. The Bills defeated the Steelers 24–21 on August 14, 2008. In the regular season, the Bills played (and lost to) the Miami Dolphins 16–3 on December 7 in front of 52,134 in attendance. The Rogers Centre's roof was closed for the game, which meant the region's normally cold and windy December conditions with a gametime temperature of 16 °F (−9 °C) wouldn't influence the game. Ticket prices for the Series were announced in May, and averaged C$183 per seat. In Buffalo, Bills tickets averaged C$51 per seat. The Dolphins became the first team to play both an International Series and Toronto Series game from both games' inception.

=== 2009 ===
The Bills lost to the New York Jets, 19–13, in front of 51,567 under the roof at Rogers Centre on December 3. There was no pre-season game at Rogers Centre in 2009. In 2009, the Bills Toronto Series also announced a ticket price reduction plan, cutting prices by an average of 17% and offering more than 11,000 tickets for less than C$99. Rogers Communications offered partial refunds to ticketholders who had purchased seats in 2008 and who were affected by the price reduction.

=== 2010 ===
The preseason game, which took place August 19, featured the Bills hosting the Indianapolis Colts. The Bills defeated the Colts 34–21.

For the first time, the 2010 regular-season Toronto game took place during the 2010 CFL season and not after it; it was played on November 7, the last week of the CFL's regular season, with a 1:00 p.m. start (the Toronto Argonauts played the Montreal Alouettes in Montreal on the same day, but with a 4:00 p.m. start). The Bills faced the Chicago Bears, marking the first time a team from the NFC appeared in the series. As part of the NFL Television Contract the game was broadcast by Fox for the first time and not CBS. The Bills relinquished a five-point mid-fourth-quarter lead, falling 22–19 to the Bears.

=== 2011 ===
The Bills played host to the Washington Redskins for the 2011 Toronto Series on Sunday, October 30, at 4:05 p.m. The Bills, in their first regular-season win in the series, defeated the Redskins 23–0, the first time Redskins coach Mike Shanahan had been shut out in his career. The game marked the peak of the Bills' fortunes that season, with the Bills reaching 5–2; a series of key injuries led to the team collapsing over the next several games to fall out of playoff contention for the twelfth straight year.

This season also marked the 20th anniversary of the Bills playing the Redskins in Super Bowl XXVI. It marked the only time in the Toronto Series that attendance rose over the previous season, with the game seeing a slight increase from 50,746 to 51,579, significantly below the team's average of 69,282 that year. After this game, the attendance numbers dropped markedly over the next two seasons, dropping below 40,000 in 2013, contributing to the team's decision to postpone the series at the end of that year.

=== 2012 ===
The pre-season game originally scheduled for the fifth year of the series was cancelled, as home games for the Toronto Blue Jays and Toronto Argonauts and a Bruce Springsteen concert conflicted with the NFL pre-season. The lone available weekend on the Rogers Centre schedule coincided with the Bills' home game against the Pittsburgh Steelers (whom the Bills played in their 2008 preseason game); that game was moved to Ralph Wilson Stadium and designated the team's annual "Kids Day."

The Bills faced the Seattle Seahawks in their regular-season Toronto Series game on December 16, at 4:05 p.m. Eastern Time on Fox. In Canada this game was broadcast on Citytv. The Seahawks defeated the Bills 50–17. The half time performance was Psy who performed his hit "Gangnam Style".

=== 2013 ===
The Bills hosted the Atlanta Falcons on December 1, 2013 at 4:05 p.m. They lost 34–31 in overtime. The lead see-sawed throughout the match, with the Bills holding on 31–24 late in the fourth quarter. A pass interference call against the Bills allowed Atlanta a touchdown from the one-yard line with 1:28 remaining. With 28 seconds remaining Bills' quarterback EJ Manuel completed a pass to Stevie Johnson, which likely would have set up a game-winning field goal. However, Johnson fumbled on the play and Atlanta recovered the ball to send the game to overtime. Another Bills fumble in overtime set up Matt Bryant's winning field goal for Atlanta. Halftime entertainment was provided by the Beach Boys. Fewer than 40,000 fans attended the game, the smallest crowd of the series.

== Game history ==
=== Preseason games ===
Date	Visitor	Score	Home	Stadium	Attendance
August 14, 2008	Pittsburgh Steelers	21–24	Buffalo Bills	Rogers Centre	48,434
August 19, 2010	Indianapolis Colts	21–34	Buffalo Bills	Rogers Centre	39,583

=== Regular season games ===
Date	Visitor	Score	Home	Venue	Attendance
December 7, 2008	Miami Dolphins	16–3	Buffalo Bills	Rogers Centre	52,134
December 3, 2009	New York Jets	19–13	Buffalo Bills	Rogers Centre	51,567
November 7, 2010	Chicago Bears	22–19	Buffalo Bills	Rogers Centre	50,746
October 30, 2011	Washington Redskins	0–23	Buffalo Bills	Rogers Centre	51,579
December 16, 2012	Seattle Seahawks	50–17	Buffalo Bills	Rogers Centre	40,770
December 1, 2013	Atlanta Falcons	34–31 (OT)	Buffalo Bills	Rogers Centre	38,969

== See also ==
- List of National Football League games played outside the United States
- NFL International Series
