= List of NFL games played outside the United States =

All National Football League (NFL) current and former teams have been based in the contiguous United States (U.S.), with only the Pro Bowl played in a non-contiguous state (Hawaii). The NFL, including predecessor leagues All-America Football Conference (AAFC) and American Football League (AFL), have played numerous games outside the U.S. Initially these were exhibition games played during the preseason. Prior to the AFL–NFL merger, all games were played in Canada and were oftentimes interleague matchups against Canadian Football League (CFL) teams. The league later expanded their efforts, with Brazil, Germany, Japan, Mexico, Spain, and the United Kingdom hosting multiple games. The first regular season game played outside of the U.S. was in Mexico City in 2005. As of 2025 seven countries have hosted regular season NFL games, with Australia and France each scheduled to host its first game in 2026.

== Canadian Football League interleague games ==
Six games held in Canada between 1950 and 1961 pitted NFL teams against Canadian Football League (CFL) (or precursor) teams. These games were a hybrid of American and Canadian football. Ottawa hosted the first two games, while Toronto hosted three and Montreal held one; the first game ever held in Toronto featuring an NFL team was in August 1959 and inaugurated the city's Exhibition Stadium. In addition, a game was played between the Brooklyn Dodgers of the All-America Football Conference (AAFC) and CFL's Montreal Alouettes in August 1948, with Brooklyn winning 27–1, and a game between the Buffalo Bills of the American Football League (AFL) and CFL's Hamilton Tiger-Cats in August 1961, with Hamilton winning 38–21. There was also a game in 1960 that pitted the Chicago Bears against the New York Giants played in Toronto; this was in return for a 1958 CFL matchup that was played in Philadelphia.

The Western Interprovincial Football Union (now the West Division of the CFL) was never involved in interleague play with the NFL, although its teams occasionally played members of other rival U.S. leagues in the circuit's early years. At the time, the Western teams were still struggling to gain recognition within Canada as the competitive equal to the Interprovincial Rugby Football Union (now the East Division of the CFL). A more practical factor inhibiting interleague play between the Western teams and the NFL was the prohibitive amount of time it would have taken to travel by rail from an NFL city to Western Canada for an exhibition game (the CFL did not even implement regular season interconference play until air travel came to be seen as a safe means of transport in the 1960s). Also, by the 1950s the Western teams were already playing their regular season in August while the Eastern teams still started their season around the same time as the NFL.

=== Interleague results ===
| Date | Canadian team | League | Points | American team | League | Points | Stadium |
|---|---|---|---|---|---|---|---|
| 26 August 1941 | Winnipeg Blue Bombers | WIFU | 19 | Columbus Bullies | AFL | 12 | Osborne Stadium, Winnipeg |
| 1 September 1941 | Winnipeg Blue Bombers | WIFU | 0 | Columbus Bullies | AFL | 6 | Osborne Stadium, Winnipeg |
| 10 September 1941 | Winnipeg Blue Bombers | WIFU | 1 | Columbus Bullies | AFL | 31 | Osborne Stadium, Winnipeg |
| 19 August 1948 | Montreal Alouettes | IRFU | 1 | Brooklyn Dodgers | AAFC | 27 | Delorimier Stadium, Montreal |
| 12 August 1950 | Ottawa Rough Riders | IRFU | 6 | New York Giants | NFL | 27 | Lansdowne Park, Ottawa |
| 11 August 1951 | Ottawa Rough Riders | IRFU | 18 | New York Giants | NFL | 41 | Lansdowne Park, Ottawa |
| 5 August 1959 | Toronto Argonauts | CFL | 26 | Chicago Cardinals | NFL | 55 | Exhibition Stadium, Toronto |
| 3 August 1960 | Toronto Argonauts | CFL | 16 | Pittsburgh Steelers | NFL | 43 | Exhibition Stadium, Toronto |
| 2 August 1961 | Toronto Argonauts | CFL | 7 | St Louis Cardinals | NFL | 36 | Exhibition Stadium, Toronto |
| 5 August 1961 | Montreal Alouettes | CFL | 16 | Chicago Bears | NFL | 34 | Molson Stadium, Montreal |
| 8 August 1961 | Hamilton Tiger-Cats | CFL | 38 | Buffalo Bills | AFL | 21 | Civic Stadium, Hamilton |

== Global Cup ==
In the summer of 1983, an English entrepreneur and former Hollywood screenwriter named John Marshall hired Wembley Stadium and brought the Minnesota Vikings and St. Louis Cardinals over to play a pre-season exhibition game called The Global Cup. Just over 30,000 fans turned out that day to witness the game. In 1984, Marshall invited the United States Football League's Tampa Bay Bandits and Philadelphia Stars to play a post season exhibition game in July.

== American Bowl ==
The American Bowl was a series of NFL pre-season exhibition games that were held at sites outside the United States between 1986 and 2005. The league started the American Bowl series in 1986 primarily to promote American football in other countries. The American Bowl was a fifth pre-season game, played the same weekend as the Pro Football Hall of Fame Game, and did not take away a game from the participating teams' pre-season schedules. At least one American Bowl game was played annually from 1986 to 2003. As many as four were played per year in the early 1990s. There was no American Bowl game played in 2004. The last American Bowl was held in 2005. NFL Commissioner Roger Goodell cited the league's new international strategy in the abandonment of international pre-season games as well as the closure of NFL Europe, instead focusing on playing regular season games in foreign countries. There have been three international pre-season games during the American Bowl era that did not receive the American Bowl name because they were not arranged by the NFL but, rather, the scheduled home team elected to play there.

== China Bowl ==
The China Bowl was the name of a proposed NFL pre-season exhibition game that had been scheduled to take place in August 2007, but later postponed to August 2009 so that more focus could be placed on the start of the International Series, and ultimately canceled, between the New England Patriots and the Seattle Seahawks at the National Stadium in Beijing. The originally scheduled China Bowl was to be played at Workers Stadium in Beijing, China, on August 8, 2007. The game was to kick off the one-year countdown before the 2008 Summer Olympics in Beijing and would have been the first NFL-sanctioned game to take place in China.

In March 2019, the NFL reportedly discussed at the owners' meetings whether it will play a game in China in the 2020 season. The San Francisco 49ers and Los Angeles Rams were among the teams interested, due to their West Coast locations allowing for shorter travel. It would have taken place prior to the start of the regular season for the rest of the league in order to make up for the intense travel and time difference. Suitable venue and air quality were other concerns.

== Fútbol Americano ==
On October 2, 2005, the Arizona Cardinals defeated the San Francisco 49ers by a score of 31–14 at Estadio Azteca in Mexico City, Mexico, under the name Fútbol Americano. It was the first regular season NFL game held outside the United States. The game drew the NFL's highest game attendance at the time with 103,467 spectators.

== NFL International Series ==
Beginning with the 2007 season, the National Football League has hosted regular season American football games outside the United States every year in a series known as the International Series. Wembley Stadium, in London, United Kingdom, was the first location to host the series, staging at least one game every year since the series began, except 2020 and 2021.

In October 2015, the league announced that a resolution had been passed approving continuing the International Series until 2025, expanding it to include games in international cities outside the United Kingdom. The NFL had an agreement to play at least two games per year at Wembley until 2020, with the Jacksonville Jaguars relocating a home game there annually throughout the agreement. In addition, three to five games were scheduled to take place at England national rugby union's Twickenham Stadium between 2016 and 2018, while at least two games per year were planned to be played at Tottenham Hotspur Stadium between 2018 and 2027 as part of an agreement with Tottenham Hotspur.

Additional markets under consideration included Mexico, Germany and Canada. On February 5, 2016, it was announced that the Oakland Raiders would host the Houston Texans on November 21, 2016, at Estadio Azteca in Mexico City, Mexico. On November 19, 2017, Estadio Azteca hosted a regular season Sunday afternoon game between the New England Patriots and the Raiders. On November 19, 2018, the Los Angeles Rams were the designated home team against the Kansas City Chiefs in Mexico, however the field conditions at Estadio Azteca did not meet NFL regulations so the game was moved to Los Angeles.

== Bills Toronto Series ==
The Bills Toronto Series was an agreement between the Buffalo Bills and Rogers Communications to host a series of Bills NFL games at the Rogers Centre in nearby Toronto, Ontario, Canada in an attempt by the team to broaden its fan base. The Bills Toronto Series was distinct from the NFL International Series because it was arranged by an individual team rather than the league.

The series was conceived by a group that included then Bills owner Ralph Wilson, Ted Rogers of Rogers Communications and Larry Tanenbaum of Maple Leaf Sports & Entertainment. During the original five-year deal, which began with the 2008 season, the Bills played one regular season home game per year as well as a pre-season home game at Rogers Centre in 2008 and 2010, for a total of seven games in Toronto. A pre-season game originally planned for 2012 was cancelled, as home games for the Toronto Blue Jays and Toronto Argonauts and a Bruce Springsteen concert conflicted with the NFL pre-season. In 2013, the series was renewed for five more years through 2017. The new deal featured one regular season game each year plus a pre-season game in 2015. However, following the first contest in 2013, it was announced that Rogers and the Bills had postponed the series for a year, and several months later, following the sale of the Bills to new ownership, the parties reached an agreement to cancel the Toronto Series permanently.

== Impact on teams ==
Teams that have had the scheduling disadvantage of giving up a home game to participate in the series, resulting in seven home games, eight away games and one neutral site game, have seen a significant disparity in their success relative to the designated visitors, who end up with eight home games, seven away games and one neutral site game. For the 18 regular season games played outside the United States through 2015, 20 of the 21 designated home teams failed to reach the playoffs while 11 of the 21 designated visitors reached the postseason that year. In 2015, the Kansas City Chiefs became the first designated home team to go on to reach the playoffs. However, many teams accept the tradeoff of an increased opportunity for international marketing.

== List of games ==
Below is a list of games played outside the United States by teams from the NFL, including the predecessor leagues American Football League (1926) (AFL 1926), All-America Football Conference (AAFC), and American Football League (AFL) from which the NFL absorbed teams.

Legend

Series

- AB = American Bowl
- BTS = Bills Toronto Series
- CB = China Bowl
- CFL = Canadian Football League interleague games
- FA = Fútbol Americano
- GC = Global Cup
- IS = NFL International Series
- MC = Molson Challenge
- MSB = Mainichi Star Bowl
- VAFC = Volvo American Football Classic

Type

- EXH = Exhibition game
- INT = Interleague game
- REG = Regular season game

| Season | Date | Series | Type | Winning/tied team | Score | Losing/tied team | Stadium | City | Country | Ref |
|---|---|---|---|---|---|---|---|---|---|---|
| 1926 | November 8 | – | REG | New York Yankees (AFL 1926) | 28–0 | Los Angeles Wildcats (AFL 1926) | Maple Leaf Stadium | Toronto | Canada | |
| 1948 | August 19 | CFL | INT | Brooklyn Dodgers (AAFC) | 27–1 | Montreal Alouettes (CFL) | Delorimier Stadium | Montreal | Canada | |
| 1950 | August 12 | CFL | INT | New York Giants | 27–6 | Ottawa Rough Riders (CFL) | Lansdowne Park | Ottawa | Canada | |
| 1951 | August 11 | CFL | INT | New York Giants | 41–18 | Ottawa Rough Riders (CFL) | Lansdowne Park | Ottawa | Canada | |
| 1959 | August 5 | CFL | INT | Chicago Cardinals | 55–26 | Toronto Argonauts (CFL) | Exhibition Stadium | Toronto | Canada | |
| 1960 | August 3 | CFL | INT | Pittsburgh Steelers | 43–16 | Toronto Argonauts (CFL) | Exhibition Stadium | Toronto | Canada | |
| 1960 | August 15 | – | EXH | Chicago Bears | 16–7 | New York Giants | Varsity Stadium | Toronto | Canada | |
| 1960 | August 29 | – | EXH | Dallas Cowboys | Cancelled | New York Giants | Delorimier Stadium | Montreal | Canada | |
| 1961 | August 2 | CFL | INT | St. Louis Cardinals | 36–7 | Toronto Argonauts (CFL) | Exhibition Stadium | Toronto | Canada | |
| 1961 | August 5 | CFL | INT | Chicago Bears | 34–16 | Montreal Alouettes (CFL) | Molson Stadium | Montreal | Canada | |
| 1961 | August 8 | CFL | INT | Hamilton Tiger-Cats (CFL) | 38–21 | Buffalo Bills (AFL) | Civic Stadium | Hamilton | Canada | |
| 1968 | August 11 | – | EXH | Detroit Lions | Cancelled | Philadelphia Eagles | Estadio Azteca | Mexico City | Mexico | |
| 1969 | August 25 | – | INT | Detroit Lions | 22–9 | Boston Patriots (AFL) | Jarry Park | Montreal | Canada | |
| 1969 | September 11 | – | EXH | Pittsburgh Steelers | 17–13 | New York Giants | Jarry Park | Montreal | Canada | |
| 1976 | August 16 | MSB | EXH | St. Louis Cardinals | 20–10 | San Diego Chargers | Korakuen Stadium | Tokyo | Japan | |
| 1978 | August 5 | – | EXH | New Orleans Saints | 14–7 | Philadelphia Eagles | Estadio Olímpico de la Ciudad de los Deportes | Mexico City | Mexico | |
| 1983 | August 6 | GC | EXH | Minnesota Vikings | 28–10 | St. Louis Cardinals | Wembley Stadium | London | United Kingdom | |
| 1986 | August 3 | AB | EXH | Chicago Bears | 17–6 | Dallas Cowboys | Wembley Stadium | London | United Kingdom | |
| 1987 | August 9 | AB | EXH | Los Angeles Rams | 28–27 | Denver Broncos | Wembley Stadium | London | United Kingdom | |
| 1988 | July 31 | AB | EXH | Miami Dolphins | 27–21 | San Francisco 49ers | Wembley Stadium | London | United Kingdom | |
| 1988 | August 14 | VAFC | EXH | Minnesota Vikings | 28–21 | Chicago Bears | Ullevi Stadium | Gothenburg | Sweden | |
| 1988 | August 18 | MC | EXH | New York Jets | 11–7 | Cleveland Browns | Olympic Stadium | Montreal | Canada | |
| 1988 | August 27 | – | EXH | Tampa Bay Buccaneers | Cancelled | Buffalo Bills | Exhibition Stadium | Toronto | Canada | |
| 1989 | August 6 | AB | EXH | Los Angeles Rams | 16–13 (OT) | San Francisco 49ers | Tokyo Dome | Tokyo | Japan | |
| 1989 | August 6 | AB | EXH | Philadelphia Eagles | 17–13 | Cleveland Browns | Wembley Stadium | London | United Kingdom | |
| 1990 | August 5 | AB | EXH | Denver Broncos | 10–7 | Seattle Seahawks | Tokyo Dome | Tokyo | Japan | |
| 1990 | August 5 | AB | EXH | New Orleans Saints | 17–10 | Los Angeles Raiders | Wembley Stadium | London | United Kingdom | |
| 1990 | August 9 | AB | EXH | Pittsburgh Steelers | 30–14 | New England Patriots | Olympic Stadium | Montreal | Canada | |
| 1990 | August 11 | AB | EXH | Los Angeles Rams | 19–3 | Kansas City Chiefs | Olympiastadion | West Berlin | West Germany | |
| 1991 | July 28 | AB | EXH | Buffalo Bills | 17–13 | Philadelphia Eagles | Wembley Stadium | London | United Kingdom | |
| 1991 | August 3 | AB | EXH | San Francisco 49ers | 21–7 | Chicago Bears | Olympiastadion | Berlin | Germany | |
| 1991 | August 4 | AB | EXH | Miami Dolphins | 19–17 | Los Angeles Raiders | Tokyo Dome | Tokyo | Japan | |
| 1992 | August 2 | AB | EXH | Houston Oilers | 34–23 | Dallas Cowboys | Tokyo Dome | Tokyo | Japan | |
| 1992 | August 15 | AB | EXH | Miami Dolphins | 31–27 | Denver Broncos | Olympiastadion | Berlin | Germany | |
| 1992 | August 16 | AB | EXH | San Francisco 49ers | 17–15 | Washington Redskins | Wembley Stadium | London | United Kingdom | |
| 1993 | August 1 | AB | EXH | New Orleans Saints | 28–16 | Philadelphia Eagles | Tokyo Dome | Tokyo | Japan | |
| 1993 | August 1 | AB | EXH | San Francisco 49ers | 21–14 | Pittsburgh Steelers | Estadi Olímpic | Barcelona | Spain | |
| 1993 | August 7 | AB | EXH | Minnesota Vikings | 20–6 | Buffalo Bills | Olympiastadion | Berlin | Germany | |
| 1993 | August 8 | AB | EXH | Dallas Cowboys | 13–13 (OT) | Detroit Lions | Wembley Stadium | London | United Kingdom | |
| 1993 | August 14 | – | EXH | Cleveland Browns | 12–9 | New England Patriots | SkyDome | Toronto | Canada | |
| 1994 | July 31 | AB | EXH | Los Angeles Raiders | 25–22 (OT) | Denver Broncos | Estadi Olímpic | Barcelona | Spain | |
| 1994 | August 7 | AB | EXH | Minnesota Vikings | 17–9 | Kansas City Chiefs | Tokyo Dome | Tokyo | Japan | |
| 1994 | August 13 | AB | EXH | New York Giants | 28–20 | San Diego Chargers | Olympiastadion | Berlin | Germany | |
| 1994 | August 15 | AB | EXH | Houston Oilers | 6–0 | Dallas Cowboys | Estadio Azteca | Mexico City | Mexico | |
| 1995 | August 6 | AB | EXH | Denver Broncos | 24–10 | San Francisco 49ers | Tokyo Dome | Tokyo | Japan | |
| 1995 | August 12 | AB | EXH | Buffalo Bills | 9–7 | Dallas Cowboys | SkyDome | Toronto | Canada | |
| 1996 | July 28 | AB | EXH | San Diego Chargers | 20–10 | Pittsburgh Steelers | Tokyo Dome | Tokyo | Japan | |
| 1996 | August 5 | AB | EXH | Kansas City Chiefs | 32–6 | Dallas Cowboys | Estadio Universitario | Monterrey | Mexico | |
| 1997 | July 27 | AB | EXH | Pittsburgh Steelers | 30–17 | Chicago Bears | Croke Park | Dublin | Ireland | |
| 1997 | August 4 | AB | EXH | Miami Dolphins | 38–19 | Denver Broncos | Estadio Guillermo Cañedo | Mexico City | Mexico | |
| 1997 | August 16 | AB | EXH | Green Bay Packers | 35–3 | Buffalo Bills | SkyDome | Toronto | Canada | |
| 1998 | August 2 | AB | EXH | Green Bay Packers | 27–24 (OT) | Kansas City Chiefs | Tokyo Dome | Tokyo | Japan | |
| 1998 | August 15 | AB | EXH | San Francisco 49ers | 24–21 | Seattle Seahawks | BC Place Stadium | Vancouver | Canada | |
| 1998 | August 17 | AB | EXH | New England Patriots | 21–3 | Dallas Cowboys | Estadio Azteca | Mexico City | Mexico | |
| 1999 | August 8 | AB | EXH | Denver Broncos | 20–17 | San Diego Chargers | Stadium Australia | Sydney | Australia | |
| 2000 | August 6 | AB | EXH | Atlanta Falcons | 20–9 | Dallas Cowboys | Tokyo Dome | Tokyo | Japan | |
| 2000 | August 19 | AB | EXH | Indianapolis Colts | 24–23 | Pittsburgh Steelers | Estadio Azteca | Mexico City | Mexico | |
| 2001 | August 27 | AB | EXH | Dallas Cowboys | 21–6 | Oakland Raiders | Estadio Azteca | Mexico City | Mexico | |
| 2002 | August 3 | AB | EXH | Washington Redskins | 38–7 | San Francisco 49ers | Osaka Dome | Osaka | Japan | |
| 2003 | August 2 | AB | EXH | Tampa Bay Buccaneers | 30–14 | New York Jets | Tokyo Dome | Tokyo | Japan | |
| 2005 | August 6 | AB | EXH | Atlanta Falcons | 27–21 | Indianapolis Colts | Tokyo Dome | Tokyo | Japan | |
| 2005 | October 2 | FA | REG | Arizona Cardinals | 31–14 | San Francisco 49ers | Estadio Azteca | Mexico City | Mexico | |
| 2007 | August 8 | CB | EXH | Seattle Seahawks | Cancelled | New England Patriots | Workers' Stadium | Beijing | China | |
| 2007 | October 28 | IS | REG | New York Giants | 13–10 | Miami Dolphins | Wembley Stadium | London | United Kingdom | |
| 2008 | August 14 | BTS | EXH | Buffalo Bills | 24–21 | Pittsburgh Steelers | Rogers Centre | Toronto | Canada | |
| 2008 | October 26 | IS | REG | New Orleans Saints | 37–32 | San Diego Chargers | Wembley Stadium | London | United Kingdom | |
| 2008 | December 7 | BTS | REG | Miami Dolphins | 16–3 | Buffalo Bills | Rogers Centre | Toronto | Canada | |
| 2009 | October 25 | IS | REG | New England Patriots | 35–7 | Tampa Bay Buccaneers | Wembley Stadium | London | United Kingdom | |
| 2009 | December 3 | BTS | REG | New York Jets | 19–13 | Buffalo Bills | Rogers Centre | Toronto | Canada | |
| 2010 | August 19 | BTS | EXH | Buffalo Bills | 34–21 | Indianapolis Colts | Rogers Centre | Toronto | Canada | |
| 2010 | October 31 | IS | REG | San Francisco 49ers | 24–16 | Denver Broncos | Wembley Stadium | London | United Kingdom | |
| 2010 | November 7 | BTS | REG | Chicago Bears | 22–19 | Buffalo Bills | Rogers Centre | Toronto | Canada | |
| 2011 | October 23 | IS | REG | Chicago Bears | 24–18 | Tampa Bay Buccaneers | Wembley Stadium | London | United Kingdom | |
| 2011 | October 30 | BTS | REG | Buffalo Bills | 23–0 | Washington Redskins | Rogers Centre | Toronto | Canada | |
| 2012 | October 28 | IS | REG | New England Patriots | 45–7 | St. Louis Rams | Wembley Stadium | London | United Kingdom | |
| 2012 | December 16 | BTS | REG | Seattle Seahawks | 50–17 | Buffalo Bills | Rogers Centre | Toronto | Canada | |
| 2013 | September 29 | IS | REG | Minnesota Vikings | 34–27 | Pittsburgh Steelers | Wembley Stadium | London | United Kingdom | |
| 2013 | October 27 | IS | REG | San Francisco 49ers | 42–10 | Jacksonville Jaguars | Wembley Stadium | London | United Kingdom | |
| 2013 | December 1 | BTS | REG | Atlanta Falcons | 34–31 (OT) | Buffalo Bills | Rogers Centre | Toronto | Canada | |
| 2014 | September 28 | IS | REG | Miami Dolphins | 38–14 | Oakland Raiders | Wembley Stadium | London | United Kingdom | |
| 2014 | October 26 | IS | REG | Detroit Lions | 22–21 | Atlanta Falcons | Wembley Stadium | London | United Kingdom | |
| 2014 | November 9 | IS | REG | Dallas Cowboys | 31–17 | Jacksonville Jaguars | Wembley Stadium | London | United Kingdom | |
| 2015 | October 4 | IS | REG | New York Jets | 27–14 | Miami Dolphins | Wembley Stadium | London | United Kingdom | |
| 2015 | October 25 | IS | REG | Jacksonville Jaguars | 34–31 | Buffalo Bills | Wembley Stadium | London | United Kingdom | |
| 2015 | November 1 | IS | REG | Kansas City Chiefs | 45–10 | Detroit Lions | Wembley Stadium | London | United Kingdom | |
| 2016 | October 2 | IS | REG | Jacksonville Jaguars | 30–27 | Indianapolis Colts | Wembley Stadium | London | United Kingdom | |
| 2016 | October 23 | IS | REG | New York Giants | 17–10 | Los Angeles Rams | Twickenham Stadium | London | United Kingdom | |
| 2016 | October 30 | IS | REG | Washington Redskins | 27–27 (OT) | Cincinnati Bengals | Wembley Stadium | London | United Kingdom | |
| 2016 | November 21 | IS | REG | Oakland Raiders | 27–20 | Houston Texans | Estadio Azteca | Mexico City | Mexico | |
| 2017 | September 24 | IS | REG | Jacksonville Jaguars | 44–7 | Baltimore Ravens | Wembley Stadium | London | United Kingdom | |
| 2017 | October 1 | IS | REG | New Orleans Saints | 20–0 | Miami Dolphins | Wembley Stadium | London | United Kingdom | |
| 2017 | October 22 | IS | REG | Los Angeles Rams | 33–0 | Arizona Cardinals | Twickenham Stadium | London | United Kingdom | |
| 2017 | October 29 | IS | REG | Minnesota Vikings | 33–16 | Cleveland Browns | Twickenham Stadium | London | United Kingdom | |
| 2017 | November 19 | IS | REG | New England Patriots | 33–8 | Oakland Raiders | Estadio Azteca | Mexico City | Mexico | |
| 2018 | October 14 | IS | REG | Seattle Seahawks | 27–3 | Oakland Raiders | Wembley Stadium | London | United Kingdom | |
| 2018 | October 21 | IS | REG | Los Angeles Chargers | 20–19 | Tennessee Titans | Wembley Stadium | London | United Kingdom | |
| 2018 | October 28 | IS | REG | Philadelphia Eagles | 24–18 | Jacksonville Jaguars | Wembley Stadium | London | United Kingdom | |
| 2018 | November 19 | IS | REG | Los Angeles Rams | Relocated to LA | Kansas City Chiefs | Estadio Azteca | Mexico City | Mexico | |
| 2019 | August 23 | − | EXH | Oakland Raiders | 22–21 | Green Bay Packers | Investors Group Field | Winnipeg | Canada | |
| 2019 | October 6 | IS | REG | Oakland Raiders | 24–21 | Chicago Bears | Tottenham Hotspur Stadium | London | United Kingdom | |
| 2019 | October 13 | IS | REG | Carolina Panthers | 37–26 | Tampa Bay Buccaneers | Tottenham Hotspur Stadium | London | United Kingdom | |
| 2019 | October 27 | IS | REG | Cincinnati Bengals | 10–24 | Los Angeles Rams | Wembley Stadium | London | United Kingdom | |
| 2019 | November 3 | IS | REG | Houston Texans | 26–3 | Jacksonville Jaguars | Wembley Stadium | London | United Kingdom | |
| 2019 | November 18 | IS | REG | Kansas City Chiefs | 24–17 | Los Angeles Chargers | Estadio Azteca | Mexico City | Mexico | |
| 2021 | October 10 | IS | REG | Atlanta Falcons | 27–20 | New York Jets | Tottenham Hotspur Stadium | London | United Kingdom | |
| 2021 | October 17 | IS | REG | Jacksonville Jaguars | 23–20 | Miami Dolphins | Tottenham Hotspur Stadium | London | United Kingdom | |
| 2022 | October 2 | IS | REG | Minnesota Vikings | 28–25 | New Orleans Saints | Tottenham Hotspur Stadium | London | United Kingdom | |
| 2022 | October 9 | IS | REG | New York Giants | 27–22 | Green Bay Packers | Tottenham Hotspur Stadium | London | United Kingdom | |
| 2022 | October 30 | IS | REG | Denver Broncos | 21–17 | Jacksonville Jaguars | Wembley Stadium | London | United Kingdom | |
| 2022 | November 13 | IS | REG | Tampa Bay Buccaneers | 21–16 | Seattle Seahawks | Allianz Arena | Munich | Germany | |
| 2022 | November 21 | IS | REG | San Francisco 49ers | 38–10 | Arizona Cardinals | Estadio Azteca | Mexico City | Mexico | |
| 2023 | October 1 | IS | REG | Jacksonville Jaguars | 23–7 | Atlanta Falcons | Wembley Stadium | London | United Kingdom | |
| 2023 | October 8 | IS | REG | Jacksonville Jaguars | 25–20 | Buffalo Bills | Tottenham Hotspur Stadium | London | United Kingdom | |
| 2023 | October 15 | IS | REG | Baltimore Ravens | 24–16 | Tennessee Titans | Tottenham Hotspur Stadium | London | United Kingdom | |
| 2023 | November 5 | IS | REG | Kansas City Chiefs | 21–14 | Miami Dolphins | Deutsche Bank Park | Frankfurt | Germany | |
| 2023 | November 12 | IS | REG | Indianapolis Colts | 10–6 | New England Patriots | Deutsche Bank Park | Frankfurt | Germany | |
| 2024 | September 6 | IS | REG | Philadelphia Eagles | 34–29 | Green Bay Packers | Arena Corinthians | São Paulo | Brazil | |
| 2024 | October 6 | IS | REG | Minnesota Vikings | 23–17 | New York Jets | Tottenham Hotspur Stadium | London | United Kingdom | |
| 2024 | October 13 | IS | REG | Chicago Bears | 35–16 | Jacksonville Jaguars | Tottenham Hotspur Stadium | London | United Kingdom | |
| 2024 | October 20 | IS | REG | Jacksonville Jaguars | 32–16 | New England Patriots | Wembley Stadium | London | United Kingdom | |
| 2024 | November 10 | IS | REG | Carolina Panthers | 20–17 (OT) | New York Giants | Allianz Arena | Munich | Germany | |
| 2025 | September 5 | IS | REG | Los Angeles Chargers | 27–21 | Kansas City Chiefs | Arena Corinthians | São Paulo | Brazil | |
| 2025 | September 28 | IS | REG | Pittsburgh Steelers | 24–21 | Minnesota Vikings | Croke Park | Dublin | Ireland | |
| 2025 | October 5 | IS | REG | Minnesota Vikings | 21–17 | Cleveland Browns | Tottenham Hotspur Stadium | London | United Kingdom | |
| 2025 | October 12 | IS | REG | Denver Broncos | 13–11 | New York Jets | Tottenham Hotspur Stadium | London | United Kingdom | |
| 2025 | October 19 | IS | REG | Los Angeles Rams | 35–7 | Jacksonville Jaguars | Wembley Stadium | London | United Kingdom | |
| 2025 | November 9 | IS | REG | Indianapolis Colts | 31–25 (OT) | Atlanta Falcons | Olympiastadion | Berlin | Germany | |
| 2025 | November 16 | IS | REG | Miami Dolphins | 16–13 (OT) | Washington Commanders | Bernabéu | Madrid | Spain | |
| 2026 | September 11 (Note: September 10 in U.S. time zones) | IS | REG | San Francisco 49ers | 27–7 | Los Angeles Rams | Melbourne Cricket Ground | Melbourne | Australia | |
| 2026 | September 27 | IS | REG | Baltimore Ravens | 34-31 | Dallas Cowboys | Maracanã Stadium | Rio de Janeiro | Brazil | |
| 2026 | October 4 | IS | REG | Indianapolis Colts | 30-13 | Washington Commanders | Tottenham Hotspur Stadium | London | United Kingdom | |
| 2026 | October 11 | IS | REG | Jacksonville Jaguars | 19-17 | Philadelphia Eagles | Tottenham Hotspur Stadium | London | United Kingdom | |
| 2026 | October 18 | IS | REG | Houston Texans | 34-31 | Jacksonville Jaguars | Wembley Stadium | London | United Kingdom | |
| 2026 | October 25 | IS | REG | Pittsburgh Steelers | 16-10 | New Orleans Saints | Stade de France | Paris | France | |
| 2026 | November 8 | IS | REG | Cincinnati Bengals | 34-17 | Atlanta Falcons | Bernabéu | Madrid | Spain | |
| 2026 | November 15 | IS | REG | Detroit Lions | 35-10 | New England Patriots | Allianz Arena | Munich | Germany | |
| 2026 | November 22 | IS | REG | San Francisco 49ers | | Minnesota Vikings | Estadio Azteca | Mexico City | Mexico | |
| 2027 | TBA | IS | REG | TBA | | TBA | Olympiastadion | Berlin | Germany | |
| 2027 | TBA | IS | REG | TBA | | TBA | Estadio Azteca | Mexico City | Mexico | |
| 2027 | TBA | IS | REG | TBA | | TBA | Tottenham Hotspur Stadium | London | United Kingdom | |
| 2027 | TBA | IS | REG | TBA | | TBA | Tottenham Hotspur Stadium | London | United Kingdom | |
| 2027 | TBA | IS | REG | Jacksonville Jaguars | | TBA | Wembley Stadium | London | United Kingdom | |
| 2028 | TBA | IS | REG | TBA | | TBA | Allianz Arena | Munich | Germany | |
| 2028 | TBA | IS | REG | TBA | | TBA | Estadio Azteca | Mexico City | Mexico | |
| 2029 | TBA | IS | REG | TBA | | TBA | Olympiastadion | Berlin | Germany | |

=== Number of games by city ===
| City | Country | NFL (includes predecessor leagues) (Note: Only includes games through 2025 season) | | | | | |
| City | Country | REG | EXH | INT | TOT | First game | Most recent game |
|---|---|---|---|---|---|---|---|
| Barcelona | Spain | 0 | 2 | 0 | 2 | 1993 | 1994 |
| Berlin (Note: Includes one game played in West Berlin prior to German reunification) | Germany | 1 | 5 | 0 | 6 | 1990 | 2025 |
| Dublin | Ireland | 1 | 1 | 0 | 2 | 1997 | 2025 |
| Frankfurt | Germany | 2 | 0 | 0 | 2 | 2023 | 2023 |
| Gothenburg | Sweden | 0 | 1 | 0 | 1 | 1988 | 1988 |
| Hamilton | Canada | 0 | 0 | 1 | 1 | 1961 | 1961 |
| London | United Kingdom | 42 | 9 | 0 | 51 | 1983 | 2025 |
| Madrid | Spain | 1 | 0 | 0 | 1 | 2025 | 2025 |
| Melbourne (Note: New city or country debuting during 2026 season) | Australia | 0 | 0 | 0 | 0 | 2026 | 2026 |
| Mexico City | Mexico | 5 | 6 | 0 | 11 | 1978 | 2022 |
| Monterrey | Mexico | 0 | 1 | 0 | 1 | 1996 | 1996 |
| Montreal | Canada | 0 | 3 | 3 | 6 | 1948 | 1990 |
| Munich | Germany | 2 | 0 | 0 | 2 | 2022 | 2024 |
| Osaka | Japan | 0 | 1 | 0 | 1 | 2002 | 2002 |
| Ottawa | Canada | 0 | 0 | 2 | 2 | 1950 | 1951 |
| Paris | France | 0 | 0 | 0 | 0 | 2026 | 2026 |
| Rio de Janeiro | Brazil | 0 | 0 | 0 | 0 | 2026 | 2026 |
| São Paulo | Brazil | 2 | 0 | 0 | 2 | 2024 | 2025 |
| Sydney | Australia | 0 | 1 | 0 | 1 | 1999 | 1999 |
| Tokyo | Japan | 0 | 13 | 0 | 13 | 1976 | 2005 |
| Toronto | Canada | 7 | 6 | 3 | 16 | 1926 | 2013 |
| Vancouver | Canada | 0 | 1 | 0 | 1 | 1998 | 1998 |
| Winnipeg | Canada | 0 | 1 | 0 | 1 | 2019 | 2019 |

=== Number of games by country ===
| Country | NFL (includes predecessor leagues) | | | | | |
| Country | REG | EXH | INT | TOT | First game | Most recent game |
|---|---|---|---|---|---|---|
| Australia | 0 | 1 | 0 | 1 | 1999 | 1999 |
| Brazil | 2 | 0 | 0 | 2 | 2024 | 2025 |
| Canada | 7 | 11 | 9 | 27 | 1926 | 2019 |
| France | 0 | 0 | 0 | 0 | 2026 | 2026 |
| Germany | 5 | 5 | 0 | 10 | 1990 | 2025 |
| Ireland | 1 | 1 | 0 | 2 | 1997 | 2025 |
| Japan | 0 | 14 | 0 | 14 | 1976 | 2005 |
| Mexico | 5 | 7 | 0 | 12 | 1978 | 2022 |
| Spain | 1 | 2 | 0 | 3 | 1993 | 2025 |
| Sweden | 0 | 1 | 0 | 1 | 1988 | 1988 |
| United Kingdom | 42 | 9 | 0 | 51 | 1983 | 2025 |
| Total | 62 | 51 | 9 | 122 | — | — |

== See also ==
- List of neutral site Canadian Football League games
- List of college football games played outside the United States
- List of Major League Baseball games played outside the United States and Canada
