= Keith Pelley =

Canadian sports executive (born 1964)

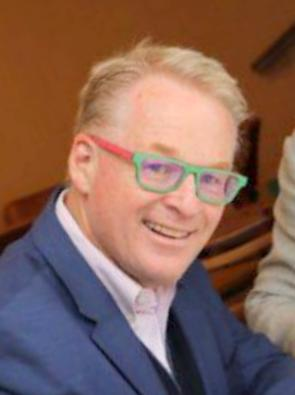
- Pelley in 2019
- Born: January 11, 1964 (age 62)
- Education: Toronto Metropolitan University
- Occupations: President & CEO
- Employer: Maple Leaf Sports & Entertainment (MLSE)

Keith W. Pelley (born January 11, 1964) is a Canadian sports executive who is the president and CEO of Maple Leaf Sports & Entertainment (MLSE). He has previously served as president of the PGA European Tour, the CEO of Rogers Media, team president of the Toronto Argonauts, and the president of The Sports Network (TSN).

== Biography ==
=== Early life ===
Pelley grew up in Etobicoke, a suburb of Toronto, Ontario. He was a student at Martingrove Collegiate Institute, where he also played as a running back in the Etobicoke Minor Football League. After graduation, he first went on to study at Trinity College London. He then returned to Canada, attending the Radio and Television Arts Program (RTA) at Ryerson Polytechnical Institute (now Toronto Metropolitan University).

During his Ryerson studies, he did television reporting for the station that eventually became Omni Television, worked for the City TV network with sportscaster Peter Gross, and worked as an assistant editor for SportsCentre with TSN.

=== Sports executive ===
After graduating from Ryerson, Pelley worked in several different positions at TSN, beginning with his assistant editor post (which he started while completing his schooling at Ryerson), eventually becoming the president of the company.

In the early 2000s, he was asked by the then-owners of the Toronto Argonauts, Howard Sokolowski and David Cynamon, to become the team president and chief executive officer of the Canadian Football League team (succeeding Dan Ferrone). He accepted the position in 2003, and was made CEO in 2004. During his time as team president, the Argonauts won the 92nd Grey Cup, their first CFL championship in seven years. Pelley left the Argonauts in 2007, and was replaced by joint team presidents Pinball Clemons and Brad Watters.

From 2007 to 2010, he was the president of Canada's Olympic broadcast media consortium for the 2010 Winter Olympics in Vancouver while employed as the executive vice president of strategic planning at the CTV Television Network.

On September 7, 2010, he became the president of Rogers Media, a subsidiary of Rogers Communications. During his tenure with Rogers, he successfully negotiated a $5.232 billion contract with the National Hockey League (on 25 February 2014) giving Rogers the Canadian broadcast rights for all NHL games (including playoffs) until 2026.

=== PGA European Tour ===
On April 17, 2015, he resigned as the president of Rogers Media to become the commissioner and chief executive officer of the PGA European Tour.

=== Maple Leaf Sports & Entertainment ===
On January 11, 2024, it was announced that he was hired as president and CEO of MLSE. Pelley began his tenure with MLSE on April 2, 2024.

== See also ==
- Rogers Media
- Toronto Argonauts
- PGA European Tour
