= Maple Leaf Sports & Entertainment =

Canadian sports and real estate company

Maple Leaf Sports & Entertainment Ltd.

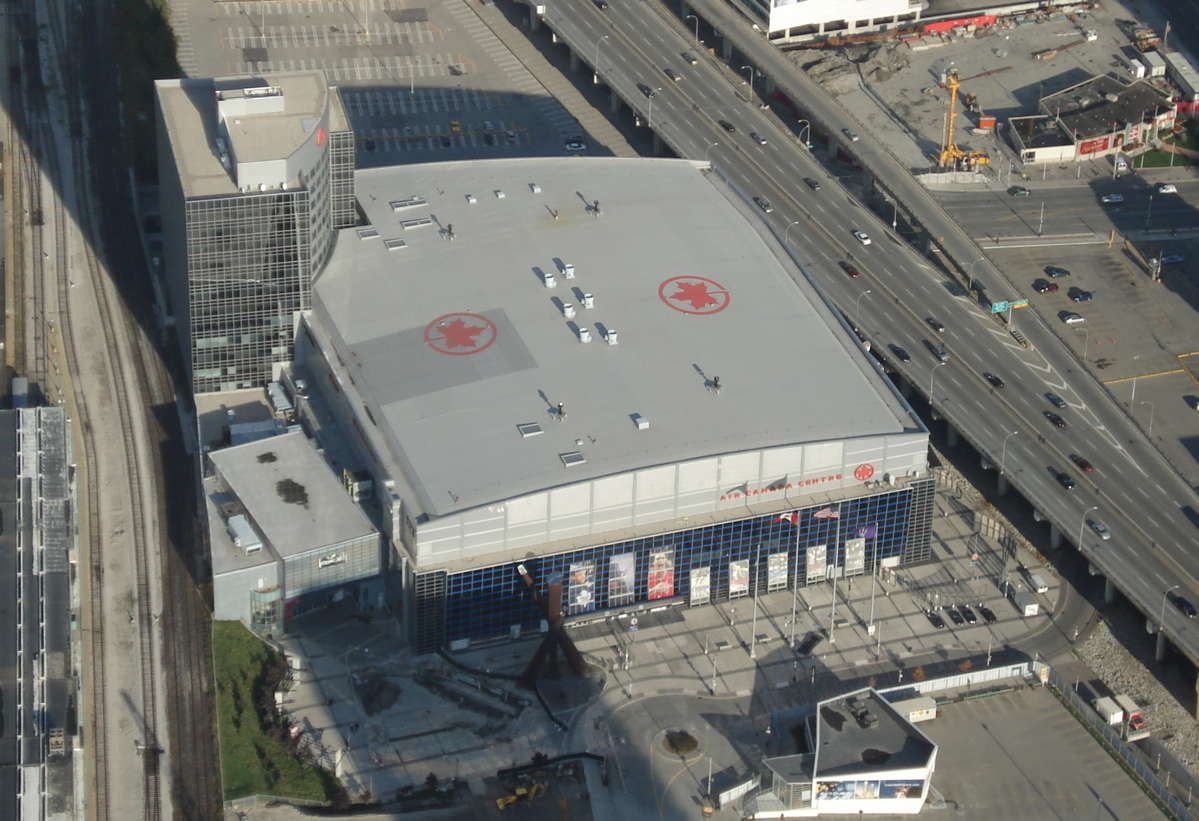
- A bird's-eye-view of MLSE headquarters next to Scotiabank Arena from the CN Tower
- Formerly: Maple Leaf Gardens Ltd. (1931–1998)
- Type: Joint venture
- Industry: Professional sports; Property management
- Founded: 1931; 95 years ago in Toronto, Ontario, Canada
- Founder: Conn Smythe
- Headquarters: Scotiabank Arena, 50 Bay Street, Toronto, Ontario, Canada
- Area served: Greater Toronto Area
- Key people: Edward Rogers (Chair of the Board); Keith Pelley (President & CEO)
- Total equity: ▲CA$17.4 billion (2026); ▲CA$12.5 billion (2024)
- Owner: Rogers Communications
- Number of employees: 3,000 (2025)
- Subsidiaries: Toronto Maple Leafs; Toronto Raptors; Toronto Argonauts; Toronto FC; Toronto Marlies; Raptors 905; Toronto FC II; Scotiabank Arena; OVO Athletic Centre; Maple Leaf Square (37.5%)
- Website: www.mlse.com

Maple Leaf Sports & Entertainment Ltd. (MLSE) is a professional sports and commercial real estate company based in Toronto, Ontario, Canada. With assets that include franchises in four of the six major professional sports leagues in the United States and Canada, it is the largest sports and entertainment company in Canada, and one of the largest in North America. Since October 2026, MLSE has been wholly owned by Canadian media and telecom company Rogers Communications.

The company's primary holdings are its sports franchises, the Toronto Maple Leafs of the National Hockey League, Toronto Raptors of the National Basketball Association, Toronto Argonauts of the Canadian Football League, and Toronto FC of Major League Soccer, as well as their minor league farm teams, the Toronto Marlies of the American Hockey League (AHL), Raptors 905 of the NBA G League, and Toronto FC II of MLS Next Pro. In addition, it owns Scotiabank Arena, home arena of the Maple Leafs and Raptors, and OVO Athletic Centre, practice facility for the Raptors. MLSE also manages or has invested in several other sports facilities including BMO Field, home of Toronto FC and the Toronto Argonauts, Coca-Cola Coliseum, home of the Marlies and Toronto Tempo of the Women's National Basketball Association, Ford Performance Centre, practice facility of the Maple Leafs and Marlies, BMO Training Ground, practice facility for Toronto FC and Toronto FC II and home of the TFC Academy, Lamport Stadium, practice facility for the Argonauts, and Mississauga Sports and Entertainment Centre, home and practice facility of Raptors 905.

MLSE was founded by Conn Smythe in 1931 as a public company named Maple Leaf Gardens Limited (MLGL), to act as a holding company for the Maple Leafs and their planned new arena Maple Leaf Gardens, from which the company got its name. Smythe transferred his ownership of the Leafs to the company in exchange for shares in MLGL, and sold shares in MLG to the public to fund construction of the arena. Following the death of majority owner Harold Ballard in 1990, Steve Stavro led a controversial bid to buy the company and take it private. In 2012, the Ontario Teachers' Pension Plan (OTPP) sold their majority share of the company to a joint venture between Rogers Communications and BCE Inc., two of Canada's largest media companies. In 2025, Rogers purchased BCE's share of the company for CA$4.7 billion, giving it majority ownership and valuing the company at CA$12.5 billion.

While initially primarily a hockey company, with ownership stakes in a number of minor and junior hockey clubs including the Toronto Marlboros of the Ontario Hockey Association, the company later branched out to own the Hamilton Tiger-Cats of the CFL from the late 1970s to late 1980s, before merging with the Raptors, which at the time was constructing the Air Canada Centre, and adopting their current name in 1998. The company launched Toronto FC in 2007, and purchased the Argonauts in January 2018.

== Corporate history ==
=== Founding ===
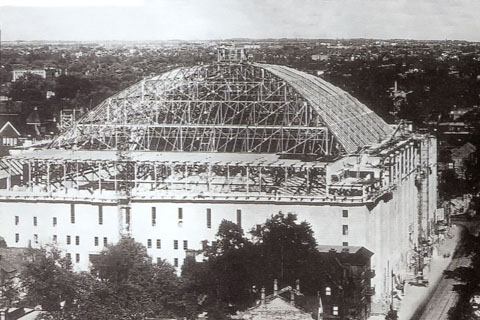
Maple Leaf Gardens roof under construction, pictured in 1931

The corporation's roots can be traced back to 1927, when Conn Smythe organized a group of investors to purchase Toronto's premier hockey franchise, the Toronto St. Patricks of the National Hockey League (NHL), which had won Stanley Cup championships in 1918 (as the Toronto Arenas) and 1922, from a group headed by Charles Querrie. The club was playing poorly and minority partner Jack Bickell contacted Smythe about becoming the team's coach. Smythe told Bickell that he was more interested in buying a stake in the team. Not long after, with the team in financial trouble due to majority owner Querrie having lost a lawsuit to former Toronto Blueshirts owner Eddie Livingstone over ownership of the franchise, Querrie put the St. Pats up for sale and agreed in principle to sell them for $200,000 to C. C. Pyle, who planned to relocate the team to Philadelphia. Bickell informed Smythe of the proposed sale, and Smythe, having persuaded Querrie that civic pride was more important than money, put together a seperarte group to purchase the team. Smythe invested $10,000 of his own money, and his group contributed $75,000 up front and a further $75,000 due 30 days later, with Bickell retaining his $40,000 share in the team. The deal was finalized on Valentine's Day, and the new owners quickly renamed the team the Toronto Maple Leafs, after the national symbol of Canada. Smythe attributed his choice of a maple Leaf logo to his experiences as a Canadian Army officer and prisoner of war during World War I. Later that year, Smythe bought the junior hockey Toronto Marlboros of the Ontario Hockey Association to serve as a developmental team for Maple Leafs.

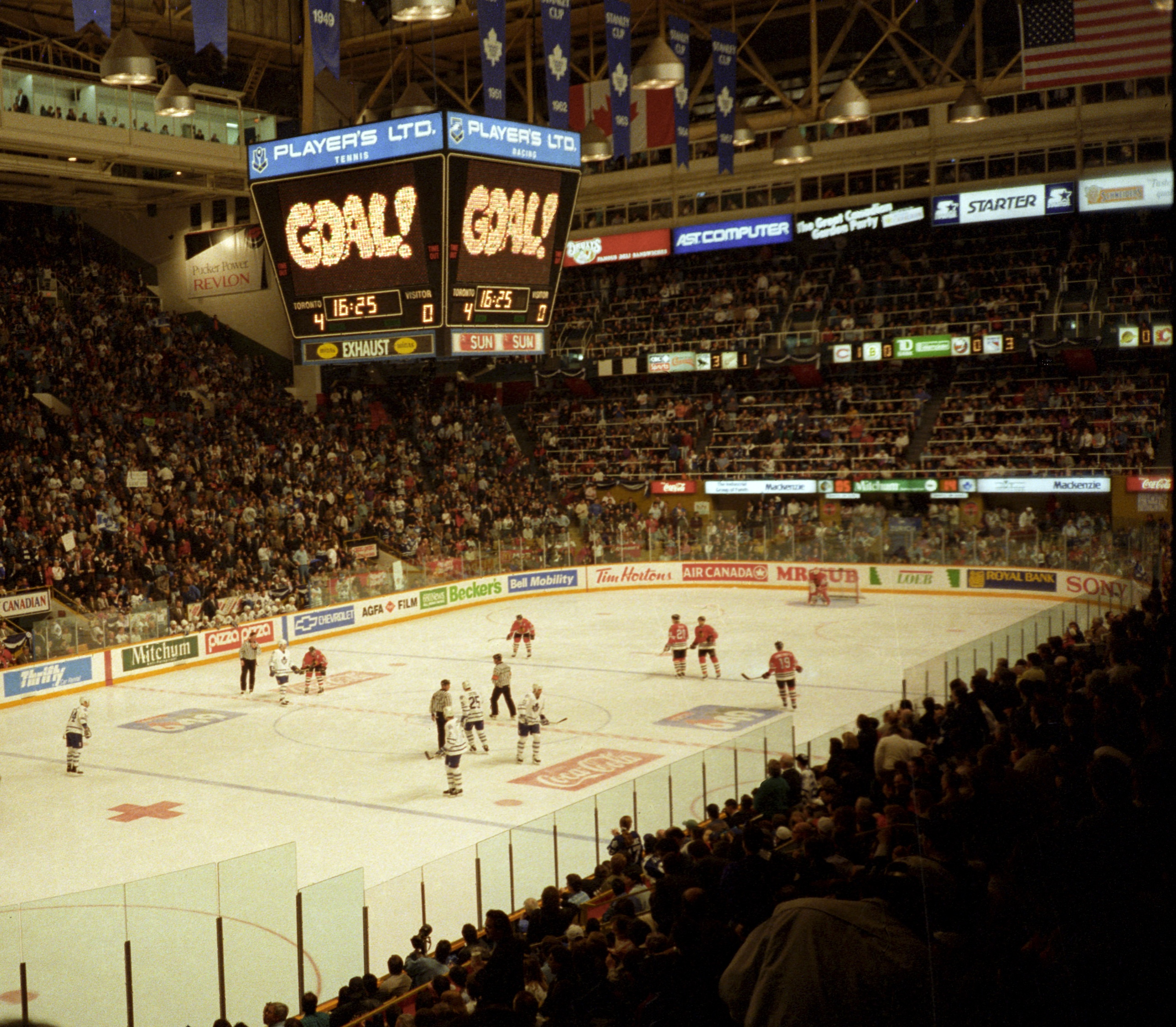
The Toronto Maple Leafs, the primary asset of MLGL for many years, play a home game at the Gardens in 1994

In 1929, in the midst of the Great Depression, Smythe decided that the Maple Leafs needed a new arena. Arena Gardens, their then home which they shared with the Marlboros, had been built in 1912 and lacked modern amenities. It seated just 8,000, which the Maple Leafs were regularly filling. After considering various locations, the site at the corner of Carlton and Church streets was purchased from The T. Eaton Co. Ltd. for $350,000, a price said to be $150,000 below market value. A new 12,473 seat (14,550 including standing room) arena, Maple Leaf Gardens (MLG), was designed by the architectural firm Ross and Macdonald. To finance construction, Smythe got backing from Sun Life for half of the expected $1 million cost. He then formed Maple Leaf Gardens Limited (MLGL) as a management company that would own both the arena and hockey team. A public offering of shares in MLGL was made at $10 each ($200.00 in 2025 dollars), with a free common share for every five preferred shares purchased. Ownership of the hockey team was transferred to MLGL in return for shares, while workers constructing the building were paid 20% of their salary in MLGL stock. Construction started on June 1, 1931, and MLG opened five months and two weeks later, on November 12, 1931, at a cost of $1.5 million ($30 million in 2025 dollars). The Marlboros also moved to the new arena. Bickell was named the first president of MLG.

To help fill dates at the new arena, Smythe acquired an expansion franchise in the professional International Lacrosse League on behalf of MLGL for the 1932 season, which was also named the Toronto Maple Leafs. A separate team named the Toronto Maple Leafs had competed in the first season of the ILL at the Arena Gardens, but was renamed the Tecumsehs with the arrival of Smythe's team. Both teams played at MLG. Smythe pulled out following the season due to financial losses, and the league did not play the following year.

=== Minor hockey expansion ===
The company owned numerous minor league hockey teams over the years, which have served as developmental farm teams for the Maple Leafs. A group backed by Smythe and Frank Selke of the Montreal Canadiens was awarded an American Hockey League (AHL) franchise for Rochester, New York in July 1956, after a local group could not come up with the US$150,000 in capital required by the league. The Leafs and Canadiens each owned 27.5% of the team, with the balance sold to Rochester interests. The team was named the Rochester Americans, and served as a joint affiliate of the Canadiens and the Maple Leafs, though the club was operated by the Canadiens. In the summer of 1959 the Maple Leafs bought out the Canadiens' ownership share of the club, due to concerns that Montreal was giving their prospects priority over those of the Leafs, giving them a 55% controlling interest. They purchased most of the remaining 45% in 1963, boosting their ownership share to 98% by November 1964. In July 1966 the Maple Leafs sold the team to a group which included their then General Manager Punch Imlach for a reported $400,000.

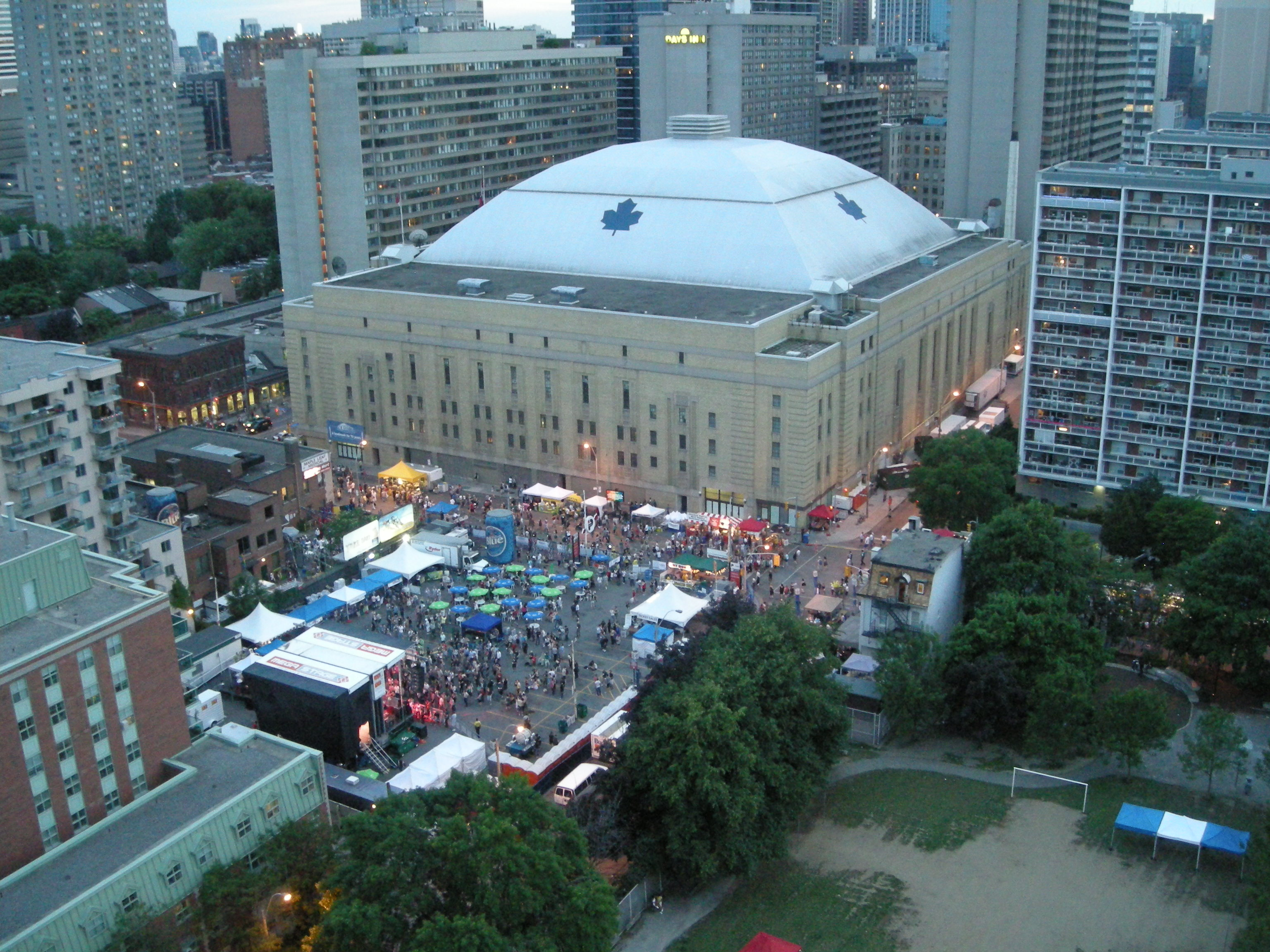
Maple Leaf Gardens, the former home of the Toronto Maple Leafs, after which MLGL was named

In June 1963 the Spokane Comets franchise of the Western Hockey League was purchased by a group led by the Maple Leafs, which relocated them to become the Denver Invaders and act as the Leafs' farm team. Though the league did not acknowledge that the Maple Leafs had an ownership stake in the team, they held a majority stake with the Denver partners only owning roughly 36%. Following reported losses of $150,000 in their first season, and failure to meet a 2,000 season ticket goal by a league-imposed deadline, Smythe announced that the team would be relocated. The team became the Victoria Maple Leafs the following season. In June 1967 MLGL sold the team to a group from Phoenix for $500,000, which relocated it to become the Phoenix Roadrunners.

In 1964 MLGL launched the Tulsa Oilers of the Central Professional Hockey League. The team was owned and operated by MLGL as a developmental club for the Maple Leafs. In the spring of 1973 it was announced that the Oilers would relocate to become the Oklahoma City Blazers. Prior to the 1976–77 season the Maple Leafs decided to share an affiliate with the Chicago Black Hawks in an attempt to reduce costs, and pulled out of the Blazers. In 1978 the New Brunswick Hawks of the AHL were established, and were jointly operated by the Chicago Black Hawks and the Toronto Maple Leafs as their farm team. MLGL and the Black Hawks each owned half of the franchise. However, by 1980 MLGL decided that the Leafs needed an affiliate of their own, with a spokesperson citing the limited number of roster spots available on a shared team. In 1981 the Cincinnati Tigers of the old Central Hockey League were established under the ownership of MLGL, but the team averaged only 1,500 fans and lost $750,000 in their first season and folded the following spring. Shortly thereafter, with Chicago having pulled out of New Brunswick in favour of affiliating with the Springfield Indians on their own, the Leafs relocated the New Brunswick Hawks to St. Catharines, Ontario to establish the St. Catharines Saints as their farm team. The team played in St. Catharines until 1986, and after stops in Newmarket, Ontario as the Newmarket Saints (1986–1991) and St. John's, Newfoundland and Labrador as the St. John's Maple Leafs (1991–2005), the team moved to Toronto as the Toronto Marlies (named after the company's former junior team) where they have played ever since.

The Toronto Marlboros served as a junior farm team for the Maple Leafs for 40 years until direct NHL sponsorship of junior clubs ended in 1967 when the NHL made the Entry Draft universal. In October 1988, with the team losing hundreds of thousands of dollars a year, MLGL reached an agreement to sell the Marlboros to a group from Hamilton for a reported $500,000, severing their ties with the Maple Leafs. However, the Leafs retained the rights to the Marlies name. The team moved to Hamilton for the 1989–90 season.

=== Growth beyond hockey ===
In 1967 MLGL entered into negotiations to purchase the financially struggling Toronto Maple Leafs baseball team of the minor AAA International League. The asking price was $60,000. The deal fell through due to concerns about the team's stadium, Maple Leaf Stadium, which needed up to $250,000 in repairs and whose owner wanted $4 million to purchase it, and the team was sold and relocated to Louisville the following season. MLGL owner Harold Ballard said that the company's interest was due in part to help position itself to pursue a Major League Baseball (MLB) franchise for Toronto. In early 1974 MLGL announced plans to build a new baseball stadium in Toronto, but the city decided to renovate Exhibition Stadium to make it suitable for baseball instead. At the time, the MLGL group, led by Lorne Duguid, vice-president of Hiram Walker Distillers and MLGL executive, was one of at least four bidding for a Toronto MLB team, including competing groups led by Labatt Brewing Company, Robert Hunter (the former President of the International League Maple Leafs), and Canadian Baseball Co (led by Sydney Cooper). MLGL held negotiations with the owners of several MLB teams, including the Baltimore Orioles, Chicago White Sox, Cleveland Indians and Oakland Athletics, in their attempt to acquire a team for Toronto, and offered $15 million to purchase the San Francisco Giants. However, the Giant's ownership decided in early 1976 to sell the club to the Labatt group for US$13.25 million. While the Giants' relocation to Toronto was ultimately rejected by a U.S. court, Labatt was awarded an American League expansion team for US$7 million later that year which became the Toronto Blue Jays.

A team named the Toronto Maple Leafs competed in the inaugural season of the National Lacrosse Association, a professional box lacrosse league, in 1968 at MLG. MLGL owners Ballard and Stafford Smythe were two of the five founding partners of the club, but financial difficulties forced MLGL to take over ownership midway through the season. The NLA suspended operations prior to the following season.

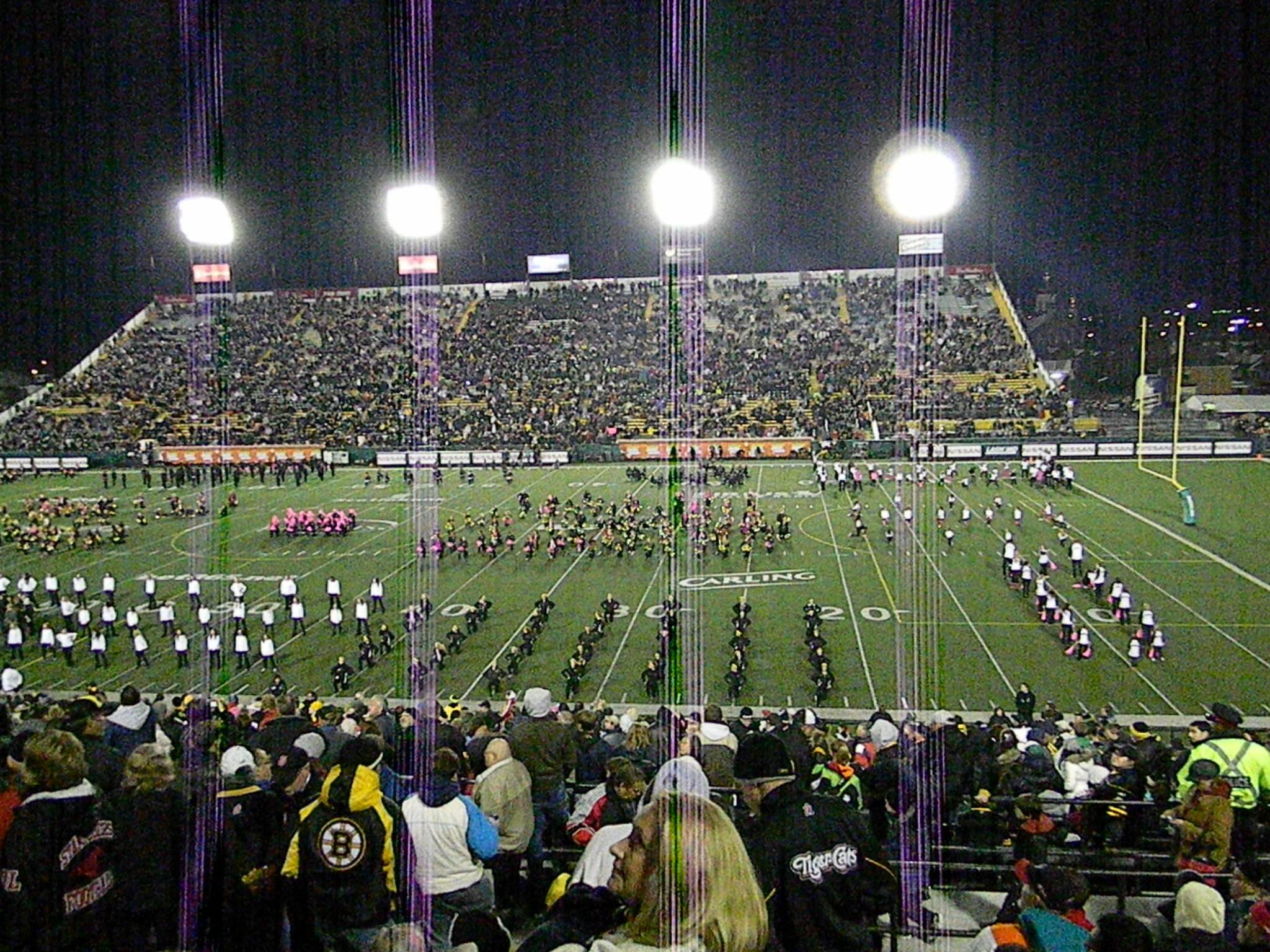
Ivor Wynne Stadium, former home of the Hamilton Tiger-Cats which MLGL owned from the late 1970s to the late 1980s

In the early 1970s MLGL announced plans to apply for a second Toronto-based Canadian Football League team, in addition to the Toronto Argonauts, which would play at Varsity Stadium, but the proposal was never realized. In 1974, when Ballard's former partner John W. H. Bassett put the Argonauts up for sale for $3.3 million, he expressed interest in buying the team, but it was ultimately sold to William R. Hodgson. Shortly thereafter, Ballard attempted to buy the Hamilton Tiger-Cats of the CFL from Michael DeGroote, but this offer was also rejected. Three money-losing seasons later, in February 1978, DeGroote sold the team to MLGL for $1.3 million. During his tenure as owner of the Tiger-Cats, Ballard repeatedly threatened to move the franchise to Toronto's Varsity Stadium, which was vetoed by the Argos, and claimed to have lost approximate $20 million over 11 seasons. MLGL sold the team to David Braley in March 1989 for $2.

Ballard partnered with Ruby Richman, the former coach of Canada men's national basketball team, to explore purchasing a number of National Basketball Association (NBA) and American Basketball Association (ABA) franchises to relocate to Toronto to play at MLG in the 1970s. Richman had tentative agreements to purchase both the Miami Floridians and Pittsburgh Condors of the ABA, with a plan to merge them into a single Toronto-based team, but the deal fell through. Later, Richman held negotiations with the Detroit Pistons, which were originally seeking $5 million for the franchise, but pulled out when the price was raised to $8.25 million. MLGL attempted to purchase and relocate the Buffalo Braves, which had played a number of regular season games at MLG over the years, to Toronto in 1974 for $8.5 million, and again several times later, but the owners eventually chose to move the team to San Diego instead. When Toronto was provisionally awarded an expansion NBA franchise in 1974 for the 1975–76 season MLGL was one of three groups to bid on the rights to the team, but the club never materialized as no group secured funding for the $6.8 million expansion fee. MLGL attempted to purchase and relocate the Houston Rockets in 1975, which were seeking $8 million for the team, but the team's arena lease ultimately prevented it from relocating. In 1976 MLGL attempted to buy the Atlanta Hawks. In 1979 a Toronto based group which included Ballard again sought an NBA expansion franchise, but lost out to the Dallas Mavericks. A Toronto group which included Bill Ballard, son of Harold, and Basketball Hall of Famer Wilt Chamberlain submitted an application and US$100,000 deposit for an NBA expansion franchise for MLG in 1986, but of the six cities to apply Toronto was not one of the four which were successful. It was not until 1993 when the NBA awarded an expansion franchise to John Bitove, over a group led by future MLSE minority owner Larry Tanenbaum which was supported MLGL, that the city would get an NBA team, which became the Toronto Raptors.

=== Merger with the Raptors and rebranding ===
In 1997 it was reported that the Maple Leafs were in negotiations to purchase the Toronto Shooting Stars of the National Professional Soccer League. The team, which played at MLG, had suspended operations following their inaugural season, during which it lost nearly $1 million and the league was forced to take over operations after three games when ownership pulled out. However, the team never returned to play. Following the inaugural season of the Hamilton, Ontario-based Ontario Raiders of the National Lacrosse League in 1998, in which they lost $250,000 playing at Copps Coliseum, owner Chris Fritz was forced to look for partners. MLSE engaged in negotiations to purchase the team and have it play at MLG. Ultimately a group which included Bill Watters, the then Assistant General Manager of the Toronto Maple Leafs, bought the team for $250,000 and moved it to MLG where they rebranded it the Toronto Rock. MLSE held negotiations with the Arena Football League in 1998 on acquiring an expansion franchise for the following season to coincide with the opening of the ACC, with the price set at US$4–7 million. The company also submitted an application for a Women's National Basketball Association franchise which was rejected by the league due to concerns about their readiness.

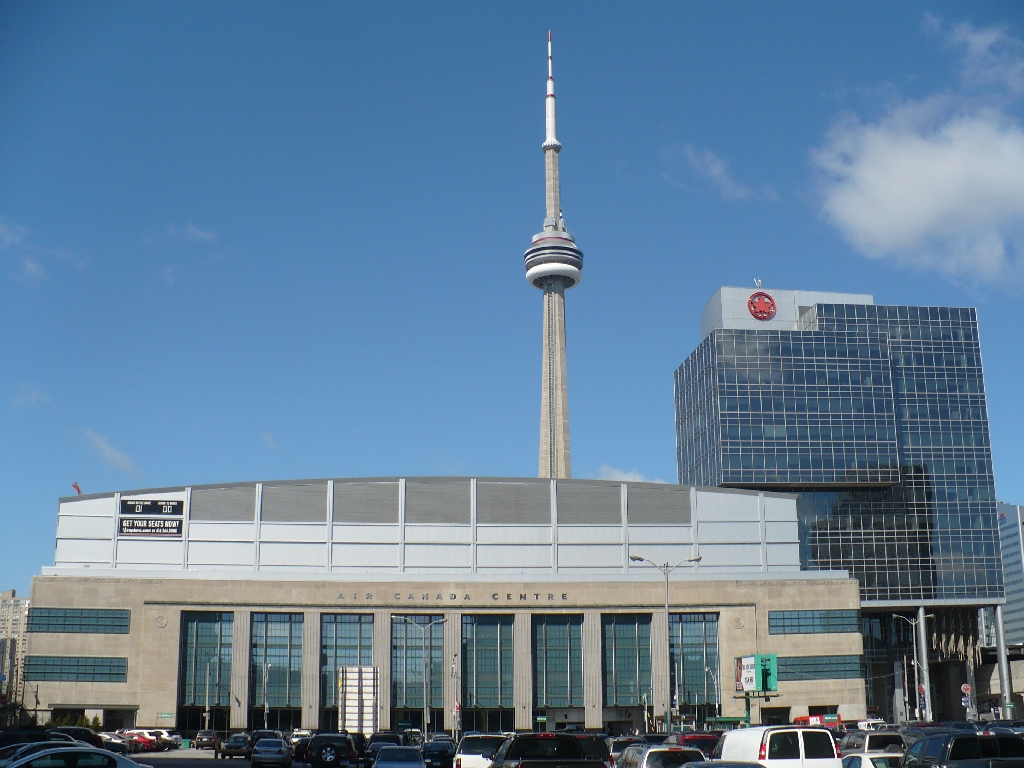
Scotiabank Arena, home to the Maple Leafs and Raptors since 1999, came under the ownership of MLGL while under construction with the merger of the two franchises

With MLG aging, MLGL began planning for a new home arena for the Maple Leafs in the 1990s. At the time the Raptors were constructing their new arena, which would be named Air Canada Centre (ACC), and they invited the Maple Leafs to become a joint tenant. MLGL rejected the offer, arguing that "the footprint is too small". After Allan Slaight took over controlling ownership of the Toronto Raptors in late 1996, talks resumed between the two groups. MLGL put forward a proposal to the city to construct a new $300 million shared arena just to the north, on top of the Union Station rail tracks, with the already under construction Raptors arena being converted into a bus terminal. However, an agreement could not reached with the City of Toronto government on rent for the land. In November 1997 MLSE submitted a new proposal for a $250 million arena at Exhibition Place. However, after years of acrimonious negotiations on February 12, 1998 MLGL announced that they had purchased 100% of the Raptors basketball club and the ACC from Allan Slaight and the Bank of Nova Scotia. MLGL paid a reported $467 million, $179 million for the team and $288 million for the arena. That July the company adopted a new name, Maple Leaf Sports & Entertainment (MLSE), to reflect its broader holdings. Richard Peddie, who had been President of the Toronto Raptors, became MLSE's president and CEO. MLSE subsequently ordered major modifications to the original design of the ACC, which was basketball-specific, to make it more suitable for hockey, increasing the cost from $217 million to $265 million. In February 1999 the ACC opened as the new home of the Maple Leafs and Raptors. MLG, which was left with no major tenants, was sold in 2004 for $12 million to Loblaw Companies, Canada's largest food retailer, which converted the ground level into a Loblaws grocery store. A condition of the sale was that it could not to be used as a sports and entertainment facility, though MLSE eventually allowed a small arena to be restored in the building to house Ryerson University's Ryerson Rams (now Toronto Metropolitan University's TMU Bold).

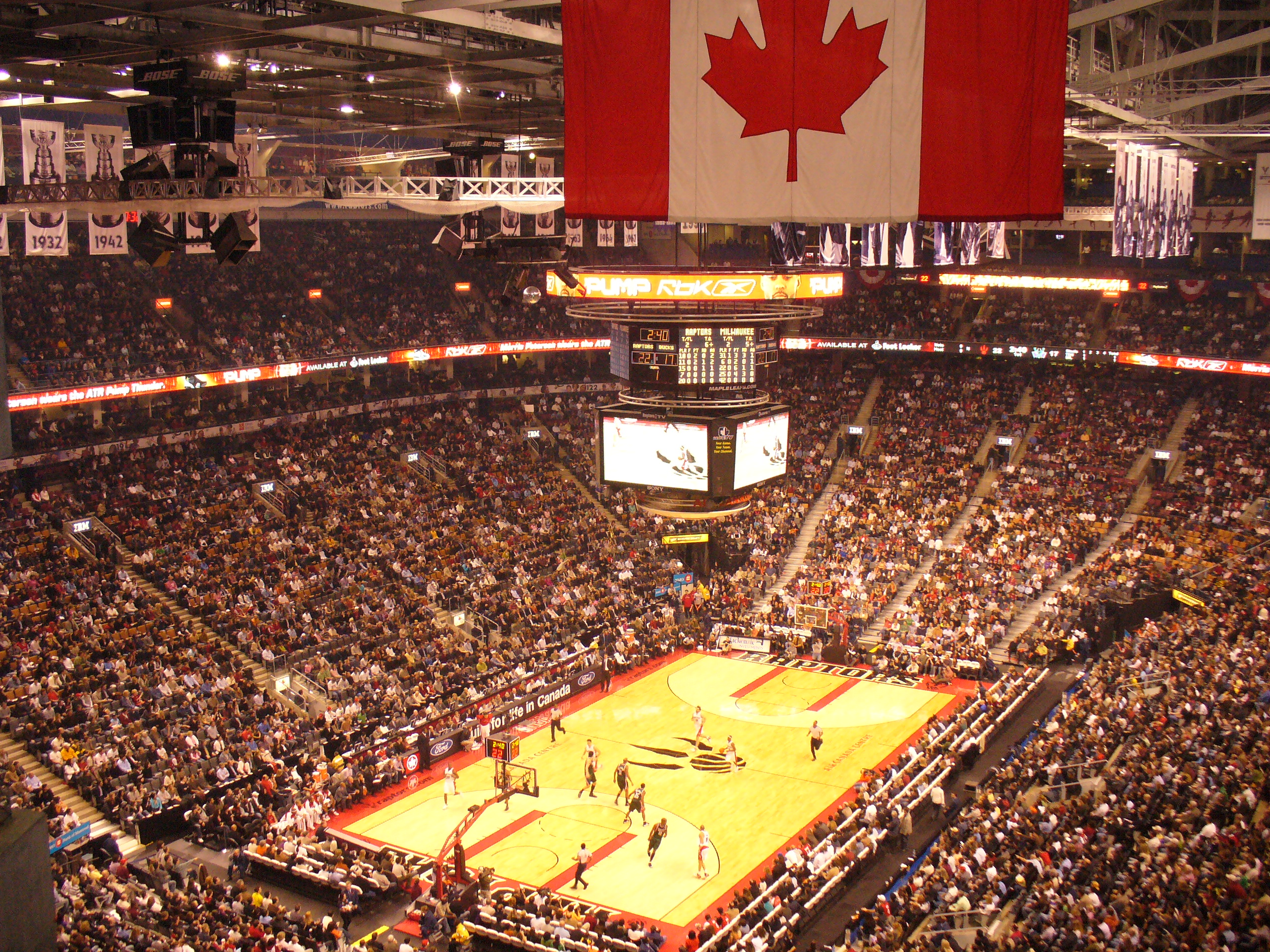
A Raptors game at Air Canada Centre in 2006 following their acquisition by MLGL

The Canadian Radio-television and Telecommunications Commission (CRTC) granted MLSE two category 2 digital specialty channel licenses in 2000 for Leafs TV (later renamed Leafs Nation Network) and Raptors NBA TV, which launched on September 7, 2001. The channels were devoted to MLSE teams, and broadcast select live games in an attempt to increase competition and broadcasting rights fees paid by other channels.

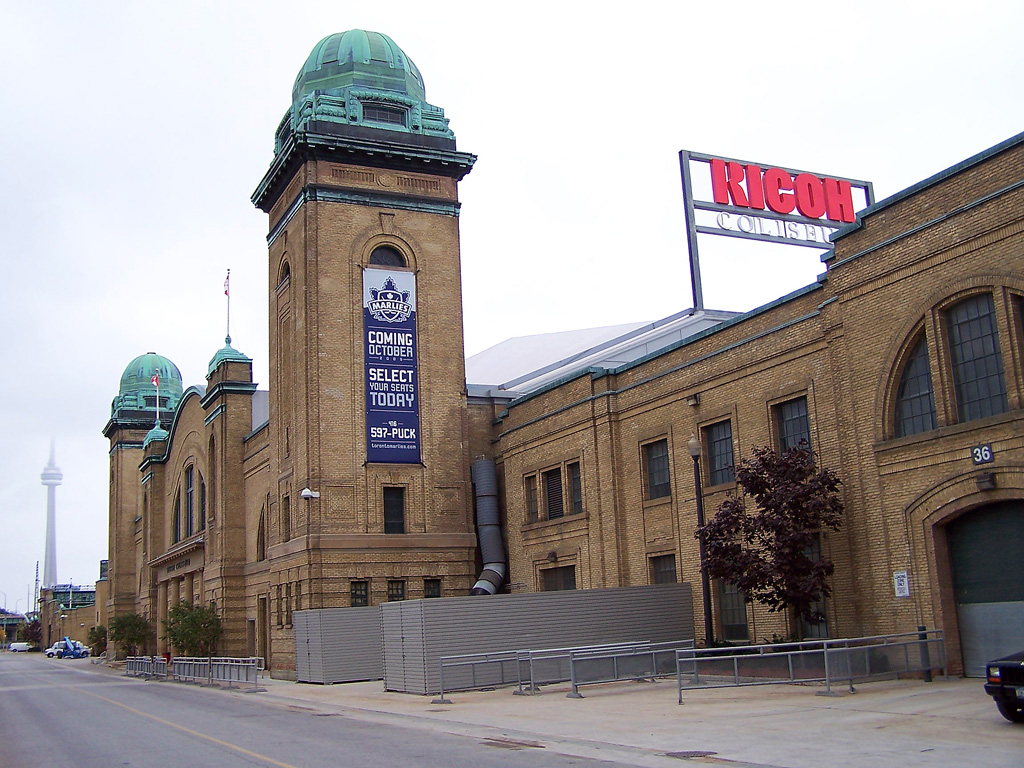
Ricoh Coliseum after being renovated in 2005 to house MLSE's Toronto Marlies

In August 2004 MLSE announced that they would relocate their AHL farm team from St. John's, Newfoundland to Toronto to play in Ricoh Coliseum (later renamed Coca-Cola Coliseum) for the 2005–06 season. The arena had been left without a hockey tenant following the termination of their lease with the Toronto Roadrunners, the AHL affiliate of the Edmonton Oilers, for defaulting on rent. MLSE agreed to a 20-year lease (with an option to extend the term by a further 10 years) with the Coliseum, which had undergone a $38 million renovation in 2003, that called for rent to cover debt financing charges, property taxes and generate a return to the arena investors, exceeding $4 million annually. In 2023 the city approved amendments to MLSE's lease of the Coliseum, including a 10-year extension starting in 2025 with an option for a further 10-year extension.

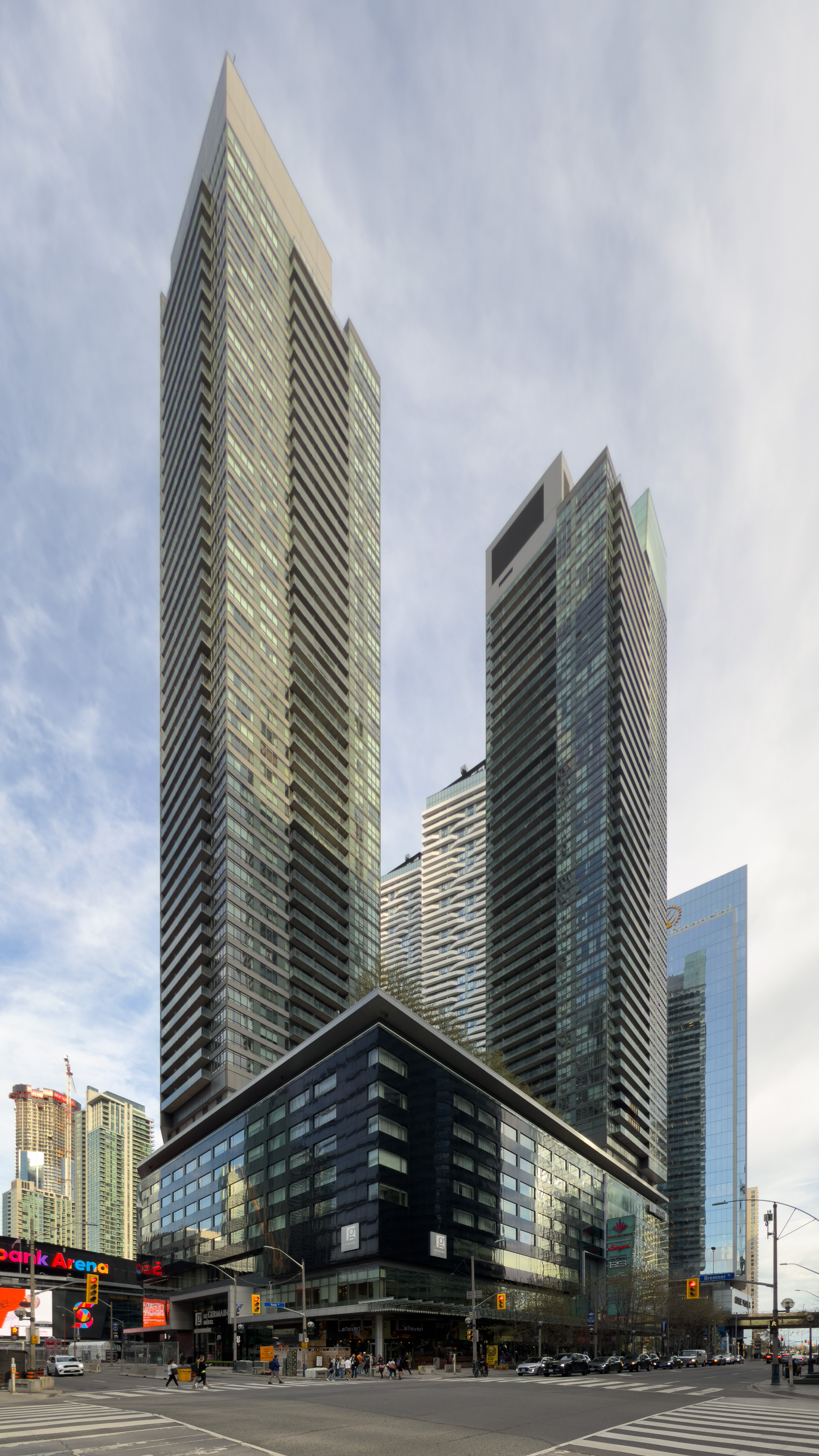
Condos at Maple Leaf Square, built by a partnership including MLSE next to Scotiabank Arena

MLSE announced in April 2005 that they would partner with Cadillac Fairview (a wholly owned subsidiary of Ontario Teachers' Pension Plan) and Lanterra Developments to build Maple Leaf Square, a major entertainment complex located next to the ACC. The $500 million 1,700,000 square feet (160,000 m^{2}) complex, which was completed in 2010, is a mixed use facility with tenants including MLSE owned Real Sports Apparel, Real Sports Bar and Grill, and e11ven restaurant, as well as Hotel St. Germain, Longo's grocery store, office space and condominium residences. In conjunction there was a two-year, $48 million renovation of the ACC to connect it with the square, which added a new atrium that includes a high-definition broadcast studio for Leafs TV, NBA TV Canada and GolTV Canada. The external wall of the atrium features a 30 by 50-foot (15 m) video screen, which often broadcasts games to spectators gathered in the plaza in front of the arena. Real Sports Apparel relocated next to Gate 1 of the ACC in 2014.

=== Further expansion ===
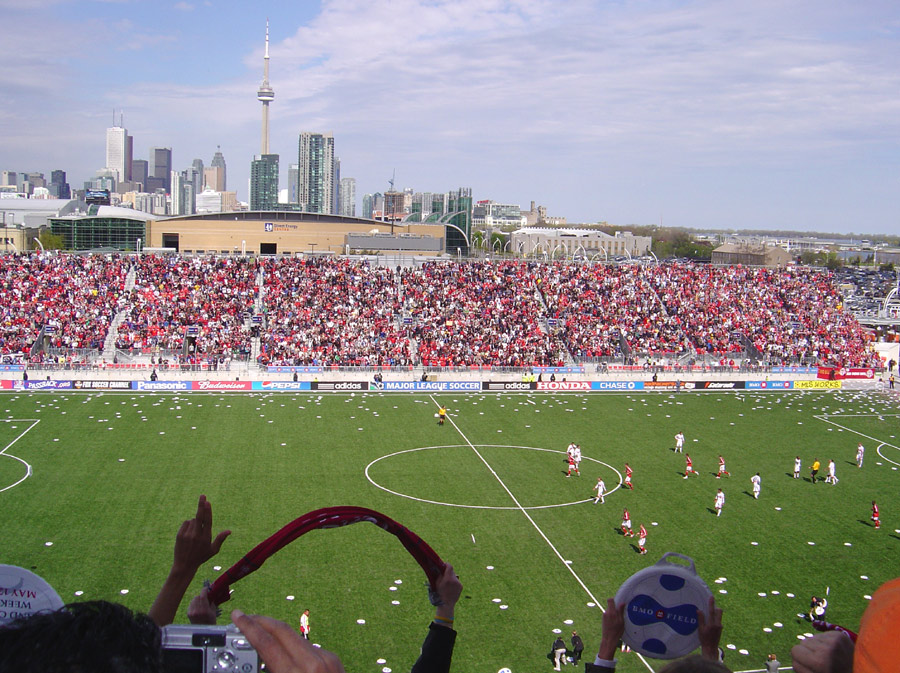
Toronto FC scores their first goal at BMO Field in 2007 following their launch by MLSE

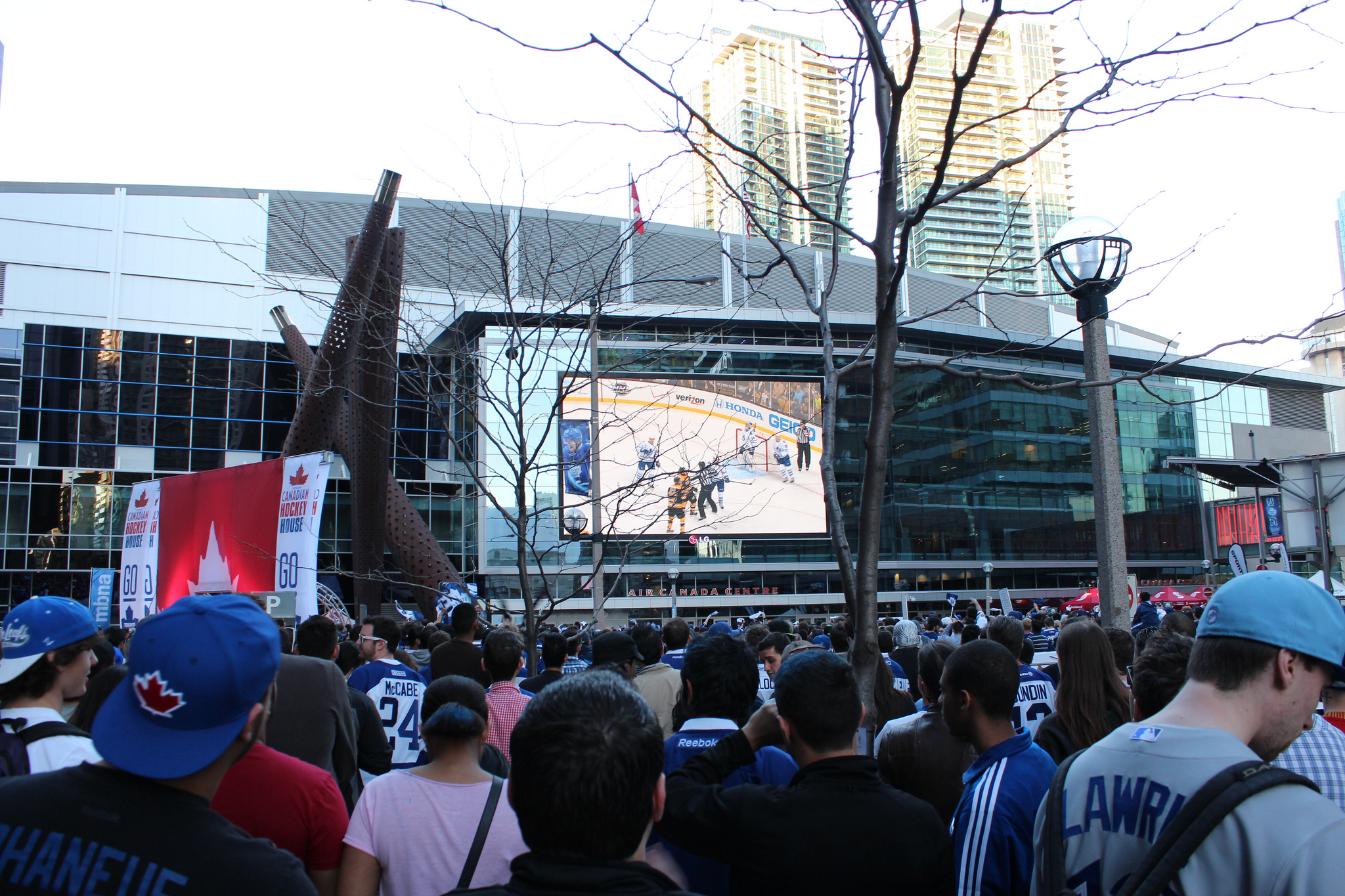
Fans watch the Toronto Maple Leafs play the Boston Bruins in the 2013 Stanley Cup playoffs at Maple Leaf Square, a plaza built by MLSE next to the Scotiabank Arena

MLSE was awarded a Major League Soccer expansion team for Toronto, which would become the Toronto FC, in 2005 for US$10 million. The company agreed to contribute $8 million towards the construction of Toronto FC's future home BMO Field, which was to cost $62.9 million total, and purchased the naming rights to the stadium for $10 million for 20 years, which they subsequently resold to the Bank of Montreal for $27 million over the first 10 years. The governments of Canada, Ontario and Toronto contributed $27 million, $8 million and $9.8 million respectively, with the City of Toronto also providing the land and MLSE agreeing to cover any cost overruns. MLSE was awarded management rights for the stadium for 20 years. Prior to the 2010 MLS season, MLSE spent $3.5 million to convert the stadium from FieldTurf to natural grass, and a further $2 million to add 1,400 seats to the north end. As part of their deal with the city to convert the field to natural grass, MLSE spent $1.2 million adding a winter bubble to Lamport Stadium and $800,000 building a new artificial turf field to replace the community use hours lost at BMO Field. The company manages the operations of Lamport Stadium during the winter season, when the field is covered by the dome and community soccer programs are held.

MLSE partnered with Rogers Communications in 2005 to bid to host a regular season National Football League game in Toronto. On January 30, 2008, it was announced that Rogers and Larry Tanenbaum, chairman of MLSE, had reached an agreement with the Buffalo Bills of the NFL to host an annual regular-season and three exhibition games over five seasons at Toronto's Rogers Centre beginning in 2008, with the games branded the Bills Toronto Series. At the time MLSE was considering bringing an NFL team to Toronto permanently and building it a new stadium, but abandoned the idea when they concluded that the project would not generate sufficient financial return to justify the significant investment required. MLSE president Tim Leiweke said on an NFL team in Toronto: "We can't own a team (per NFL rules), but we do have more expertise on how to build (stadiums) than anyone ... MLSE can play a role." It was reported that MLSE was interested in building and managing the proposed stadium, and had already begun designing it. In 2013 MLSE minority owner Tanenbaum and board member Edward Rogers III partnered with musician Jon Bon Jovi to purchase an NFL team. Following the death of Bills' owner Ralph Wilson in 2014, the group submitted an offer to purchase the franchise with speculation that they would relocate the team to Toronto once its stadium lease permitted it, but were outbid by Terrence Pegula.

Logo of MLSE following the launch of Toronto FC, which was used until 2014

MLSE explored purchasing the Argonauts of the CFL at least twice in the 2000s and 2010s, with minority partner Tanenbaum supportive of adding the team to his portfolio, but concluded that the cost and effort required to make the team profitable was not worth the minimal financial upside. In 2013 it was reported that the company was considering purchasing the team and having it play at a renovated BMO Field, with the asking price reportedly $20 million, but later coming down to $10 million. A vote by MLSE's board on purchasing the team was called in December 2013, but they were unable to come to an agreement on the issue. On May 20, 2015, it was announced that two of the three ownership partners of MLSE, Bell Canada and Tanenbaum's Kilmer Group, had reached an agreement to acquire ownership of the Argos, and that the team would move to BMO Field for the 2016 season. It was speculated that Rogers did not want to invest in the team since Bell had exclusive broadcasting rights to all CFL games. MLSE purchased the Argos from this partnership in January 2018. It was thought that control of the Argos by MLSE would enhance Toronto's chances of acquiring an NFL franchise, with Peddie saying that "the NFL is telling them that if you want an NFL team, you better make sure the Argos are okay." Leiweke said that moving the team into a renovated BMO field "will help turn [the Argos] around" and that "there's no way the NFL comes here without the CFL being unbelievably successful first." The purchase of the Argos gave MLSE ownership of four of the five major league sports teams in Toronto, with only exception being the Blue Jays whose owner (Rogers Communications) had an ownership stake in MLSE.

When the city of Oshawa, which is just east of Toronto, built a new arena, known as General Motors Centre, MLSE was chosen to manage the building. However, disappointing results in the arena's first year and a half of operations following its opening in November 2006 led MLSE to request that its contract be terminated in March 2008. The company had been attempting to get into the business of managing facilities beyond those in which their teams played, but decided to withdraw, with Bob Hunter, MLSE's Vice President of venues and entertainment, saying that managing the arena was "no longer a strategic focus for us".

=== Recent projects ===
In 2008 MLSE established the TFC Academy, a youth system to develop soccer players for Toronto FC by taking advantage of MLS's new homegrown player rule, which allows clubs to sign players they develop without being subject to the MLS SuperDraft. The senior academy team originally competed in the Canadian Soccer League until withdrawing in early 2013 due to the league losing its sanctioning from the Canadian Soccer Association. The team played that year in the Ontario Soccer League before joining League1 Ontario (L1O) for the 2014 season. In September 2018 the U20 team left L1O and switched into a U19 team that competed in the U.S. Soccer Development Academy (USSDA), along with U17 and U15 teams. After the USSDA announced in April 2020 that it was ceasing operations permanently due to financial challenges brought on by the COVID-19 pandemic, MLS announced that it was creating MLS Next as a replacement elite youth player development league, which the Toronto FC Academy would participate in.

It was announced in January 2009 that MLSE would acquire the 80.1% interest in GolTV Canada, a soccer digital cable channel, held by MLSE owner Tanenbaum through Insight Sports. The channel operated as a localized version of GOL TV USA, which owned the remaining 19.9%, with a focus on Toronto FC. In early 2015 MLSE informed the CRTC that it had acquired full ownership of the channel, however the channel ceased operations and the license was abandoned effective August 31, 2015. In November 2009 MLSE applied to the CRTC for a Category 2 digital TV license for a general interest sports service provisionally named Mainstream Sports, which was granted in June 2010. The channel, which was provisionally named "Real Sports" (similar to the branding of MLSE's sports bar and apparel store), was planned to operate as a regional sports network and broadcast MLSE's teams' games. It was never disclosed whether the channel would have replaced, or supplemented, MLSE's existing digital channels. Peddie stated that the threat of an MLSE-owned sports channel helped motivate Rogers and Bell, owners of sports channels Sportsnet and TSN respectively, to purchase the company to avoid having to pay inflated rights fees to broadcast MLSE teams' games. The acquisition of MLSE by Rogers and Bell in 2012, and agreement to divide the company's regional broadcast rights between the two, eliminated the need for the channel and its license expired after a three-year regulatory deadline for launch passed in 2013. In August 2022 it was announced that the Leafs Nation Network specicalty channel would cease operations on September 1. The channel had been valued at $19 million on behalf of the CRTC in 2012.

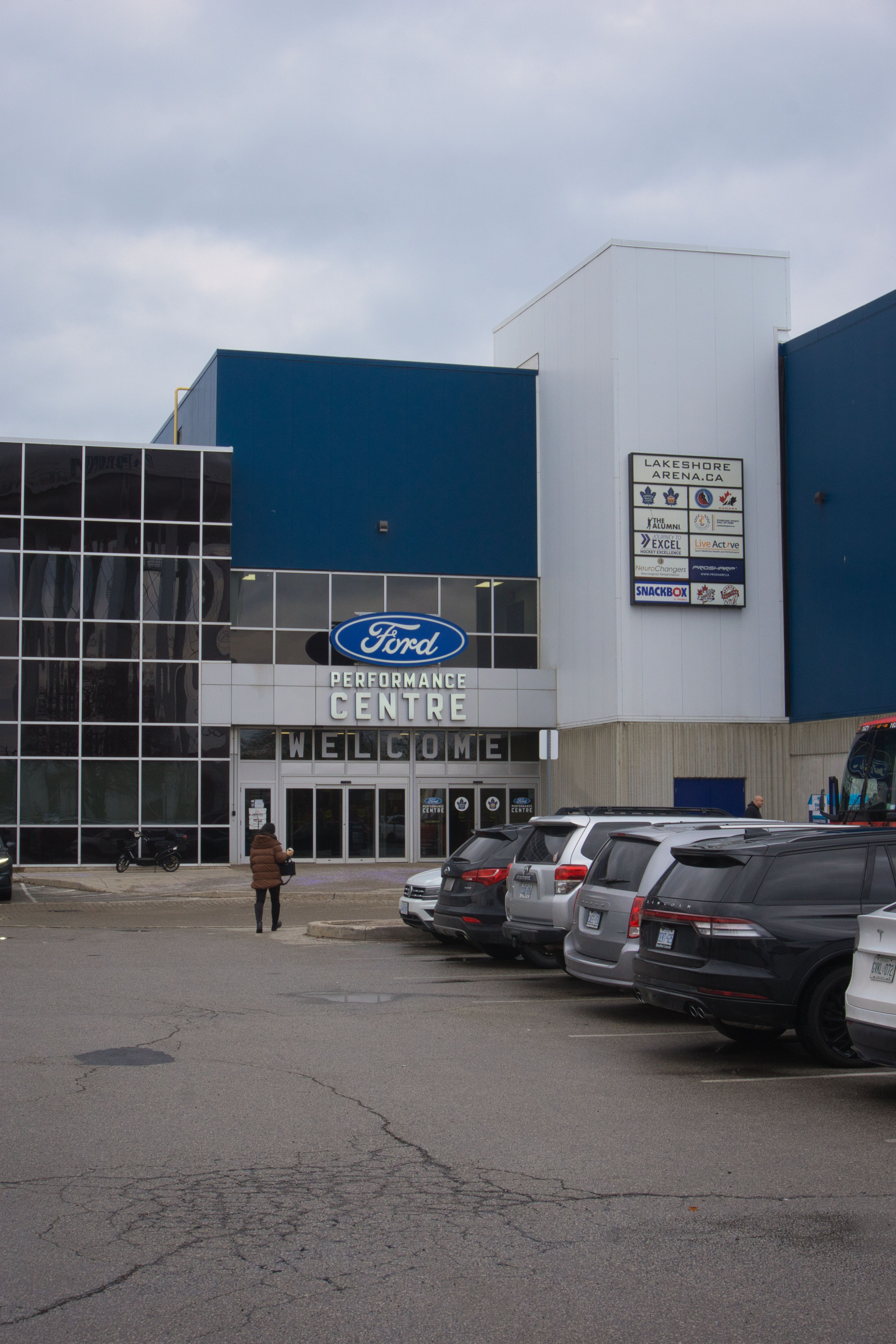
Ford Performance Centre, practice facility of the Toronto Maple Leafs and Marlies

In September 2009 the Maple Leafs and Marlies opened a new hockey practice facility, the MasterCard Centre (later renamed the Ford Performance Centre). The arena was a joint venture between MLSE, the Lakeshore Lions Club and the City of Toronto government to replace the nearby Lakeshore Lions Arena. Originally planned to cost $29 million, rising expenses resulted in the final cost being CA$44 million. The Lakeshore Lions contributed $40 million to the project, with the city providing a $35.5 million loan guarantee. The Toronto District School Board leased the land for the arena to the Lakeshore Lions for a 50-year term. MLSE pays $600,000 annually to rent the building, and receives 50% of revenues from naming rights for the facility, which were purchased by Mastercard for $525,000 a year. MLSE invested $5 million on training and medical facilities for their teams at the facility, which also hosts its Toronto Maple Leafs Hockey School. The arena was initially operated by the Lakeshore Lions Club, however in June 2011, with the arena facing financial difficulties and unable to manage its rising debt, the City of Toronto took over control. The city's intention was to return the arena to private management within 2–3 years, with a councillor suggesting that MLSE, which operated BMO Field and CNE Coliseum on behalf of the city, would be "the logical party". A spokesperson for the company said that "while we don't have any interest in purchasing the facility, we are open to discussing the possibility of managing the facility on behalf of the City". MLSE's executive vice president of venues and entertainment Bob Hunter confirmed that the company would bid to manage the building.

In January 2011 MLSE entered into a partnership agreement with concert promoter Live Nation Entertainment, under which MLSE sells sponsorships and premium tickets for events at Live Nation's venues, including the Molson Canadian Amphitheatre (now Budweiser Stage).

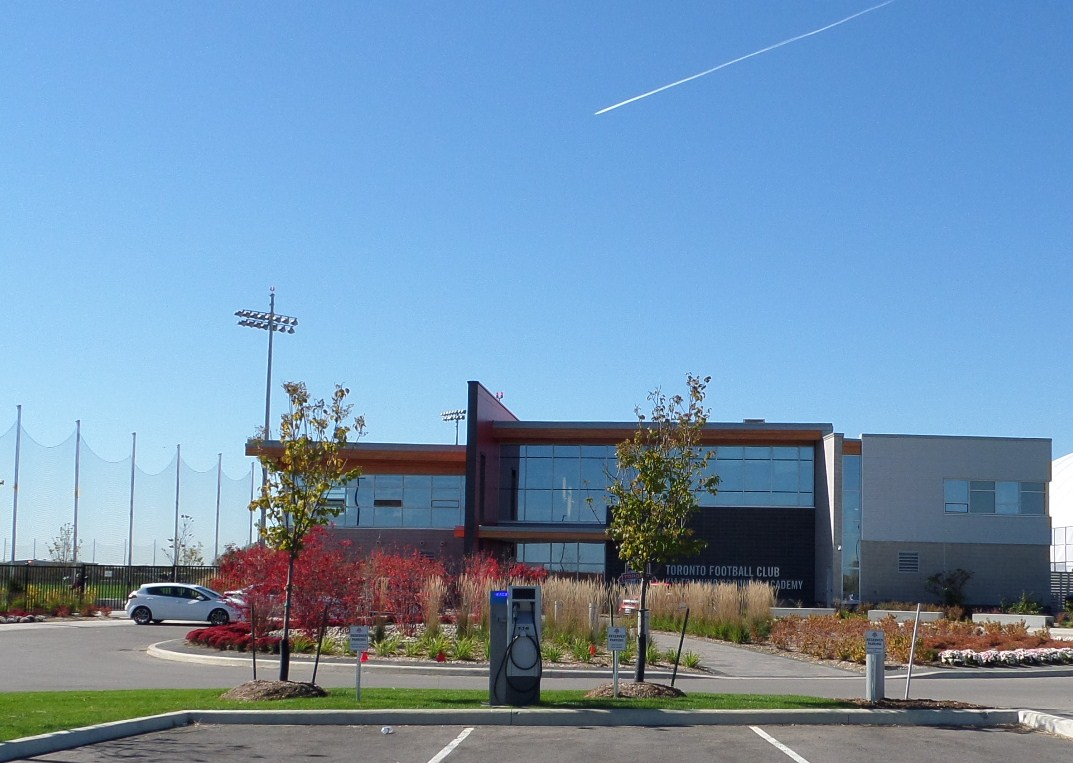
BMO Training Ground, practice facility of Toronto FC and Toronto FC II, and home to the TFC Academy

In May 2011 construction began on KIA Training Ground, Toronto FC's new academy and training facility located at Downsview Park. Opened in June 2012, it includes three grass fields, one domed turf field and a field house. MLSE invested more than $21 million building the facility, and pays rent for the land on a 20-year lease. In July 2014 it was announced that MLSE would expand the training grounds at a cost of $2 million to house a practice facility for the Argos, which would rent the facility from MLSE and practice on a nearby city owned field. The team moved in that September, but relocated their practice facility to Lamport Stadium in 2018. In 2018 the facility was renamed BMO Training Ground & Academy, after a sponsorship agreement was signed with the Bank of Montreal.

Peddie retired as president and CEO of MLSE at the end of 2011 after 14 years in the role. While the company tripled in value under his leadership, he was criticized for the long championship droughts of the company's teams. The Leafs had not won a championship since 1967, and at the time the only other major championship won under MLSE ownership was the 74th Grey Cup in 1986 by the Tiger-Cats. Tom Anselmi took over as president, but was replaced by high-profile executive Tim Leiweke who had previously run Anschutz Entertainment Group in June 2013. On August 21, 2014, Leiweke announced that he was resigning, but would remain in his position until his successor was appointed. MLSE announced on October 29, 2015, that Michael Friisdahl had been hired as the new president and CEO, and would assume his duties in December 2015. When Friisdahl announced that he was leaving MLSE in January 2022, CFO Cynthia Devine named interim President and CEO to replace him. In January 2024 it was announced that Keith Pelley had been hired as president and CEO of MLSE, effective April 2, 2024.

In November 2014 MLSE announced the establishment of Toronto FC II, a minor league professional soccer team playing in the United Soccer League (now known as the USL Championship) which would serve as TFC's reserve team and a bridge to their academy. The team began play in 2015 at a newly renovated 2,000-seat stadium constructed at the Ontario Soccer Centre in Vaughan, just north of Toronto, with plans to expand it to 5,000 by 2017. However, after the expansion, which was required to meet the United States Soccer Federation's minimum seat requirement for the USL to be sanctioned as a division 2 league, did not materialize the club moved its home games to BMO Field and Lamport Stadium for the 2018 season. On July 2, 2018, the club announced that it would join the USL League One for the league's first season in 2019. In 2022 MLS established its own minor league, MLS Next Pro, which TFC II joined and moved their home games to York Lions Stadium. On July 14, 2026, it was announced that the team would relocate to Barrie for the 2028–29 season, and play at a new stadium to be constructed in the city. MLSE will continue to own the franchise and be responsible for managing sporting related activities, while Barrie Stadium Group will manage commercial and stadium operations such as ticketing and sponsorships.

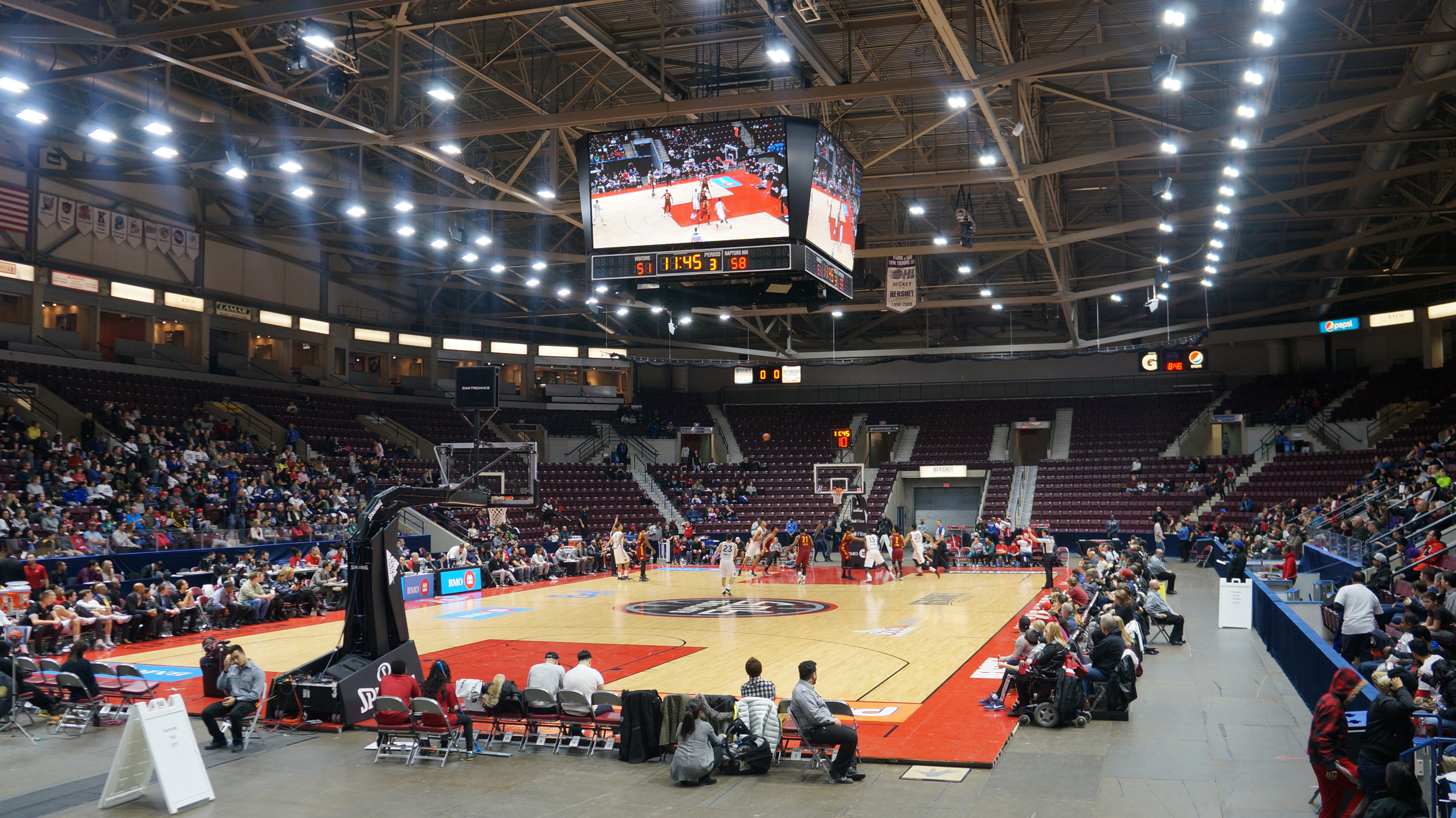
Mississauga Sports and Entertainment Centre, hosting a Raptors 905 game in 2017

In June 2015 MLSE announced that it had purchased an NBA Development League franchise to serve as a minor league farm team for the Raptors, which would be named Raptors 905 and begin play that fall at the Mississauga Sports and Entertainment Centre (then known as Hershey Centre) in Mississauga, a suburb west of Toronto. The franchise reportedly cost $6 million. Hamilton's Copps Coliseum and Oshawa were reportedly considered to host the team, as was Rochester, New York, which is just across the United States border, due to the tax and visa complications posed by a Canadian-based franchise. In 2024 MLSE partnered with the city of Mississauga to build a new practice facility for the Raptors 905 next to the arena, with MLSE agreeing to contribute up to $5.8 million of the $12.8 million cost. Construction started in June 2024, and the facility opened in March 2026.

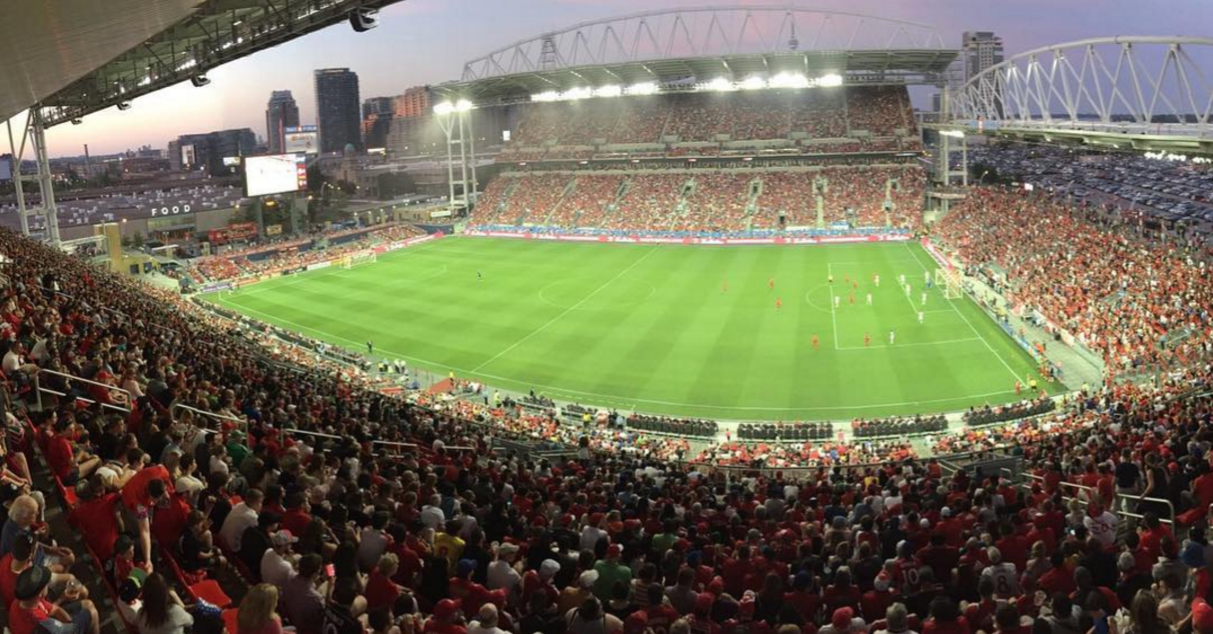
BMO Field, hosting a TFC game after completion of major renovations in 2016

The financial success of Toronto FC led MLSE to undertake a major renovation of BMO Field. Under a two phase process, the stadium's capacity was increased from 21,566 to 30,000 by May 2015, and a canopy roof covering most permanent seating areas was added and the pitch lengthened to fit a Canadian football field by May 2016. The renovated stadium can be temporarily expanded to a capacity of roughly 40,000 for big events. The renovations were originally budgeted to cost $120 million, but the final amount spent was $150 million. In exchange for a $10 million contribution to the project by the City of Toronto, which owns the stadium, they receive rent from MLSE, while MLSE's management and naming rights agreements for the stadium, which were to expire in 2027, were extended by 10 years. The province of Ontario also contributed $10 million to the financing. The City insisted that the renovations accommodate the CFL, as the Argonauts had to vacate the Rogers Centre by the end of the 2017 season. The sale of the Argos to an ownership group consisting of MLSE owners Bell and Tanenbaum in May 2015 was accompanied by an announcement that an agreement had been reached with MLSE for the team to relocate to BMO Field for the 2016 season. The Argos contributed $10 million to the conversion costs to make the field CFL compatible, which was matched by MLSE. MLSE financed the rest of the project, and was responsible for cost overruns. The Argos purchase agreement called for two Grey Cups to be played at BMO Field, the first being in 2016.

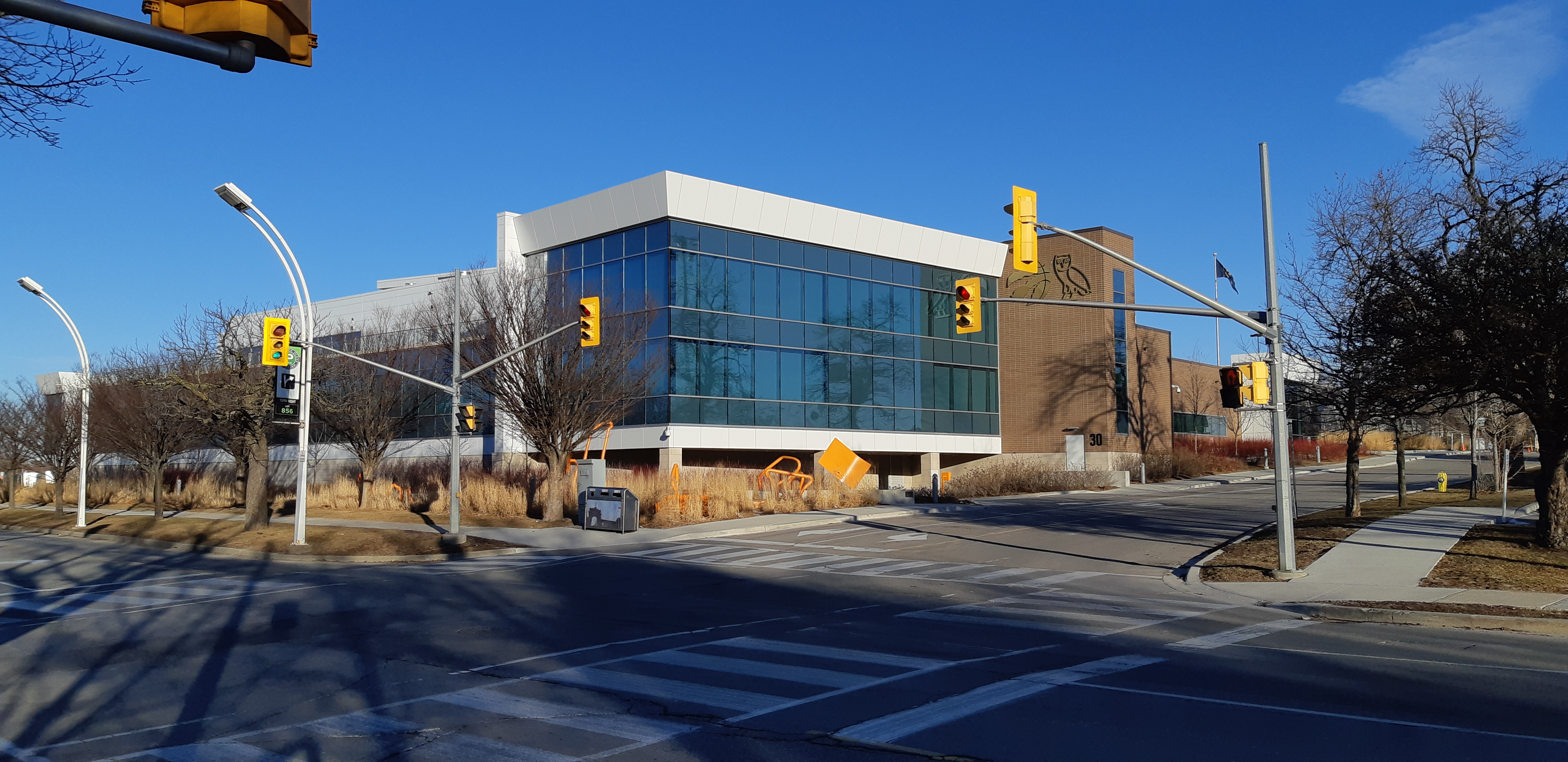
OVO Athletic Centre, the Raptors practice facility, in 2019

In February 2026, MLSE opened Biosteel Centre, a new practice facility for the Raptors at Exhibition place. The facility was constructed based on an agreement with the City of Toronto, with MLSE paying the $30 million construction cost and leasing the property from the city for $205,000 annually, subject to reassessments for inflation. The term of the lease is 20-years, with two options to extend it by a further 10 years, after which the city will take ownership of the building. In March 2019, the Raptors reached a naming rights agreement with OVO to rebrand the facility OVO Athletic Centre.

In February 2015, MLSE announced that they planned to launch a professional boxing series, featuring 3-4 major fights a year co-promoted with Groupe Yvon Michel. Originally scheduled to start with a World Boxing Council (WBC) light heavyweight title fight in April at Ricoh Coliseum, this was delayed due to regulatory restrictions on the amount of gauze that can be used for wrist wraps in Ontario. MLSE and Michel joined with Lennox Lewis to promote a WBC light-heavyweight title fight in September 2015 at Ricoh Coliseum. On November 12, 2025, MLSE announced a "long-term strategic partnership" with World Wrestling Entertainment, including cross-promotion of WWE talent with players from MLSE-owned franchises.

In August 2017 MLSE announced that it had reached an agreement with Scotiabank to rename the ACC Scotiabank Arena, effective July 1, 2018, for a reported CAD $800 million over 20 years, which would make it the largest such deal in North American sports history.

MLSE considered purchasing the Toronto Blue Jays of MLB and Sportsnet from Rogers Communications, but concerns about the viability of the Rogers Centre as a baseball venue and the profitability of the team led the company to decide against pursuing either. The company also considered investing in an English soccer club, and in May 2012, after the Leeds United Supporters Trust put out a request for a takeover of the Football League Championship team from majority shareholder Ken Bates, it was reported that MLSE were in negotiations to buy the club. However, the company later denied that it planned to purchase the club. In 2015 reports emerged that MLSE was investigating taking over the bankrupt Parma F.C. of Italy's Serie A. In May 2022, Tanenbaum indicated that MLSE was exploring investing in professional women's sports teams in hockey, basketball, and soccer for Toronto. Although the company considered applying for a Toronto-based Women's National Basketball Association expansion franchise, they eventually decided against it. Instead, Tanenbaum's Kilmer Sports Ventures submitted an application for a WNBA expansion team for Toronto, which was approved by the league in May 2024.

In September 2025, MLSE announced that they had entered into a partnership with the Buffalo Bills of the National Football League to promote the growth of football in Canada and market Bills merchandise at their Real Sports Apparel store. Team COO Pete Guelli and MLSE president Keith Pelley did not rule out the possibility of Toronto again hosting Bills games, but Guelli stated that the Bills' focus in the short term was on opening their new stadium, New Highmark Stadium.

== Ownership ==
=== Conn Smythe ===
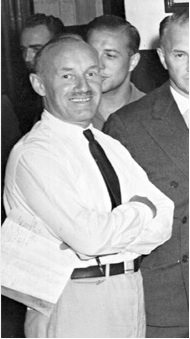
Conn Smythe, founder of Maple Leaf Sports & Entertainment

Although Conn Smythe was the face of MLGL from its founding in 1931, he did not acquire majority ownership of the company until 1947, following a power struggle between directors who supported him as president and those who wanted him replaced by Frank J. Selke. Financed by a $300,000 loan from Toronto stockbroker and MLGL shareholder Percy Gardiner, and the support of minority partner Jack Bickell, Smythe bought 30,000 shares in MLGL from Gardiner and installed himself as president on November 19, 1947, replacing Edward Bickle. The loan was paid off in 1960.

In November 1961, Smythe sold 45,000 of his 50,000 shares to a three-person partnership formed by his son Stafford Smythe, Harold Ballard, and John Bassett (owner of the Toronto Telegram and part-owner of the Canadian Football League's Toronto Argonauts) for $2.3 million. When combined with their own holdings, this gave the partnership 87,000 shares, representing 60% of the company. Ballard fronted Stafford most of the money for the purchase though a loan he obtained. According to sources, Conn thought the sale was only to his son, and was furious when he learned that Ballard and Bassett were Stafford's partners as he had hoped that Stafford would keep MLGL for his son, Tommy. However, it is unlikely that Stafford could have raised the millions needed for the deal independently. Stafford became president of MLGL and governor of the Maple Leafs, while Ballard becoming executive vice president and Bassett chairman of the board.

=== Harold Ballard, John Bassett, and Stafford Smythe ===
In March 1966, Conn sold his remaining MLGL shares and resigned from the board of directors after a Muhammad Ali boxing match was scheduled for MLG. He found Ali's refusal to serve in the U.S. Army during the Vietnam War to be offensive, and said that by accepting the fight MLGL owners had "put cash ahead of class." Within three years under the new ownership, profits had tripled to just under $1 million. Ballard negotiated lucrative deals to place advertising throughout the building, and significantly increased the number of seats in the arena.

Following a Royal Canadian Mounted Police raid at MLG in 1968, Stafford was charged with income tax evasion, and he and Ballard were accused of illegally taking money from MLGL to pay for personal expenses including home renovations. Just before the charges were laid, Bassett argued to the board of directors that Stafford and Ballard should be removed from their posts. On June 26, 1969, following an 8–7 vote of the board, Stafford and Ballard were both fired and Bassett was appointed president of MLGL. However, Bassett did not force Stafford and Ballard to sell their shares, and both men remained on the board. This proved to be a serious strategic blunder. Stafford was the largest single shareholder in MLGL, and he and Ballard controlled almost half the company's stock between them. They were thus able to regain control of the board in 1970, and Stafford was reappointed president. Facing an untenable situation, Bassett sold the 196,200 MLGL shares he controlled to Stafford and Ballard in September 1971 for $5.4 million, which he used to buy out his partners in the Argonauts. Combined with their 306,295 jointly controlled shares, the transaction gave the Stafford-Ballard partnership 78% of the stock.

Stafford died in October 1971 of a bleeding ulcer at only 50 years of age, just before his trial was scheduled to begin. Under the terms of his will, of which Ballard was an executor, each partner was allowed to buy the other's shares upon their death. Stafford's brother and son tried to keep the shares within the family, but in February 1972 Ballard bought all 251,545 of Stafford's shares for $7.5 million, valuing the company at $22 million. Stafford's brother Hugh also sold his shares to Ballard, ending the Smythe family's 45-year involvement in the company. Combined with Ballard's 262,162 shares, this gave him majority ownership of about 70%. Six months later, Ballard was convicted of 47 charges, including fraud and theft of money and goods, and sentenced to three years in a federal penitentiary.

=== Harold Ballard ===
In 1966, Ballard set up a family holding company named Harold E. Ballard Ltd. (HEBL) for his assets, including his shares in MLGL, as part of an estate freeze. Ballard distributed 103 common shares in HEBL, with his three children (Bill, Harold Jr., and Mary Elizabeth) each receiving 34 which were held in trust, and his wife Dorothy receiving 1, which Harold would inherit upon her death three years later. Harold retained 308,000 preferred shares in HEBL. While the equity of the company was vested in the common stock, both common and preferred shares each received a single vote, ensuring that Harold retained control of the company.

After getting into financial difficulty, in November 1980 Ballard reached an agreement with Molson Brewery (who at the time owned the Montreal Canadiens of the NHL) for the company to cover his debt financing charges on a loan of $8.8 million for 10 years in exchange for an option to purchase a 19.9% block of shares in MLGL from HEBL and a right of first refusal on the rest of HEBL's shares. The NHL did not learn of the deal until the late 1980s. In 1982, Ballard offered to sell the company for $50 million, with the arena alone reportedly valued at $11 million, though a stockholders' report the following year placed the value of MLGL at $23.5 million. Harold transferred ownership of his personal real estate holdings, which were valued at $2.52 million, to HEBL in January 1989, in exchange for 4 newly issued common shares in the company and a promise of a further $896,472 rather than cash. Mary Elizabeth sold her stake in HEBL to her father for $15.5 million in January 1989, after originally having a deal to sell the stake to Don Giffin, while Harold Jr. sold his back to HEBL for $21 million in June of the same year. Harold secured a loan from Molson for the full amount of his buyout of Mary Elizabeth, using the 34 acquired shares in HEBL as security. Harold Jr.'s shares were subsequently retired. Bill sued his father for $170 million over HEBL's acquisition of Harold Jr.'s stake, claiming that he and partner Michael Cohl had acquired a right of first refusal to purchase the shares for $20 million that February. Shortly thereafter, HEBL issued Harold 32 common shares and $125,216 in exchange for ownership of his 350,200 personally held MLGL shares and $125,000. Two more new common shares would be granted to Harold to repay the $911,000 debt HEBL owed him from his two transactions with the company. This gave Harold, who feared that Bill was positioning himself to take over the holding company, control of HEBL. Harold did not want his bickering children to inherit MLGL because he feared they would destroy it.

Though Ballard ran up significant amounts of personal debt during his ownership of MLGL, he made the company very profitable, so much so that MLG became known as the "Cashbox on Carlton Street", referring to the address of the arena. Upon Harold's death on April 11, 1990, most of his estate, which was worth less than $50 million, was left to charitable organizations. The executors of Harold's will were supermarket tycoon Steve Stavro, Giffin, and Donald Crump. In November 1990 Molson exercised their option on 19.9% of the company, paying $10,000 for 735,575 of HEBL's MLGL shares, which at the time were valued at $20 million. Due to restrictions against cross-ownership in the NHL, the company set up a trust to hold their stake, and the league instructed them to sell the shares within an "adequate amount of time." Shortly after Ballard's estate, which had limited income due to HEBL still owing Toronto-Dominion Bank $15.8 million on its loan to acquire Harold Jr's HEBL stock, missed a January 1991 deadline to repay its $20 million loan (including interest) from Molson, Stavro personally loaned the estate the funds to pay off the debt, and in exchange, he received an option to purchase the estate's HEBL shares before January 1996. Bill challenged the transaction, but it was approved by the court. In early 1991, Molson offered to buy the estate's shares for $40 each. In September 1991, Bill sold his HEBL stock to his father's estate for $21 million, giving it ownership of the entire company. Shortly thereafter it was announced that Stavro had reached a deal with Molson on an option to purchase their MLGL shares until April 1994 and for Molson to waive their option on the estate's shares.

=== Steve Stavro ===
Ownership structure prior to privatization in 1998

MLGL
Outstanding public stock	MLGV
MLGH; 51%	OTPP; 49%
TD Bank; 20%	Steve Stavro; 55%	Kilmer Sports; 25%
Larry Tanenbaum; 100%

Stavro founded MLG Ventures (MLGV) in March 1994 with partners Toronto-Dominion Bank and Ontario Teachers' Pension Plan. MLG Holdings Ltd. (MLGH), of which Stavro owned 80% and TD Bank controlled the remaining 20%, held a 51% ownership stake in MLGV, with the remaining 49% owned by Teachers'. The following month MLGV announced that they had reached an agreement to purchase the 60.3% of MLGL held by Harold's estate for $34 a share or $75 million total, valuing the company at $125 million. The estate still owed Stavro $23 million at the time. Molson also sold its 19.9% of MLGL to MLGV in April 1994 for $25 million. Larry Tanenbaum's company Kilmer Sports purchased a 25% share of MLGH from Stavro in 1996 for a reported $21 million.

MLGV subsequently purchased all remaining outstanding shares and took MLGL private in 1998, after acquiring more than the 90% of stock necessary to force objecting shareholders to sell, and MLGL and MLGV amalgamated. The purchase was reviewed by the Ontario Securities Commission (OSC), due to allegations that MLGV had engaged in insider trading by failing to disclose that broadcast revenue was projected to increase substantially, and a $50 million lawsuit from Bill Ballard, who claimed that Stavro and others had devalued MLGL and withheld information relevant to the value of the company prior to the sale of his stock. Ontario's Office of the Public Trustee, which represented the charities named by Harold's will as beneficiaries, argued that Stavro had a conflict of interest as both executor of the will and buyer and had not paid market value as there was no public bidding process for the shares. Several minority owners, including Harry Ornest, who held 3.5% of the company, and Jim Devellano also objected to MLGV's attempts to take the company private without an auction. Stavro and his partners in MLGV reached a settlement in 1996 to pay an additional $23.5 million plus interest to the charities, and $2.5 million to the minority shareholders who had sued, clearing the way for them to become the majority owner of MLGL. They also settled with the OSC in 1999 for $1.6 million, which included a fine and costs. Teachers' invested $44.3 million and TD $9.75 million in the deal.

Following the merger, the ownership structure of the now defunct MLGV was retained by MLGL. MLGH was the majority owner of MLGL, holding 51% of the company. It in turn was controlled by Stavro (55%), with minority shareholders Tanenbaum (25%) and TD Capital Group (20%). The remaining 49% of MLGL was owned by Teachers'. This tiered ownership structure gave Stavro effective control of MLGL with only a net 29% stake of the company. Teachers' invested a further $50 million in the company in the form of a convertible bond in 1998 to finance the purchase of the Raptors and ACC and complete construction of the arena.

=== Ontario Teachers' Pension Plan ===
In 2003 an agreement was reached to restructure the company with Stavro selling his stake to Bell Globemedia for a reported $120–150-million after debt repayments, the other partners converting their debts into equity, and each partner getting a direct ownership stake in the newly renamed MLSE, with MLGH being dissolved. This left Teachers' as the controlling majority owners of MLSE with 58.4%, and minority partners Bell Globemedia (15.4%), TD Capital with (13.5%) and Tanenbaum, who took over as non-executive chairman, with 13%. Each owner of MLSE had a right of first refusal on any shares sold, in proportion to their ownership share. The same year MLSE was valued at over $1 billion by Teachers' in its annual report. In 2008 the Toronto Star reported that a valuation commissioned by the company concluded that the company was worth US$1.5 billion. On December 5, 2008, CTVglobemedia (the renamed Bell Globemedia) sold half of its 15.4% stake to Tanenbaum for $100 million, making Tanenbaum the second-largest stakeholder with 20.7%. The transaction valued the company at $1.2 billion. On August 20, 2009, Teachers' announced that it had agreed to purchase CTVglobemedia's remaining 7.7% stake in MLSE, increasing its holdings to 66%.

=== Bell and Rogers ===
In December 2010 it was reported that Rogers Communications, owner of the Toronto Blue Jays, was in negotiations to purchase the Teachers' 66% stake in MLSE, with an asking price of $1.3 billion, and in March 2011 Teachers' confirmed that their share in the company was up for sale. Tanenbaum's right of first refusal on the shares gave him control over any sale by Teachers'. In May 2011 Teachers' announced that they had reached an agreement to purchase TD Capital's 13.5% ownership share, giving them 79.5% of the company and leaving Tanenbaum as the only minority partner with 20.5%, simplifying a sale of their shares.

In November 2011 Teachers' announced that they were taking the company off the market. However, a couple of weeks later, on December 9, 2011, the sale of Teachers' entire stake in MLSE to a partnership between BCE Inc. and Rogers Communications was announced in a deal valued at $1.32 billion, giving the company an equity value of $1.66 billion and an enterprise value of $2 billion due to the assumption of their share of MLSE's $372 million in debt and $66 million in leases. As part of the deal, Tanenbaum increased his stake in the company by 5%, valued at $109 million, to 25% to secure his approval.

The deal required the approval of Canada's Competition Bureau, the Canadian Radio-television and Telecommunications Commission (with regards to MLSE's TV channels), as well as the NHL, the AHL, the NBA, and MLS (with regards to MLSE's sports franchises). The Competition Bureau announced in May 2012 that it would not challenge the transaction, but that it will "actively review" the situation due to "serious concerns" expressed by various parties, reserving the right to take action at a later date. The NHL Board of Governors approved the sale on June 19, 2012. The final approval, that of the CRTC, was granted on August 16, with the commission noting that it only had jurisdiction over the TV channels owned by MLSE (the transfer of ownership from MLSE to Bell, Rogers and Kilmer directly, it decided, posed no major concerns), and not the broadcast rights associated with MLSE's teams. The transaction officially closed on August 22, 2012.

Two numbered companies were created to jointly hold stock. Following the restructuring, the ownership hierarchy of MLSE was:

- 8047286 Canada Inc. (Rogers/Bell joint holding company) – 75%
  - Rogers Communications – 50% (net ownership 37.5%)
  - 7680147 Canada Inc. (Bell holding company) – 50%
    - BCE Inc. – 74.67% (net ownership 28%)
    - BCE Master Trust Fund (investment fund of Bell's pension plan) – 25.33% (net ownership 9.5%)
- Kilmer Sports (holding company of Larry Tanenbaum) – 25%

Ownership structure following purchase by Rogers and Bell in 2012

MLSE; 100%
Rogers/Bell holding company 75%	Kilmer Sports; 25%
Rogers Communications; 50%	Bell holding company 50%	Larry Tanenbaum; 100%
BCE Inc. 74.67%	BCE Master Trust Fund; 25.33%

This ownership structure ensured that Rogers and Bell would vote their overall 75% interest in the company jointly, and thus decisions on the management of the company would need to be made by consensus of the two. (If Rogers and Bell owned their interests directly, either Rogers or Bell could be overruled by its competitor in combination with Tanenbaum.) As such, Rogers and Bell agreed that their previously four of six (subsequently six of eight) directors on the MLSE board would always vote together, and any disagreements between the two companies would be settled privately without the involvement of Tanenbaum. Bell and Rogers also agreed to equally split the media rights to its teams between them, with TSN and Sportsnet jointly holding the regional rights to the Maple Leafs and Toronto FC, and the media rights to the Raptors (which also includes the Canadian media rights to the NBA as a whole).

Bell indicated that the involvement of its pension fund was, at least in part, intended to ensure that it could retain its existing 18% interest in the NHL's Montreal Canadiens, as league rules prevent any shareholder that owns more than 30% of a team from holding an ownership position in any other team. The deal reportedly gave Rogers and Bell the right of first refusal of any sale of Tanenbaum's ownership share, and an option to purchase his stake on July 7, 2026. In 2015 MLSE initiated a corporate restructuring, with the plan to transfer most of its assets to another holding company, named "Maple Leaf Sports & Entertainment Partnership" (MLSEP), which would be wholly owned, directly and indirectly, by MLSE.

In January 2023, BCE Inc purchased the roughly 9% stake in MLSE held by its BCE Master Trust Fund for $149 million, consolidating its 37.5% total ownership share. In November 2023, Tanenbaum and OMERS announced that the latter had agreed to purchase 20% of Kilmer Sports (giving it an indirect 5% holding of MLSE) for US$400 million, valuing the company at US$8 billion. Tanenbaum continued in his management role of the company, with OMERS being a silent partner.

=== Rogers ===
On September 18, 2024, Rogers announced that it had reached an agreement to purchase BCE's 37.5% stake in MLSE for CA$4.7 billion, giving it ownership of 75% of the company and valuing it at CA$12.5 billion. The sale was subject to approval by Canadian regulators and the leagues, which was completed in June 2025 with the deal closing in July 2025. Bell stated that the sale would help it reduce its debt amid foundational changes at the company. As part of the transaction MLSE agreed to continue sublicensing approximately half of its media rights for the Maple Leafs and Raptors to Bell Media for up to 20 years at "fair market value", and Bell's official telecom sponsorships of the Argonauts, Raptors, and Toronto FC would be continue.

The acquisition made Rogers the majority owner of all five of Toronto's teams in the "big six" major professional sports leagues in the United States and Canada. Its ownership of MLSE was consolidated with its existing fully owned sports assets, including the Toronto Blue Jays, Rogers Centre and Sportsnet, within the Rogers Sports & Media segment.

Rogers retained an option to purchase the remaining 25% of MLSE owned by Tanenbaum's Kilmer Sports, and on July 6, 2026, it announced that Kilmer had agreed to sell it its equity stake for $4.35 billion, valuing the company at $17.4 billion. The acquisition was completed on October 1, 2026, giving Rogers 100% ownership of MLSE. Rogers created a new entity, Rogers Sports, to combine MLSE assets with its other sports, media, and entertainment assets.

Rogers has stated that it intends to bring in additional investors for its consolidated Sports & Media division, which it projects to be valued at more than $20 billion, but is expected to retain a controlling interest in the assets, selling between 20 and 30%.

== Assets ==
=== Sports teams ===
List of sports teams owned (and valuations estimated by Forbes):

- Toronto Maple Leafs (National Hockey League) – valued at US$4.4 billion in 2025, 1st in the NHL
  - Toronto Marlies (American Hockey League)
- Toronto Raptors (National Basketball Association) – valued at US$5.9 billion in 2026, 12th in the NBA
  - Raptors 905 (NBA G League)
  - Raptors Uprising GC (NBA 2K League)
- Toronto FC (Major League Soccer) – valued at US$725 million in 2026, 13th in MLS
  - Toronto FC II (MLS Next Pro)
  - Toronto FC Academy (MLS Next)
  - Toronto FC eSports (eMLS Cup)
- Toronto Argonauts (Canadian Football League)
Valuations of MLSE franchises since 1991 (in US dollars)
1991–1997: Financial World 1998–present: Forbes Maple Leafs Raptors TFC

=== Sports facilities ===
List of sports facilities owned:

- Scotiabank Arena – home of the Maple Leafs and Raptors
- OVO Athletic Centre – practice facility for the Raptors

List of sports facilities invested in and operated:

- BMO Field – home of Toronto FC, the Argonauts and Canada men's national soccer team
- BMO Training Ground – practice facility for Toronto FC and Toronto FC II, and home of the TFC Academy
- Coca-Cola Coliseum – home of the Marlies

List of sports facilities invested in:

- Ford Performance Centre – practice facility for the Maple Leafs and Marlies
- Lamport Stadium – practice facility for the Argonauts, and former home of Toronto FC II and the TFC Academy
- Mississauga Sports and Entertainment Centre – home and practice facility of the Raptors 905

=== Television channels ===
List of sports channels owned:

- NBA TV Canada – localized version of NBA TV, a basketball specialty channel, which also devotes part of its schedule to coverage of the Raptors (valued at $21 million on behalf of the CRTC in 2012)

=== Other ===
List of real estate, retail and hospitality, and entertainment companies owned:

- Maple Leaf Square (37.5%) – real estate development adjacent to the Scotiabank Arena, developed in partnership with Cadillac Fairview, which includes, among other tenants, the following businesses operated by MLSE:
  - Real Sports Bar & Grill – a sports-themed restaurant
  - e11even – upscale restaurant
- Real Sports Apparel – sports clothing store
- MLSE Live – concert promotion

=== Former ===
==== Sports teams ====
- Cincinnati Tigers – Central Hockey League (1981–1982)
- Denver Invaders/Victoria Maple Leafs – Western Hockey League (1963–1967)
- Hamilton Tiger-Cats – Canadian Football League (1978–1989)
- Rochester Americans – American Hockey League (1956–1966)
- Toronto Maple Leafs – International Lacrosse League (1932)
- Toronto Maple Leafs – National Lacrosse Association (1968–1968)
- Toronto Marlboros – Ontario Hockey Association/Ontario Hockey League (1927–1988)
- Tulsa Oilers/Oklahoma City Blazers – Central Professional Hockey League/Central Hockey League (1964–1976)

==== Facilities ====
===== Owned =====
- Maple Leaf Gardens – home of the Maple Leafs, Raptors, Marlboros (1931–2004)

===== Operated =====
- General Motors Centre – arena in Oshawa, Ontario (2006–2008)

==== Television channels ====
- GolTV Canada – localized version of Gol TV, a soccer specialty channel, which focused on Toronto FC (2009–2015)
- Leafs Nation Network – a specialty channel devoted to the Maple Leafs and Marlies (2001–2022)

== Bibliography ==
- Shea, Kevin; Wilson, Jason (2016). The Toronto Maple Leafs Hockey Club: The Official Centennial Publication. McClelland & Stewart. ISBN 978-0-7710-7929-0.
