= Soccer Shrines =

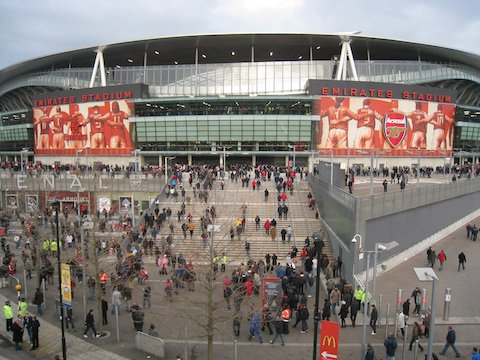
- A religious pilgrimage.
- Genre: Documentary
- Created by: Best Boy Entertainment
- Directed by: Mary Lewis
- Country of origin: Canada
- Original language: English
- No. of seasons: 1
- No. of episodes: 13

Production
- Executive producer: Ed Martin
- Producer: Ed Martin
- Running time: 30 minutes

Original release
- Network: GolTV (Canada), The Cave (TV channel)
- Release: 2010

Soccer Shrines is a 13-part Canadian television (TV) documentary series about the most famous soccer stadiums in the world and their fans. Produced by Best Boy Entertainment, Soccer Shrines originally aired on GolTV (Canada) in Fall 2010. The series currently airs on GolTV, Sundays at 11:30 am EST, Mondays 6:00 pm & 11:00 pm EST, Tuesday at 1:00 pm EST and on The Cave (TV channel) Sundays at 2:00 am & 8:30 pm EST and Wednesdays at 9:30 pm EST.

== Premise ==
Soccer Shrines brings audiences to 13 destinations to explore the near religious devotion of soccer fans worldwide. The show focuses on a famous soccer stadium in each location and delves into its history through the eyes of loyal fans. Each episode follows 3-4 fans on their journey to a famed soccer stadium.

== Places Visited ==
- Manchester, England
- Munich, Germany
- Amsterdam, Netherlands
- Paris, France
- Barcelona, Spain
- Marseille, France
- Glasgow, Scotland
- Milan, Italy
- London, England
- Johannesburg, South Africa
- Rio de Janeiro, Brazil
- Buenos Aires, Argentina

== Teams and Stadiums ==
- Manchester United F.C., Old Trafford
- FC Bayern Munich, Allianz Arena
- AFC Ajax, Amsterdam Arena
- Paris Saint-Germain F.C., Parc des Princes
- FC Barcelona, Camp Nou
- Olympique de Marseille, Stade Vélodrome
- Celtic F.C., Celtic Park
- Olympiacos F.C., Karaiskakis Stadium
- A.C. Milan, San Siro
- Arsenal F.C., Emirates Stadium
- Kaizer Chiefs F.C., Loftus Versfeld Stadium
- Flamengo, Estádio do Maracanã
- Boca Juniors, La Bombonera
