= Gol TV (Latin American TV channel) =

- Broadcast area: Latin America

Programming
- Language: Spanish
- Picture format: 480i/576i (SDTV); 1080i (HDTV)

Ownership
- Owner: Gol TV, Inc.

History
- Launched: 2005
- Closed: 31 December 2025

Links
- Website: http://latam.goltv.tv/es/

Gol TV was a Latin American pay television channel dedicated exclusively to soccer, part of Tenfield. Transmits to all Latin America.

GOL TV Latin America was shut down on 31 December 2025.

== Ownership ==
In Montevideo, Uruguay is Tenfield S.A. Broadcasting Corporation is the parent company of Gol TV. Enzo Francescoli is its Executive and Managing Director.

== Programming ==
- Primeira Liga
- Peruvian Primera División (only for Sport Boys and Universitario home matches) (except Peru)
- Primera División Uruguaya (except Uruguay)
- Campeonato Carioca

== Programs ==
- Golazos Special - A summary of the best goals of the leagues that GolTV transmits.
- Uruguayan Football – Football Uruguayan He will experience the thrills of Uruguayan football date after date.
- Especial GolTV - Interviews with prominent figures of Uruguayan football and / or world, from Uruguay by Martin Charquero, renowned personalities of world football.
- Fanaticos - is a talk show personalities of football and traveled by clubs.
- Fechas Pasadas - Recalling memorable matches of Uruguayan football.

== GOL TV HD ==
- GOL TV HD is a 1080i high definition simulcast of GOL TV which launched in late October 2014. It's a big bet for new times of change in the channel, currently available por5 July 6 Telecable La Paz Las Piedras Personal TV, TCC (Uruguay), VTR, Telsur, GTD Manquehue, Movistar Colombia, Movistar Chile, Megacable, Movistar TV (Peru), Claro Colombia, Cable TV Group.
- In late October 2014 the HD signal is released, for all Latin America. On 3 April Nelson Gutierrez, vice president of GolTV Latin America, said "We are excited, all our content, are from now on the highest quality", "GolTV HD was our subject slope, we wanted to be bringing all our audience this unique experience; enjoy the football in the best definition. To do this we make a huge effort and modernize our technology in order to provide a higher level of image "

== Gol TV Play ==
- Signal transmissions available for football games on your android, tablet, apple, etc. device currently has exclusive first division of Uruguay, available Cable TV Group.

== See also ==
- GolTV Canada
- GOL TV
