= Leafs Nation Network =

Defunct Canadian regional specialty TV channel

- Country: Canada
- Broadcast area: Ontario; excluding the Ottawa Valley
- Headquarters: Toronto, Ontario

Programming
- Picture format: 480i (SDTV); 1080i (HDTV)

Ownership
- Owner: Maple Leaf Sports & Entertainment (Toronto Maple Leafs Network Ltd.)
- Sister channels: NBA TV Canada

History
- Launched: September 7, 2001; 24 years ago
- Closed: August 31, 2022
- Former names: Leafs TV (2001–2017)

Links
- Website: Leafs Nation Network

Leafs Nation Network (formerly Leafs TV) was a Canadian English language Category B regional specialty channel owned by Maple Leaf Sports & Entertainment Ltd. Leafs Nation Network broadcasts programming related to the Toronto Maple Leafs National Hockey League club and its American Hockey League affiliate, the Toronto Marlies.

Leafs Nation Network was only available within the Maple Leafs' "home market" of Ontario, excluding the Ottawa Valley (which is in the home market of the Ottawa Senators).

== History ==
In November 2000, MLSE (Maple Leaf Sports and Entertainment), was granted approval by the Canadian Radio-television and Telecommunications Commission (CRTC) to launch a television channel called Maple Leaf Channel, described as "a regional English-language Category 2 specialty television service devoted to the Toronto Maple Leafs. Programming was to include historical events, profiles of players, panel and call-in shows, classic Maple Leaf hockey games, interviews with Maple Leaf players, coaches and management, statistics, insights and analysis of the current hockey scene from a Maple Leaf perspective, and information as to the purchase of merchandise, tickets and collectibles. There was also to be a small amount of programming related to general hockey matters, including minor hockey league hockey and hockey instruction." The channel was launched on September 7, 2001 as Leafs TV. The channel was valued at $19 million on behalf of the CRTC in 2012.

From the channel's launch until the 2014–15 season, the Leafs retained a small number of regional telecasts for broadcast on Leafs TV, typically around 12 games per season. That changed going into the 2014–15 NHL season when regional rights formerly held by the channel went to Sportsnet Ontario and TSN4.

On October 7, 2017, Leafs TV was renamed as Leafs Nation Network and re-launched as a multi-platform iteration of Leafs TV, with most of its programming shifting to the team's website and mobile apps and the television network slowly becoming an overall afterthought with the shift of content over to streaming and a lack of live games. It continued to carry pre-game and post-game coverage and other documentary programming.

On August 16, 2022, Toronto Sun's Lance Hornby reported that MLSE announced that the channel would go off the air on August 31. At MLSE's request, the CRTC formally revoked Leafs Nation Network's license on September 1. Immediately after that, the channel space created in 2001 by Leafs TV ceased to exist.

== Programming ==
Programming on Leafs Nation Network included re-airings of recent and past games (both in entirety, and edited), pre- and post-game shows, biographies of players and other personalities and other related programming.

Leafs Nation Network broadcast all Toronto Marlies home games. The channel broadcast the 2014 Calder Cup Finals between the Texas Stars (Dallas Stars AHL team) and the St. John's Ice Caps (Winnipeg Jets AHL team) which simulcasted in the U.S. on NHL Network.

== Hosts ==
- Jody Vance - lead anchor 2006 to 2009
- Bob McGill - Network reporter, and former Leafs player
- Joe Bowen - Toronto Maple Leafs play-by-play voice
- Brian McFarlane - Toronto Maple Leafs color commentator/studio host
- Todd Crocker - Toronto Marlies play-by-play voice

== Former analysts ==
- Scott Burnside - Sports journalist
- Greg Millen - Toronto Maple Leafs colour commentator
- Harry Neale - Toronto Maple Leafs colour commentator
- Mark Osborne - Toronto Maple Leafs analyst

== Leafs Nation Network HD ==
In November 2006 Maple Leaf Sports & Entertainment Ltd. launched an HD simulcast of Leafs TV. Originally, the channel was only available during live Maple Leafs' games that broadcast in HD; however, in June 2011, the channel began broadcasting on a full-time basis. Despite being a full-time feed, Leafs Nation Network pregames, post-games and live Leafs are only carried on satellite providers such as Bell Satellite TV and Shaw Direct.
