= Ford Performance Centre =

Hockey facility in Toronto, Ontario

- Lakeshore Arena

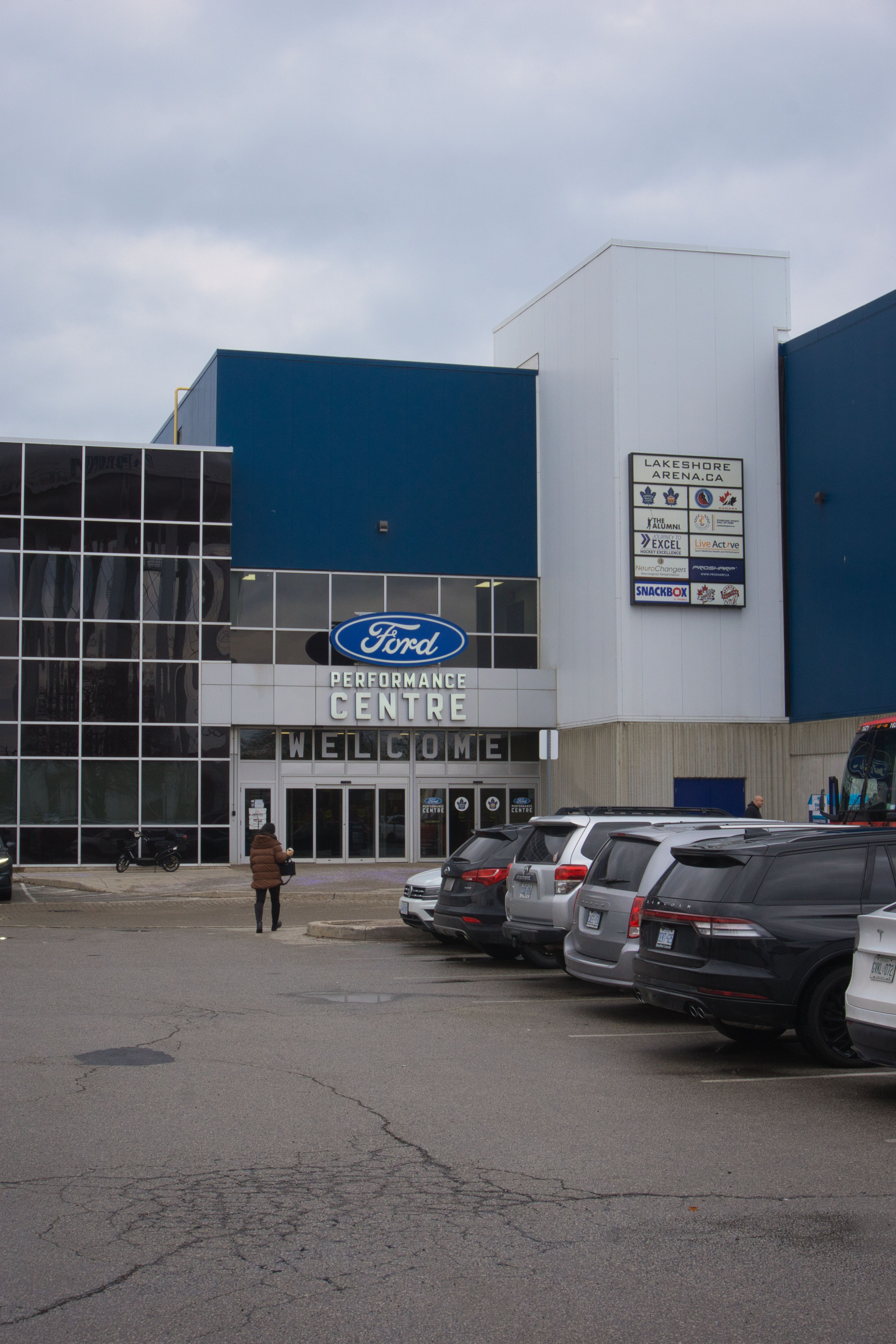
- Interactive map of Ford Performance Centre
- Full name: Ford Performance Centre
- Former names: Mastercard Centre for Hockey Excellence (2009–2019)
- Address: 400 Kipling Avenue; Toronto, Ontario; M8V 3L1
- Coordinates: 43.603485°N 79.52011°W
- Owner: City of Toronto
- Operator: Maple Leaf Sports & Entertainment
- Capacity: Rink 1 - 1,000; Rink 2,3,4 - 200
- Field size: (1) 200' x 100' and (3) 200' x 85'

Construction
- Opened: September 8, 2009
- Cost: $44 million

Tenants
- Toronto Maple Leafs (practice facility); Toronto Marlies (practice facility); Toronto Furies (CWHL) (2011–2019); Hockey Hall of Fame; Hockey Canada; NHL Alumni Association; Etobicoke Dolphins; Journey to Excel; 101 Sports Group; Zuperior Sports Store; Etobicoke Sports Hall of Fame

Website
- lakeshorearena.ca

The Ford Performance Centre, formerly Mastercard Centre For Hockey Excellence, is a hockey facility located in the Etobicoke district of Toronto, Ontario, Canada. It has four ice pads and is the official practice facility of the Toronto Maple Leafs NHL hockey team, and their AHL affiliate the Toronto Marlies. The building also houses offices for Hockey Canada and the Hockey Hall of Fame and was home to the Toronto Furies of the Canadian Women's Hockey League. The land is owned by the Toronto District School Board as 400 Kipling Avenue.

== Construction and management ==
The Ford Performance Centre, which is located at 400 Kipling Avenue in the New Toronto neighbourhood of Toronto, opened in September 2009. It was built as a joint venture between the Lakeshore Lions Club, the Toronto Maple Leafs, and the City of Toronto government to replace the nearby Lakeshore Lions Arena. According to Mastercard, the arena is "the first community ice facility to be built in the Toronto-area in the last 25 years."

Originally planned to cost $29 million, rising expenses resulted in the final cost being CA$44 million. The Lions Club contributed $40 million to the project, with the city providing a $35.5 million loan guarantee. The Toronto District School Board leased the land for the arena to the Lakeshore Lions for a 50-year term. Maple Leaf Sports & Entertainment (MLSE) spent a further $5 million on training and medical facilities to make the building the practice rink of their two hockey teams, the Toronto Maple Leafs and Toronto Marlies. The Toronto Maple Leafs Hockey School is also held at the arena. MLSE pays $600,000 annually to rent the building, and receive 50% of naming rights revenues. Mastercard purchased the naming rights to the facility for $525,000 a year.

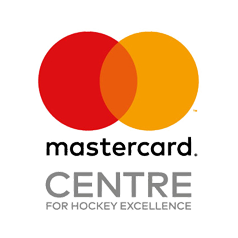
Logo of the facility from 2009–2019, when it was known as the Mastercard Centre for Hockey Excellence.

The arena was initially operated by the Lakeshore Lions Club. However in June 2011, with the arena facing financial difficulties due in part to not securing tenants for a planned restaurant and sporting goods store at the facility and unable to manage its rising debt, the City of Toronto decided to take control. On September 8, 2011 the city established the Lakeshore Arena Corporation, an arms-length corporation, to take over management of the arena and assume its $43.4 million debt. The city's intention was to return it to private management within 2–3 years, with a councillor suggesting that MLSE, which operated BMO Field and the CNE Coliseum on behalf of the city, would be "the logical party" to take over the arena. A spokesperson for the company said that "while we don't have any interest in purchasing the facility, we are open to discussing the possibility of managing the facility on behalf of the City". MLSE's executive vice president of venues and entertainment Bob Hunter confirmed that they would bid for the right to run the building.

With $19 million in loans maturing in 2014, and unable to privately refinance them, the city decided to provide a short-term interest only loan directly to the arena. In November 2015, after concluding that the arena's debt was unsustainable, the city voted to convert $8.1 million of this loan into a capital contribution, to be repaid annually based of a percentage of arena's net income. In October 2017 Infrastructure Ontario (IO) provided the arena a $26.7 million loan to refinance it's remaining outstanding private debt as well as a portion of the city's loan, with the city acting as guarantor for this amount and continuing to provide a short-term interest only loan for the remaining debt of $4 million. As of December 31, 2025, $20.5 million was still outstanding on the IO loan, while the full $4 million of the city loan had not been repaid. In 2026, the city agreed to refinance its $4 million loan to the arena over a 17 year term.

In the first half of 2019, Ford acquired the naming rights to the facility for an undisclosed amount, renaming it the Ford Performance Centre.

== Facilities and usage ==
The facility has four NHL-sized rinks, one of which can be expanded to Olympic dimensions with 1000 seats, as well as extensive training facilities.

The arena is used by the Toronto Maple Leafs of the NHL and Toronto Marlies of the AHL as their practice facility, as well as by numerous visiting National Hockey League teams, and Hockey Canada for its national teams. The NHL Alumni Association is also based at the Ford Performance Centre.

The rink is also available for ice rentals by the public for leagues, tournaments, private rentals and special events. The Faustina Hockey Club offers both community house league and Select Hockey programs at the Ford Performance Centre. On Saturdays from September through June, Ford provides open, free ice skating for families. In 2011, it was the host venue for the third season of the CBC reality figure skating competition Battle of the Blades, and subsequently hosted the fourth season in 2013.

The venue hosted an international short track competition for the first time in November 2015.

== See also ==
- OVO Athletic Centre, another practice facility managed by Maple Leaf Sports & Entertainment
