= OVO Athletic Centre =

Basketball practice facility in Toronto, Canada

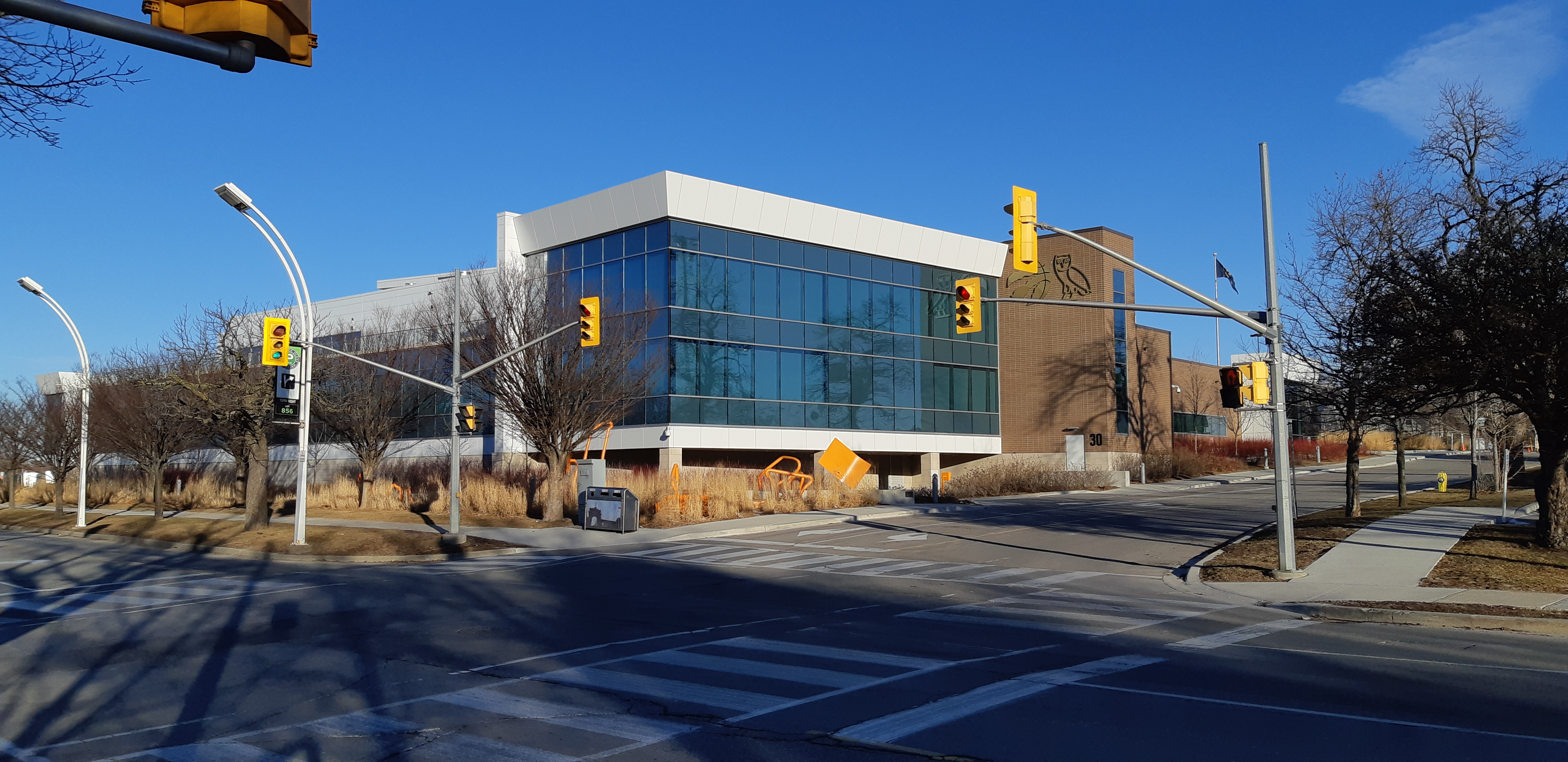
- Viewed from the south-east.
- Interactive map of OVO Athletic Centre
- Former names: BioSteel Centre (2016-18); Toronto Raptors Training Centre (2018-19)
- Address: 30 British Columbia Road
- Location: Toronto, Ontario, Canada
- Coordinates: 43°37′55″N 79°25′41″W
- Owner: Maple Leaf Sports & Entertainment
- Field size: 68,000 ft^{2} (6,300 m^{2})

Construction
- Opened: February 10, 2016
- Cost: CA$30 million
- Architects: Guernsey Architects (lead architect); Baldwin & Franklin (supporting architects)
- General contractor: EllisDon

Tenants
- Toronto Raptors (NBA) (2016–present); Canada men's national basketball team Canada women's national basketball team

The OVO Athletic Centre, formerly the BioSteel Centre and the Toronto Raptors Training Centre, is a basketball practice facility in Toronto, Ontario, Canada. Opened on February 10, 2016, the facility is home to the Toronto Raptors of the National Basketball Association (NBA), and owned by the team's owner, Maple Leaf Sports & Entertainment (MLSE). It is located on leased public land in Exhibition Place, near Dufferin Street and the Gardiner Expressway, west of downtown. It is named for October's Very Own, the Canadian lifestyle brand and record label founded by rapper Aubrey "Drake" Graham, talent manager Oliver El-Khatib, and record producer Noah "40" Shebib.

== Facility ==
The 68,000-square-foot (6,300 m^{2}) two-storey facility has two full-size basketball courts, locker rooms, training and medical facilities, player amenities, and a "technologically advanced cognitive operations centre" powered by IBM Watson, which consolidates and analyzes data for display on the centre's displays and on mobile devices.

Along with the Raptors, Canada Basketball and Raptors 905, the Raptors NBA G League affiliate team based in Mississauga, also use the facility. A section of the facility is reserved for MLSE, another is for community use and the basketball courts are shared between MLSE and community use.

== History ==
In November 2013, it was reported that MLSE had contracted an architect to design a new practice facility for the Raptors. The team had trained on a practice court located within the Air Canada Centre (now the Scotiabank Arena) since its opening in 1999, and a new facility would allow this space to be repurposed into a restaurant or nightclub. MLSE proposed to build the facility on parking lot lands in the west end of City-owned Exhibition Place. The proposal meant the loss of 200 parking spaces, which would be replaced by replacing an adjacent ball diamond with a new parking lot. The proposal was approved by the Board of Governors of Exhibition Place on August 14, 2014, the Executive Committee of Toronto City Council on August 20, and the full Toronto City Council on August 25. Construction began in November 2014, with the facility completed in time for the team's hosting of the NBA All-Star Game in February 2016.

Under the terms of the lease agreement, MLSE paid the CA$30 million construction cost of the facility and parking lot. MLSE leases the property from the City for $205,000 annually, plus city taxes, subject to reassessments for inflation, for a 20-year term, with two options to extend it by a further ten years, following which the City will take ownership of the building. MLSE requested that the City exempt the portion of the facility that is available to the public (32%) from city taxes. MLSE pledged to make the facility available for community use during the majority of daytime and evening hours. MLSE would contribute to the cost of a parking study of Exhibition Place, leading to a new parking facility and the reconstruction of green space to replace the ball diamond. The annual CNE Lions Club youth baseball tournament, which had been played at the diamond, was moved to Coronation Park, east of Exhibition Place, as an interim measure.

In November 2015, it was announced that the facility would be named the BioSteel Centre, after corporate sponsor BioSteel Sports Nutrition. This ended in 2018 and the facility was renamed the Toronto Raptors Training Centre. On March 14, 2019, the Raptors announced that they had reached an agreement with OVO on a naming rights deal to rebrand the facility as the OVO Athletic Centre.

== See also ==
- Ford Performance Centre, another practice facility managed by Maple Leaf Sports & Entertainment
