= GolTV (Canadian TV channel) =

Canadian specialty television channel

- Country: Canada
- Broadcast area: Nationwide
- Headquarters: Toronto, Ontario

Programming
- Picture format: 480i (SDTV); 1080i (HDTV)

Ownership
- Owner: Maple Leaf Sports & Entertainment

History
- Launched: November 1, 2005
- Closed: August 31, 2015

GolTV was a Canadian English language Category B specialty channel. GolTV was exclusively dedicated to soccer, with live and recorded sporting events from around the world, and news programs. GolTV was owned by Maple Leaf Sports & Entertainment (MLSE).

== History ==
In August 2005, Insight Sports (on behalf of a corporation to be incorporated) was granted a television broadcasting licence by the Canadian Radio-television and Telecommunications Commission (CRTC) for The Soccer Net, described as "a national English-language Category 2 specialty programming undertaking devoted to soccer and soccer enthusiasts. The programming will focus on instruction from beginner to advanced play and on amateur and professional soccer games. All of the programming will be devoted to soccer or soccer-related subjects."

The channel was launched on November 1, 2005, as GolTV. At some point, GOL TV USA, a division of Tenfield, purchased a minority interest in the channel.

On November 7, 2007, GolTV provided live broadband coverage of the Vancouver Whitecaps FC’s friendly home game against David Beckham and the Major League Soccer’s Los Angeles Galaxy over the internet on a pay-per-view basis.

On January 23, 2009, Maple Leaf Sports and Entertainment, owners of Major League Soccer franchise Toronto FC (along with other major sports teams in the city), announced they would acquire Insight Sports' interest in GolTV. The deal was approved by the CRTC on June 2, 2009. In 2015, MLSE reported to the CRTC that it had bought out GOL TV USA's stake in the channel.

On July 6, 2015, in a notice to revoke the licence of GolTV Canada posted on the CRTC website, it was revealed that the channel would be ceasing operations on August 31, 2015. According to the timetable shown on their website, GolTV Canada would cease broadcasting on August 31, 2015, after it finished airing the whole third season of a Toronto FC documentary "All For One" starting at 9:30 pm (Eastern Time), while their website would redirect to the Toronto FC's website.

== Programming ==
GolTV Canada featured live and taped events from the following leagues and competitions:

- Brazil: Campeonato Brasileiro, Campeonato Carioca, Campeonato Paulista
- Mexico: Liga de Ascenso (2nd division)

=== Other programs ===
- Bundesliga Magazine
- Canadian Football Weekly
- Foot Brazil
- Football Today
- GolTV News
- Hallo Bundesliga
- Liga BBVA
- MLS Weekly
- Off The Pitch
- Oh My Gol!

=== Past programming ===
GolTV previously aired coverage of Spain's La Liga. Since mid-2012, the Canadian broadcast rights to that league have been owned by the upstart Al Jazeera-owned channel beIN Sport.

== High definition ==
GolTV announced on December 5, 2011, that it would launch HD programming in partnership with the RealSports and Xbox 360. HD programming will be available via a free app for the Xbox 360 with a monthly subscription fee.

GolTV officially launched its HD service on television systems in November 2012 with EastLink. GolTV Canada HD was also available on Ch.428 on Rogers.

== See also ==
- GOL TV (Latin American)
- GOL TV (United States)
