= Estate freeze =

An estate freeze is a legal estate-planning technique used in Canada to lock in the current value (and tax liability) of a capital property for one person, while attributing the value of future growth of that capital property to another person.

This technique provides taxation, estate planning and business advantages by ensuring current owners (e.g. parents) of an asset can continue to control that asset while allowing other persons (e.g. children) to benefit from (and be liable for the taxes payable on) the increase in value of the asset after the date of the estate freeze.

Practical uses of an estate freeze include transfer of control of a privately held business between generations, deferral of the taxes payable upon the disposition of the shares of that business, income-splitting between family members and protection of assets from creditors. Appreciating assets may be transferred from parents to their children on a tax-deferred basis, with the parents retaining control of the assets during their lifetime.
