= GOL TV =

American TV channel broadcasting soccer

- Country: United States
- Headquarters: Coral Gables, Florida

Programming
- Languages: English and Spanish
- Picture format: 480i (SDTV); 1080i (HDTV)

Ownership
- Owner: Gol TV, Inc.
- Key people: Enzo Francescoli (CEO)

History
- Launched: February 1, 2003
- Closed: December 31, 2025

Availability

Streaming media
- Fubo TV: Internet Protocol Television

GOL TV was an American TV sports channel dedicated to soccer owned by GOLTV Inc., based in Coral Gables, Florida. The network broadcast Liga 1 and Campeonato Uruguay matches.

The network was among the first to start a trend of bilingual broadcasting among networks to serve both English language and Spanish language customers, a strategy since emulated by competitor beIN Sports with their English and Spanish networks. GOL TV maintained one main feed with both English and Spanish language audio and bilingual promotional advertising (though paid programming can vary between English and Spanish and is not cross-translated).

== Ownership ==
GOL TV is a corporation of Florida, in the United States. As of 2012, Enzo Francescoli was its CEO and managing director.

== History ==
In early 2004, the channel was available in 5.1 million households; Tenfield expected the number to rise to 8 million by the end of the year.

On October 1, 2018, Verizon FiOS removed the channel from the line-up. Cox removed it from the lineup on April 1, 2019.

On January 10, 2024, the channel was removed from Spectrum. The channel was shut down on December 31, 2025.

== Talent ==
In English (based in Lima, Peru unless otherwise noted)

- Nino Torres: play-by-play (lead)
- Manuel Oyola: play-by-play
- Piero Rodríguez: play-by-play
- Juan Pablo Borges: General Announcer and voice of Portugol, Tu Fútbol Uruguay and GoGoGoal (based in Montevideo, Uruguay)

In Spanish (based in Montevideo, Uruguay)

- Bruno Piñero: All Portuguese matches as lead narrator. Also Spanish voice of Tu Fútbol Uruguay
- Mauricio Raggiotto: All Portuguese matches as commentator. Also voice of Portugol and GoGoGoal

== Programs ==
=== Portugal ===
- Primeira Liga (Portugal)

=== CONMEBOL ===
- Peruvian Primera División (one or two matches each week, broadcast taken from GOLPERU)
- Uruguayan Primera División

=== Other programs ===
- Tu Fútbol - A weekly series that provides a recap and highlights of league matches from Uruguay. Tu Fútbol: Uruguay airs on Monday at 7:30 p.m. ET.
- Portugol - A weekly series showcasing a full recap and highlights of the Portuguese Primeira Liga. The program airs every Tuesday night starting at 7:30 p.m. ET.
- Foot Brazil - A weekly series that provides a recap and highlights of all the games from the São Paulo State Championship and the Brasileirão Serie A, as well as interviews with the biggest stars of Brazilian soccer. It airs on Wednesdays at 7 p.m. and 10 p.m. ET.
- The Football Review
- Clubland

=== Former programs ===
- Campeonato Brasileiro, Campeonato Paulista
- Spanish La Liga (2004–2012), Copa del Rey
- Dutch Eredivisie
- KNVB Cup
- Johan Cruyff Shield
- UEFA Europa League
- CONCACAF qualifiers for the Gold Cup and FIFA World Cup
- Lamar Hunt U.S. Open Cup Final
- German Bundesliga
- Coppa Italia
- Supercoppa Italiana
- Ecuadorian Serie A

== GOL TV HD ==
GOL TV HD is a 1080i high definition simulcast of GOL TV that launched on August 1, 2010. Time Warner Cable in New York City added it on August 27, 2010.

== See also ==
- GolTV Canada
- GOL TV (Latin American)
