= Tim Leiweke =

American sports executive (born 1957)

CEO of the Oak View Group (OVG)
- In office November 16, 2015 – July 9, 2025
- Preceded by: Office established

CEO and President of MLSE
- In office April 26, 2013 – October 29, 2015
- Preceded by: Tom Anselmi
- Succeeded by: Michael Friisdahl

CEO and President of AEG
- In office 1996 – March 14, 2013
- Preceded by: Office established
- Succeeded by: Dan Beckerman

Personal details
- Born: April 21, 1957 (age 69) St. Louis, Missouri, US

Timothy Joseph Leiweke (born April 21, 1957) is an American businessman who was the chief executive officer of Oak View Group. He was previously president and CEO of Maple Leaf Sports & Entertainment (MLSE) and president and CEO of Anschutz Entertainment Group (AEG). He held roughly a 4% stake in AEG as of 2012, and is well known for his relationship with notoriously reclusive AEG founder and Denver-based billionaire Philip Anschutz, whom he has known since the early 1990s. Since November 2015, Leiweke has been the CEO of Oak View Group, "a global advisory, development, and investment company for the sports and live entertainment industries". On July 9, 2025, he was indicted by the DOJ for violating the Sherman Act and subsequently stepped down as CEO of Oak View Group, taking a position as vice chair pending the outcome of the litigation. Recent reports have also shed light on his alleged shady dealings with Live Nation and Ticketmaster which resulted in illegal kickbacks in the tens of millions. On December 2, 2025 he received a pardon from President Trump.

== Anschutz Entertainment Group ==
Leiweke was president and CEO of Anschutz Entertainment Group (AEG), which owns the Los Angeles Kings, the Los Angeles Galaxy, part of the Los Angeles Lakers, and the L.A. Live entertainment complex. AEG also owns multiple sporting and entertainment venues around the world such as the Dignity Health Sports Park in Los Angeles and the O2 Arena in London, which it manages. In September 2012 it was announced that AEG would be put up for sale. A deal for the privately owned group, reportedly worth up to US$10 billion, was expected to be announced sometime in the first half of 2013. On March 14, 2013 Anschutz announced that AEG was no longer for sale. In an interview, Anschutz said that he had recently become "reengaged" in the business and also suggested the company had failed to receive bids close to the $8 to $10 billion asking price.

On the same day that it was announced the sale had been called off, it was announced Leiweke would be replaced as President and CEO by AEG executive Dan Beckerman, who previously was the chief operating officer and chief financial officer. The change in leadership was attributed by some analysts as a reaction to the failure AEG experienced in attracting serious bidders during the sale process and its inability to securing a National Football League (NFL) occupant (team) for Farmers Field, a proposed stadium next to L.A. Live.

== Maple Leafs Sports and Entertainment ==
Leiweke became the president and CEO of Maple Leafs Sports & Entertainment (MLSE) on April 26, 2013. MLSE is 75% owned by Rogers Communications and Bell Canada. MLSE's properties are the Toronto Maple Leafs of the National Hockey League (NHL), the Toronto Raptors of the National Basketball Association (NBA) and the Major League Soccer team Toronto FC, as well as multiple sport and residential properties including Scotiabank Arena, Ricoh Coliseum, and Maple Leaf Square.

He made headlines in Toronto when he declared he had the Leafs' Stanley Cup victory parade mapped out, a bold declaration consider the Leafs had last won a Cup in 1967. During his tenure, Leiweke lived in Toronto. He was integral in the signings of Toronto FC designated players Michael Bradley, Jermain Defoe, and Sebastian Giovinco as well as the hiring of Maple Leafs president Brendan Shanahan and Raptors president Masai Ujiri.

On August 21, 2014, Leiweke announced that he would be leaving MLSE and would remain in his role until June 30, 2015 or until MLSE had named his successor. He left MLSE on October 29, 2015 after the appointment of Michael Friisdahl as his successor.

== Oak View Group ==
On November 16, 2015, Leiweke and his business partner, Irving Azoff, founded Oak View Group (OVG), a "global advisory, development and investment company for the sports and live entertainment industries". Leiweke is OVG's CEO. As of 2024, its global corporate headquarters is headquartered in Denver with regional offices based in Los Angeles, New York City, Philadelphia, London, and Toronto.

On December 4, 2017, the Seattle City Council voted 7–1 to approve a memorandum of understanding with the OVG for the renovation of KeyArena. Renovations for the arena began in 2018 and were completed in 2021.

On December 7, the NHL's board of governors agreed to consider an application for an expansion team from Seattle, the Seattle Kraken, with an expansion fee set at $650 million. The Seattle ownership group is represented by David Bonderman and Jerry Bruckheimer. On February 20, Mayor Jenny Durkan launched an NHL campaign during her State of the City and announced that Oak View Group would be initiating a season ticket drive on March 1, 2018. On December 4, 2018, the National Hockey League announced that the league would expand to Seattle in 2021 with the approval of the group's bid.

On July 9, 2025, he was indicted by the DOJ for violating the Sherman Act and subsequently stepped down as CEO of Oak View Group, taking a position as Vice Chair on the Board of Directors pending the outcome of the litigation.

On December 3, 2025, Leiweke received a “full and unconditional" pardon from President Donald Trump.

== Personal life ==
Leiweke is married to Bernadette. They have one daughter, Francesca, who is married to Troy Bodie, both a pro hockey scout and a former player with the Toronto Maple Leafs. As of 2024, Francesca is the chief operating officer for her father's company, Oak View Group.

Tim's younger brother, Tod Leiweke, is the chief executive officer and president of the Seattle Kraken of the NHL; Tod was the chief operating officer of the NFL from 2015 to 2018.

Leiweke invested in EFL Championship club Bolton Wanderers in July 2026, and joined its board of directors.

== See also ==
- List of people granted executive clemency in the second Trump presidency
