= Richard Peddie =

Canadian businessman

Richard A. Peddie

CEO and President of MLSE
- In office October 1998 – December 31, 2011
- Preceded by: new post
- Succeeded by: Tom Anselmi - as President

Personal details
- Born: January 1947 (age 79) Windsor, Ontario
- Education: University of Windsor

Richard A. Peddie (born January 1947) is a Canadian businessman. He is the former president and CEO of Maple Leafs Sports and Entertainment.

== Career ==
Peddie was president and CEO of SkyDome from August 1989 to 1994. In 1993, he took a leave of absence for six months to join Larry Tanenbaum's Palestra Group, which included Labatt, in their pursuit of an expansion National Basketball Association team for Toronto, which was ultimately awarded to a competing group and became the Toronto Raptors. While employed by the SkyDome, he was twice offered the head job of the Toronto Argonauts of the Canadian Football League, who played at the SkyDome.

Peddie was named the president and COO of Labatt Communications in 1994, a subsidiary of Labatt Brewing Company whose assets included The Sports Network and Discovery Channel Canada. During his time with Labatt's, which also owned the Argonauts and Toronto Blue Jays of Major League Baseball, he was involved with attempts by the company to purchasing a National Football League team and relocate it to Toronto's SkyDome.

=== Maple Leafs Sports and Entertainment ===
Richard Peddie was named president and CEO of the Toronto Raptors in November 1996. After Maple Leaf Gardens Ltd. (owner of the Toronto Maple Leafs) purchased the Toronto Raptors and the arena the team was building, Air Canada Centre, on February 12, 1998, Peddie took control of the renamed Maple Leaf Sports and Entertainment in October 1998, serving as president and CEO for fourteen years until his retirement effective December 31, 2011. He oversaw all business and team operations related to the Toronto Maple Leafs, the Toronto Raptors, Toronto FC, the Toronto Marlies, the operations of the Air Canada Centre, BMO Field, Ricoh Coliseum, the organization's three television channels (Leafs TV, NBA TV Canada, GolTV Canada) and Maple Leaf Square.

In his first nine years in charge of MLSE, its value tripled to $1.5 billion. On December 9, 2011, shortly before Peddie retired, the Ontario Teachers' Pension Plan announced the sale of its 79.53% majority stake in MLSE to Bell Canada and Rogers Communications, in a deal valued at $1.32 billion.

=== Post MLSE ===
Richard Peddie now owns and operates an independent book store called "River Bookshop" in the town of Amherstburg, Ontario, Canada.

== Personal life ==
Born in Windsor, Ontario, Peddie graduated from the University of Windsor in 1970 and received an honorary doctorate from the institution in 2001. Peddie lives in Amherstburg with his wife.

Preceded by John Bitove	Toronto Raptors CEO; 1993–1997	Succeeded by Michael Friisdahl
