= Los Angeles Stadium =

Los Angeles Stadium may refer to:

- SoFi Stadium the current NFL stadium in Inglewood, California, United States (Note: known as Los Angeles Stadium at Hollywood Park during construction, the stadium was called Los Angeles Stadium during the 2026 FIFA World Cup)
- Los Angeles Stadium in the City of Industry (2008) former proposed stadium in Industry, California, United States
- Carson Stadium (2015) former proposed stadium in Carson, California, United States
- Farmers Field (2010) former proposed stadium in downtown Los Angeles
