= Dan Beckerman =

American sports executive

CEO and President of AEG
- Preceded by: Tim Leiweke

Dan Beckerman is the president and CEO of Anschutz Entertainment Group.

== Biography ==
=== Formation ===
Beckerman has a master's degree in business administration from the UCLA Anderson School of Management. He received his undergraduate degree in economics from UCLA. A senior accountant at Arthur Anderson in Los Angeles, he specialized in corporate taxation.

=== Career ===
Beckerman replaced Tim Leiweke as President and CEO of AEG executive The change in leadership was attributed by some analysts as a reaction to the failure AEG experienced in attracting serious bidders during the sale process and its inability securing an NFL occupant for the Farmers Field, a proposed stadium next to L.A. Live.

The vice president of finance for the Los Angeles Clippers for two seasons, Beckerman became the leading global sports and live-entertainment conglomerate associated with 150 venues for 100 million guests. Responsible for financial oversight, long-range planning and debt financing for the company's real estate projects, representing global investments of more than $5 billion, he served first for 16 years as chief operating officer and chief financial officer for AEG. Beckerman serves on the Board of Governors for both MLS and the NHL and the board of directors for The Grammy Museum and UCLA's Anderson School of Management.

=== Family ===
He lives in Los Angeles and has a wife, Annette, and two daughters, Olivia and Julia.
