= New AS Roma Stadium =

Football stadium in Rome, Italy

New A.S. Roma Stadium
- Interactive map of New A.S. Roma Stadium
- Former names: Stadio della Roma
- Location: Rome, Italy
- Coordinates: 41°55′04″N 12°32′03″E
- Owner: A.S. Roma
- Capacity: 60,605

Construction
- Groundbreaking: 2027 (planned)
- Opened: 2030 (planned)
- Cost: €1.047 billion
- Architect: Populous

Tenant
- A.S. Roma

The New A.S. Roma Stadium is a football stadium to be built in Rome, Italy for use by A.S. Roma, which is expected to succeed their current stadium, Stadio Olimpico, from 2030.

The 60,605-seat stadium is planned to be built in the Pietralata area, which is served by Roma Tiburtina for high-speed rail and Quintiliani on Line B on the Rome Metro. Additions to existing transport links and extensions to other services, including on the FL1 railway, are planned to be built to serve the stadium and its wider complex, which is set to include entertainment and shopping facilities, and Roma's training center.

== History ==
=== Tor di Valle proposal ===
The project of a new stadium in the Tor di Valle area, so called Stadio della Roma, was proposed by the club chairman James Pallotta and designed by American architect Dan Meis with engineering firm SCE Project and Arup. Set to cost €300 million, the design took inspiration from the ancient Colosseum, while features of the planned stadium included luxury boxes and 14,000-seater replica of the Curva Sud section in the Stadio Olimpico. In 2016, Goldman Sachs gave a €30 million loan to Stadio TDV S.p.A., a wholly owned subsidiary of NEEP Roma Holding, for pre-development costs of the stadium.

On 2 February 2017, the Region of Lazio and the mayor of Rome rejected the Stadio della Roma project. It was approved on 24 February after adjustments were made to the stadium's design and construction. In August 2017, the project faced further delays, and a new plan was ultimately developed a month later, with Roma subsequently renewing their lease on the Stadio Olimpico until 2020. That December, the new plans were approved, and the stadium was expected to open in time for the 2020–21 season. However, on 26 February 2021, it was announced that the project in the Tor di Valle area was halted indefinitely.

=== Current project ===
In 2022, the Pietralata area of Rome was chosen as the new location for the construction of the stadium by the club owner Dan Friedkin. The area is presently served by Roma Tiburtina and Quintiliani on Line B on the Rome Metro. Publicly-funded plans are set to develop other lines on the Rome Metro for the stadium, including extending the Rome Metro to Quintiliani, and onto Muratella, which is the closest station to the area on the FL1 railway. A pedestrian and cycling bridge over Via Livorno is also expected to be included as well as tram lines between Togliatti and Tiburtina, and tunnels and viaducts on Via dei Monti Tiburtini.

Archeological surveys on the Pietralata site started in April 2024, recommenced in May after a short pause, but were halted in July by the Regional Administrative Court of Rome after numerous complaints by local businesses. However, later that month, A.S. Roma and city mayor Roberto Gualtieri announced the New AS Roma Stadium designed by Populous, which detailed a capacity of 55,000 (expandable to 62,000 for other events) and a wider complex to include entertainment and shopping facilities, and the club's training center. In 2024, it was revealed that project is expected to cost €1 billion (despite A.S. Roma publicly stating it will cost half that amount), making it the most expensive stadium in Italy.

In April 2025, the team's chief administrative officer announced that the stadium will have more than 60,000 seats, with a range between 61,000 and 62,000 and that the costs, entirely private, will be more than a million. Dan Friedkin personally designed the Curva Sud, with the desire to make it the most sloping and largest in the world, both in terms of spectators and size. Inspired by The Yellow Wall of Borussia Dortmund, but with the ambition to surpass it. It will have 21,000 seats, becoming the largest curved stand of seating spectators in the world. The stadium's current project is set-up for a capacity of 60,605, with one stand having 23,000 seats, making it among the largest in Europe. As of February 2026, the club's total investment into the project is set to amount to €1.047bn (£917.08m/$1.24bn), of which €696.37m is earmarked for the construction of the stadium and the remainder for the urban development works.

Construction was expected to start between 2025 and 2026 and expected to conclude by 2027, on the occasion of the club's centenary. However, this was delayed to 2030. The proposed site of the stadium has faced strong opposition by some Pietralata residents, who argued it would be built on an area intended for a public park and too close to a hospital. However, in February 2026, the Rome City Council approved the stadium's Technical and Economic Feasibility Project (PFTE) feasibility study, which was submitted in December 2025.

According to the PFTE study, the stadium project will now encompass a total area of 27 hectares: 11.6 hectares will be designated for a public green spaces (including 6.9 hectares for a public park) and 3.5 hectares for plazas and pedestrian walkways, resulting in nearly 15 hectares of public space. The club plans to build a 1,600-square-metre club museum, a 1,800-square-metre club store, incorporate 30 retail outlets, a 245-square-metre bar, and include 21,000 square metres for hospitality events and conferences. The stadium complex itself is set to span 6.7 hectares. Following approval of the PFTE, the stadium project will be submitted to the single regional authorisation procedure, including the environmental impact assessment and the decision-making Conference of Services, with the targeted goal to have the stadium completed by 2030 and selected to host UEFA Euro 2032. Following approval by the municipal government in September 2026, construction on the stadium is set to begin in spring 2027 and finish by 2029, at the earliest.
