= Saitama Super Arena =

Multi-purpose indoor arena in Saitama, Japan

Coordinates: 35°53′42″N 139°37′51″E

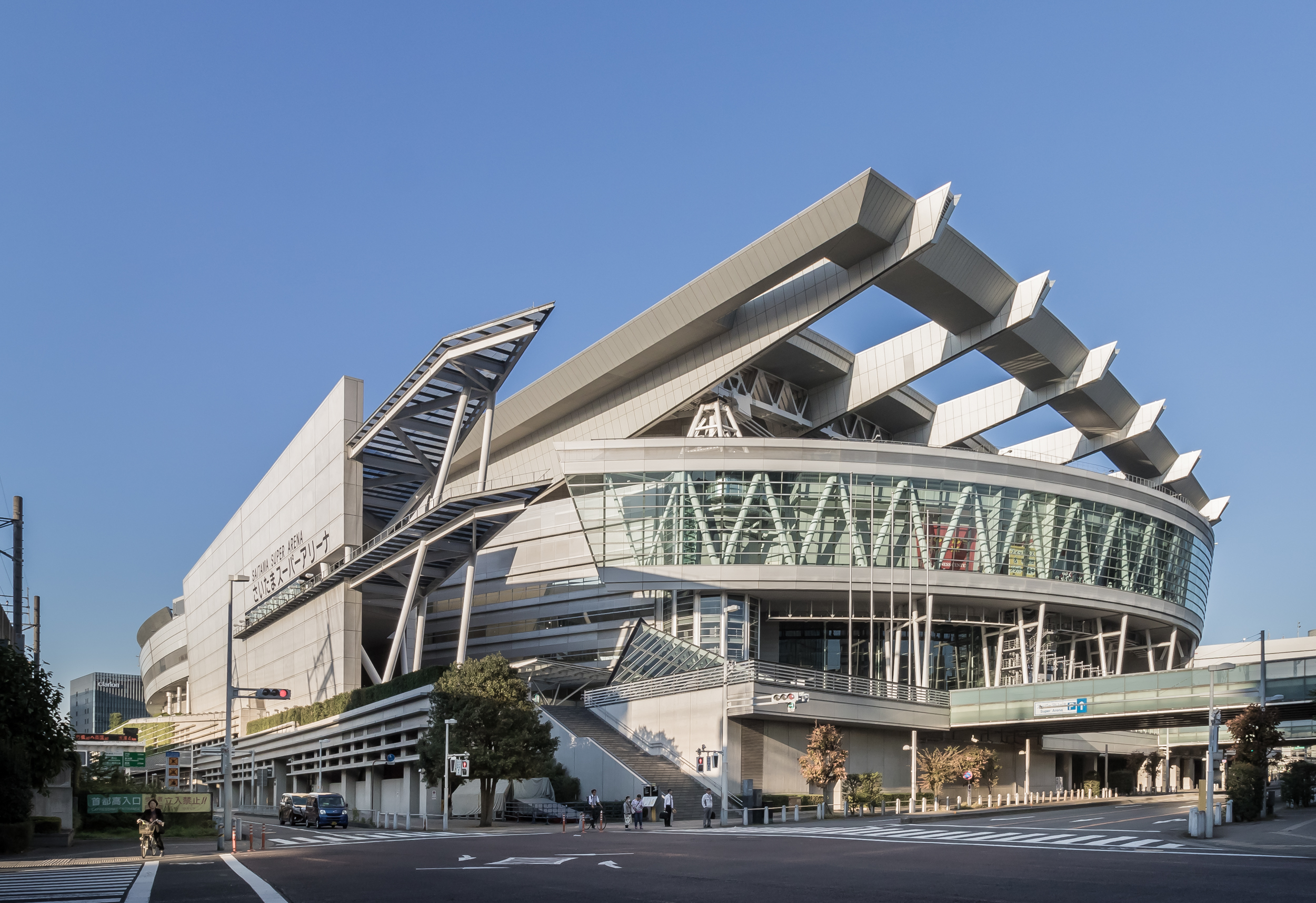
- Interactive map of Saitama Super Arena
- Former names: Saitama Super Arena (2000–2026)
- Location: 8 Shintoshin, Chūō-ku, Saitama, Saitama, Japan
- Owner: Saitama Arena Corp.
- Capacity: 36,500 (maximum capacity); 27,000 (stadium setting); 22,500 (arena setting)
- Public transit: JR East: Saitama-Shintoshin ■ Takasaki Line ■ Utsunomiya Line ■ Keihin-Tōhoku Line; Kita-Yono ■ Saikyō Line

Construction
- Opened: September 1, 2000; 26 years ago
- Cost: YEN ¥ 20 billion USD $ 195 million EUR € 142 million
- Architects: Dan Meis; Ellerbe Becket

Saitama Super Arena (さいたまスーパーアリーナ, Saitama Sūpā Arīna), currently known as GMO Arena (GMOアリーナ, GMO Arīna) for sponsorship reasons, is a multi-purpose indoor arena located in Chūō-ku, Saitama, Saitama Prefecture, Japan. It opened preliminarily on May 5, 2000, and then was officially opened on September 1 of the same year. Its maximum capacity is 36,500. The main arena capacity is between 19,000 and 22,500.

The arena was designed by Dan Meis, who at the time was working for architecture firm Ellerbe Becket, together with Nikken Sekkei. Meis's design was selected as a result of an international design competition. The arena features a gigantic movable section of seating which can reduce capacity for smaller events and create a more intimate setting.

It is a favorite venue for puroresu (Japanese professional wrestling) and mixed martial arts (MMA). It has also hosted other sports events such as boxing, basketball, volleyball, tennis, ice hockey, and gymnastics. It is the only Japanese arena equipped especially for American football.

It formerly housed the John Lennon Museum, which displayed John Lennon memorabilia and closed in 2010.

The arena has undergone two renovations: the first one beginning on December 1, 2015, and the second one beginning on January 13, 2026.

== Events ==
=== Combat sports & entertainment ===
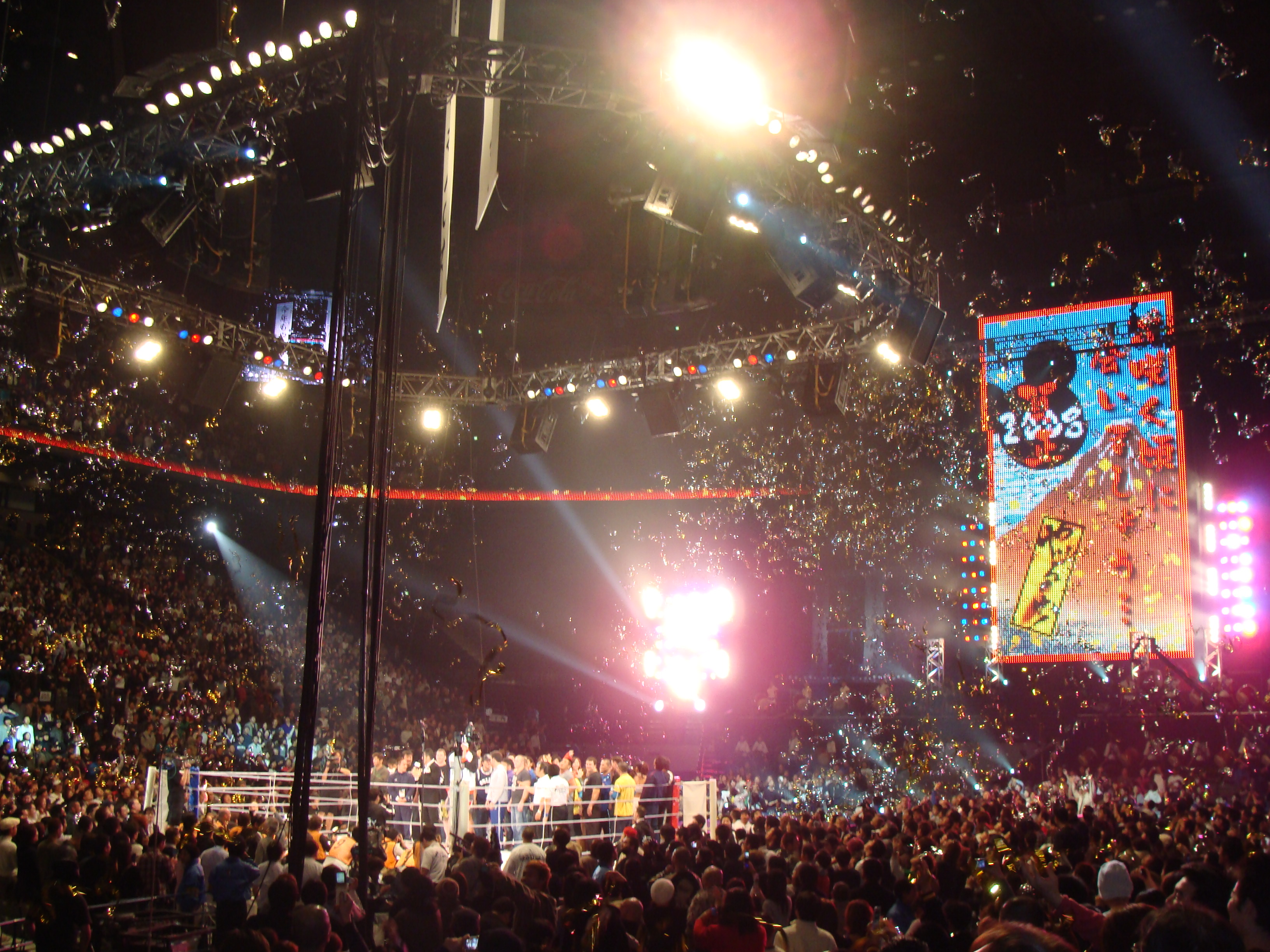
With an MMA event – Yarennoka! – December 2007

==== New Year's Eve events ====
The arena has hosted a major martial arts event on New Year's Eve since 2001.

- Pride Fighting Championships held events in the arena from 2003 to 2006.
- Yarennoka, an event organized by the former staff members of Pride, took place in 2007.
- Dynamite!! 2008 featured Dream and K-1 fights
- Dynamite!! 2009 featured fights by Dream, Sengoku and K-1
- Dynamite!! 2010 featured Dream and K-1 fights.
- Fight For Japan: Genki Desu Ka Omisoka 2011 featured fights by Dream, K-1 and IGF.
- GLORY Sports International presents Dream 18 & Glory 4 Tokyo ~ Special 2012 ~ New Year's Eve featured Dream and Glory fights.
- Beginning with its inaugural event, which took place on December 29 & 31, 2015, Rizin Fighting Federation has held events in the arena on New Year's Day every year.

==== Other events ====
The Saitama Super Arena hosted special tapings of WWE Raw, SmackDown, Heat, and Velocity that took place on February 4 and February 5, 2005, and was later broadcast on February 7 and February 10, 2005. The event is famously remembered for the "Kimono Match" that took place between Torrie Wilson and Hiroko Suzuki (a Japanese native who would later be elected to the Funabashi city council as part of a political career). Hiroko was defeated after losing her kimono, being stripped down to her bra and panties at the hands of Torrie.

On November 29, 2009, the arena hosted one of the biggest fights in Japan's history, with WBC Flyweight Champion Daisuke Naito defending his title against Koki Kameda.

The arena hosted the Japanese return of the Ultimate Fighting Championship on February 26, 2012, for UFC 144. Other UFC events held in the arena include UFC on Fuel TV: Silva vs. Stann on March 3, 2013, UFC Fight Night: Hunt vs. Nelson on September 20, 2014, as well as UFC Fight Night: Barnett vs. Nelson on September 26, 2015.

On November 7, 2019, Japanese bantamweight boxer Naoya Inoue defeated Nonito Donaire at the arena to claim the 2018–19 World Boxing Super Series.

On December 29, 2019, the arena hosted Bellator 237.

On June 7, 2022, Naoya Inoue defeated Nonito Donaire in a bantamweight unification bout.

On November 4 and 5, 2023, two-time Olympic champion Yuzuru Hanyu returned to the arena where he had won his first World Figure Skating Championships for his Repray Tour, the first solo ice show tour to be produced in figure skating.. On December 7, 9, and 11, Hanyu performed his second solo tour "Echoes of Life." The three days were sold out and the premier coincided with the celebration of Hanyu's 30th birthday.

=== Other sports ===
It is one of two home arenas of the Saitama Broncos basketball team.

In 2000, the arena hosted two NHL hockey games between the Nashville Predators and the Pittsburgh Penguins.

In 2003, NBA basketball teams Seattle SuperSonics and the Los Angeles Clippers, played two regular season games. In 2006, the arena hosted the knockout stage of the Basketball World Championship 2006. In 2019, the Houston Rockets and Toronto Raptors played two preseason games at the arena. In 2022, the arena again hosted two NBA preseason games, this time between the Golden State Warriors and Washington Wizards.

The 2014, 2019 and 2023 World Figure Skating Championships were held at the venue.

On New Year's Eve 2018, the arena hosted the exhibition boxing match between former five-division boxing world champion Floyd Mayweather Jr. and kickboxer Tenshin Nasukawa.

The arena hosted basketball competitions at 2020 Summer Olympics hosted by Tokyo.

=== Music ===
Many music events have been held at the venue, including Music Station, Hey! Hey! Hey! Music Champ, Animelo Summer Live, WIRE, and 'Dream Power' concerts organized by Yoko Ono. Various notable Japanese music acts have performed at the arena, including =Love, Ado, AKB48, Alexandros, Namie Amuro, B'z, Babymetal, Berryz Kobo, Bump of Chicken, Minori Chihara, fripSide, Masaharu Fukuyama, Gackt, The Gazette, Gen Hoshino, Glay, Ayumi Hamasaki, Tomoyasu Hotei, Janne Da Arc, Kamen Joshi, Mai Kuraki, MAN WITH A MISSION, L'Arc-en-Ciel, LiSA, Luna Sea, Hatsune Miku, Nana Mizuki, Momoiro Clover Z, Morning Musume, Mr. Children, Nightmare, Kana Nishino, Nogizaka46, One Ok Rock, Pierrot, PORNOGRAFFITTI, Radwimps, Maaya Sakamoto, Scandal, Ringo Sheena, Siam Shade, Sid, Hoshimachi Suisei, Sound Horizon, Spyair, XG, Hikaru Utada, Vamps, Ling Tosite Sigure, Aimer, YOASOBI, and &Team.

Some anime projects like Uta no Prince-sama, Love Live!, K-On!, The Idolmaster, and Touken Ranbu have featured in live performances at the arena.

Many international artists have performed at the venue, including Helloween, The Black Eyed Peas, Mariah Carey, Madonna, Janet Jackson, Whitney Houston, Guns N' Roses, Beyoncé, Linkin Park, Coldplay, Lady Gaga, Avril Lavigne, Backstreet Boys, Muse, DragonForce, Metallica, Radiohead, AC/DC, Jeff Mills, Taylor Swift, U2, Iron Maiden, One Direction, Katy Perry, Avenged Sevenfold, Dua Lipa and K-pop acts BoA, TVXQ, Super Junior, BTS, SS501, Girls' Generation, Kara, Apink, Big Bang, 2PM, F.T. Island, 2NE1, Shinee, ATEEZ, CNBLUE, Seventeen, Kim Jae-joong, Exo, Twice, NCT 127, Stray Kids, I-dle, Iz*One, Treasure, and J-Hope. Queen + Paul Rodgers performed there, with the concerts being recorded in the concert DVD Super Live in Japan. Green Day taped the show for their new live album titled Awesome as Fuck. David Coverdale's band Whitesnake, while performing at the Loud Park Festival, recorded their performance for their live album Made in Japan.

== Gallery ==
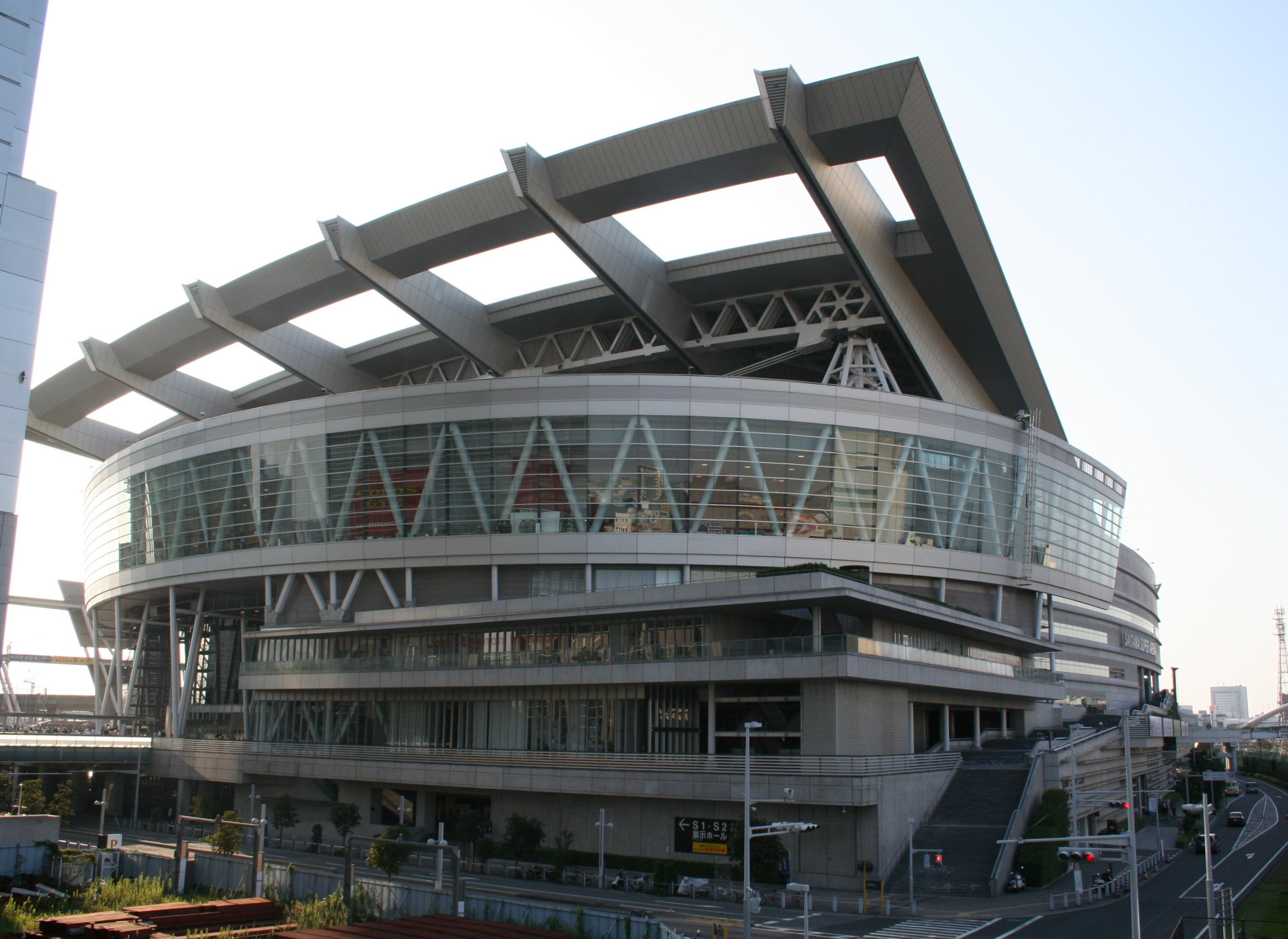
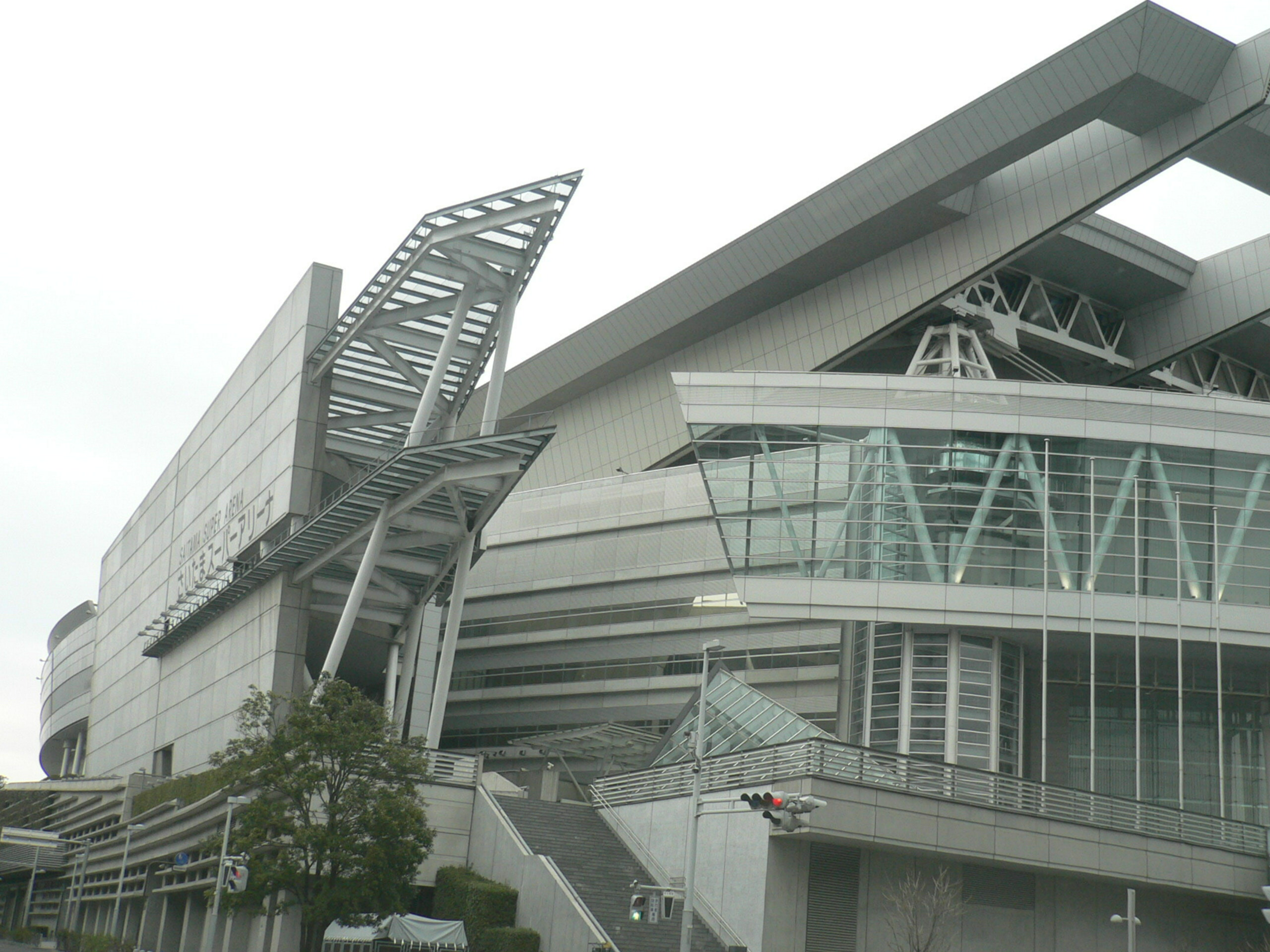
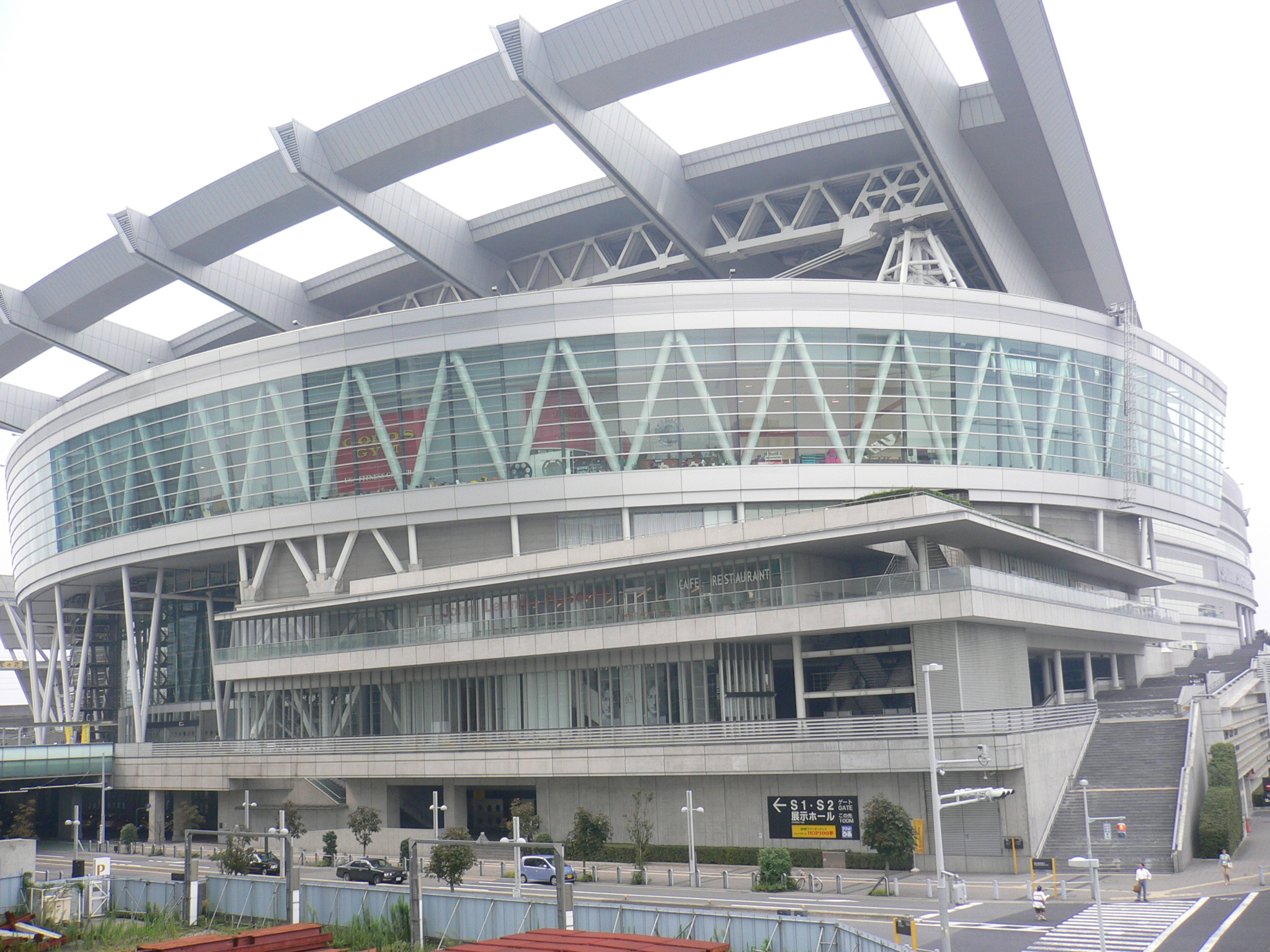
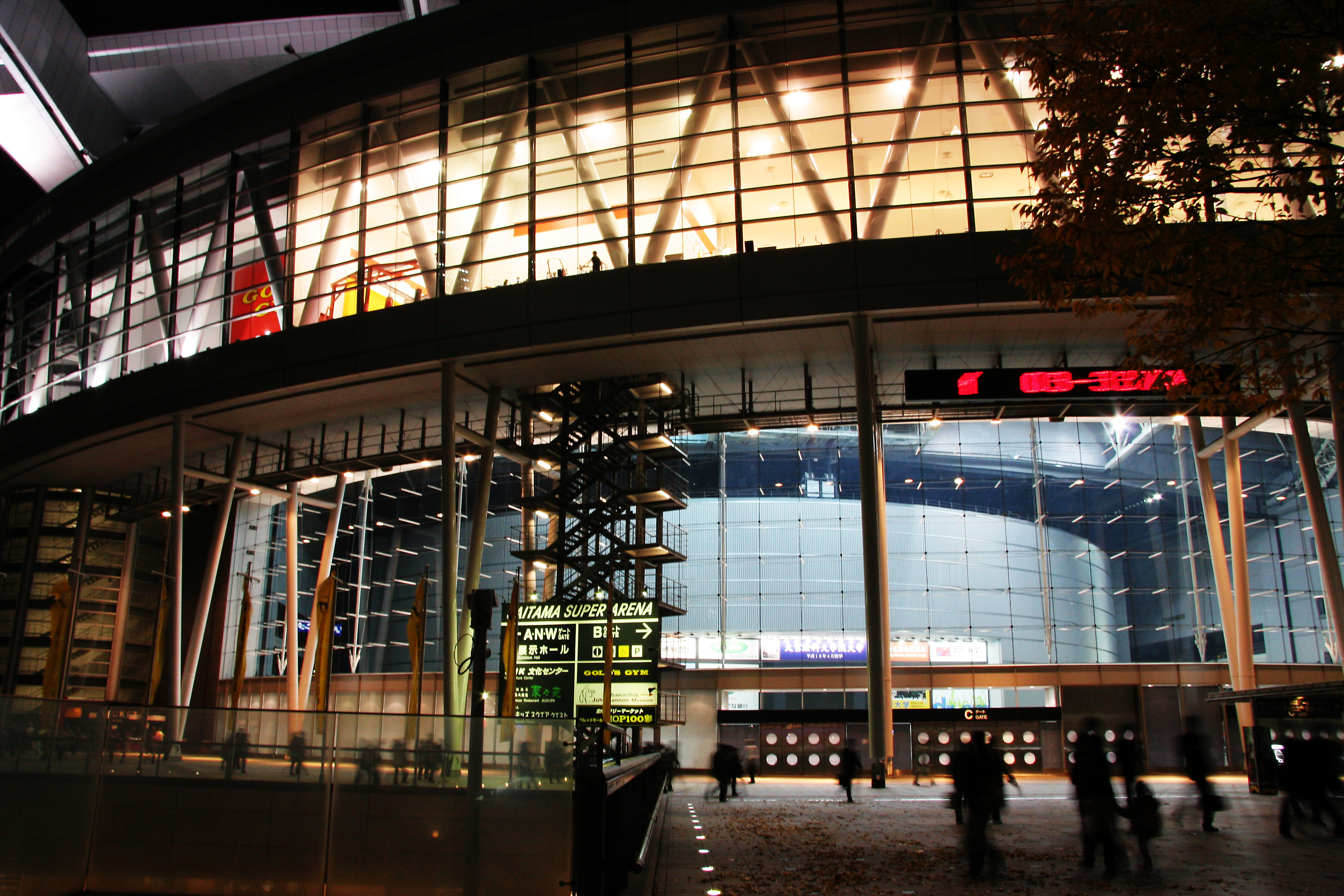

== See also ==
- Plenitude Arena, a venue near Paris similar in concept to the Super Arena
- List of indoor arenas in Japan

Preceded by Conseco Fieldhouse; Indianapolis	FIBA World Cup; Final Venue; 2006	Succeeded by Sinan Erdem Dome; Istanbul
