= Dan Meis =

American architect (born 1961)

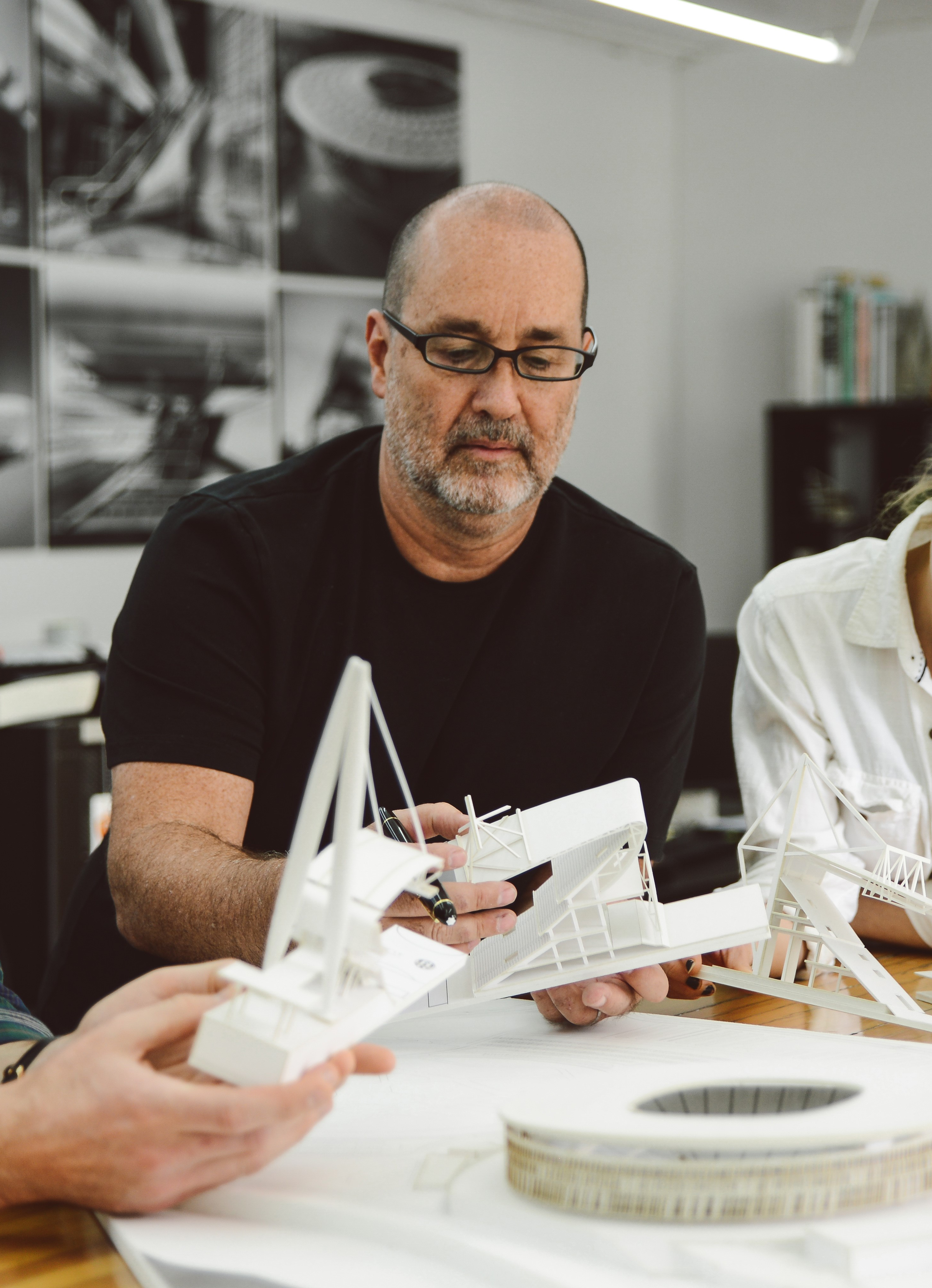
- Born: 1961 (age 64–65); Windsor, Colorado, U.S.
- Education: University of Colorado Boulder; University of Illinois at Chicago
- Occupation: Architect
- Awards: American Institute of Architects fellowship
- Practice: MEIS Architects
- Projects: proposed Los Angeles NFL Stadium; Safeco Field (Seattle, Washington); Manchester Arena (Manchester, England); Saitama Super Arena (Saitama, Japan); Stadio della Roma (Rome, Italy); Everton Stadium (Liverpool, England

Dan Meis, FAIA, RIBA (born 1961) is an American architect known for designing sports and entertainment facilities including Staples Center, Safeco Field, Paycor Stadium, Saitama Super Arena, Stadio Della Roma, and Everton FC's Hill Dickinson Stadium.

== Career ==
Meis began his career in Chicago under the mentorship of architect Helmut Jahn. He later co-founded the sports and entertainment practice of NBBJ before establishing his own firm, MEIS Architects, in 2007. It has offices in New York City and Los Angeles, California.

His firm has recently formed a partnership with Maria Sharapova to build tennis, fitness, and wellness centers. MEIS is also working with entertainment giant Live Nation to design venue upgrades across a portfolio of outdoor amphitheaters.

His design for AS Roma's Stadio Della Roma includes football's tightly organized seating bowls. The stadium is wrapped in a floating stone "scrim", which is intended to evoke the Colosseum. Currently under construction, the new MEIS designed MLS stadium for FC Cincinnati, located in Cincinnati's West End neighborhood, will have an estimated seating capacity of 26,000 to 26,500.

While at Ellerbe Becket in the 1990s, Meis designed the indoor arena Nynex Arena (now Manchester Arena) in Manchester, England, and led the design competition that won the $750 million Saitama Super Arena in Japan. Meis then left Ellerbe Becket to join NBBJ, establishing NBBJ's sports division with Michael Hallmark and Ron Turner. Meis designed the Staples Center in Los Angeles, the Dodge Theater (now Comerica Theatre) in Phoenix, Miller Park in Milwaukee, Safeco Field in Seattle, Lincoln Financial Field in Philadelphia, and Paul Brown Stadium in Cincinnati, which was the first NFL facility to win an AIA design award.

== Awards ==
Meis's design for Los Angeles's Staples Center has been stated as the "greatest arena ever built", and in 2001, he appeared in Time magazine as one of their "100 Innovators in the World of Sports". Meis's work has twice been awarded the Business Week/Architectural Record Award, and he is the only architect twice recognized as one of Sports Business Journal's "40 under 40 Most Influential Sports Executives".

In 2007, Meis was elevated to the College of the Fellows of the American Institute of Architects.

== Education ==
Meis studied environmental design and engineering at the University of Colorado in Boulder, and later received a Bachelor of Architecture from the University of Illinois at Chicago.

Since 2011, Meis has served as an adjunct professor for stadium design at the University of Southern California.

== Project designs ==
=== Sport projects ===
- Everton FC's Hill Dickinson Stadium
- FC Cincinnati Stadium
- Stadio Della Roma
- Staples Center Suite Upgrades
- Paul Brown Stadium Enhancements
- StubHub Center Enhancements
- Clippers Courtside Club
- proposed Los Angeles NFL Stadium
- Sports City Stadium
- Staples Center
- Santa Anita Park
- USTA National Tennis Center
- Miller Park
- Paul Brown Stadium
- Safeco Field
- Saitama Super Arena
- Lincoln Financial Field
- Mazda Stadium
- Dodger Stadium Renovation
- LA Coliseum Renovation
- Sacramento Entertainment & Sports Center
- Madison Square Garden Renovations
- Columbus Crew Stadium
- Qwest Convention Center and Arena
- The Dodge Theater
- RFK Stadium Renovation
- Washington DC NFL Stadium
- The Meadowlands Renovation
- Dalian Soccer Stadium
- @Bahrain Master Plan and Auto Club
- Thunderbay Motor Speedway
- Qualcomm Stadium Renovation
- Beijing Olympic Master Plan
- Asia World Exhibition Center
- LG Twins Seoul Dome
- Guangdong Olympic Stadium
- Dalian Sports Center
- Cintas Center at Xavier University
- Al McGuire Center at Marquette University
- University of Nevada-Las Vegas Thomas & Mack Center

=== Commercial projects ===
- Los Angeles Clippers Corporate Headquarters
- Kun Ming Towers
- China Air Headquarters
- Peterson Automotive Museum
- DTS World Headquarters
- Herald Square
- One Chase Manhattan
- Doha Towers
- Santa Clara HERO Site
- Shenbei Live! Entertainment District
- Doha Al Jassim Hotel
- Pelican Lakes
- Pizzeria Mozza
- The Garage
