= Tor di Valle Racecourse =

Hippodrome of Tor di Valle
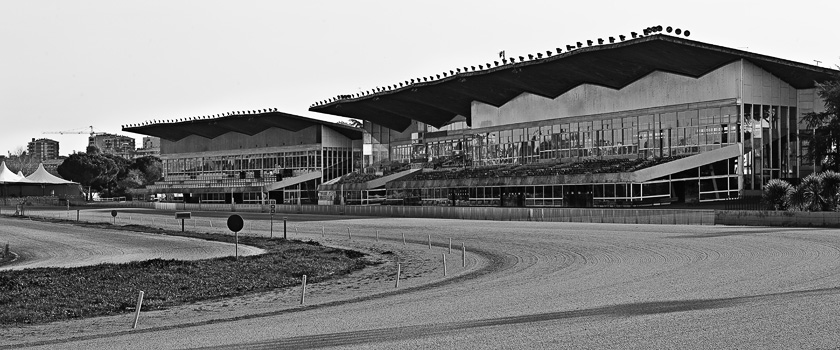
- The tribunes
- Click on the map for a fullscreen view

General information
- Location: Rome
- Coordinates: 41.82°N 12.43°E

Hippodrome of Tor di Valle (Italian: Ippodromo Tor di Valle) was an important horse racing venue in the city of Rome. The hippodrome took its name from the area in which it was located and included a racetrack, a training track and a right track. It was one of the biggest of its kind in Europe.

Because of its size it often became a location for cultural, musical and social events in the city.

The hippodrome was closed in 2013 after an agreement that the new stadium of AS Roma and a business park with skyscrapers by Daniel Libeskind will be built on its place.

However, on 26 February 2021, it was announced that the project in the Tor di Valle area was halted indefinitely.
