= Tom Anselmi =

Canadian sports executive

President of Business Operations & Chief Operating Officer of The Edmonton Oilers

Personal details
- Born: 1956 (age 69–70) Etobicoke, Ontario, Canada
- Education: Ryerson Polytechnical Institute and University of Saskatchewan

Tom Anselmi (born c. 1956) is a Canadian sports executive. He is currently employed by the OEG (Oilers Entertainment Group) serving as the President of Business Operations and Chief Operating Officer. He had previously served as a Business Manager with the Ottawa Senators and as the President and Chief operating officer for Maple Leaf Sports & Entertainment from 2011 to 2013. Anselmi is an alumnus of Ryerson Polytechnical Institute and University of Saskatchewan.

== Career ==
=== Early career ===
Anselmi started his sports career in 1987 and helped to develop the SkyDome in Toronto.

Anselmi served as Vice President, General Manager of Arena Operations at Orca Bay Sports and Entertainment in Vancouver.

=== MLSE ===
Anselmi had a 17-year career at Maple Leaf Sports & Entertainment; a corporation that owns Toronto FC, Toronto Maple Leafs, Toronto Raptors and Toronto Marlies. Anselmi was with the company between December 1, 1996 and 13 September 2013. and he was promoted to Chief Operating Officer of MLSE in 1999, and Executive Vice-President and COO in 2004.

Anselmi was named President of MLSE after an eight-month search, while also continuing to hold his position of COO. However, Anselmi did not receive the title of CEO position that he sought when he was promoted.

Anselmi's tenure as President ended on June 30, 2013, when Tim Leiweke was hired as President and CEO of MLSE, though Anselmi still retained the title of COO. Anselmi kept his office as COO when Leiweke reshuffled the senior management team on July 24, 2013.

Anselmi resigned from MLSE on September 13, 2013. Anselmi's position had been weakened since he was the top executive in charge of Toronto F.C., which despite being successful financially, had never made the MLS playoffs.

Reputation

Anselmi is "well noted" for his arena, real estate and broadcast projects since joining the company in 1996. MLSE Chairman Larry Tanenbaum stated "Tom's proven strength in operations has made him a respected leader here at MLSE and across the sports and entertainment industry." He was credited with having the Air Canada Centre completed on budget and on time. He was also known as a "down-to-earth operator who preferred blue jeans to suits and favoured snowmobiling over more rarefied pursuits".

=== Ottawa Senators ===
On January 25, 2017, Anselmi joined the Ottawa Senators organization. The Senators won the right in 2016 to build a new arena on federal land in downtown Ottawa, and one of Anselmi's highest priorities was to oversee the negotiations and the construction of the new arena. Anselmi submitted his resignation to the Senators in early January 2018, and the club announced his departure February 9, 2018.

== Personal life ==
Anselmi was born in Etobicoke, Ontario. Originally an engineer, Anselmi studied landscape architecture at Ryerson University (now Toronto Metropolitan University) and engineering at the University of Saskatchewan. Anselmi helped build the Rogers Centre and Rogers Arena. In 2011, Anselmi received the Chief of Defence Staff commendation; the highest military honour a civilian can receive.

He is a member of the board of directors of Covenant House, and Canada's Walk Of Fame. Previously, he was a Vice-Chair of the Toronto Board of Trade.

Preceded by	Chief Operating Officer of MLSE; 1999 – September 6, 2013	Succeeded by

Preceded by Richard Peddie	President of MLSE; September 4, 2012 – June 30, 2013	Succeeded by Tim Leiweke
