= Hill Dickinson Stadium =

Football stadium in Liverpool, England

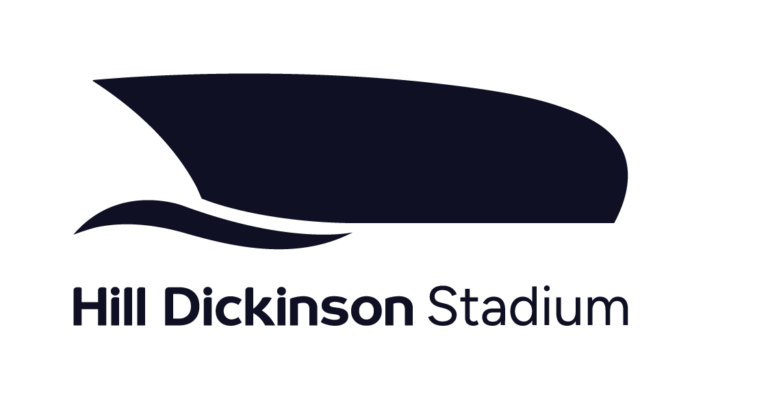

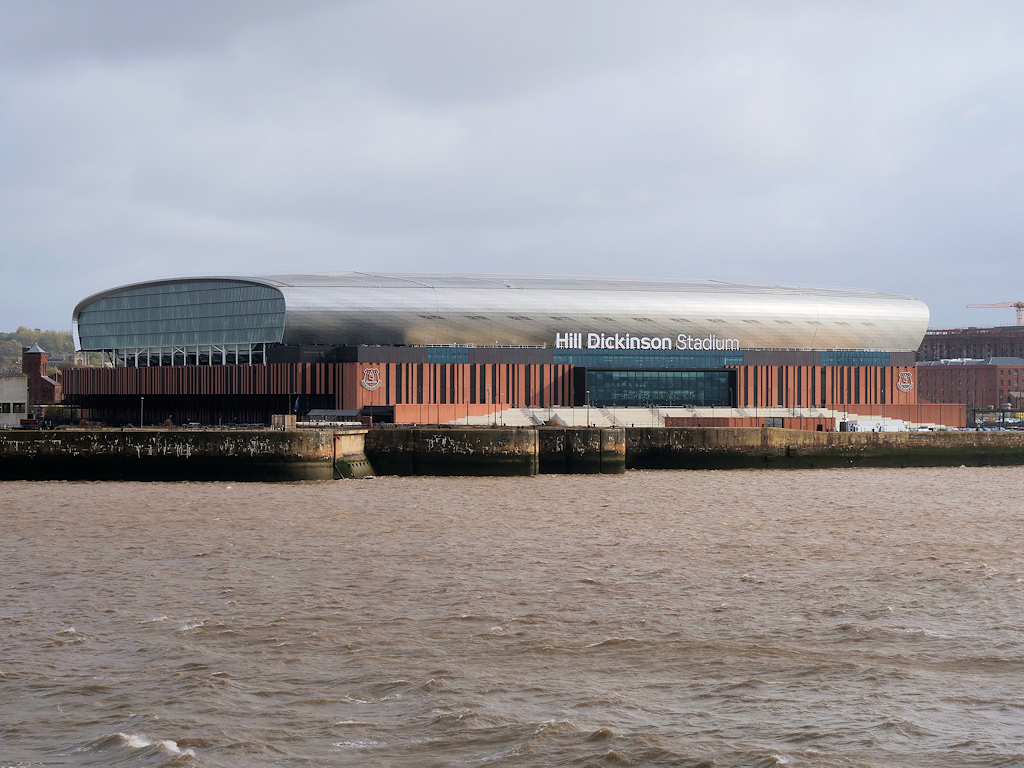
- UEFA
- Interactive map of Hill Dickinson Stadium
- Full name: Hill Dickinson Stadium
- Location: Bramley-Moore Dock, Vauxhall, Liverpool
- Coordinates: 53.4251°N 3.0028°W
- Owner: Everton
- Operator: Everton
- Capacity: 52,769
- Record attendance: 52,590 (Everton v Sunderland, 17th May 2026)
- Field size: 105 by 68 metres (115 by 74 yards)
- Public transit: Sandhills

Construction
- Groundbreaking: 10 August 2021; 5 years ago
- Built: August 2021 – December 2021 (infill); January 2022 – December 2024 (main build)
- Opened: 17 February 2025; 21 months ago
- Cost: Estimated around £750 million
- Architects: MEIS Architects; BDP Pattern Architects
- Builder: Laing O'Rourke
- Project manager: Alix Waldron
- Structural engineer: Buro Happold

Tenant
- Everton (2025–present)

Website
- hilldickinsonstadium.com

Hill Dickinson Stadium, known as Bramley-Moore Dock Stadium or Everton Stadium during construction and renamed for sponsorship reasons, is a football stadium at Bramley-Moore Dock in Vauxhall, Liverpool, England. It is the home ground of Premier League club Everton, replacing Goodison Park.

Bramley-Moore is a former commercial dock and it is intended that the new stadium will become the heart of a new mixed-use development in the area containing shops, housing, sport facilities and other venues. Upon opening, it became the eighth largest football stadium in England, and the eleventh largest stadium in Britain. The stadium will also be a host venue for UEFA Euro 2028 as well as host for one game in the 2026 Nations Championship and has already hosted the 2025 Rugby League Ashes.

== Planning and development ==
=== Proposals ===
Everton first played at Goodison Park in 1892 and it has been gradually updated since its construction, the most recent major development being the opening of a new stand in August 1994, which gave it an all-seater capacity of more than 39,000, but ultimately was constrained by its methods of construction and its location. In 2007, then-CEO Keith Wyness revealed that the club had spent £500,000 on repairs just to keep the steelwork of the ground up to standard, and there was a serious possibility that within ten years it may not pass safety inspections. The Taylor Report in 1990 required that all stadia in the Football League in Britain become all-seater, which severely curtailed Goodison Park's capacity, which had peaked at more than 78,000, to just over 39,000, and then further to its current capacity of 39,414. This lags behind nearby Anfield, which was expanded to over 61,000.

The possibility of a move to a new stadium was first mentioned around 1996, when then chairman Peter Johnson announced plans to move Everton from Goodison Park to a new 60,000-seater stadium at a different site. By 2001, a site at King's Dock had been identified as the location for a new 55,000-seater stadium, scheduled for completion around 2005, but these plans were abandoned due to funding difficulties.

Everton entered into talks with the Knowsley Council and Tesco in June 2006 over the possibility of building a new 55,000-seat stadium, expandable to over 60,000, in Kirkby. The plan became known as The Kirkby Project. The club took the unusual move of giving its supporters a say in the club's future by holding a ballot on the proposal with the results being in favour of it, 59% to 41%. Opponents of the plan included other local councils concerned by the effect of a large Tesco store being built as part of the development and a group of fans demanding that Everton should remain within the city boundaries of Liverpool. Following a public inquiry into the project, the central government rejected the proposal. Local and regional politicians attempted to put together an amended rescue plan with the Liverpool City Council calling a meeting with Everton F.C. The plan was to assess some suitable sites shortlisted within the city boundary. However, the amended plan was also not successful.

Everton enquired into the possibility of co-financing Liverpool's Stanley Park Stadium, a proposed plan for a stadium that was scheduled to open in 2006, but the plan was cancelled in 2012 after new owners favoured the expansion of Anfield. This idea was denied by Liverpool's former co-owner Tom Hicks. There was speculation at the time over a joint stadium project between the two clubs but despite these rumours, Liverpool maintained that a ground-sharing agreement was never on the agenda.

The Liverpool City Council Regeneration and Transport Select Committee meeting on 10 February 2011 featured a proposal to open the Bootle Branch line to passenger traffic using "Liverpool Football Club and Everton Football Club as priorities, as economic enablers of the project". This proposal would place both football clubs on a rapid transit Merseyrail line that would circle the city and ease transport access. In September 2014 the club, working with the Liverpool City Council and Liverpool Mutual Homes, outlined initial plans to build a new stadium in Walton Hall Park. However, those plans were later scrapped in May 2016 with the prospect of two new sites being identified for the club. At the Annual General Meeting in January 2017, the chairman, Bill Kenwright, revealed that Bramley-Moore Dock was the preferred site for the new stadium, with a new railway station and a new road being funded by the City Council. This was contingent on setting up a Special Purpose Vehicle with Liverpool Council, who would act as guarantors for the hundreds of millions in commercial loans the club planned to use to finance the construction.

The choice of the Bramley-Moore Dock site was endorsed in a public consultation exercise conducted in 2018, but was met with stern criticism from UNESCO, which later removed Liverpool from its list of World Heritage Sites. Architect Dan Meis has been charged with designing a new stadium for Everton, followed by a second stage of consultation, called The People's Project.

In November 2017, the club agreed to a lease with Peel Holdings lasting 200 years, and in 2018 revealed its plans for a 52,000-seat stadium.

=== Funding ===
On 23 March 2017, it was announced that a deal had been agreed between Liverpool City Council, Everton and Peel Holdings to acquire the dock for a new football stadium.

On 31 March 2017, Liverpool City Council voted in favour of creating a Special Purpose Vehicle company. The company was proposed with securing the funds for the stadium. The lenders would acquire a 200-year head-lease of the land from Peel, the landowners, and leasing the stadium to the SPV, which would in turn sub-lease to Everton for 40 years.

The current funding model now proposed before Liverpool City Council (revealed at Everton's AGM on 9 January 2018) would be an arrangement that will see the council borrow £280m at ultra-low interest rates from the government, and then pass that loan on to the club at a profit to the city of around £7m a year over 25 years. Costs for the new stadium now escalating to an estimated £500m, would mean the club would still require to find the remaining £220m. As of June 2018 the council funding was still not in place, and doubts were raised by Mayor Anderson if this funding model would be agreed.

In July 2019, it was reported that the club had options to fund the development from both the private and public sectors, which could include selling naming rights to a sponsor.

In January 2020, it was announced that Everton have agreed a naming right deal worth £30 million with USM, who already sponsored Everton's training ground, Finch Farm.

The club further announced that it would enlist the help of major international banks JP Morgan and MUFG to help secure finance for the new stadium.

In March 2022, Everton announced they would no longer receive a loan from Liverpool City Council and had acquired alternative funding.

=== Features ===
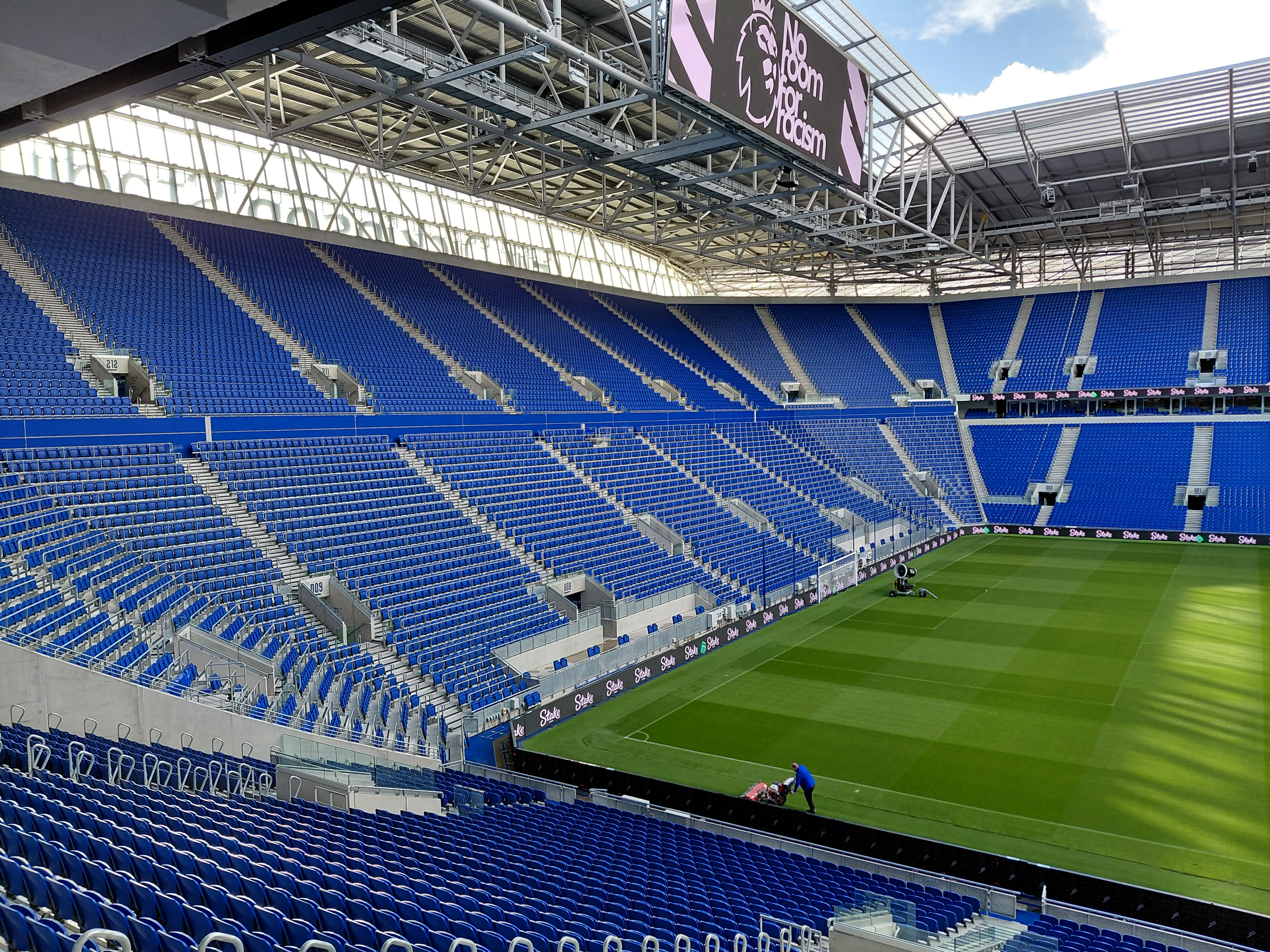
The South Stand at Hill Dickinson Stadium, Liverpool, Merseyside, UK

Everton's stadium is a bowl design with a capacity of 52,769 and constructed of steel and glass, with the existing dock being filled with reclaimed sand from the River Mersey.

Similar to the Tottenham Hotspur Stadium, there is a 13,000-seater stand which is reportedly inspired by the "Yellow Wall" at the Westfalenstadion, the stadium of Borussia Dortmund.

The stadium features an experience named 'ALL', designed to offer a wide choice of social spaces from pubs and bars and high-street style restaurants through to personal and fine-dining experiences. The Stadium features modern technology to elevate the fan experience including Self-Service 'EBars' and 'ThroughPass' which uses Amazon 'Just Walk Out' technology

In June 2025, Everton announced a partnership with ticketing firm Seat Unique. Fans will be able to purchase match-by-match access to 'lounge seating', which includes cinema-style chairs and private TV monitors to see replays.

The stadium capacity was reduced to 52,769 after a review on seat configuration before officially opening. Factors such as segregation lines between the home and away section and the compliance and provision for media facilities and camera positions have played a part in the original maximum capacity being reduced by 0.2% (119 seats).

=== Construction ===
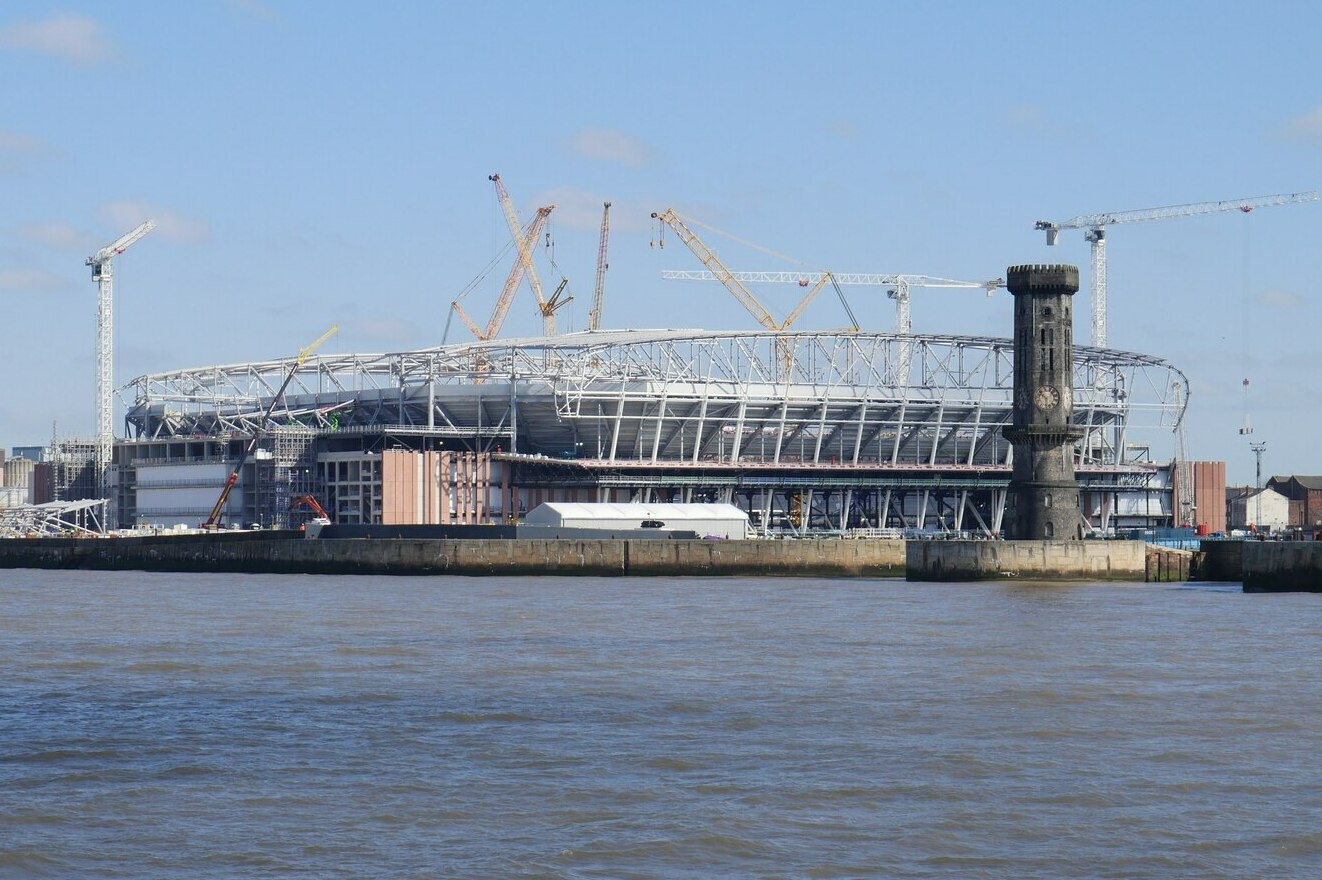
Everton Stadium under construction in April 2023 with the Victoria Tower, a clock-tower for shipping, to the right of the picture

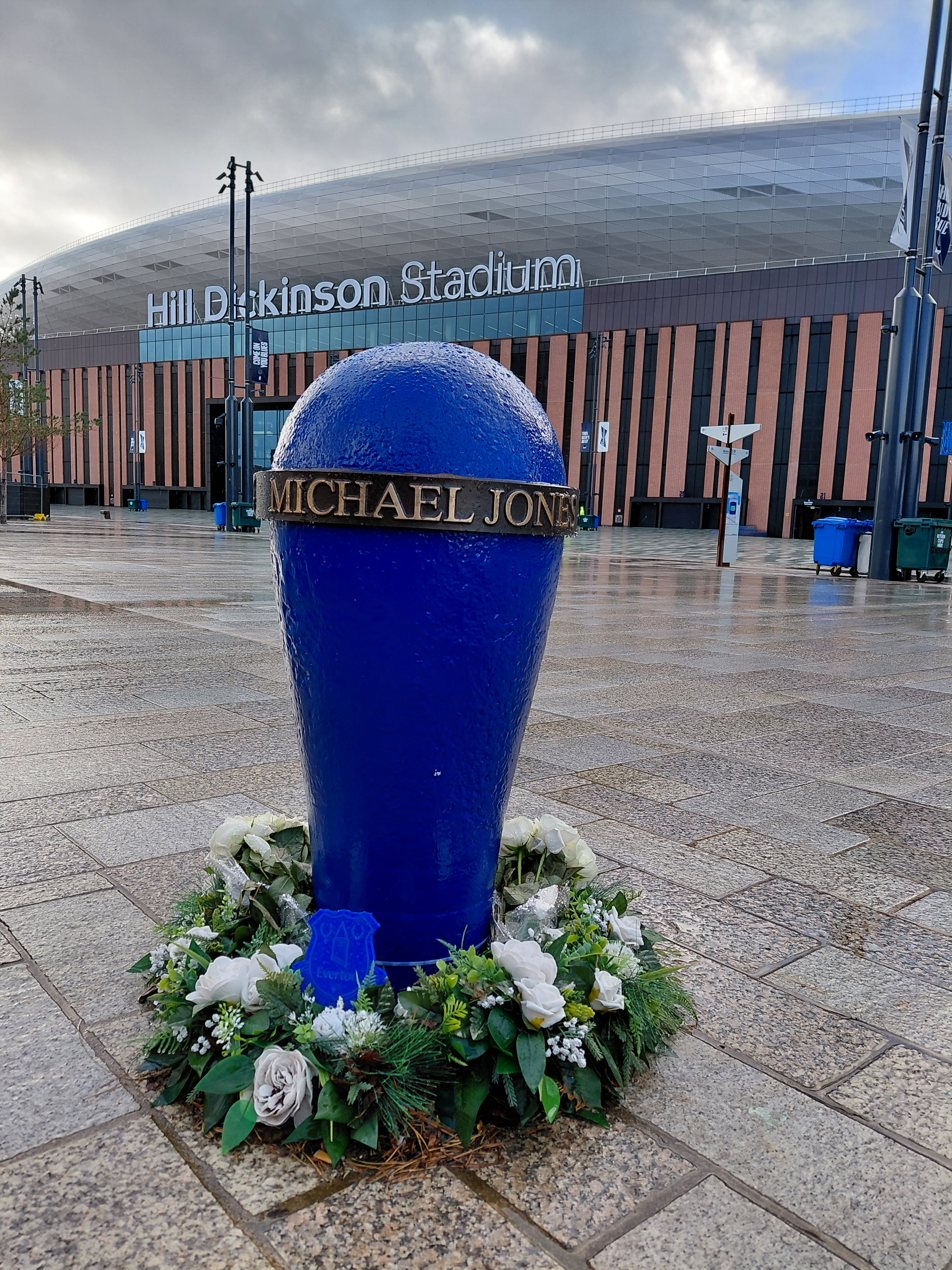
Memorial to Michael Jones at Hill Dickinson Stadium, Liverpool, Merseyside, UK

Initially delayed by Covid lockdowns, construction by main contractor Laing O'Rourke finally began in July 2021. By early 2022, non-listed structures had been demolished, heritage assets had been removed and preserved, the dock basin had been repaired and infilled, foundations were laid and the concrete structures of the four corners of the new stadium had been started. The stadium's superstructure was pieced together using Design for Manufacture and Assembly (DfMA) techniques, with all steelwork and precast concrete manufactured in advance, off-site, under factory conditions before arriving on site in a pre-determined order and slotted together utilising 3D modelling.

In August 2023, work was temporarily halted after a fatal accident on site; Michael Jones, a lifelong Everton fan from Kirkby, who was working for a subcontractor, suffered severe head injuries and was later declared dead at Aintree University Hospital. In August 2024, a permanent memorial to Jones was unveiled outside the stadium.

The stadium was declared structurally complete after the final concrete terracing panel was installed in February 2024. In March 2024, Alucraft Systems, a subcontractor supplying cladding panels for the stadium's exterior, went into administration owing suppliers £7.7 million.

The completed stadium was officially handed over by the contractor in December 2024.

=== Loss of UNESCO World Heritage Site Status ===
Bramley-Moore Dock was within the Liverpool Maritime Mercantile City, UNESCO World Heritage Site and has a number of heritage assets that are at risk or in disrepair, which Everton stated will be repaired and maintained.

Despite this, in 2021, UNESCO recommended that the City lose its status, with the development at Bramley-Moore Dock being one of the reasons, along with the longstanding development of the waterfront and the wider Liverpool Waters project. The heritage body said the stadium "would have a completely unacceptable major adverse impact on the authenticity, integrity and outstanding universal value of the World Heritage Site." The revocation of the world heritage site status was confirmed in July 2021.

== Opening ==
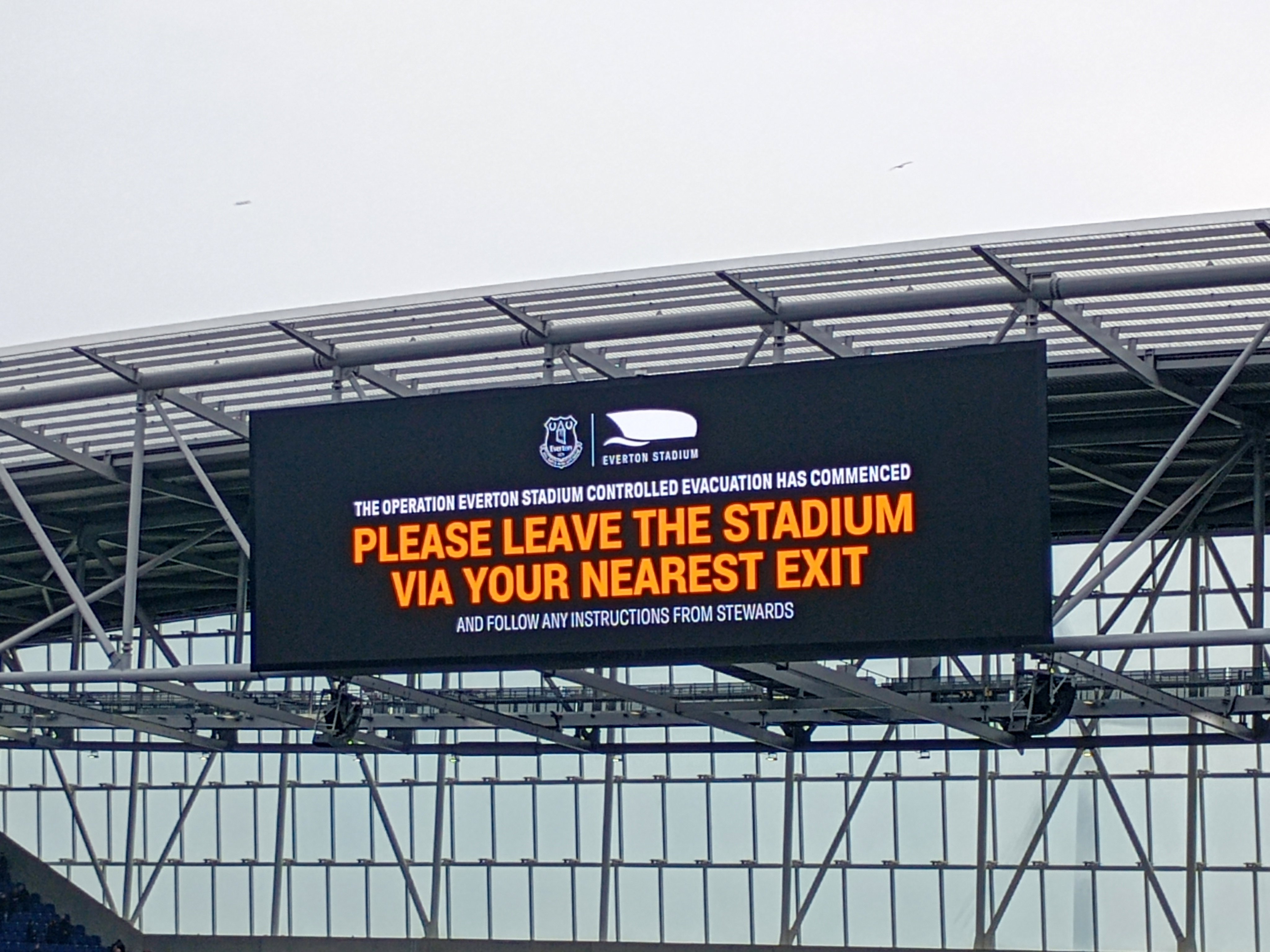
Evacuation testing during the 23 March certification game.

Three test events were scheduled in order to gain the necessary safety certificates and licences to host competitive matches. The first event, opened for 10,000 fans on 17 February 2025, saw Wigan U18s beating Everton U18 squad 2–1. Wigan's Harrison Rimmer, in the 12th minute of play, became the first ever player to score a goal at the stadium, before Wigan player Cole Simms scored a second to make the score 2–0 in the 17th minute. Everton's 16-year-old substitute Ray Robert then marked the inaugural goal for the home side in the 88th minute, as he converted a penalty.

The second event took place on 23 March, a friendly featuring Everton U21s. The game sold out at 25,000 a 1–0 victory over Bolton Wanderers B squad. The game was 65 minutes long due to a mandatory evacuation practice. After the game concerns were raised about public transport availability and traffic congestion before and post-match.

In July, a closed doors friendly was played by Everton vs Port Vale, outside the certification process.

The concluding certification test was held at a pre-season friendly against Roma, held on 9 August, a weekend before the start of the 2025–26 Premier League season. The match ended in a 0–1 loss for the home team, with Roma's Matías Soulé scoring in 70th minute. A sold-out attendance of 50,837 was recorded for the fixture.

On 24 August, the stadium hosted its first competitive match, a Premier League fixture between Everton and Brighton, which Everton won 2–0. The first confirmed attendance in the ground was 51,759, The inaugural goal and assist in a competitive fixture were captured by Evertonians Iliman Ndiaye and Jack Grealish, respectively, in the 23rd minute. Ndiaye had also capped off the 2024–25 Premier League season as the last men's senior player to score in a competitive match at Goodison Park. The game also saw Everton goalkeeper Jordan Pickford record the stadium's first penalty save, denying the attempt of Brighton forward Danny Welbeck in the 77th minute.

The stadium was received positively by journalists upon its debut. The Telegraph's Thom Gibbs complimented the new grounds, noting that "the interior is quite unique for this country, agreeably square and miraculously intimate for a 50k+ capacity. Crucially, despite many modern trappings, it feels like a football stadium, with flashy design secondary to the people filling the seats." Likewise, The Guardian's Aaron Sharp noted that while the experience of the new stadium was "a marked departure from the visceral experience of navigating entry to Goodison", the stadium maintained a positive atmosphere, and that "as kick-off approached, this roomy, comfortable feat of 21st-century design felt all of a sudden very familiar – old school, even."

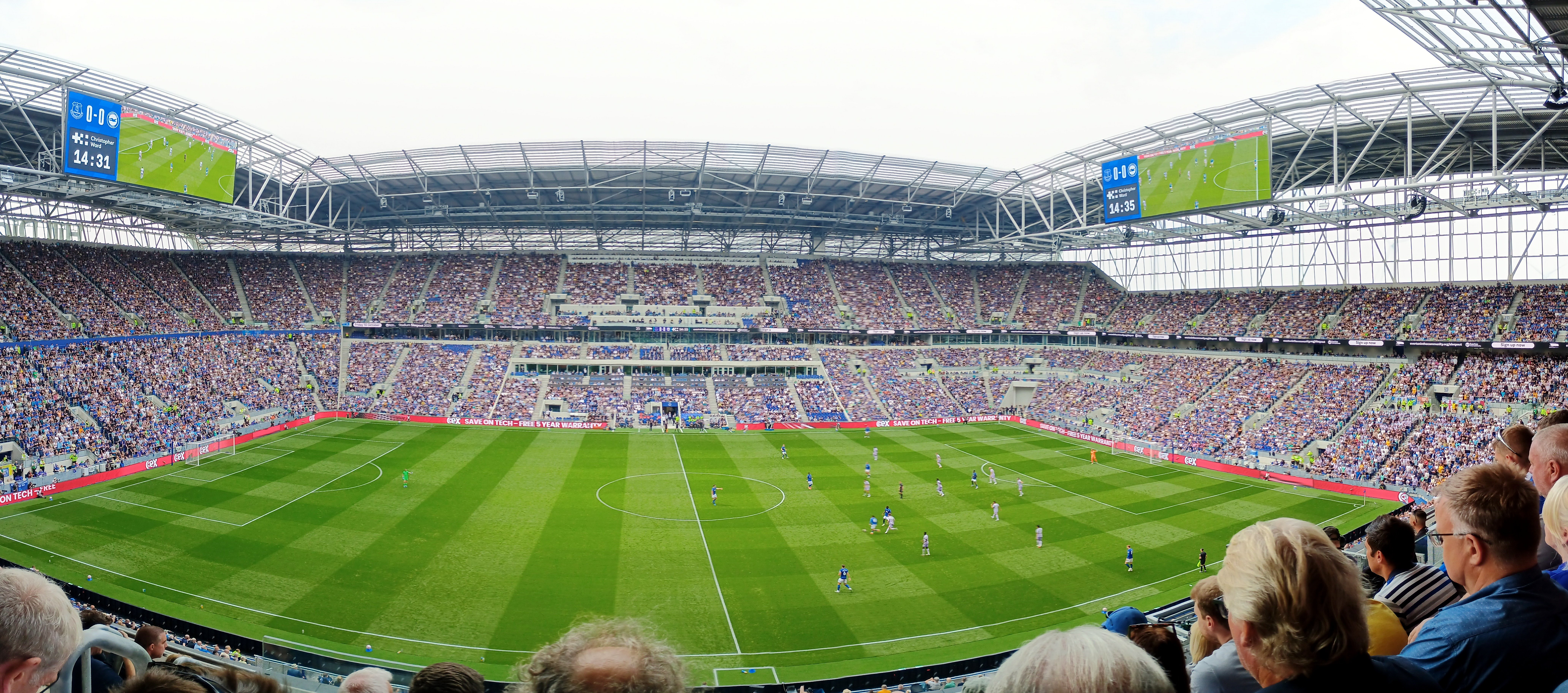
Panoramic stitch of the stadium's interior.

== Usage ==
=== Everton's home ground ===
The stadium hosts Everton's home fixtures starting from the 2025–26 season. Everton Women, who made Goodison Park their home ground ahead of the 2025–26 season, also play select home fixtures at the Hill Dickinson Stadium, with the first coming on 12 October 2025 in a Women's Super League match against Manchester United Women.

=== International football ===
==== Men's ====
Before completion of the stadium, in April 2023, the stadium was announced as one of ten host venues for the 2028 UEFA European Championships.

International football fixtures
Date	Time (BST)	Team 1	Score	Team 2	Competition	Attendance	Ref.
31 March 2026	19:30	Ivory Coast	1–0	Scotland	Friendly	33,034	
11 June 2028	--:--	D3	–	D4	Euro 2028 Group D		
14 June 2028	--:--	A2	–	A4	Euro 2028 Group A		
17 June 2028	--:--	E2	–	E4	Euro 2028 Group E		
20 June 2028	--:--	C2	–	C3	Euro 2028 Group C		
24 June 2028	--:--	Runner-up Group A	–	Runner-up Group B	Euro 2028 Round of 16		

==== Women's ====
International football fixtures
Date	Time (BST)	Team 1	Score	Team 2	Competition	Attendance	Ref.
9 June 2026	20:00	England	3–0	Ukraine	2027 FIFA World Cup qualification	26,065	

=== Rugby league ===
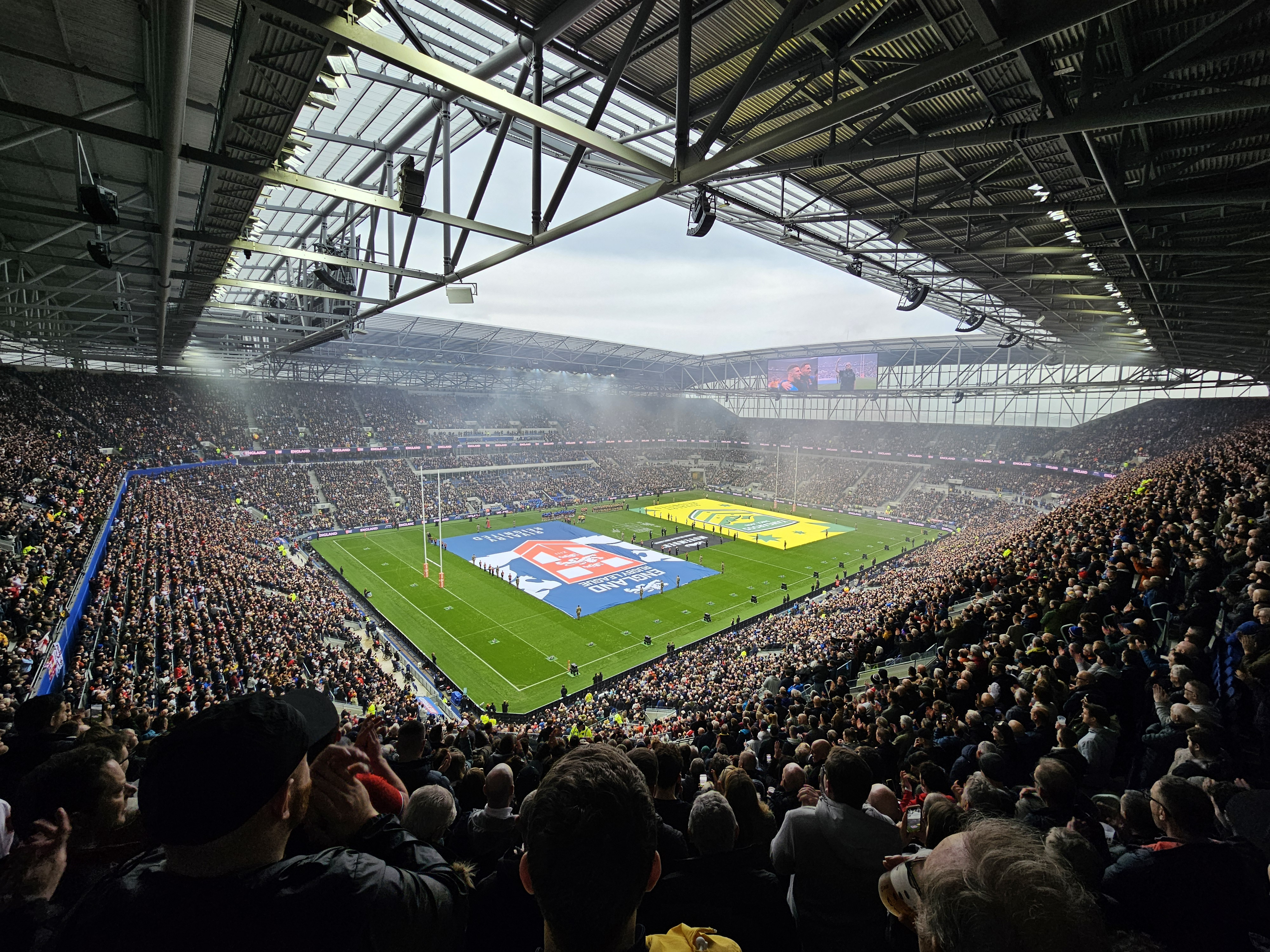
The stadium before kickoff of Test 2 the 2025 Rugby League Ashes

Also announced before the opening of the stadium; in March 2025, the stadium was confirmed as the host the second Test of the 2025 Ashes Series, the first non-football event at the stadium. The match was won by Australia, defeating England 14–4.

On 25 November 2025, the stadium was announced as the host venue of the 2026 edition of Super League's Magic Weekend. During the event, the stadium was announced as the host of the following year's edition in 2027, following a record attendance for the event.

International rugby league fixtures
Date	Time (GMT)	Team 1	Score	Team 2	Competition	Attendance	Ref.
1 November 2025	14:30	England	4–14	Australia	2025 Ashes Series	52,106	

Club rugby league fixtures
Date	Time (BST)	Team 1	Score	Team 2	Competition	Attendance	Ref.
4 July 2026	12:30	Huddersfield	24–36	York	2026 Super League (Magic Weekend)	34,579	
4 July 2026	15:00	Hull KR	26–12	Hull FC	2026 Super League (Magic Weekend)	34,579	
4 July 2026	17:30	Leigh	24–6	Warrington	2026 Super League (Magic Weekend)	34,579	
5 July 2026	12:30	Wakefield	48–6	Castleford	2026 Super League (Magic Weekend)	42,903	
5 July 2026	15:00	Leeds	50–16	Bradford	2026 Super League (Magic Weekend)	42,903	
5 July 2026	17:30	Wigan	16–14	St Helens	2026 Super League (Magic Weekend)	42,903	
1 May 2027	12:30	TBA	–	TBA	2027 Super League (Magic Weekend)		
1 May 2027	15:00	TBA	–	TBA	2027 Super League (Magic Weekend)		
1 May 2027	17:30	TBA	–	TBA	2027 Super League (Magic Weekend)		
2 May 2027	12:30	TBA	–	TBA	2027 Super League (Magic Weekend)		
2 May 2027	15:00	TBA	–	TBA	2027 Super League (Magic Weekend)		
2 May 2027	17:30	TBA	–	TBA	2027 Super League (Magic Weekend)		

=== Rugby union ===
It was reported by The Guardian in January 2026 that Everton was in line to host Fiji's "home" match against England in the 2026 Nations Championship. The report mentioned that the switch, which was sanctioned by World Rugby, was to maximise the revenue Fiji receive from gate receipts and due to the lack of suitable venues in the country. Everton's new stadium was the preferred option for all parties, with negotiations over the terms of the agreement ongoing. The following month Everton was confirmed as the venue to host Fiji and England in the second round of the 2026 Nations Championship, the first international rugby union Test match at the stadium.

International rugby union fixtures
Date	Time (BST)	Team 1	Score	Team 2	Competition	Attendance	Ref.
11July 2026	14:10	Fiji	8–73	England	2026 Nations Championship	50,209	
