= Anschutz Entertainment Group =

American sporting and music entertainment company

Anschutz Entertainment Group, Inc.
- Type: Subsidiary
- Industry: Entertainment
- Founded: 1994; 32 years ago
- Founder: Philip Anschutz
- Headquarters: L.A. Live, Los Angeles, California, United States
- Area served: Worldwide
- Key people: Dan Beckerman (president and CEO)
- Parent: The Anschutz Corporation
- Subsidiaries: AEG Presents; Bristol Bay Productions; Coachella Music Festival; Goldenvoice; Walden Media
- Website: aegworldwide.com

Anschutz Entertainment Group, Inc. (AEG), also known as AEG Worldwide, is an American global sporting and music entertainment presenter and a subsidiary of the Anschutz Corporation. It is the world's largest owner of sports teams and sports events. Under the AEG Presents brand, it is the world's second-largest presenter of live music and entertainment events, after Live Nation. AEG Presents was founded in 2002 as AEG Live.

== Overview ==
AEG owns and operates a variety of venues, sport teams, and entertainment concerns. For venues, AEG owns and operates Crypto.com Arena and Dignity Health Sports Park, and managed the XL Center and Rentschler Field. In England, it operates The O2 which includes a 20,000 capacity arena. As part of the development of The O2, Anschutz also purchased the London river service company Thames Clippers, and supported the development of the nearby David Beckham Academy (which also had a branch at the then known Home Depot Center). The company had its headquarters in Downtown Los Angeles.

In sports teams, the company owns the Los Angeles Galaxy, Los Angeles Kings, Ontario Reign, Eisbären Berlin with Uber Arena, and 23.5% of Hammarby IF. AEG sold off its minority stake in the Los Angeles Lakers and Los Angeles Sparks in 2021. AEG also owned Hamburg Freezers before ceasing its existence in 2016. The company also purchased the Champions on Ice figure skating tour in 2006, and own 12% of Djurgårdens IF Hockey. The company makes a significant amount of its money by leveraging its sports interests, already significant earners, by using the stadiums in which these teams play to host various other entertainment events, most notably concerts. Philip Anschutz created the company by buying up several small local promoters in Los Angeles in order to fill up the schedule for his new sports venue, Staples Center. These included ConcertsWest and Goldenvoice, which had been founded by Gary Tovar, and promotes the annual Coachella Valley Music and Arts Festival. AEG was the second-largest event promoter in the United States.

AEG Presents, previously AEG Live, came to international public attention in 2009 when it acted as the promoter for Michael Jackson's This Is It concerts. Jackson died just three weeks before the series of 50 concerts were due to begin. Members of Jackson's family have said that they would like to see an investigation, in general, into the role of AEG Live in the final weeks of his life, and also, in particular, into the role of the personal advisers and representatives whom they believe the promoters put in place for him.

On September 18, 2012, the Anschutz Corporation announced its intent to sell Anschutz Entertainment Group and its holdings. The company has retained financial advisors Blackstone Advisory Partners to assist in AEG's sale process. There had been some concerns about the sale as AEG was instrumental in the development of Farmers Field, a planned football stadium in Downtown Los Angeles that was intended to attract an NFL team to the city. Approval to begin construction of Farmers Field in 2013 for a 2016 completion was in the process of being finalized at the time that AEG's sale was announced. In 2015, plans for Farmers Field were abandoned when then St. Louis Rams owner Stan Kroenke announced plans for a stadium of his own.

On March 14, 2013, Anschutz that announced AEG was no longer for sale and that it was changing CEOs. Tim Leiweke (CEO since 1996) left the firm; John Skorjanec was named VP of National Media Accounts with Dan Beckerman heading AEG.

AEG's primary subsidiary AEG Facilities merged with its rival venue operator SMG in October 2019, forming ASM Global.

=== Acquisitions ===
- December 2000: Concerts West, Los Angeles
- March 2001: Goldenvoice, Los Angeles

== Arenas ==
AEG owns Crypto.com Arena in Los Angeles, Dignity Health Sports Park in Carson, California, and Barclays Arena in Hamburg. Additionally, AEG operates The O2 Arena in London, Uber Arena in Berlin, T-Mobile Center in Kansas City, Target Center in Minneapolis, Shrine Auditorium in Los Angeles, The Colosseum at Caesars Palace in Las Vegas, the Oakland–Alameda County Coliseum, Oakland Arena in Oakland, Shell Energy Stadium in Houston, The Theatre at Grand Prairie in Dallas, and SNHU Arena in Manchester (New Hampshire).

Anschutz's investment in the O2, through his company Anschutz Entertainment Group, previously resulted in his involvement in controversy related to the possible influence of former British Deputy Prime Minister John Prescott in the award of the "super casino" license by the British government. Anschutz knew Prescott personally, having had him as a guest for a two-night stay at Anschutz's ranch in 2005 and footing the bill for hospitality and gifts. In January 2007, the "super casino" license was awarded to a group in Manchester, rather than to Blackpool or London. Anschutz spent £50m on the Manchester Arena and the winner of the casino licence is a close ally of Anschutz, Sol Kerzner.

In August 2007, AEG announced plans with Harrah's Entertainment to build a privately financed 20,000-seat arena in Paradise, Nevada on the Las Vegas Strip on Harrah's land located directly behind the Bally's Las Vegas and Paris Las Vegas resorts. The informal partnership was dissolved the following year.

In October 2011, AEG reached an agreement with Sociedade Esportiva Palmeiras and WTorre to manage São Paulo's then-upcoming Arena Palmeiras.

In September 2013, it was announced that AEG Facilities, a stand-alone affiliate of AEG, had signed a 15-year contract to operate Wembley Arena in London.

AEG Live partnered with MGM Resorts International to build the T-Mobile Arena in Las Vegas, which opened in April 2016.

AEG Ogden, a joint venture with Australian investors, managed sports venues and convention centres in Australia and Asia, including the International Convention Centre Sydney, Lang Park and Sydney SuperDome.

== Sports ventures ==
=== Soccer ===
Anschutz was one of the co-founders and one of the lead investors of Major League Soccer. In 1996, he became the investor/operator of the Colorado Rapids, his first MLS franchise. The Rapids were then a subsidiary of the Anschutz Corporation. In subsequent years, as Anschutz acquired additional sports teams, it led to the formation of a new division of the company whose focus was sports and entertainment, leading directly to the creation of AEG, with the Rapids and National Hockey League's (NHL) Los Angeles Kings as its original members.

Since 1996, AEG has held ownership in the Chicago Fire, San Jose Earthquakes, New York/New Jersey MetroStars, D.C. United and Houston Dynamo. Currently, AEG is the operator of the Los Angeles Galaxy.

Anschutz was inducted into the National Soccer Hall of Fame in 2006. Also in 2006, Anschutz received the National Soccer Medal of Honor, one of four recipients to ever receive the award. In 2007, Anschutz and AEG played a role in bringing David Beckham to the United States. In 2009, he joined the Board of Directors of USA Bid Committee, a group which was formed with the aim of promoting the application and campaign to bring the World Cup to the United States. This was ultimately successful with the 2026 World Cup.

Between 2001 and 2019, AEG was the biggest external investor and minority shareholder of Swedish Allsvenskan club Hammarby IF. On 27 November 2019, it was announced that Zlatan Ibrahimović had acquired 23.5 percent of the outstanding shares in Hammarby, which meant that AEG reduced their stake by half.

AEG were part of a consortium with Tottenham Hotspur which proposed to demolish the London 2012 Olympic Stadium in Stratford and then to build a new 60,000 seater soccer specific stadium in its place and to renovate the Crystal Palace athletics stadium. These proposals were rejected as they violated the Olympic legacy provisions of the UK government.

=== Ice hockey ===
AEG owns the NHL's Los Angeles Kings, the AHL's Ontario Reign, the ECHL's Cincinnati Cyclones (co-owned with Nederlander Entertainment), and the German ice hockey team Eisbären Berlin. AEG also formerly owned the Manchester Monarchs and an interest in the Reading Royals, both of the ECHL.

=== Golf ===
In July 2010, it was announced that Xanterra Parks & Resorts, Inc. had entered into an agreement to purchase the Kingsmill Resort near Williamsburg, Virginia. Xanterra, owned by Anschutz since 2008, has traditionally operated in national and state parks across the United States, especially in the Western regions, including Yellowstone National Park in Wyoming and Crater Lake National Park in Oregon. As of 2010, Xanterra was operating about three dozen hotels and lodges with more than 5,000 guest rooms combined, with over 8,000 employees.

=== Other ===
Anschutz Entertainment Group also owned the Tour of California bicycling race and the Bay to Breakers footrace.

The company also managed the T-Mobile Center in Kansas City, Missouri, and managed the XL Center in Hartford, Connecticut until 2013. They previously operated Rentschler Field in Hartford from 2007 to 2010, during which they held a stake in the now-defunct Hartford Colonials of the UFL.

In April 2016, AEG announced a partnership with esports company ESL; the next year the company also announced an investment in the North American esports organization, Immortals.

In 2025, the company launched the College Basketball Crown, a postseason college basketball tournament, in conjunction with Fox Sports.

== Film ==
When the 1968 John Wayne movie Hellfighters was being shot in 1967, Anschutz charged Universal Pictures a US$100,000 fee (equivalent to $1 million in 2025) to film real firefighters extinguishing a real oil blaze on his land.

Anschutz Film Group (formerly Crusader Entertainment, now known as Bristol Bay Productions and Walden Media) produced the commercially successful Holes in 2003 and The Chronicles of Narnia: The Lion, the Witch, and the Wardrobe in 2005.

The company also played a significant role in the 2009 documentary–concert film Michael Jackson's This Is It.

== Ticketing ==
AEG partnered with Outbox Enterprises, a start up company, in which AEG is both an equity partner and a client, to develop AXS (pronounced "access"). AXS is a digital marketing platform for purchasing tickets for sports and entertainment events.

== Controversies ==
=== Berlin ===
In Berlin, local groups started a boycott against the projected development Mediaspree, of which Uber Arena (formerly O2 World and Mercedes-Benz Arena) is a part, arguing that huge sections of public spaces were being lost to the private sector. Furthermore, the Anschutz company was criticized for bully-like behavior in regards to the changing of the outer parameters of the sports arena. A section of the nearby East Side Gallery, a leftover piece of the Berlin Wall now serving as an international memorial for peace and freedom, had to be removed to enable the view of Anschutz's new arena, located on the former eastern side of the city along the river Spree. AEG has since promised to financially support the preservation of the East Side Gallery.

=== Michael Jackson memorial service ===
AEG had a global interest in the death of Michael Jackson by hosting a public memorial service at Crypto.com Arena (formerly Staples Center), a prominent music venue in Los Angeles and home of the Grammy Museum. The event included security and logistical support by the City of Los Angeles totaling $3.2 million. During this expense to the city during the Great Recession, some economists estimated that the event also generated $4 million for local businesses such as hotels and restaurants. City Council members and local media have called for the cost of the memorial incurred by the city to be paid for by the Jackson family or AEG, instead of by the city taxpayer. In June 2010, AEG agreed to pay the city of Los Angeles $1.3 million to offset some of the cost incurred by the city during the tribute event.

AEG was also accused of having attempted to profit from the death of Michael Jackson, who was due to perform at London's O2 Arena in 2009 and 2010. The approximately 750,000 tickets were eligible for refund upon request, but the promoter offered to send out "souvenir" tickets if customers waived their right to the refund. The company estimated that 40–50% of its customers would request the original tickets in lieu of the refund, which would save the company $40 million in refunds. That was in addition to future profits from any material that formed a part of the "This Is It" concerts, which AEG made its intellectual property in sponsoring the concerts.

After Conrad Murray, the physician appointed by AEG to take care of Jackson during the run-up and throughout the "This Is It" concerts, was found guilty of involuntary manslaughter in the California v. Murray case, Katherine Jackson, Michael's mother and legal guardian of his three children, filed a wrongful death suit against the promoter, seeking damages reportedly exceeding tens of billions of dollars. AEG filed a motion to have the case dismissed which was denied by a Los Angeles County judge who ruled that sufficient evidence was present for the progression to a jury trial. The trial began on April 2. Murray served jail time for the death of Jackson, and indicated that if he was called as a witness for this case, he would refuse to testify to avoid incriminating himself amid his sentence appeal, as he had not previously testified under oath regarding Jackson's death. On October 2, 2013, AEG was found not liable in the death of Michael Jackson.

== See also ==
- AXS TV
- Regal Entertainment Group
