= Michael Friisdahl =

Canadian sports and entertainment executive

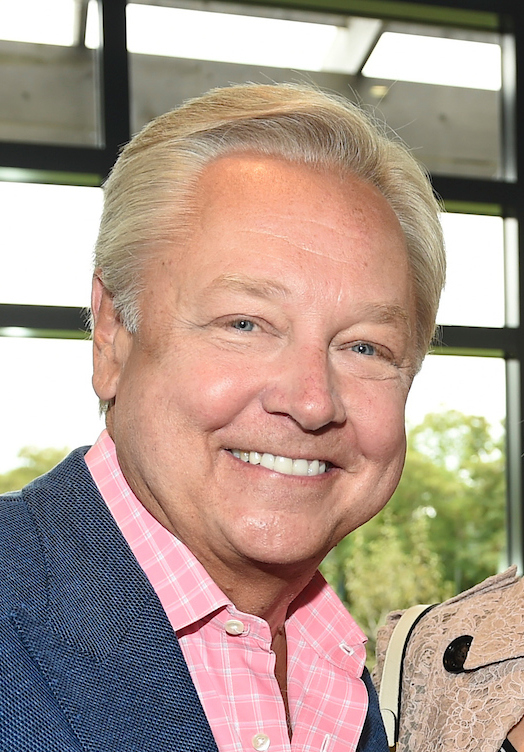
- Friisdahl at Windfields Estate (Canadian Film Centre|CFC), September 2019
- Born: Roskilde, Denmark
- Occupation: Aviation executive

Michael Friisdahl (born in Roskilde, Denmark) is the former executive chairman of Signature Aviation, a multinational aviation services company. He was appointed in February 2022 after having served as the president and CEO of Maple Leaf Sports & Entertainment. He was responsible for overseeing MLSE's sports properties; MLSE owns the Toronto Maple Leafs (National Hockey League), Toronto Raptors (National Basketball Association), Toronto FC (Major League Soccer), Toronto Argonauts (Canadian Football League), Toronto Marlies (American Hockey League), Raptors 905 (NBA G League) and Toronto FC II (United Soccer League).

Prior to joining MLSE, Friisdahl was the president and CEO of Air Canada's Leisure Group since it formed in 2012, combining Air Canada Vacations tour operations with Air Canada Rouge, a vacation and leisure airline subsidiary of Air Canada.
