= Proposed Los Angeles NFL stadiums =

Over the 20-year absence of the National Football League from Los Angeles, many proposals were made for stadiums that would attract an NFL team to the Los Angeles Area. The trend began in 1995 when a stadium planned to be built in Hollywood Park was rejected by Los Angeles Raiders owner Al Davis in favor of relocating back to Oakland, California due to a stipulation that he would have had to share the stadium with a future second team.

It was SoFi Stadium in Inglewood that the league ultimately accepted in a January 2016 meeting ending the league's absence in the market and the absence of a suitable long term stadium for NFL football. After five years of construction the stadium became the home of the Los Angeles Rams and Los Angeles Chargers in 2020. This article covers the numerous stadium proposals for Los Angeles between 1995 and 2016.

== Los Angeles Seahawks ==
In 1996, Ken Behring, the then-owner of the Seattle Seahawks, expressed unhappiness with his team's facility, the Kingdome, and moved the team's offices to Anaheim, California, where the Rams had played from 1980 until they moved to St. Louis in 1995. However, the move was never completed, and the Seahawks eventually were sold to Paul Allen, who was instrumental in getting a new deal done with Seattle to build what is now Lumen Field. The Seahawks moved into the new stadium for the 2002 season.

== 1999 expansion team plans ==
In early May 1998, entertainment guru Michael Ovitz announced he would lead a largely privately financed $750 million project to build a stadium and shopping center called "The Hacienda" in Carson, California in hopes of landing the expansion team.

In late October 1998, NFL commissioner Paul Tagliabue announced that the NFL owners would indeed expand the league to 32 teams, and would decide by April 1999 which city would be awarded the NFL expansion franchise. Meanwhile, Ovitz now had competition coming from his own market, as real estate developer Ed Roski announced a rival bid for a future Los Angeles team; his proposal centered around putting a 68,000-seat stadium inside the shell of the historic Los Angeles Memorial Coliseum.

On March 16, 1999, the NFL owners, by a 29–2 vote, approved a resolution to award Los Angeles the expansion 32nd franchise. However, the award was contingent on the city's putting together an acceptable ownership team and stadium deal by September 15. If the parties could not reach an agreement or be reasonably close to doing so, the committee would then turn its recommendation to Houston, who had put in an expansion team bid to replace the Houston Oilers, who had relocated to Nashville and subsequently rebranded as the Tennessee Titans.

A month later, NFL executives flew to Los Angeles, and were shocked at the lack of progress: Los Angeles would not allow tax dollars to be used for a new stadium, the competing groups were locked in a standoff as neither would concede its bid to the other nor would the groups agree to combine their efforts in attempts to put together a deal, and neither group was prepared to build a state-of-the-art facility, which rival expansion team bidder Houston had promised since 1997.

A return visit in late May yielded little change: Ovitz and Roski were still locked in a standoff; Roski's bid remained unchanged since the onset, while Ovitz unveiled plans to turn the area around the Coliseum into a 60-acre (240,000 m^{2}) complex of parks, parking garages, shopping areas and a brand-new stadium. Though Tagliabue and the NFL officials were pleased with the concept, they were daunted by the costs which included $225 million for parking garages, especially since neither Los Angeles nor the State of California was willing to commit the necessary funds.

At this point, Tagliabue expressed his frustration with Los Angeles’ inability to get a plan together, and the next month, he advised Houston bidder Bob McNair to resume his discussions with the expansion committee.

On September 9, 1999, the league's expansion committee indicated that McNair and other Houston officials should be prepared to attend an October 6 meeting of the NFL owners in Atlanta. The NFL noted that the Los Angeles effort was still making no progress and now featured a three-way battle between Ovitz, Roski, and newcomer Marvin Davis. Although the league would still entertain an offer from any of the competing Los Angeles groups, the league would now consider an offer from McNair and Houston as well.

In the first week of October, Ovitz announced that his group was prepared to offer $540 million for the 32nd NFL franchise to be awarded to Los Angeles. However, later that week, McNair's Houston NFL Holdings proposed a bid of $700 million to the owners for the NFL to award the 32nd franchise to Houston instead.

On the morning of October 6, 1999, McNair's persistence finally paid off as the NFL owners voted 29–0 to accept McNair's higher offer, thus leading to the formation of the Houston Texans.

== Rose Bowl Stadium (2003) ==
The Rose Bowl was a proposed site for an NFL relocation or even an expansion team to Los Angeles. In 2003, architects proposed a $500 million renovation to the Rose Bowl Stadium in order to meet the needs of an NFL team, but also appease the residents of Pasadena. This charge was led by John Moag, an investment banker who was a leader in the attempt to relocate the Cleveland Browns to Baltimore. Los Angeles had been without a team since 1994, but with the second best TV market in the nation, the NFL was eyeing bringing a team back. The renovation would take a minimum of 23 months and would focus on renovating the interior of the stadium. While the outer shell would stay the same, the capacity would drop from 92,000 people to 68,000 people (although retaining the ability to expand to 75,000 people). Most of the historical and culturally important aspects of the stadium, such as the marquee outside, would stay.

The Pasadena residents were not on board with this proposal. The traffic and parking issues that would come with this new team would be tremendously difficult. Furthermore, they worried about losing their neighborhood stadium to the NFL. Regarding the proposed underground parking, one resident reported “‘That’s ridiculous that they can build underground parking in a streambed. It’s inappropriate, it’s far too expensive, and it just isn’t going to work’”. The President of the Tournament of Roses at the time, Mitch Dorger, stated that “‘We’re very interested in maintaining a viable venue for our game. We would like to see a proposal that finds a way to do that’”. Based on the residents of the neighborhood and the Tournament of Roses committee, the main reason for not wanting the new NFL stadium was the disturbance to both the neighborhood and the historical and cultural values of the stadium and area.

Furthermore, the Rose Bowl decided against hosting even a temporary NFL team in 2015 due to attempts at establishing a music and arts festival. Other contenders for this temporary site were the Los Angeles Coliseum, Dodger Stadium, Angel Stadium, and StubHub Center.

== Dodger Stadium parking lot (2005) ==
Several other sites were mentioned as possible locations for a new stadium. Then Los Angeles Dodgers owner Frank McCourt had expressed interest in building a new football stadium next to Dodger Stadium (which is also near downtown Los Angeles). Angel Stadium of Anaheim was reconfigured as a baseball-only park in the mid-1990s, but there had been proposals to build a new football stadium next to it. The Dodger Stadium parking lot had been discussed by NFL owners, in private, as possibly being the best site in Southern California to build a new professional football stadium. Officials with the Dodgers and the NFL met in secret twice in 2005 to discuss the possibility of constructing a stadium and retail complex adjacent to Dodger Stadium. After the Boston Herald reported the details of the plan, political pressure forced both the NFL and Dodgers owner Frank McCourt to deny that either party was aggressively pursuing the idea.

== Los Angeles Stadium in the City of Industry (2008) ==
Los Angeles Stadium
- Interactive map of Los Angeles Stadium
- Location: City of Industry, California
- Coordinates: 34.011155°N 117.827511°W
- Owner: Edward P. Roski
- Capacity: 75,000 (estimated, expandable to 80,000 for Super Bowl games)

Construction
- Cost: $800 million (estimated)
- Architects: Aedas Sport and Dan Meis, FAIA

Los Angeles Stadium was a proposed 75,000-seat football stadium, the centerpiece of a 600-acre entertainment district in the City of Industry, California. Edward P. Roski, a part-owner of the Los Angeles Lakers of the NBA and Los Angeles Kings of the NHL, announced plans for a stadium on the northern side of the interchange of state routes 57 and 60, 22 miles (35 km) east of Downtown Los Angeles with the purpose of attracting an NFL team to the Los Angeles region.

The City of Industry proposal, which received a full approval from all regulatory authorities but never found a willing team to move into the proposed stadium, sat dormant from 2011 until the Inglewood proposal was approved.

=== History ===
Roski, who helped build Staples Center, stated that the new 75,000-seat stadium would be privately financed and would be the centerpiece of a new 600-acre entertainment and retail complex in the City of Industry which would have included 25,000 ample on-site parking spaces. The proposed stadium and mixed-use development was designed by Dan Meis, FAIA, and Aedas Sport out of Los Angeles. The Los Angeles County site would have put it in reach of 12 million people in a 25-mile (40 km) radius, including in Orange, Riverside, and San Bernardino Counties, San Gabriel Valley and the San Fernando Valley. Roski and his spokesman asserted that a football stadium in the city could have meant as much as $400 million in yearly revenue to businesses and brought more than 18,000 jobs to the area. Project supporters asserted that aspects of the stadium design, such as the use of hilly terrain to vastly reduce the cost of construction and the multi-use capabilities of the planned surrounding development, as well as Roski's success in gaining support from local elected officials in the City of Industry, where the proposed stadium site was located, gave the plan a strong possibility of success. Project critics asserted that it required more public funding than had been stated, and questioned the costs and benefits of the project.

Roski said he would not break ground on the stadium until he has a commitment from an NFL team to move to Los Angeles. In exchange for footing the bill to construct the stadium, Roski wanted at least a 30% ownership stake in any team that moved to Los Angeles to play there.

Given that the National Football League was not planning on expanding, the developers of the new stadium stated on their website that their tenant would be an existing team "that needs to move because they cannot build a new stadium or financially they are not successful in their current market. We can not disclose which teams we are talking with." The three teams which used to play in Los Angeles but moved elsewhere (the San Diego Chargers, St. Louis Rams and Oakland Raiders, the first two of which would eventually move back to Los Angeles) were suspected possible tenants. The Jacksonville Jaguars and the Minnesota Vikings had also been identified by Roski and others as possible prime tenants of the new stadium. The Vikings ceased to be candidates after a financial package providing for construction of a new stadium in Minneapolis was approved by both the Minnesota State Legislature and the Minneapolis City Council. The Jaguars also fell out of contention for Roski. Wayne Weaver, during his press conference announcement of selling the Jaguars to Shahid Khan during mid-season in 2011, explained that Roski did call him in an attempt to buy the team, but was instantly turned down, saying "It was a waste of my time and his". Khan said that he wanted to put the city of Jacksonville on the map and had no plans to move the team. The Buffalo Bills were also considered a potential relocation candidate, but Erie County was able to force the team to sign an ironclad lease in 2012 prohibiting them from relocating and, through political and community pressure, dissuaded all Los Angeles-based prospective buyers from bidding on the team when it came up for sale in 2014, eventually selling to Terry and Kim Pegula.

On February 28, 2009 the City of Industry city council approved the environmental impact report 5-0. The neighboring cities of Diamond Bar and Walnut both expressed concerns about the noise, traffic, and environmental impacts of the proposed stadium. Walnut and a Walnut-based citizens group comprising eight homeowners filed lawsuits to block the project, but were unsuccessful.

Shortly after the Inglewood stadium was chosen, Roski shifted focus to Las Vegas, where what is now known as Allegiant Stadium was being proposed for the Raiders. He withdrew his involvement from the project in October 2016.

Ultimately, the land was developed as part of the Industry Business Center, a tract of warehouses.

== Farmers Field (2010) ==
Farmers Field
- Interactive map of Farmers Field
- Former names: Los Angeles Events Center
- Location: South Figueroa Street; Los Angeles
- Coordinates: 34.0431°N 118.2698°W,
- Owner: Anschutz Entertainment Group
- Capacity: 72,000 (estimated) (expandable to 76,000 for special events, e.g. Super Bowl)

Construction
- Cost: US$1.2 billion (estimated)
- Architect: Gensler

Farmers Field was a proposed sports and events stadium in Downtown Los Angeles, California, United States, at the current site of the West Hall of the Los Angeles Convention Center, adjacent to Crypto.com Arena and was Phase IIII of LA Live construction.

The project was spearheaded in 2010 by outgoing Anschutz Entertainment Group (AEG) president Tim Leiweke and former Los Angeles Avengers owner Casey Wasserman. The project marked AEG's second attempt at building a stadium there following a similar proposal in 2002. The Los Angeles City Council approved the project in a 12-0 vote in 2012, with the hope of the region fielding an NFL team for the first time since the Rams and Raiders left the Los Angeles area.

=== History ===
ICON Venue Group, a firm in the sports and entertainment industry, was hired by AEG to represent them in the entitlement process with the city of Los Angeles in February 2011. ICON had originally partnered with AEG in 2002 for AEG's first stadium proposal attempt. That project was to be located on the same site of AEG's current proposal. The new proposal was that the West Hall of the Los Angeles Convention Center would be torn down and rebuilt further south at a cost of US$350 million. Following the completion of the rebuilt West Hall, construction of a 72,000-seat retractable roof stadium would have begun over the 15 acre site. AEG expected to begin construction of the stadium by March 2013 and be completed by late 2016. Though the stadium itself was to be financed by AEG, the company proposed that the cost of the rebuilt West Hall of the convention center be funded by city issued bonds, which would have been repaid by taxes assessed on events in the proposed stadium as well as rent paid by AEG for using the land the stadium would have been on. The proposed stadium was suggested as a possible venue for future Super Bowls and NCAA Division I Men's Basketball Championships. In December 2010, Magic Johnson announced his partnership with AEG's proposal after selling his minority stake in the Los Angeles Lakers NBA team and multiple Starbucks coffeehouse locations.

The project announced in mid-2010 was initially projected at a cost of US$750 million. The feasibility of constructing a 72,000-seat (expandable to 76,000 seats for special events such as the Super Bowl) retractable roof stadium at the announced cost came into question when compared to the two newest facilities of the NFL, AT&T Stadium and MetLife Stadium, which were built at a cost of US$1.3 and US$1.6 billion, respectively. Shortly thereafter, Leiweke set a formal timeline for the proposed project. The project's estimated total cost was US$1.2 billion as of 2011.

On February 1, 2011, Farmers Insurance Group announced it had signed a 30-year, $700 million naming rights deal for the stadium, with the stadium to be called Farmers Field. The deal was potentially worth $1 billion if two NFL teams relocated to Farmers Field.

In February 2011, Farmers emphasized that its naming rights agreement would be spread out over 30 years and that it could walk away from the deal if the Los Angeles stadium wasn't completed. "While we have every confidence that this project will get done, if it does not materialize, Farmers Insurance will pay no money for the project," said Mark Toohey, senior vice president at Farmers.

On March 25, 2011, Gensler was selected by AEG to design the proposed football stadium. Five teams; the Minnesota Vikings, San Diego Chargers, St. Louis Rams, Jacksonville Jaguars and Oakland Raiders were speculated as candidates for relocation. The Vikings were the front-runners until they were taken out of consideration after the Minnesota State Senate approved a financing package that would allow the team to build a new stadium on the former footprint of the Metrodome in Minneapolis, which opened in August 2016.

The Los Angeles City Council approved the project in a 12-0 vote on September 28, 2012. The building of the stadium was contingent on reaching a deal with the NFL and a team agreeing to move to Los Angeles. Teams were allowed to begin applying to make that move beginning January 1, 2013.

With the departure of Leiweke from AEG, it became less likely that AEG would participate in the construction of Farmers Field. By May 2014, the prospects for a downtown stadium had diminished to such a degree that a committee of the Los Angeles City Council voted to move forward with alternative plans to expand the Convention Center without the stadium.

On March 9, 2015, AEG announced that it would not seek an extension for its April 17 deadline to reach an agreement with an NFL team, effectively shutting down the proposal. The St. Louis Rams had reached an agreement with Inglewood to build an 80,000 seat stadium two weeks earlier, while the Oakland Raiders and the San Diego Chargers had expected their joint stadium bid to be approved by Carson in the coming months, eliminating the need for a third party to build a stadium. AEG had invested over $50 million in the project over five years.

=== Legal challenge and settlement ===
In 2009, AEG pushed for a state law that limited potential legal challenges against the stadium to a 175-day period.

In a settlement announced November 1, 2012, the coalition, called Play Fair at Farmers Field, secured "$50 million in concessions... including $10.3 million for a new platform at a Metro Blue Line station and $8 million in upgrades to a plaza outside the Convention Center."

== Carson Stadium (2015) ==
Los Angeles Stadium
- Interactive map of Los Angeles Stadium
- Location: Carson, California, U.S.
- Coordinates: 33.843263°N 118.271819°W,
- Capacity: 65,000 (expandable to 75,000 for Super Bowls)
- Executive suites: 202
- Surface: Natural grass
- Acreage: 157 acres

Construction
- Cost: $1.78 billion
- Architect: MANICA Architecture

Tenants
- Los Angeles Raiders; Los Angeles Chargers

Carson Stadium, referred to in renderings as Los Angeles Stadium, was an American football stadium planned to be built in Carson, California, 13 miles (21 km) south of downtown Los Angeles. It was proposed to become the joint home of the San Diego Chargers and Oakland Raiders. The Chargers and Raiders planned the shared, $1.7 billion stadium in the city of Carson, if both teams had failed to get new stadiums in their current hometowns. However, NFL owners failed to approve the stadium, instead opting for a new NFL stadium in Inglewood proposed by Los Angeles Rams owner Stan Kroenke.

=== History ===
Since 2007, the Chargers had an option every February 1 to terminate their lease at Qualcomm Stadium, their home at the time since 1967. Under the lease terms, the Chargers would have owed the city an exit fee in the amount of $17.6 million if they had relocated in or before 2015. The team had been working to build a publicly funded stadium since 2002 and proposed a new stadium as part of a convention center annex. However, the plan faced opposition from local politicians and hotel owners who voiced a preference for an expansion of the existing San Diego Convention Center.

The Raiders had been working with Oakland politicians to build a commercial development project dubbed the Coliseum City project that would have included new stadiums for the Raiders and the Oakland Athletics baseball team, who shared Oakland Coliseum, which opened in 1966. The team offered to contribute $300 million with an additional $200 million coming from the NFL, but that left $500 million of funding to be determined and Oakland Mayor Libby Schaaf expressed opposition to using public funds. The Raiders had been on a year-to-year lease on the Coliseum since the previous long-term lease ended after the 2013 season.

On February 19, 2015, the Chargers and Raiders announced plans for a privately financed $1.7 billion stadium that the two teams would build in Carson if they were to move to the Los Angeles market. However, both teams stated that they would continue to attempt to get stadiums built in their respective cities. The site of the planned stadium was largely on a former landfill next to the 405 freeway. It had been looked at in the 1970s and 1980s by the Rams and Raiders respectively as a possible new stadium site and was the Carson site explored by Michael Ovitz in 1998 for a stadium and shopping center.

In April 2015, the Chargers and Raiders presented the stadium design renderings to NFL Commissioner Roger Goodell and the league's Committee on Los Angeles Opportunities. The proposed stadium was to be open-air with natural turf, and have a peristyle design inspired by the Los Angeles Memorial Coliseum with a tower that would have risen between 115 and 120 feet above the main concourse, and depending on which team was playing, would display simulated lightning bolts (for the Chargers) or a flame in honor of the late Al Davis (for the Raiders).

On April 22, 2015, the Carson City Council bypassed the option to put the stadium to a public vote and approved the plan 3-0. On May 5, 2015, the Carson City Council then unanimously approved $50 million to finish an environmental cleanup on the site. On May 19, 2015, the Chargers and Raiders announced that they had finalized a deal to secure the 157 acres of land in Carson, which was transferred to a joint powers authority in Carson after the site was purchased by Carson Holdings, a company set up by the two teams. The council voted without having clarified several issues, including who would finance the stadium, how the required three-way land swap would be performed, and how it would raise enough revenue if only one team moved in as tenant. It was these issues that would work against the project in Carson from being voted on successfully at the later NFL meeting on relocation of the Raiders and Chargers.

On November 11, 2015, Bob Iger, the CEO of The Walt Disney Company, was appointed non-executive chairman of the Carson stadium project.

During the Los Angeles meeting on January 12, 2016, the Committee on Los Angeles Opportunities, which consisted of six NFL owners, favored the Carson project over the Rams' Inglewood project. But, the NFL and the other NFL owners were persuaded by Jerry Jones to vote to allow the Rams to move back to Los Angeles while giving the Chargers an option to join them which they accepted a year later (the Raiders would have had the same option had the Chargers declined) thus effectively rejecting and killing the Carson proposal. An outlet mall was later approved for the site but the project was abandoned. The Chargers would play from 2017 until 2019 in Carson at Dignity Health Sports Park until SoFi Stadium in Inglewood was completed.

The stadium design was retained by the Raiders and was re-proposed minus the Chargers' features and with a dome, black exterior, and roll-out field for what ultimately became Allegiant Stadium in Paradise, Nevada when the team moved to the Las Vegas metropolitan area.

== See also ==
- History of the National Football League in Los Angeles
