= George Chayka =

Canadian gridiron football executive

BC Lions
- Title: Vice-president of football and business operations

Personal information
- Born: Sardis, Chilliwack, British Columbia, Canada

Career history
- 1992–1993: BC Lions (Sales and marketing)
- 1993–1996: BC Lions (Director of marketing)
- 1996–present: BC Lions (Vice-president of football and business operations)

George Chayka is a Canadian football executive who serves as vice-president of football and business operations for the BC Lions.

== Early life ==
Chayka was born in Sardis, British Columbia. He played running back and defensive back at Simon Fraser University from 1977-1980 and was a graduate assistant in 1981, coaching running backs and special teams.

== Agent ==
In 1982, Rick Klassen, a former SFU teammate who Chayka had known since elementary school, hired Chayka as his agent. In 1985, he began representing Klassen's teammate Gerald Roper. By 1988 his client list had grown to include John Ulmer, Joe Germain, Robert Molle, Tony Dennis, Leon Hatziioannou, Jim Mills, and Ian Sinclair. Chayka earned a reputation as a tough negotiator. He negotiated a contract for Roper that made him the CFL's highest-paid offensive lineman and one for Willie Pless that made him the highest-paid non-quarterback in the league.

While working as a player agent, Chayka also co-owned and managed a Vancouver nightclub and worked as a lumber broker.

== BC Lions ==
In 1992, Chayka joined the sales and marketing staff of the BC Lions. His client list was taken over by Klassen. Chayka left the Lions in March 1993 and joined former team president Frank Gigliotti on the staff of Dr. Lee Pulos. He returned to the team later that year as director of marketing. In 1996 he was promoted to vice-president of football and business operations. Under the Lions front-office structure, head coach Joe Paopao handled personnel and Chayka negotiated contracts. Chayka's role was essentially that of general manager while also maintaining his duties as director of marketing. The Lions finished 5–13 under Chayka and Paopao and Chayka's duties were shifted away from football operations and towards business development. His new role has him oversee game day operations, ticket and suite sales, sponsorship, and the selection of the team's training camp site. He also assumed operational duties of the club following the death of president Bob Ackles in 2008. In 2017, Chayka was inducted into the BC Football Hall of Fame and was recipient the Bob Ackles Award for outstanding contribution to Canadian Football.
