= Joe Galat =

American football player, coach and executive

General Manager of the BC Lions
- In office August 1, 1986 - 1989
- Preceded by: Bobby Ackles
- Succeeded by: Joe Kapp

General Manager of the Montreal Concordes
- In office 1983 - August 1, 1986
- Succeeded by: Norm Kimball

Personal details
- Born: April 22, 1939 (age 87) Painesville, Ohio, US
- Education: Miami University
- Sports career
- Sport: American football
- University team: Arizona State Sun Devils
- Football career

Career history
- 1982-1985: Montreal Concordes
- 1989: BC Lions

Joe Galat (born April 22, 1939 in Painesville, Ohio) is an American former football player, coach, general manager, broadcaster, and youth executive. He is best known as a former college and professional football coach who starred at Miami University (Ohio) as a player. In addition to an extensive college coaching career, Galat coached in the National Football League as a coach with the New York Giants and Houston Oilers, as well as in Canada. Galat also worked as a national color commentator for the Canadian Broadcasting Corporation (CBC) in Canada. He is the president of American Youth Football & Cheer. Established in 1996, the organization currently operates in 50 states and has more than 250,000 documented participants.

== Playing and coaching career ==
After playing for Harvey High School in Painesville, Ohio, Galat attended Miami University (Ohio) where he captained both the Miami Redskins football and wrestling teams. The university known as the ‘Cradle of Coaches’ remains today a member of the Mid-American Conference. Galat was inducted to the Miami Redhawks Hall of Fame. After graduation in 1962 Galat's football apprenticing would continue under the legendary coaching trio of Bo Schembechler, Carmen Cozza, and John McVay.

Galat was hired by Hall of Fame coach George Allen to rebuild the Montreal Alouettes, who had been reincarnated as the Montreal Concordes. The team under Nelson Skalbania had traded away their Canadian players for the rights to NFL free agents. The following year, the NFL players returned to the USA, leaving the team without US or Canadian talent.

After a tour as an assistant coach in the NCAA at Yale University, Miami University, and University of Kentucky, for the Memphis Southmen of the World Football League, and for the New York Giants and Houston Oilers of the NFL, the Painesville native was hired as head coach and general manager of the then Montreal Concordes in the Canadian Football League by then-owner George Allen. In the hockey crazed province of Quebec, Galat hired the first French Canadian coach in CFL history, Jacques Dussault. Galat and Dussault initiated clinics to teach and motivate people to play the game of football in the province of Quebec.

Galat is most noted for compiling a quality football staff in Montreal. His staff went on to capture six Grey Cup Championships. Wally Buono has 3 Grey Cup wins and is the winningest coach in CFL history. Eric Tillman has 2 Grey Cup wins while Dave Ritchie (football coach) has 1 Grey Cup win. Two others on Galat's staff, Chris Palmer was head coach of the Cleveland Browns and was also the Offensive Coach for the Super Bowl champion New York Giants. Tom Rossley served as offensive coordinator with the Green Bay Packers.

Galat's CFL coaching tenure was unsuccessful in terms of results. His Montreal Concordes consistently finished under .500 each year and only made the playoffs once (in 1984). Near the end of the Montreal Concordes 1985 season with the team floundering, Galat, who was also GM of the team, resigned as head coach with two games to go in the season but stayed on as GM. Gary Durchik took over the coaching duties. The following season (1986), in which the Montreal team had returned to its original name of Alouettes, he left the team on August 1 (president Norm Kimball assumed the duties of GM for the rest of the season) to join the BC Lions mid-season as General Manager (taking over from the departed Bobby Ackles), until the conclusion of the 1989 CFL season. With four straight losses to open the 1989 BC Lions season, Galat fired head coach Larry Donovan and named himself interim coach for the final fourteen games. The Lions narrowly missed the postseason to the Saskatchewan Roughriders. Following the disappointing finish, Galat was released as GM of the club and replaced by Joe Kapp.

Galat was inducted into the American Football Association's Semi Pro Football Hall of Fame in 2002.

=== CFL coaching record ===
Team	Year	Regular season					Postseason		
Team	Year	Won	Lost	Ties	Win %	Finish	Won	Lost	Result
MON	1982	2	14	0	.125	4th in East Division	–	–	Missed playoffs
MON	1983	5	10	1	.333	4th in East Division	–	–	Missed playoffs
MON	1984	6	9	1	.400	3rd in East Division	0	1	Lost in Division Semifinals
MON	1985	6	8	0	.429	Resigned mid-season			
BC	1989	7	7	0	.500	4th in West Division	–	–	Missed playoffs
Total		26	48	2	.355	0 Division; Championships	0	1	0 Grey Cups

=== CFL GM record ===
Team	Year	Regular season					Postseason		
Team	Year	Won	Lost	Ties	Win %	Finish	Won	Lost	Result
MON	1983	5	9	1	.367	4th in East Division	–	–	Missed playoffs
MON	1984	6	9	1	.400	3rd in East Division	0	1	Lost in Division Semifinals
MON	1985	8	8	0	.500	2nd in East Division	1	1	Lost in East Final
MON	1986	1	3	0	.250	Resigned mid-season			
BC	1986	7	5	0	.583	2nd in West Division	1	1	Lost in West Final
BC	1987	12	6	0	.667	1st in West Division	0	1	Lost in West Final
BC	1988	10	8	0	.556	3rd in West Division	2	1	Lost in Grey Cup Final
BC	1989	7	11	0	.389	4th in West Division	–	–	Missed playoffs
Total		56	59	2	.487	1 Division; Championship	4	5	0 Grey Cups

== Giving back ==
With his time spent coaching and managing professional and college football teams, Galat volunteered some of his time to attend youth football league functions. When he became president of American Youth Football, Galat's strategy became simple: change the rules and traditions of the game creating unlimited weight divisions and restrict older kids from playing younger age kids. The National Football League works with AYF as a National Youth Football on making the game better for the kids. New England Patriots wide receiver Randy Moss is also giving back to the game as a spokesperson for AYF.

While returning to Montreal for his daughter's admission to McGill University in 1999, Galat was asked by John Gilman, founder and former Chief Executive Officer of FieldTurf, to help introduce the upstart company called FieldTurf, a replication of a grass sports field. Galat called on many NFL and Major College football coaches and general managers. The results of independent research proved that FieldTurf was a safer and more durable surface than a good natural grass field. In addition to his Presidential duties with American Youth Football, Joe Galat currently holds the title of Vice-President of Sales at FieldTurf Tarkett.
