= Norm Fieldgate =

Canadian football player (1932–2020)

No. 75
- Positions: Defensive end, Linebacker

Personal information
- Born: January 12, 1932; Regina, Saskatchewan, Canada
- Died: March 6, 2020 (aged 88); North Vancouver, British Columbia, Canada
- Listed height: 6 ft 2 in (1.88 m)
- Listed weight: 205 lb (93 kg)

Career information
- CJFL: Regina Rams

Career history

Playing
- 1954–1967: BC Lions

Operations
- 1989: BC Lions (President)

Awards and highlights
- Grey Cup Champion (1964); CFL All-Star (1963); 3× CFL West All-Star (1959, 1960, 1963); BC Lions #75 retired
- Canadian Football Hall of Fame (Class of 1979)

William Norman "Mouse" Fieldgate (January 12, 1932 – March 6, 2020) was a Canadian professional football player. Fieldgate played defensive end and linebacker for the Canadian Football League's BC Lions for his entire 14-year career. Born in Regina, Saskatchewan, he is a member of the Canadian Football Hall of Fame, the BC Sports Hall of Fame, and the BC Lions Wall of Fame. Fieldgate's #75 jersey is one of eleven numbers retired by the BC Lions. In 2006, Fieldgate was voted to the Honour Roll of the CFL's top 50 players of the league's modern era by Canadian sports network TSN.

Fieldgate is widely considered one of the best Canadian outside linebackers to have ever played the game. The Norm Fieldgate Trophy, awarded to the most outstanding defensive player in the CFL Western Division, is named in his honour.

== Amateur football career ==
Fieldgate did not play college football, but instead played amateur Canadian football for the Regina Rams of the Canadian Junior Football League.

== Professional football career ==
Following his amateur career, Fieldgate was recruited by CFL legend and first head coach of the BC Lions Annis Stukus, to join the BC Lions for their inaugural, 1954 season. Fieldgate played tight end, defensive end, linebacker, and defensive back for the Lions over his 14-year career, but achieved the most success as a linebacker.

Fieldgate was one of only two "original" Lions with the club when the Lions won their first Grey Cup Championship in 1964 (the other was Fieldgate's teammate By Bailey). Fieldgate was also the longest serving original Lion, with a career that spanned 14 years and 223 games. In the 1959, 1960, and 1963 CFL seasons, Fieldgate was named to the CFL Western Division All-Star Team as a linebacker. In the 1963 CFL season, Fieldgate was also named a CFL All-Star.

In the 1962 CFL season, Fieldgate was honoured with a "Norm Fieldgate Night" by the BC Lions, the second player to receive such an honour. The 1965 CFL season saw Fieldgate win the Bobby Bourne Memorial Trophy as the Lions' "Most Popular Player." Fieldgate was inducted into the BC Sports Hall of Fame in 1970, and was inducted into the Canadian Football Hall of Fame in 1979. In 2003, Fieldgate was voted a member of the BC Lions All-Time Dream Team, at the linebacker position, as part of the club's 50 year anniversary celebration. In November, 2006, Fieldgate was voted to the Honour Roll of the CFL's top 50 players of the league's modern era by Canadian sports network TSN.

== Post-football ==
Following his retirement from the BC Lions in 1967, Fieldgate started his own company, and worked for the BC Lions as president in 1989. He was active with Lions' alumni and charitable events in the greater Vancouver area.
