= Sonny Homer =

Canadian football player (1936–2006)

Profile
- Position: Wide receiver

Personal information
- Born: July 8, 1936; Trail, British Columbia, Canada
- Died: February 22, 2006 (aged 69); North Vancouver, British Columbia, Canada

Career history
- 1958–1968: BC Lions

Awards and highlights
- 52nd Grey Cup champion

Lawrence "Sonny" Homer (July 8, 1936 – February 22, 2006) was a professional Canadian football wide receiver who played eleven seasons in the Canadian Football League for the BC Lions. He was part of the Lions' 1964 Grey Cup victory, his best season when he caught 50 passes for 776 yards (15.5 yards/catch average). He totaled 217 catches in his career for 3,765 yards (17.4 yards/catch average).

Homer played with only one kidney. He died on February 22, 2006, in North Vancouver, British Columbia.
