= Mike Cacic =

Canadian football player (1937–2008)

Profile
- Position: Defensive tackle

Personal information
- Born: January 4, 1937; Vancouver, British Columbia, Canada
- Died: January 22, 2008 (aged 71); Surrey, British Columbia, Canada
- Listed height: 6 ft 4 in (1.93 m)
- Listed weight: 260 lb (118 kg)

Career history
- 1957–1958: BC Lions
- 1960–1967: BC Lions

Awards and highlights
- Grey Cup champion (1964); CFL All-Star (1964); 3× CFL West All-Star (1964, 1965, 1966)

Michael Nicholas Cacic (January 4, 1937 – January 22, 2008) was a former defensive lineman who played 10 years in the Canadian Football League for the British Columbia Lions from 1957 to 1967.

Michael Nicholas Cacic was born in Vancouver to Croatian emigrant parents, Grgur Čačić and Ana Frković. Instead of college football, Cacic played in the junior league in the Lower Mainland near Vancouver, a member of the "head hunters" on defence. In his first years as a Lion, he was plagued by injuries. As a rookie in 1957, he missed the last 4 games due to an ankle injury.

In his second year, he tore ligaments in his knee and so missed the last 4 games in addition to the entire 1959 season. However, starting in 1960, he played all 16 games for 5 out of 6 years and was a western conference all-star from 1964 to 1966. He was part of the Grey cup winning team of 1964. He retired in 1967.

At the end of his career, Cacic was named to the B.C. Lions 50th Anniversary Dream Team and the BC Lions Wall of Fame. His post football career involved working for the New Westminster, British Columbia school board. He spent most of life living in Surrey, British Columbia.
