= Tom Hinton =

American gridiron football player (born 1936)

No. 54
- Position: Guard

Personal information
- Born: 1936 (age 89–90); Ruston, Louisiana, U.S.
- Listed height: 6 ft 0 in (1.83 m)
- Listed weight: 225 lb (102 kg)

Career information
- College: Louisiana Tech
- NFL draft: 1958: 12th round, 135th overall pick

Career history
- 1958–1966: BC Lions

Awards and highlights
- Grey Cup champion (1964); CFL All-Star (1963); 5× CFL West All-Star (1958, 1959, 1963, 1964, 1966)
- Canadian Football Hall of Fame (Class of 1991)

William Thomas Hinton (born 1936) is an American former professional football offensive guard who played nine years for the BC Lions of the Canadian Football League (CFL) from 1958 to 1966. In 1991, he was enshrined into the Canadian Football Hall of Fame.

== College career ==
Hinton attended Louisiana Tech University and was a three-time All-GSC pick and as a senior, he helped lead his team to the Gulf States Conference Championship. He was inducted into the Louisiana Tech University Athletic Hall of Fame in 1987.

== Canadian Football League career ==
Hinton played in all 16 regular season games in 7 of his 9 years with the Lions and finished his career as the best offensive lineman in the team's history. As a rookie in 1958, he made the Western all-star team. In his second year in the CFL, he was chosen the Outstanding Lineman and the Outstanding Player of the CFL. In 1963, Hinton makes both the All-Western and the All-Canadian All-Star teams, and helped lead his team to the Grey Cup. In addition, Hinton was a five time CFL All-Star selection. He was elected into the Canadian Football Hall of Fame on May 11, 1991 and the BC Sports Hall of Fame in 1992.
