= BC Lions =

Canadian Football League team

- Current season
- Logo
- Uniforms

General information
- Founded: 1954
- Stadium: BC Place
- Headquartered: Vancouver, British Columbia, Canada,
- Colours: Black, orange, fog grey, white
- Fight songs: "Roar, You Lions, Roar" composed by Dal Richards and His Orchestra
- Mascot: Leo the Lion & Rory the Lion
- Website: bclions.com

Personnel
- Owner: Amar Doman
- General manager: Ryan Rigmaiden
- Head coach: Buck Pierce

Nickname
- Leos

Home fields
- Empire Stadium (1954–1982); BC Place (1983–2009, 2011–present); Empire Field (2010–2011)

League / conference affiliations
- Canadian Football League: West Division

Championships
- Grey Cup wins: 6 (1964, 1985, 1994, 2000, 2006, 2011)

The BC Lions are a professional Canadian football team based in Vancouver, British Columbia. The Lions compete in the West Division of the Canadian Football League (CFL), and play their home games at BC Place.

The Lions played their first season in 1954, and have played every season since, making them the oldest professional sports franchise in British Columbia. They have appeared in the league's Grey Cup championship game 10 times, winning six, with their most recent championship occurring in 2011.

The Lions were the first Western Canadian team to win the Grey Cup at home, doing so in 1994 and 2011, before Saskatchewan achieved the feat in 2013. Also in 1994, the Lions became the first and only team to play and defeat an American-based franchise for the Grey Cup. The Lions hold the second-longest playoff streak in CFL history, making the postseason 20 consecutive seasons, from 1997 to 2016 (only Edmonton has had a longer playoff streak, going 34 seasons from 1972 to 2005). With the Winnipeg Blue Bombers Grey Cup win in 2019 after a 29-year wait, the Lions currently have the longest Grey Cup drought of the West Division teams, and the longest drought since appearing the Grey Cup, last playing and winning in 2011.

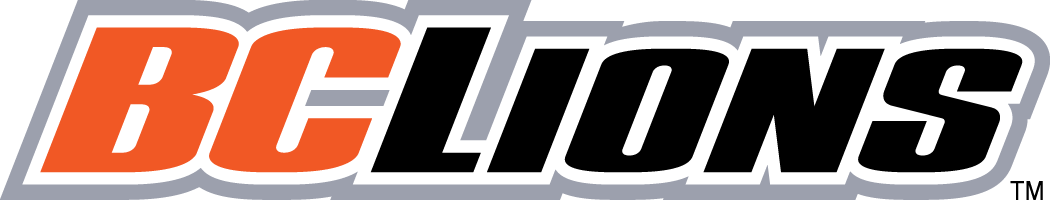
Team wordmark 2005–2015

== History ==
=== Before the Lions ===
Compared to the rest of the country, senior football arrived late in British Columbia. Rugby unions had been organized in all of the Prairie provinces by 1907 and the Western Canada Rugby Football Union had been formed in 1911.

However, it was not until 1926 (after the sudden collapse of the Western Hockey League) that the British Columbia Rugby Football Union was formed, and not until 1930 that the BCRFU competed to represent the West in the Grey Cup. The black and orange Vancouver Meralomas were the most successful British Columbian team of the era. They played in the Western Final in 1930 and again in 1934, only to lose on both occasions to the Regina Roughriders of the Saskatchewan Rugby Football Union.

The BCRFU stopped challenging for the Grey Cup following the formation of the Western Interprovincial Football Union. After the BCRFU disbanded in 1941, the Vancouver Grizzlies joined the WIFU. They played only one season, finishing 1–7, before the WIFU suspended operations for the duration of the Second World War. The Grizzlies did not return after the war.

=== Origin of the Lions ===
In 1951, a group led by Ken Stauffer and Tiny Radar were inspired by Vancouver Sun columnist Andy Lytle's article to start a new football team in Vancouver that would play in the WIFU. The ownership group sent Radar and Orville Burke to represent them at the off-season WIFU meetings to initiate Vancouver's bid for a team. Radar and Burke were told to return to the meetings the following year with a $25,000 good-faith bond if they could generate sufficient interest in the Vancouver area. The first meetings were held at the Arctic Club in November and a committee headed by Burke and Harry Spring of the Meraloma Rugby Club, set out to sell memberships for $20 each.

Though Burke, Vic Spencer, and John Davidson offered the good-faith bond to the WIFU in 1952, the idea of having a Vancouver team was rejected when both Winnipeg and Saskatchewan voted against the idea of a fifth team. The group in Vancouver, however, did not give up their efforts to have a franchise in the WIFU.

On January 22, 1953, the first annual meeting of the club was held, and Arthur E. Mercer was confirmed as the club's first president. Later in the year, Mercer, Bill Morgan, Bill Ralston, and Whit Matthews went back to the WlFU meetings. One of the founding members included Indo-Canadian businessman, Jab Sidhoo. This time, they sold the idea of a fifth Western team, and Vancouver was granted a conditional franchise. They were required to provide a 15,000-seat stadium, sell at least 6,500 season tickets, and guarantee travel expenses for the visiting teams.

All the pieces began to fall into place when it was announced that Vancouver would host the 1954 British Empire and Commonwealth Games. That entailed the building of Empire Stadium, which seated 32,300 people and would be more than suitable for the new WIFU team once the Games concluded. By Easter of 1953, Annis Stukus was then lured away from the Toronto Argonauts to return to the West to become the first public relations manager, general manager, and head coach of the franchise.

=== Naming the team ===
During the rest of 1953, a fan contest was held by all of the local media to pick the new team's name. Lions was chosen because it represented a local landmark and legend of the area. The Lions are twin mountain peaks that rise northwest of Vancouver, and according to legend, resemble two mountain lions (cougars) guarding the city.

After the name was chosen, Stukus decided that the team should represent and embrace the entire province of British Columbia, introducing the team to the Canadian football world as the British Columbia Lions or "BC Lions" for short.

Native to British Columbia, the mountain lion was chosen as part of the team’s branding. According to the team, the animal symbolizes qualities such as speed, courage, and strength. The team’s logo combines the mountain lion with the black and orange colours of the Meralomas.

==== Indigenous recognition ====
Indigenous logo created by Corrine Hunt in 2021 to bring attention to the Every Child Matters movement.

In 2021, the Lions embarked on a special project to commemorate Indigenous residential schools and missing children by recognizing Orange Shirt Day, later known as the National Day of Truth and Reconciliation. Kwakwaka’wakw/Tlingit artist Corrine Hunt created a rendition of the team's logo in an Indigenous design to call attention to the families and survivors. This marked this first time attention was brought to the movement by a CFL team. The Edmonton Elks followed suit shortly afterward. The remaining teams joined in the recognition in 2023 and 2024 with redesigned logos of their own.

== Notable seasons ==
The BC Lions have won 13 Western Conference/West Division regular-season championships and played for the Grey Cup 10 times, winning six.

=== First seasons (1954–1960) ===
For their inaugural season in 1954, Stukus sold football fever on the streets of Vancouver. The team made history when they stepped on the field of Empire Stadium for their first home game, against the Winnipeg Blue Bombers, on Saturday, August 28, 1954. Fullback By Bailey scored the first touchdown in franchise history in an 8–6 loss. The first Lions win came on September 18, 1954, with Bailey scoring the winning touchdown to overtake the Calgary Stampeders 9–4. Fans celebrated in the streets, but it turned out to be their only win, as the Lions went 1–15 for the year.

In 1955, the team improved to a 5–11 record, eking out fourth place ahead of Calgary, but missing the playoffs. In October, the team's directors asked Stukus to step down as the team's head coach. While fan reaction to his dismissal was loud and divided, Stukus asked the fans to continue their support of the BC Lions. Stukus' assistant Clem Crowe was later named head coach for the upcoming 1956 season.

In 1956, the Lions again finished fourth in the West and missed the playoffs, despite improving to 6–10 in Crowe's first year.

During the offseason, Bill McMahan assumed the role of team president. One of his first duties involved him bringing back Kelowna native Herb Capozzi from the Montreal Alouettes as the new general manager. BC continued to struggle on the field, finishing the 1957 season with a 4–11–1 record, missing the playoffs for the fourth straight year.

1958 marked the beginning of the CFL era, but the Lions lost their first 5 games, en route to a league-worst 3–13 record. The team's on-field struggles compelling Capozzi to fire Crowe as the head coach and replace him with Danny Edwards, who returned after playing with the club during the 1957 season. Although it was a season to forget, rookies Tom Hinton and Sonny Homer showed promising signs of being future football stars.

Capozzi improved the team for the 1959 season, first by hiring Wayne Robinson, from Winnipeg, as the new head coach, then bringing in a corps of veteran players to add more experience to the team. This was followed by signing rookie running back Willie "the Wisp" Fleming, adding more youth to play alongside Hinton and Homer. Capozzi's moves proved successful. By winning their final regular season game, at home, over Calgary, the 1959 Lions managed both their first winning season, with a 9–7–0 record, first playoff appearance. The postseason ended with two straight losses to the Edmonton Eskimos, but the team's future looked bright heading into the 1960s.

The high hopes of the Lions heading into 1960 faded and the team finished with a 5–9–2 record, which eliminated them from playoff contention again. It was disappointing considering the addition of rookie talents Steve Cotter, Lonnie Dennis, Jim Carphin, and Neal Beaumont to a strong core of veteran and young players from the previous season. The only positive for the Lions was Beaumont winning WIFU Outstanding Rookie of the Year honors, becoming the first Lions player to win a major CFL award.

=== Dave Skrien and the first Grey Cup title (1961–1967) ===
The Lions started the 1961 season by signing former Minnesota Golden Gopher Tom Brown, but the team continued performing poorly on the field.

In September, in a trade that was considered a major gamble, the Lions received quarterback Joe Kapp from Calgary, in exchange for four players. A week later, Robinson was relieved of his duties as head coach and replaced by assistant Dave Skrien. The year ended with a 1–13–2 record.

In 1962, Skrien made an immediate impact in his first full season as head coach, finishing with a 7–9 record. After eight years of hard work, the Lions were on the verge of success for the first time.

==== 1963 Grey Cup finalists ====
Before the 1963 season, there was optimism that the Lions could contend for the Grey Cup. With a veteran roster headlined by Kapp and Fleming, the Lions surged to their first regular-season conference title with a 12–4 record. After a 2–1 series victory over the Saskatchewan Roughriders in the Western Conference finals, the Lions lined up in the 51st Grey Cup, held at Empire Stadium, against the Hamilton Tiger-Cats. However, their momentum stalled as a series of injuries in the championship game affected the team's performance. Star running back Fleming was hurt after he received a late, out-of-bounds hit by Tiger-Cat defensive tackle Angelo Mosca. This proved to be a huge blow to the Lions' chances of victory. Hamilton took the Grey Cup, 21–10.

In the offseason, Kapp was awarded the Jeff Nicklin Memorial Trophy as most valuable player of the Western Conference, Tom Brown won the CFL's Most Outstanding Defensive Player Award, and Skrien won the Annis Stukus Trophy as coach of the year, the first time any of those three awards had been handed to Lions players. Fullback-kicker Peter Kempf became the second Lion to win the Dr. Beattie Martin Trophy for rookie of the year honours in the Western Conference.

==== 1964 Grey Cup champions ====
After achieving an 11–2–3 regular season record in 1964, and defeating the Calgary Stampeders in a three-game series in the Western Conference finals, the Lions advanced to meet the Hamilton Tiger-Cats in a Grey Cup rematch at Toronto's Exhibition Stadium. BC got their revenge, as Kapp, Fleming, and Bill Munsey, who gave a two-touchdown, two-way starring effort, helped the Lions to their first Grey Cup victory, 34–24. The win ended 11 years of waiting for the British Columbia faithful. At the end of the 1964 season, defensive lineman Tom Brown was named a CFL All-Star, a back-to-back Schenley Award winner as CFL's Most Outstanding Lineman Award, and won the Jeff Nicklin Memorial Trophy as the most valuable player in the Western Conference. Joining Brown as All-Stars on defence were Mike Cacic, Dick Fouts, and Munsey. Kapp and tackle Lonnie Dennis were named CFL All-Stars on offence.

During the offseason, Bailey left, and the roster was beginning to age. Any hopes of the BC Lions becoming a dynasty quickly disappeared in 1965, as the team fell to fourth in the west with a 6–9–1 record, missing the playoffs one year after being on top of the CFL world. It was clear that head coach Skrien would never again experience the same success as he achieved the previous two seasons.

The situation went from bad to worse in 1966, as the Lions posted a 5–11 record. Capozzi was fired as general manager after nine seasons, and just two years after taking the franchise to consecutive Grey Cup appearances. Fleming and Tom Hinton retired, and Kapp left the team to continue his playing career in the NFL with the Minnesota Vikings.

In the 1967 season, Denny Veitch became the new general manager of the club. His first move was to fire Skrien after three straight losses to start the season. Veitch named Jim Champion as head coach, and the Lions ended up finishing the season with a 3–12–1 record. The only positives for the club were two rookies; wide receiver Jim Young and kicker Ted Gerela, who ended up winning the Dr. Beattie Martin Trophy as the Western Conference's rookie of the year.

=== Instability at coach (1968–1976) ===
Following Skrien's departure, the Lions went through five head coaches between 1968 and 1976, qualifying for the playoffs only three times. Champion remained as head coach in 1968, and CFL legend Jackie Parker was hired as an assistant coach, and even came out of retirement for eight games at quarterback. The Lions finished the season with a 4–11–1 record, again missing the playoffs.

Eleven games into the 1969 season, with a 1–10 record, Champion was fired as head coach and replaced by assistant Jackie Parker. The Lions responded by winning four of their last five games to finish 5–11, tied with Edmonton. By virtue of winning the season series, BC won the tie breaker and squeezed into the playoffs, where they fell to the Stampeders, in Calgary, 35–21 in the semifinal. Individually, Dave Easley won CFL and Western Division rookie of the year honours, and Young was a Schenley finalist.

In 1970, the first artificial turf field in Canada was installed, at Empire Stadium (3M's Tartan Turf). Young became the first Lion to win the Schenley Outstanding Canadian Award, while the team finished fourth place in the Western Conference at 6–10, and missed the playoffs.

The 1971 season began with a major off-season restructuring that saw head coach Parker elevated to general manager, and replaced by former Saskatchewan coach Eagle Keys. Don Moorhead was recruited at quarterback, and a total of fifty-three different players put on a Lions uniform in a year of change, including movie and TV personality Carl Weathers at linebacker. Running back Jim Evenson finished the season with 1,237 yards to lead the Western Conference in rushing, and won the Eddie James Memorial Trophy. The Lions again finished the season at fourth place in the West Division with a 6–9–1 record, missing the playoffs for a second consecutive year. Parker became the first Lion player inducted into the Canadian Football Hall of Fame.

In 1972, the Lions added new players such as defensive back Rocky Long, running back Johnny Musso, linebacker Ray Nettles and centre Al Wilson, but finished fifth in their division with a 5–11 record. Young won his second Schenley Award as outstanding Canadian.

The Lions' fortunes improved during the 1973 season, as they posted a 5–9–2 record, good enough for a third-place finish in the Western Conference and a playoff berth, their first in four years. The Lions lost in the semi-finals to the Saskatchewan Roughriders 33–13. Linebacker Nettles won the CFL's Outstanding Defensive Player Award.

In 1974, the Lions showed continued improvement in posting an 8–8 record, and returned to the playoffs for the second straight year. They faced familiar foe Saskatchewan in the semi-finals, where they lost again, 24–14. Second-year running back Lou Harris replaced injured Musso to lead the Lions in both rushing and receiving, winning CFL All-Star honours in the process. Stukus became the first Lion inducted into the Canadian Football Hall of Fame as a builder.

The Lions began the 1975 season with a change at quarterback, as Eric Guthrie and Peter Liske platooned at the position, replacing Moorhead. They lost five of their first six games before a major change was announced in August. General manager Parker and head coach Keys were both dismissed, with Bob Ackles moving up from his assistant general manager post and Cal Murphy elevated to head coach. The Lions played .500 football the rest of the season, but finished in fifth place in their division with a 6–10 record.

The Lions' 1976 season concluded with a 5–9–2 fourth-place finish. Individually, Sciarra became the second Lion to win the Schenley Award as the CFL's most outstanding rookie, while Bill Baker won the Schenley Defensive Player Award. Harry Spring became the second Lion inducted into the Hall of Fame as a builder. Rookies and local talents, linebacker Glen Jackson and punter-kicker Lui Passaglia were two other bright spots in an otherwise disappointing season.

=== Returning to contention (1977–1982) ===
BC Lions logo design (1976–2024)

A complete off-season overhaul in the coaching staff brought Edmonton Eskimos assistant Vic Rapp in as the 10th head coach of the Lions as they opened their 1977 season. A revamped Leos lineup included rookies Leon Bright, John Blain, Ken Hinton, and quarterback Jerry Tagge, as well as several newly acquired veterans. The Lions last-minute heroics earned them the nickname, the "Cardiac Kids." They finished with a 10–6 record, good enough for second place in the Western Division—the first time the Lions had finished with a winning record since the Grey Cup year of 1964. BC opened the playoffs with a 33–32 upset of Winnipeg at home before being trounced 38–1 in Edmonton by the Eskimos in the Western Division final. Wide receiver Leon Bright captured the CFL's Most Outstanding Rookie award, and Al Wilson became the first Lion to win the CFL's Most Outstanding Offensive Lineman Award.

In 1978, the Lions finished the season at 7–7–2 and in fourth place in their division. Rookie running backs John Henry White and Larry Key provided a much improved rushing game, but depth was still the missing ingredient, as the Leos missed the playoffs. 1978 also saw the emergence of rookie quarterback Joe Paopao, the "Throwin' Samoan."

The Lions' 1979 season began with Tagge at quarterback, but his season—and his career—were ended by a knee injury. Led by Joe Paopao, the Lions skidded down the stretch, losing five games in a row. Despite this, the team finished third in the Western Conference with a 9–6–1 record, making the playoffs. In the semi-finals, the Lions were blasted 37–2 by the Calgary Stampeders. Jim Young retired at the end of the season, and Norm Fieldgate became the second Lions player to be inducted into the Canadian Football Hall of Fame. Rising costs and an aging Empire Stadium cast a shadow over future prospects. To head off a crisis, the directors, led by past-president Jack Farley, developed a plan to sell stock and seek a strong partnership with a major corporate sponsor to keep operations viable while waiting for the construction of a new stadium in downtown Vancouver.

The Lions failed to make the playoffs in 1980, despite a winning record of 8–7–1. Off the field, the decision was made to begin construction of a new indoor stadium in downtown Vancouver.

In 1981, the Lions returned to the playoffs with a third-place divisional finish and a 10–6 record. The team qualified for the playoffs on the final weekend of the season with a victory over the Saskatchewan Roughriders in a driving rainstorm at Empire Stadium. The key play was a late fourth-quarter fumble by Saskatchewan fullback Greg Fieger at the Rider two-yard line which the Lions recovered. The Lions turned this into a touchdown two plays later to take the lead for good after Saskatchewan had led for most of the game up to that point. In the playoffs, the Lions again upset the Blue Bombers 15–11 in the semi-finals before losing 22–16 in the Western Division final to eventual Grey Cup champion Edmonton. Paopao and second-year quarterback Roy Dewalt had wide-out Ty Grey as their deep-threat receiver, while rookie defensive back Larry Crawford led the CFL in interceptions. The Labatt Brewing Company became the Lions' major sponsor in a marketing agreement that brought much-needed financial stability to the team.

Standout wide receiver "Swervin'" Mervyn Fernandez was among the rookies who joined the Lions in 1982, winning the Jackie Parker Trophy as the Western Division's most outstanding rookie. Despite a 9–7 record, the Lions finished fourth in their division and failed to make the playoffs. As in the previous four seasons, the Lions got off to a fast start only to stumble badly after Labour Day. In most cases after this point in the season, the Lions lost crucial divisional games by a very large margin. Due to this disturbing trend, head coach Vic Rapp and his entire coaching staff were dismissed at the end of the season. Lions' running back great Willie "The Wisp" Fleming was inducted into the Canadian Football Hall of Fame.

=== A New Home, the New Western powerhouse (1983–1987) ===
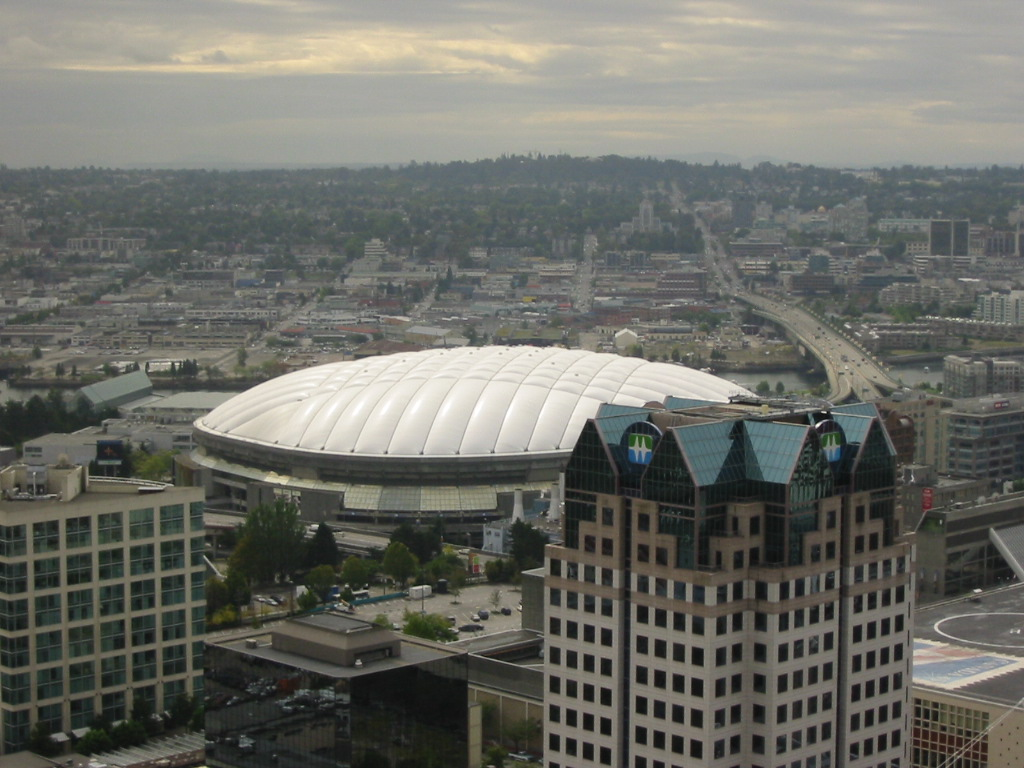
BC Place Stadium, 2003

In January of the 1983 CFL season, former Edmonton defensive coordinator Don Matthews was named BC's new head coach. The Lions also moved into the domed BC Place Stadium, their new home stadium, which opened in June 1983. The quarterback-receiver combination of Dewalt to Fernandez led the Lions' attack, while the defence set a new CFL record of 42 interceptions. The Lions finished 11–5 for the second-best record in team history and returned to first place for the first time since the 1964 season. They stormed into the playoffs, defeating Winnipeg in the Western Division finals, 39–21. The Western Division champions hosted the Toronto Argonauts in the 71st Grey Cup, ending a 19-year absence from the classic. BC Place fans watched the Argonauts defeat their hometown team in a taut 18–17 contest.

In 1984, the Lions' biggest trade since the Joe Kapp deal brought CFL All-Star James "Quick" Parker to their defence from Edmonton. The Lions again finished first in the Western Division with a league-leading 12–3–1 record, but the second straight first-place finish was dampened by the late-season loss of quarterback Roy Dewalt to injury. In a repeat Western finals matchup at BC Place, Winnipeg triumphed 31–14 and went on to win their first Grey Cup since 1962. Average crowds in excess of 40,000 in each of the first two years at BC Place reversed the team's financial fortunes, with stockholders receiving early repayment. Lions greats Joe Kapp and linebacker Tom Brown were inducted into the Canadian Football Hall of Fame.

==== 1985 Grey Cup champions ====
The Lions' 1985 season began with much promise. Mervyn Fernandez shattered several team receiving records and second-year receiver Jim Sandusky broke the 1,000 yard mark. Rookie defensive tackle Mike Gray was the most visible of several rookies. With depth and few injuries, the final season record of 13–3 was the best in team history, bringing the Lions their third consecutive first-place divisional finish. The Lions avenged their prior year's playoff defeat by beating Winnipeg 42–22. One week later, the same Lions line-up met Hamilton at the Olympic Stadium in Montreal. Twenty-one years of waiting ended with a 37–24 Grey Cup championship victory over the Tiger-Cats in the 73rd Grey Cup. Quarterback Roy Dewalt won the Grey Cup's Most Valuable Player award on offence, while defensive end James "Quick" Parker took home the Grey Cup's Most Valuable Player award on defence. Kicker Lui Passaglia was named the Grey Cup's Most Valuable Canadian. Don Matthews won his first CFL Coach of the Year award. Mervyn Fernandez became the first Lion to win the CFL's Most Outstanding Player Award and defensive tackle Mike Gray won both the CFL's Most Outstanding Rookie award and the Jackie Parker Trophy. Linebacker Tyrone Crews won the first of two consecutive CFL Players Association Outstanding Community Service Awards. The CFL champions returned to Vancouver for a victory celebration that swept across the entire province.

Defending their championship in 1986 proved even harder than winning it the year before, as the Lions battled the Eskimos, Blue Bombers, injuries, and the CFL's newly extended 18-game regular season. The Lions reached the halfway mark at 7–2 losing at Edmonton, and at home to Calgary. The Lions then ran their record to 9–2 before hitting a four-game losing streak, started by back-to-back losses to Edmonton. The Lions rebounded to win back-to-back games against Winnipeg to finish the season 12–6, and second in the Western Division. Under the new playoff format, the Lions met the Bombers for a third straight week, winning the Semi-Finals 21–14, before travelling to Edmonton for the Lions' first Western final road game in four years. The Lions lost their fourth game of the year to the Eskimos 41–5, ending the Lions' hopes of defending their title in front of a home crowd at BC Place. The 1985 Grey Cup title, the prospect of defending the title at home, and the excitement in the area generated from Expo 86 helped the Lions outdraw the Vancouver Canucks in total attendance in 1986, despite the fact the Lions had only nine regular-season home games compared to the Canucks' 40. Off the field, the big news of the year was the departure of general manager Bob Ackles to the NFL's Dallas Cowboys, ending Ackles' 33-year association with the Lions (he returned in 2002). Ackles was replaced by former Montreal general manager Joe Galat in August 1986.

The Lions began their 1987 campaign without the services of stand-out wide receiver Mervyn Fernandez, who left during the offseason to join the Los Angeles Raiders. The season began with a four-game winning streak, but the team seemed to lose focus through the middle of the season, looking invincible in one game and lethargic the next. Entering the last half of the year, the Lions were still in contention for first place but not playing like a team driving for a title. When the team suffered a three-game losing streak, general manager Joe Galat fired Don Matthews, the winningest coach in Lions history with just four games to go. The Lions instantly responded to new coach Larry Donovan, winning the final four games including a thrilling come-from-behind 33–32 victory over Edmonton at Commonwealth Stadium that many observers called the CFL's greatest comeback ever. The win gave the Lions first place in the Western Division for the fourth time in five years with a 12–6 record. Home field advantage at BC Place in the Western final was not enough however, as the Lions fell to the eventual Grey Cup champion Eskimos, 31–7.

=== Fading into mediocrity (1988–1992) ===
The CFL's competition cap forced the Lions to start the 1988 season with 22 new faces in their lineup, one of which was star quarterback Matt Dunigan, acquired in a trade with Edmonton. Despite the large number of new players, the Lions jelled and finished the regular season with a 10–8 record. The Lions entered the playoffs with momentum and were touted as Grey Cup favourites. The Leos managed hard-earned playoff victories on the road against the Saskatchewan Roughriders, beating them 42–18 in the semi-final, before defeating the Eskimos in the Western Division final at Commonwealth Stadium, 37–19; it marked their first playoff win over the Eskimos in their history. That set the stage for the 76th Grey Cup Championship Game against the Blue Bombers, in front of a crowd in excess of 50,000 in unseasonably mild but windy conditions at Ottawa. The lead changed hands several times during the hard-fought contest. The Leos drove to the Winnipeg seven-yard line in the final minutes only to have Matt Dunigan's pass deflected by two defenders and intercepted to snuff out the drive. The Bombers went on to win the Cup, 22–21.

Buoyed by their Grey Cup appearance the previous season, the Lions entered the 1989 season with much optimism. However, the team opened the campaign with a loss to Edmonton in Commonwealth Stadium, followed by three more losses before coach Larry Donovan was fired and replaced by general manager Joe Galat. After dropping their fifth straight game to the Eskimos, the Lions put together a four-game winning streak, fuelling playoff hopes. The Winnipeg Blue Bombers shattered those hopes in back-to-back games, rolling over the Leos 53–34 in Winnipeg, and then edging the Lions 24–20 in an overtime contest in Vancouver. Prior to the Winnipeg home game on September 16, new owner Murray Pezim (who had bought the team from community ownership on September 7) and his minority partners, ex-NFL all-star Mark Gastineau and his wife Brigitte Nielsen were introduced to the home fans. The Lions never did get back on track, finishing the year with a disappointing 7–11 record, and missing the playoffs for the first time since 1982. Bright spots included running back Darrell Wallace, who won the Western Division's Jackie Parker Trophy as Most Outstanding Rookie (Wallace was second in the CFL in total offensive yardage), and quarterback Matt Dunigan who won the CFL Players Association Outstanding Community Service Award. Dunigan was traded (in another seven-to-one trade) to the Toronto Argonauts after the 1989 season ended.

In 1990, Pezim's first full season as owner, he made big changes to the look of the team. The team ditched its predominantly orange and white uniform design to black with silver helmets and pants. Under new head coach Lary Kuharich and general manager Joe Kapp, the Lions generated a good deal of preseason hype in 1990 with the signings of West Virginia University quarterback Major Harris, who was fourth in 1989 Heisman Trophy balloting, and quarterback Doug Flutie. Minority owner Mark Gastineau even returned to active duty, but was released after playing only four games. However, the publicity did not translate into on-field victories and turmoil plagued the team. Two coaches left early in the season amid controversy. The Lions tied their first game against Calgary in the dying seconds of the contest as Doug Flutie tossed a "hail Mary" pass to Ray Alexander in the end zone. The Lions kept close in every game, winning a tight one against Winnipeg at home on a last-second Passaglia field goal, while losing to Hamilton in the final seconds in the next contest. The eastern road trip to the Ottawa Rough Riders and Toronto Argonauts, during which the Lions lost both games, spelled the beginning of the end for the new coach and general manager. The following week, the Leos dropped another one to the Argos, 49–19, and one week after that, another former Lions great, Jim "Dirty Thirty" Young, was behind the bench as interim head coach. Bob O'Billovich took over as vice president of football operations and head coach on September 14, 1990, and promptly guided the team to a strong 34–4 victory over Hamilton. The Lions gained stability as the season wore on, and although they missed the playoffs, "Obie's" charges went 4–3 over the last seven games of the season, and their strong finish fuelled hopes for a much brighter 1991 season. Highlights of the year included Lui Passaglia's new professional football scoring record, as he booted his 2,238th point, finishing the year with 2,312 points. Lui also became the longest-playing Lion in history, appearing in a total of 236 games, overtaking Al Wilson's previous mark of 233 games.

The 1991 season opened with promise. Although the team dropped a 39–34 decision to Calgary at BC Place, the game was tight and the Lions were in the contest to the very end. It was a harbinger as Bob O'Billovich's young team with 12 rookies in the lineup, turned virtually every contest into a nail-biter, playing in a CFL record six overtime contests, winning three and losing three. Behind the outstanding quarterbacking of Doug Flutie, the powerful running of rookie Jon Volpe, the receiving of rookie Matt Clark and veteran Ray Alexander, the Lions were capable of beating any team in the CFL. On August 1, 1991, the 2–1 Lions faced the undefeated Toronto Argonauts featuring Raghib "the Rocket" Ismail, at BC Place Stadium. A huge crowd of 53,527 was on hand. After falling behind 21–3 in the first quarter, the Lions battled back and took control of the game in the final quarter. Toronto managed to tie the game but in overtime, but an electrifying kickoff return for a touchdown by Raymond Ethridge and terrific play by the Lions' special teams spelled the difference. The Lions triumphed 52–41 in overtime. However, the following week, Calgary stopped the Leos, 34–30 in overtime. The Lions offence led the CFL in 11 different categories and the team was in a three-way battle with Calgary and Edmonton for first place in the Western Division, right down to the end of the season. In the last game, the Lions hosted the 2–15 Hamilton Tiger-Cats, needing a win to clinch first place. However, the Lions lost and finished third with an 11–7 record. In the Western semi-final in Calgary, the Leos took a commanding 31–15 lead by the end of the first half. Although the Lions had never lost a game all year when leading at the half, Calgary stormed back with an incredible third quarter, scoring four touchdowns, and holding off the Lions to win, 43–41. The disappointing loss was at least partially offset by the awarding of three Lions with outstanding player awards. Doug Flutie was named the CFL's Outstanding Player, Jon Volpe won the CFL's Outstanding Rookie award as well as the West Division's Jackie Parker Trophy and the Eddie James Memorial Trophy for leading the division in rushing. Offensive tackle Jim Mills became the CFL's Outstanding Offensive Lineman and the West Division's DeMarco-Becket Memorial Trophy award winner for the second consecutive year. Although quarterback Doug Flutie signed as a free agent with the Stampeders in the post-season, the acquisition of his replacement from Calgary, Danny Barrett, prior to training camp, brought hope of good things to come in 1992.

The Lions entered training camp for the 1992 CFL season with high expectations. Despite the loss of Doug Flutie, two-time Grey Cup finalist quarterback Danny Barrett was counted on to be an able replacement. In the season opener against the Edmonton Eskimos, however, Barrett struggled, eventually giving way to back-up Tony Kimbrough in the second half. The Eskimos went on to win, 37–26. The following week, the Lions' fortunes continued to spiral downward, this time, on the road, as the Toronto Argonauts crushed the Leos, 61–20. In the third game of the year against Doug Flutie and the Calgary Stampeders, Barrett, who had regained his starting job at quarterback, went down in the third quarter with a separated shoulder. Flutie then guided Calgary to a 37–19 win, and the Lions slid further downhill from there. The team lost eight straight before finally edging out Ottawa 33–27 on September 3, 1992, with Danny Barrett back at the helm. To add insult to injury, off-season and off-field problems emerged to swing focus from football to ownership, as Lions' owner Murray Pezim declared bankruptcy, and the CFL was forced to take over the team. Three weeks later, a new owner was found, as The Brick Furniture Store owner Bill Comrie purchased the Lions from the CFL on September 23, 1992. The team on the field did not respond to the newfound ownership stability, losing the final seven games of the year to finish the season with a disappointing 3–15 record. Head coach O'Billovich and his staff were fired at season's end, and on December 12, 1992, new general manager Eric Tillman announced the hiring of Ottawa defensive coordinator Dave Ritchie, as the new head coach of the Lions.

=== Another Grey Cup (1993–1995) ===
The "new" 1993 edition of the BC Lions, under the guidance of head coach Dave Ritchie and general manager Eric Tillman signed a number of proven CFL veterans, including Danny McManus, James "Wild" West, Rob Smith, Less Browne, Tyrone Jones, Sean Foudy and CFL All-Star Vic Stevenson, winner of the 1992 DeMarco-Beckett Trophy as the Outstanding Offensive Lineman in the West Division. The team also added promising rookies, such as running back Cory Philpot, draft pick Tom Europe, and Derek Grier. A contract dispute with Jon Volpe kept him from training camp, but he was back in the fold by the second game of the season. The Lions struck quickly with wins over the Saskatchewan Roughriders and Toronto Argonauts before grinding to a halt in Winnipeg after only three days rest between road games. However, the Leos lost only two more games through July, August, and mid-September, cruising to an 8–3 record, the Lions' best start since 1987. Quarterback Danny Barrett broke the CFL's single-game passing yard record, completing 30 passes for 601 yards, eclipsing the previous mark of 586 yards set back in 1954 by Montreal Alouettes legend, Sam "The Rifle" Etcheverry. The Lions entered the September 18, 1993 game against the Calgary Stampeders in a battle for first place in the Western Division. However, Doug Flutie and the Stamps prevailed, 40–21. The Lions went on to win only two of the next seven games, sliding to a 64–27 pounding against Sacramento in the regular-season finale, for a 10–8 finish. Nevertheless, the Lions made the playoffs after a one-year absence, facing Calgary in the West Division semi-final game on November 14, 1993. Despite generating twice as much offence as the Stamps, the Leos could not score a touchdown and fell 17–9.

==== 1994 Grey Cup champions ====
The Lions entered the 1994 campaign with a new quarterback, Kent Austin, at the helm. Off-season trades with the Ottawa Rough Riders provided offensive guard Denny Chronopoulos, defensive lineman Andrew Stewart, and rush linebacker Angelo Snipes. A group of young, unknown, and aggressive linebackers emerged at training camp, Henry Newby, Tyrone Chatman, and Virgil Robertson, while the secondary was strengthened with the additions of Charles Gordon and Enis Jackson. The Lions opened the season at B.C. Place and gave the fans a taste of things to come with a hard-fought 24–20 victory over Winnipeg. The Lions offensive power was amply demonstrated the following week with a 57–18 thumping of Ottawa. By the end of August, 1994, the Lions were 7–1–0, and had broken several single-game offensive records, including a 67–15 point record win over Shreveport. The Leos' secondary was further bolstered by the signing of former NFL stars James Jefferson (who was also a one-time CFL star) and Barry Wilburn. The team endured a dry spell at the season's midpoint, losing close games to Winnipeg, Edmonton, Saskatchewan, and the Baltimore Stallions. A late-season win over Las Vegas (45–7) and a close 24–23 loss to Calgary, gave the Lions new hope heading into the playoffs, as well as an 11–6–1 regular-season finish. The team travelled to Edmonton for the Western Division Semi-Finals, where the Lions had only managed one playoff victory at Commonwealth Stadium. With just over four minutes left in the game, defensive back Charles Gordon's miraculous end-zone interception stopped the Eskimos in their tracks and gave new life to the Lions. Quarterback Kent Austin, replacing an injured Danny McManus who had started the game, mounted a Lions' drive which ate up the clock and the field. Lui Passaglia kicked the winning field goal with 30 seconds left to give the Lions a tough 24–23 come-from-behind victory. The following week, in one of the most memorable CFL games ever, the Lions and Doug Flutie's Stampeders traded touchdowns and field goals all night at McMahon Stadium. In the swirling snow with two minutes left in the game, Calgary, who led by 5 points, set up to kick a field goal. Lions' wide receiver Ray Alexander leapt up and made an amazing block, giving the Lions renewed hope and decent field position. Danny McManus, who had replaced Kent Austin in the second half after Austin re-injured a separated shoulder, staged a furious last-minute drive, hitting receivers all the way down the field to the Stampeder's four-yard line. With Calgary leading 36–31, with four seconds left in the game, McManus found receiver Darren Flutie alone in the end zone to give the Lions their first playoff victory over Calgary in 30 years, and a berth in the Grey Cup against Baltimore at B.C. Place. The dramatics continued the following week in the 82nd Grey Cup. With 55,097 cheering fans looking on, the Lions and Stallions staged another thriller with both teams playing great football. Baltimore took a 17–10 lead at halftime, and extended their lead to 20–10 early in the third quarter. Lions' quarterback Danny McManus entered the game and staged a second-half rally. Seemingly stalled at the Baltimore 30 yard line, Lui Passaglia and Darren Flutie staged a fake field goal to gain a big first down, which changed the momentum of the game. McManus ran in from the two-yard line to tie the score at 20–20. After the teams traded field goals to make the score 23–23, McManus engineered another late-game drive to the Baltimore 37 yard line. Passaglia missed the field goal with just over one minute remaining, but the Lions' defence rose up to deny Baltimore and stop them cold within their own five-yard line. After a punt and a couple of runs to set up another field goal try, Passaglia converted a field goal with no time remaining on the clock to give the Lions an incredible 26–23 victory, the third Grey Cup championship in the team's history. Passaglia went on to win a well-deserved Grey Cup Most Valuable Canadian award for his heroics.

The 1995 season began with Grey Cup hero Danny McManus named as starting quarterback, replacing Kent Austin, who was traded to Toronto. Shelton Quarles was added to a strong linebacker corps. The season started with an exciting, late come-from-behind 37–34 victory over the Baltimore Stallions at BC Place. The Lions won their first three games before suffering a setback in Calgary. The Leos got back on track with a strong performance over Ottawa, and went on to a 7–1 record, challenging the Stampeders in the North Division. Injuries to key players during a three-game, 10-day road trip resulted in a late-season swoon that the Lions could not recover from. A victory over Saskatchewan at B.C. Place in the regular-season finale solidified 3rd place in the rugged Northern Division with a 10–8 record and a trip to Edmonton for the playoffs. The Lions' 1995 season came to an end with a 26–15 loss to the Eskimos in the semi-finals. Individually, Lions' running back Cory Philpot broke the CFL record for touchdowns in a season with 22, and won the Eddie James Memorial Trophy for the second year in a row as the Northern Division's leading rusher. Lui Passaglia ended the season with 3,160 career points. Jamie Taras won the DeMarco-Becket Memorial Trophy as the Northern Division's Most Outstanding Offensive Lineman.

=== Staying in contention (1996–2002) ===
The 1996 CFL season brought turmoil for the Lions, both on and off the field. Former Lions' quarterback and fan favourite Joe Paopao returned to the team from the Edmonton Eskimos as the new head coach, replacing Dave Ritchie. On March 11, 1996, Lions' owner Bill Comrie announced that the club had been sold to a group of 10 local businessmen headed by Nelson Skalbania (who once owned the Montreal Alouettes) and Michael Jensen. The Lions held training camp at UBC with over a hundred players invited. Mike McCarthy arrived in Vancouver to become the Lions new VP of football operations. On the field, the Lions started the season with 18 new faces in the line-up, including heralded Heisman Trophy winner Andre Ware at quarterback. The Lions started the season at 0–4, and quarterback Damon Allen was signed to replace Ware. As the team stumbled on the field, attendance plummeted. Stability in the front office proved short-lived, as Skalbania and his ownership group lost control of the team, and the Lions (again) went into receivership, with the CFL taking over the team once more, just as they had in 1992. The bright spot of the season was an exciting and improbable, 35–11 victory over Doug Flutie and the Toronto Argonauts, in September, 1996. On October 31, 1996, Hamilton businessman David Braley announced his intention to buy the team. November 2, 1996 marked the end of the season as the Lions defeated Ottawa 35–24 in what was the Rough Riders' final game in club history.

David Braley's ownership and a coaching change brought the Lions much-needed stability as they entered the 1997 CFL season, and some of that stability seemed to have translated to success on the field. Joe Paopao resigned prior to the season's start, and was replaced as head coach by Adam Rita. The Lions made the playoffs for the 20th time in their 43-year club history, despite an 8–10, fourth place divisional finish. The Leos' 1997 playoff appearance marked the first time in CFL history that a West Division team participated in an East Division semi-final, under a newly established "cross-over rule" (where the fourth-place team from one division qualified for the playoffs, as long as the team earned more points than the 3rd place team from the opposing division. Once so qualified, the fourth-place team would then "cross-over" to the other division to play the second-place team in the opposing division). The Lions thus faced the Montreal Alouettes in the Eastern semi-finals, eventually losing to the Alouettes, 45–35, in a spirited contest. Fullback Sean Millington was awarded the CFL's Outstanding Canadian Award at season's end, while linebacker B.J. Gallis won the Jackie Parker Trophy as the West Division's top rookie.

The Lions started the 1998 CFL season off on the wrong foot, losing their first three games, before finally beating Saskatchewan in week four. The defence held their own, but the offence struggled. The low point of the year occurred on August 9, 1998, when the eventual Grey Cup champion Calgary Stampeders came into B.C. Place and beat the hometown Leos 55–9. With a record of 3–6–0, head coach Adam Rita resigned, and was replaced by Greg Mohns. The no-nonsense approach of Mohns seemed to spark the team, as the Lions embarked on a memorable, six-game winning streak (which the team had not done since 1986) heading into the playoffs. The Lions, who finished 9–9 on the year, lost in the semi-finals to Edmonton in heartbreaking fashion, but showed promise for the upcoming season. Kicker Lui Passaglia won the Dave Dryburgh Memorial Trophy as the top scorer in the West Division.

Expectations for the Lions were high as the 1999 CFL season began, following the team's promising finish a year earlier, and with the announcement that the Grey Cup game would be played in Vancouver. Quality free agents such as slotback Don Blair and cornerback Eric Carter were brought in to add depth to an already impressive lineup, and with the likes of Robert Drummond and Jimmy "The Jet" Cunningham back in form following injury-plagued 1998 season, the Lions were primed for a successful season. The Lions started fast out of the gate, winning their first three games to set a new club record with nine straight regular-season wins. The Lions either held sole possession of first place or were tied with Calgary throughout the season. The Lions ended the regular season with two straight wins, finishing first in the division with a 13–5 record, the Lions' best record since 1985, and the first divisional championship since 1987. the Lions' dream season came to a premature and heartbreaking end, as the Stamps beat the Lions 26–24 in the Lions' first home playoff game in 12 years. The Lions appeared to be driving toward a chance to kick a game-winning field goal in the last minute before Damon Allen fumbled the ball at mid-field, allowing the Stamps to kill off the remaining time. The Lions fielded three CFL All-Stars in 1999: slotback Jimmy Cunningham, centre Jamie Taras, and defensive tackle Johnny Scott. Linebacker Paul Lacoste was voted the CFL's top rookie, and was also awarded the Jackie Parker Trophy. Defensive end Daved Benefield was named the Western Division's top defensive player, while Jamie Taras won the DeMarco-Becket Memorial Trophy as the West's most outstanding offensive lineman, as well as the CFL Player's Association Outstanding Community Service Award.

==== 2000 Grey Cup champions ====
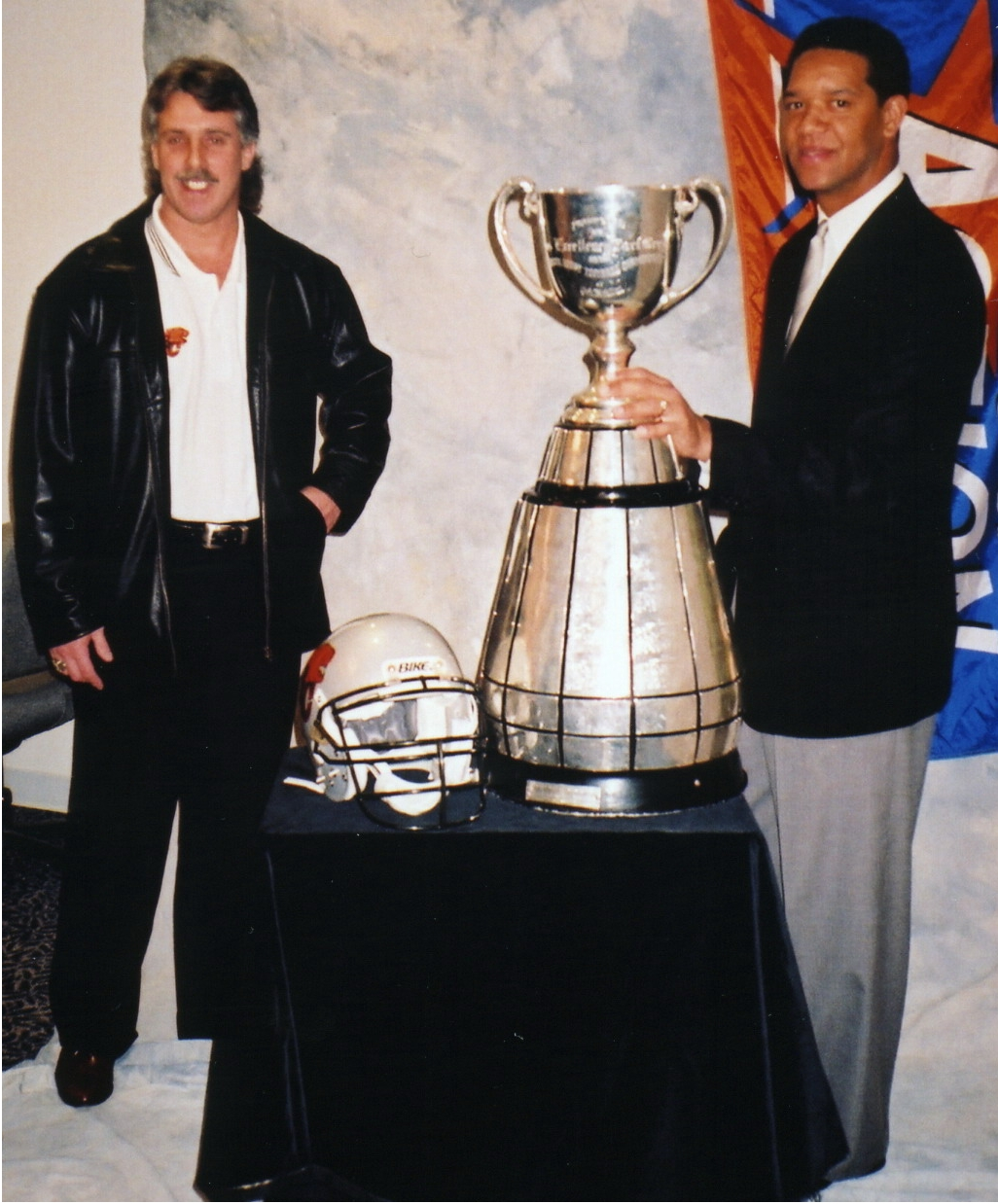
Lui Passaglia and Damon Allen with the Grey Cup in January 2001

The Lions began the 2000 campaign with only one goal in mind: win the Grey Cup. Six months later, the Lions fulfilled that destiny, but the path to the 88th Grey Cup was one of the most adventurous, unpredictable, and memorable ever in CFL history. The year started well enough, with victories over the Hamilton Tiger-Cats and Saskatchewan Roughriders, but a 35–2 loss to the Calgary Stampeders began a four-game losing streak and a lot of finger-pointing. A win over the Toronto Argonauts halted the slide, but following the game, head coach Greg Mohns resigned to join the upstart XFL. Long-time CFL coach Steve Buratto, who joined the club only two weeks earlier as a receivers coach, was promoted to the top job, and got instant results with a huge 51–4 win over the Argonauts in the second of back-to-back games. Despite a promising start, the Lions only won one of their next five games to sit at 5–9 on Thanksgiving. Nevertheless, the Lions came together when it counted the most, winning three of their last four heading into the playoffs, and the offence gelling to become the best in the CFL that season. Quarterback Damon Allen broke Ron Lancaster's CFL record for career passing yardage. Lui Passaglia played in a memorable, "Luv Ya Lui" night at his final game at B.C. Place, and also set a CFL record for single-season field goal percentage. The Lions finished the year 8–10 and in third place in the Western Division, but were the team other teams did not want to face in the playoffs. A snarly defence started to show its grit, and the Lions roared confidently into Edmonton and emerged with a 34–32 Western semi-final victory, thanks to a Passaglia field goal on the final play. The Lions next faced Calgary in the Western finals, and the Lions steamrolled to a decisive 37–23 win. The Leos' Cinderella season came to a close on November 26, 2000, in the Grey Cup at McMahon Stadium in Calgary, as the Lions won their fourth championship in team history with a nail-biting 28–26 victory over the Montreal Alouettes. Running back Robert Drummond won the Grey Cup's Most Valuable Player award, while backfield teammate Sean Millington took home the Grey Cup's Most Valuable Canadian trophy. The Lions' triumph marked the first time a team with a sub-.500 regular season record won the Grey Cup, and it signalled a marvellous end to Lui Passaglia's outstanding, 25-year CFL career. The 2000 Grey Cup championship team was inducted onto the BC Lions Wall of Fame on Sept 13, 2024.

Expectations were high for the CFL champion Lions in 2001, but the team ultimately never seemed to jell. Quarterback Damon Allen struggled, and the team hovered around the 0.500 mark all season. Finishing at 8–10, the Lions did make the playoffs, but were immediately bounced by Calgary in the Western Division semi-finals, 28–19. Matt Kellett became only the second full-time field goal kicker in 26 years, as he replaced the legendary Lui Passaglia. Rookie middle linebacker Barrin Simpson led the team in tackles and was named a first-team CFL All-Star, as well as the CFL's Rookie of the Year and Jackie Parker Trophy winner. Cornerback Eric Carter was also named to the CFL's 2001 All-Star team.

Bob Ackles returned to the Lions as president and CEO before the 2002 season, which saw the Lions finish at 10–8 for a third-place finish in the Western Division, and the return of Adam Rita as head coach. The Lions faced the Winnipeg Blue Bombers in the Western semi-finals, falling 30–3 to the Bombers. Individually, Eric Carter and Barrin Simpson repeated as CFL All-Stars, while slotback Jason Clermont won CFL's most outstanding rookie award, as well as the Western Division's Jackie Parker Trophy. Fullback Sean Millington won the Dr. Beattie Martin Trophy as the outstanding Canadian Western Division player, for the 3rd time. This was the last season that Damon Allen played for the Lions, as he finished as the franchise's all-time leader in passing yards, pass completions and passing touchdowns.

=== Buono era (2003–2011) ===
The 2003 CFL season marked the beginning of a new era, as Wally Buono replaced Adam Rita as head coach and GM. The Lions also acquired former Stampeders and NFL QB Dave Dickenson through free agency, which prompted Lions QB Damon Allen to leave for the Toronto Argonauts. The Lions finished in a three-way, second place tie at 11–7 with Western Division foes, the Winnipeg Blue Bombers and Saskatchewan Roughriders, and faced the Eastern Division's Toronto Argonauts by way of the CFL's "cross-over rule." The Lions closed out the season with a 28–7 loss to the Argonauts in the Eastern Division semi-finals. Barrin Simpson appeared as a CFL All-Star for the 3rd year in a row, joined by newcomers Ray Jacobs on defence, and electrifying slotback Geroy Simon on offence. Wide receiver Frank Cutolo won the CFL and Western Division rookie of the year awards. Offensive tackle Steve Hardin won the CFL Player's Association Outstanding Community Service Award.

The 2004 CFL season marked one of the Lions' best regular-season records in club history. Going 13–5 and finishing 1st in the division, the Lions set a team record of 8 consecutive wins in a single season. In addition to club records, the season brought an array of individual performances to the forefront. Quarterback Casey Printers set a CFL record for highest single-game completion average of 90.9% (completing 20 of 22 passing attempts) during an August, 2004 game against the Hamilton Tiger-Cats. Outstanding slot back Geroy Simon tied three team records by catching four touchdown passes in the same game. After the conclusion of the regular season, Printers was named the CFL's Most Outstanding Player, while Jason Clermont won the Most Outstanding Canadian award. Printers and Simon joined 4-time All-Star linebacker Barrin Simpson as 2004 CFL All-Stars. The Lions, receiving a bye in the first round of the playoffs by virtue of their first-place divisional finish, faced one of their biggest rivals, the Saskatchewan. In a closefinish, the Lions defeated the Roughriders 27–25, in overtime. The Lions were then pitted against the Argonauts in the 92nd Grey Cup Championship, a rematch of the 2003 semi-finals. The Lions did not exact their revenge, losing 27–19. Jason Clermont won the Grey Cup Most Valuable Canadian award in the effort. The game was marked with controversy for the Lions, as Dave Dickenson got the start over Casey Printers, who had led the team through most of the season as Dickenson was injured.

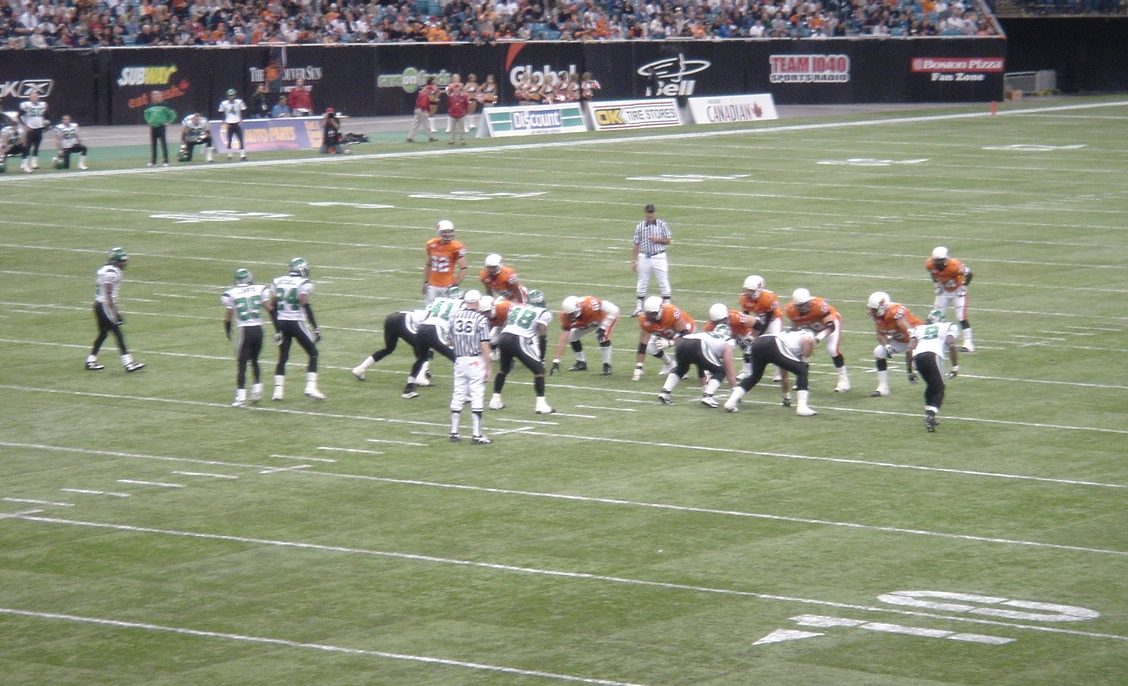
Dave Dickenson calls out a play at the line of scrimmage in a game against the Saskatchewan Roughriders at BC Place in 2005

Before and during the 2005 CFL season there was controversy as to which quarterback should be the starter, Casey Printers or Dave Dickenson. Printers was the CFL's 2004 season Most Outstanding Player, but Dickenson was a veteran star destined for the Canadian Football Hall of Fame. The team ultimately chose to go with Dickenson, despite his having been somewhat injury-prone. The Lions came out of the gate roaring. Led by Dickenson and an outstanding receiving corps, the team strung together 11 consecutive wins. The final game of the win streak came on September 17, 2005, when the Leos squeaked past the Montreal Alouettes by a score of 27–26 when Don Matthews elected to go for a two-point conversion rather than tie the game. The Lions bid for an undefeated season came to a halt the very next week on September 24, 2005, when the Edmonton Eskimos defeated the Lions 37–20 at Commonwealth Stadium. Dickenson sustained a season-ending concussion and Printers took over as starting QB. The Lions won only one of their remaining seven games of the regular season. On November 20, 2005, the Lions lost in the Western Finals to the eventual Grey Cup champion Eskimos at B.C. Place. The game ended with a controversial "non-call" on the last play of the game; as what would have been Printers' game-winning pass to slotback Geroy Simon appeared to have been interfered with by a defending Edmonton player, and was ruled incomplete. Defensive end Brent Johnson was named a 2005 CFL All-Star, and won the Outstanding Canadian Award.

==== 2006 Grey Cup champions ====
The 2006 season saw Casey Printers go off to the NFL's Kansas City Chiefs; however, a new quarterback controversy of sorts threatened to develop. During the off-season 2005s third-stringer, Buck Pierce won the back-up role and early season injuries to Dave Dickenson forced him into action. Pierce's best game as the starter was on October 6 against the Calgary Stampeders, where he threw 25 for 31 for 297 yards, 1 touchdown, and 1 interception. He began the game with one incomplete pass, and then hit his next 14.

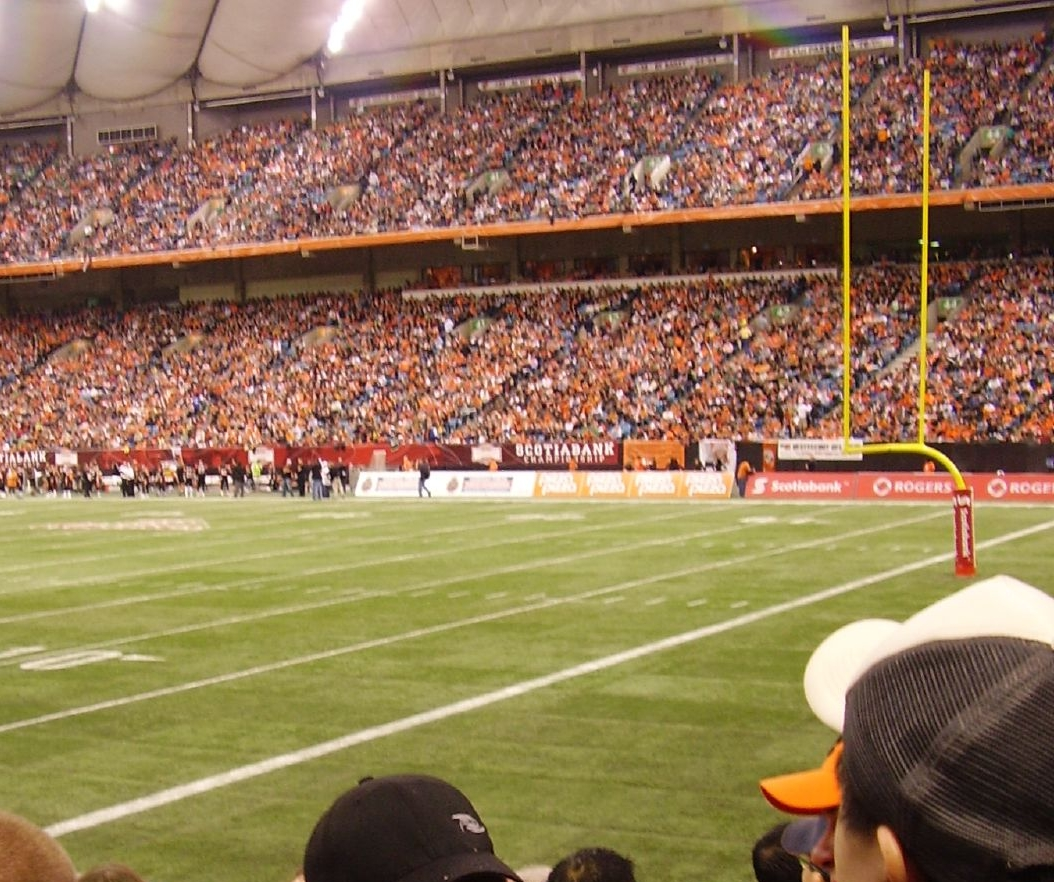
The 2006 West Division final at BC Place

The Lions in the off-season also acquired former Roughrider Paul McCallum to stabilize the kicking game which had not recovered from Lui Passaglia's retirement in 2000. After a sluggish 2–3 start in 2006, coach Buono signalled that no starting job was safe by releasing runningback Antonio Warren and defensive back Sam Young. The team responded by winning the next six games. New running back Joe Smith ran for over 100 yards in his first game. Brent Johnson, Barron Miles, and Mark Washington led a dominant defence; 10 different defenders scored touchdowns on turnovers. They also held opposing offences to 17 points or less on 6 occasions. Receiver Geroy Simon dominated opposing defensive backs in a manner not seen since Mervyn Fernandez in the 1980s, and broke the club record for single-season receiving yardage for the second straight year. The Lions clinched first place on October 6, earning a third straight bye into the Western Final at home, and tied a team record with a 13–5 mark for the season. 50,084 (league-best for 2006) saw BC crush the Roughriders 45–18 in the West final. Looking fully recovered from earlier concussions, Dickenson went 27 for 37 with three touchdowns and no interceptions. Paris Jackson made two circus catches for TDs, Jason Clermont bulled his way to 98 yards on 6 catches, Joe Smith scored twice and ran for 116 yards, McCallum was 5 for 5 in field goals, and the BC defence dominated Saskatchewan all afternoon.

On November 19, the BC Lions captured their first Grey Cup Championship since 2000 by defeating the Montreal Alouettes 25–14 at Canad Inns Stadium in Winnipeg. Dave Dickenson was named the Most Valuable Player of the game, while Paul McCallum was named the Most Valuable Canadian. In the post-game exuberance, the team snapped the Grey Cup off the lower base with the engraved names, but it was repaired the following Monday. The game is also noted for kicker Paul McCallum going 6 for 6 in field goals, making him a perfect 11 for 11 in the postseason. Coach Buono also used all three quarterbacks in the game: Dickenson, Pierce and third-string Jarious Jackson all took snaps.

The record-setting season was capped off with Buono's third CFL Coach of the Year Award. The Lions nearly swept the annual player awards, with Brent Johnson, Geroy Simon, Rob Murphy, Mark Washington, and Aaron Hunt (BC's sixth Outstanding Rookie in nine years) all taking home hardware.

In 2007 offensive coordinator Jacques Chapdelaine left for the Edmonton Eskimos in the off-season, becoming their offensive coordinator and assistant head coach. The Lions' play-calling duties for the 2007 season were handled by quarterbacks coach Steff Kruck, with play design by offensive line coach Dan Dorazio. Veteran linebacker Carl Kidd announced his retirement at the Grey Cup ring ceremony held just prior to training camp, while Bobby Singh was cut and soon picked up by the Calgary Stampeders. John Hufnagel guest-coached at training camp, having previously worked under Buono as offensive coordinator in Calgary in the 1990s.

The 2007 CFL season proved to be one of the best for the Lions, having set a new franchise record for the most regular-season wins in club history. The season started off on a five-game winning streak, including dominating wins over Edmonton (29–9) and the Saskatchewan Roughriders (42–12). However, the streak came to a halt on August 3, 2007, when the Leos suffered a 21–9 loss to the Roughriders. The Lions had a little trouble getting back on track, as they suffered a loss to the Winnipeg Blue Bombers and a tie with Calgary. A 40–7 win over the Toronto Argonauts moved the Lions back into 1st place in the West Division, due to a Saskatchewan loss to Calgary. On September 22, 2007, the Lions battled their biggest foe, the Saskatchewan Roughriders, for the 1st place spot in the West Division. The Saskatchewan lead increased and decreased several times throughout the game. However, with Saskatchewan leading by 4, the Lions never gave up in the dying minutes of the game, and QB Jarious Jackson was able to find Geroy Simon in the endzone and pass the ball for a game-winning 33 yard touchdown. The final result was an unexpected come-from-behind 37–34 victory for the Lions. The Lions went on to win all the rest of their games of the regular season and captured 1st place in the West Division for a fourth consecutive year. The Lions also finished with a regular-season record of 14–3–1, The best in club history. The Lions felt confident heading into the Western Final, but their dreams of second consecutive Grey Cup title came to an end in a heartbreaking 26–17 loss to the eventual Grey Cup champions, the Saskatchewan Roughriders.

Just before the 2008 season, the Lions' Josh Boden was cut due to being arrested. Also, Mark Washington became the secondary coach due to salary cap issues. Quarterback star Dave Dickenson was released in the final year of his contract of $400k/yr and was picked up by the Calgary Stampeders. Jacques Chapdelaine came back from the Edmonton Eskimos after being fired as offensive coordinator and assistant head coach in his one year with the club. Defensive coordinator Dave Ritchie retired after the 2007 season and Mike Benevides was promoted to his position. As well, director of player personnel Bob O'Billovich left to become general manager of the Hamilton Tiger-Cats and former Saskatchewan Roughriders general manager Roy Shivers filled his position.

The season started off on low notes, both on and off the field. After losing their first two games to Calgary and Saskatchewan, the BC Lions and the entire CFL community was shocked to hear that Lions president and CEO Bobby Ackles had suffered a heart attack and died on July 6, 2008. The Lions held a memorial ceremony at the next home game against the Winnipeg Blue Bombers and wore an orange paw on their helmets with "Bob" on the inside to commemorate Ackles.

In their first game of the season, against Calgary, starter Buck Pierce left the game with injury, meaning Jarious Jackson took over as starter. After losing their next game to the Roughriders, the Lions won three straight, synonymous with Stefan Logan's debut with the Lions and Joe Smith sitting these games out. On July 25, Geroy Simon surpassed Jim "Dirty 30" Young as the Lions' all-time receiving yards leader, in a game against the Montreal Alouettes. After electing not to attend Bob Ackles' memorial, Joe Smith began to estrange himself from the organization and only played in four of the first nine games of the season. While also posting unimpressive numbers, the Lions saw fit to trade their former star running back to the Winnipeg Blue Bombers for their former star running back, Charles Roberts on Sept 1, 2009. Shortly after, Roberts reached the 10,000 rushing yard mark for his career on Sept 13, 2009, against the Saskatchewan Roughriders in his first game as a Lion.

After a Labour Day loss to the Montreal Alouettes, the Lions won five straight under a healthy Buck Pierce. Since Buono had become head coach in 2003, the Lions had won at least four in a row each year, a streak that ended in 2009. The Lions finished the regular season with an 11–7 record, including a loss at Calgary in the last regular season game. After going 3–0–1 against Calgary in the previous season, the Lions were swept by Calgary for the first time since the 2000 season. After amassing 23 sacks, Cameron Wake won the Most Outstanding Defensive Player Award for the second consecutive year. In the playoffs, the Lions defeated the Saskatchewan Roughriders at Mosaic Stadium at Taylor Field 33–12, but lost, yet again, to the Calgary Stampeders, this time in the Western final.

The 2009 season saw a team that was decidedly different from the previous seasons' roster. While the coaching staff remained completely intact, the playing roster saw a number of notable players released or traded and some leaving for the NFL. Outstanding Defensive Player Cameron Wake signed with the Miami Dolphins, Team Rookie of the Year, Stefan Logan, signed with the Pittsburgh Steelers, Rob Murphy signed with the Toronto Argonauts and Jason Clermont and Charles Roberts were released. Otis Floyd and Tyrone Williams were later released and Jason Pottinger was traded to the Argonauts. They signed all-star linebacker Anton McKenzie, while trying to fill holes in their roster with their depth players from last year and new recruits from the US.

The season was notable for the team's use of five different quarterbacks – Buck Pierce started the year but gave way after injury to Jarious Jackson. When Jackson was injured, 3rd string QB Travis Lulay was pressed into action. Former Lion and league MVP Casey Printers then signed to the practice roster on October 8, and suited up as the third-string QB on October 9 in a game versus the Edmonton Eskimos. He then became the starting quarterback on October 24, in a 33–30 overtime loss to the Saskatchewan Roughriders. In the season finale on November 6 against Edmonton, Printers was knocked out of the game with a broken thumb. In the last regular-season game 5th string quarterback Zac Champion played more than two quarters when Buck Pierce also went down.

Losing to each of the other 3 Western teams in successive games meant BC finished fourth and last. However, Hamilton defeated Winnipeg in their last game of the season, enabling the Lions to cross over to the Eastern Division's play-off format (ahead of both Winnipeg and Toronto). The Lions faced the Tiger-Cats in the Eastern semi-final in Hamilton on November 15 and won in overtime. The Lions then advanced the Eastern final against the Montreal Alouettes, but lost 56–18.

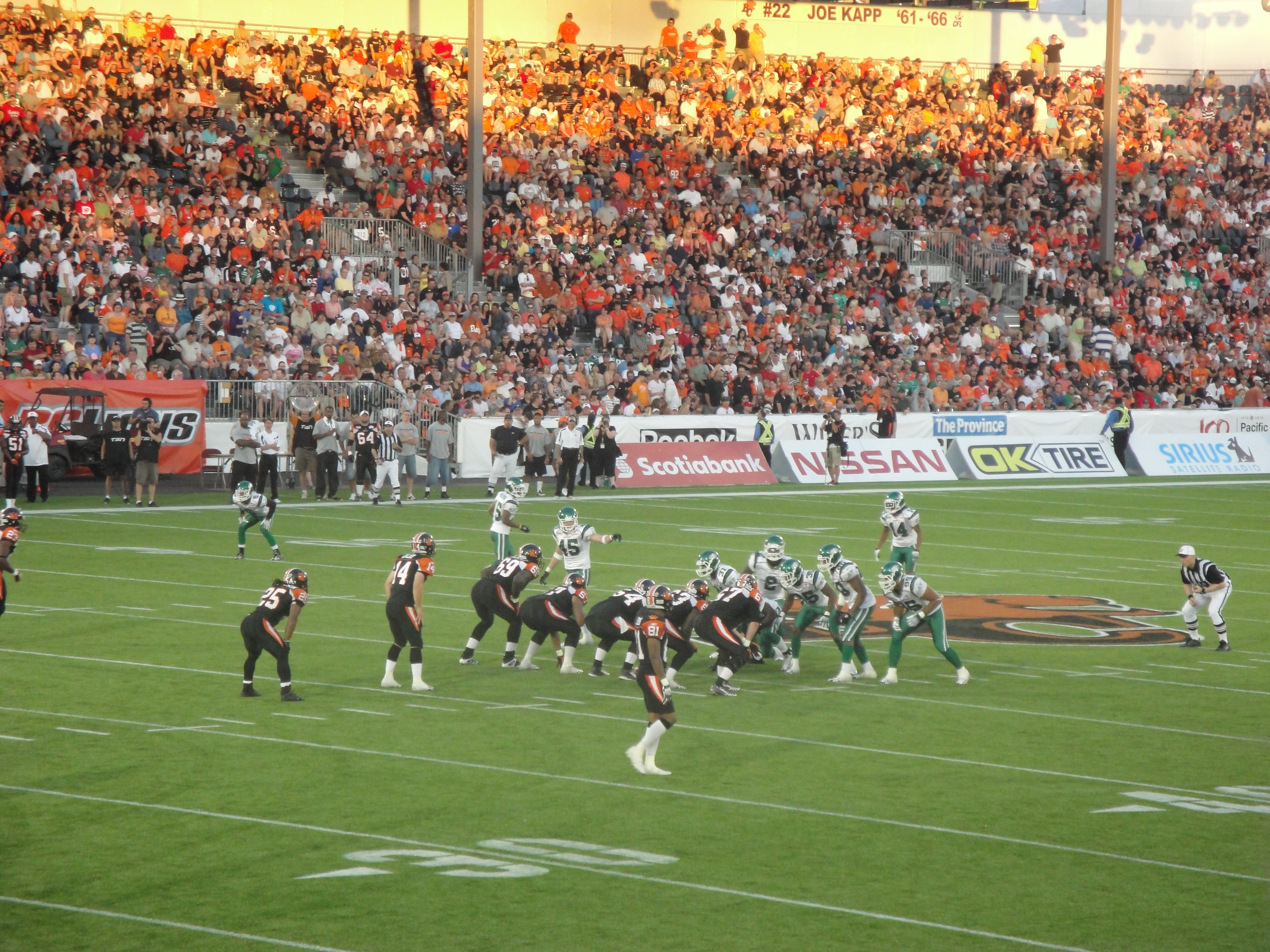
The Lions played their 2010 home games at Empire Field, here against the Roughriders

The 2009–10 offseason saw the club lose even more veterans, many who were cut by Buono, and others who left for the NFL. Quarterback Buck Pierce was released on March 9, 2010 after the return of Casey Printers meant that the injury-prone Pierce was expendable. The Lions also released former Special Teams Player of the Year Ian Smart, linebacker Javier Glatt and defensive back Lavar Glover, each of whom played a major role in the Lions' 2006 Grey Cup win. The team also lost Rolly Lumbala and Ryan Grice-Mullen to the NFL's Miami Dolphins, while rookie phenom Martell Mallett signed with the Philadelphia Eagles. Despite this, the club signed a number of proven CFL players, including Davis Sanchez and Keron Williams from the Montreal Alouettes, Jamal Robertson from the Toronto Argonauts and exiled former Bomber Derick Armstrong.

The 2010 BC Lions played all of their home games at their former site at the Pacific National Exhibition grounds at Empire Field while BC Place Stadium had a retractable roof installed. The Lions also staged their training camp in Kamloops, BC – the first of three over the next three years – as a part of the club's desire to represent the entire province.

The season started out well for the Lions, with a win against Edmonton, but that success was short lived as the Lions lost their next seven consecutive games. Quarterback Casey Printers suffered a knee injury in game 3 against the Montreal Alouettes, which forced backup quarterback Travis Lulay to start the next three games. After losing to Toronto and the previously winless Eskimos, Lulay was replaced by Jarious Jackson in the fourth quarter in the August 7, 2010, contest against Calgary after demonstrating poor play and inexperience.

After the bye week, Printers returned and won three out of the five games he started, but due to his turnover-filled back-to-back performances, he was replaced with Lulay as the starter in game 13 against Winnipeg, which the Lions won. After Lulay had a minor injury in the following game, again against Winnipeg, Printers came into the game to protect a 21-point lead. The Blue Bombers stormed back to tie the game and force overtime, which was decided by Printers' game-clinching interception. It was Casey's last game with the Lions as Buono released him soon after the game. Consequently, Lulay became the starting quarterback, finishing the season 4–5 as a starter. The Lions won their last three games to qualify for the playoffs after Edmonton lost their final game of the season, but lost in double overtime to the Saskatchewan Roughriders in the West semi-final game.

==== 2011 Grey Cup champions ====
The 2011 BC Lions season was perhaps one of the greatest season turnarounds in CFL history. The Lions entered the 2011 campaign with a lot of question marks. The team had almost exactly the same coaching staff as they had the year before, which had been criticized by many fans the past season. The team also lost a few key players, most notably Emmanuel Arceneaux, to the NFL. As well, the team opted to go with inexperienced third-year QB Travis Lulay at quarterback.

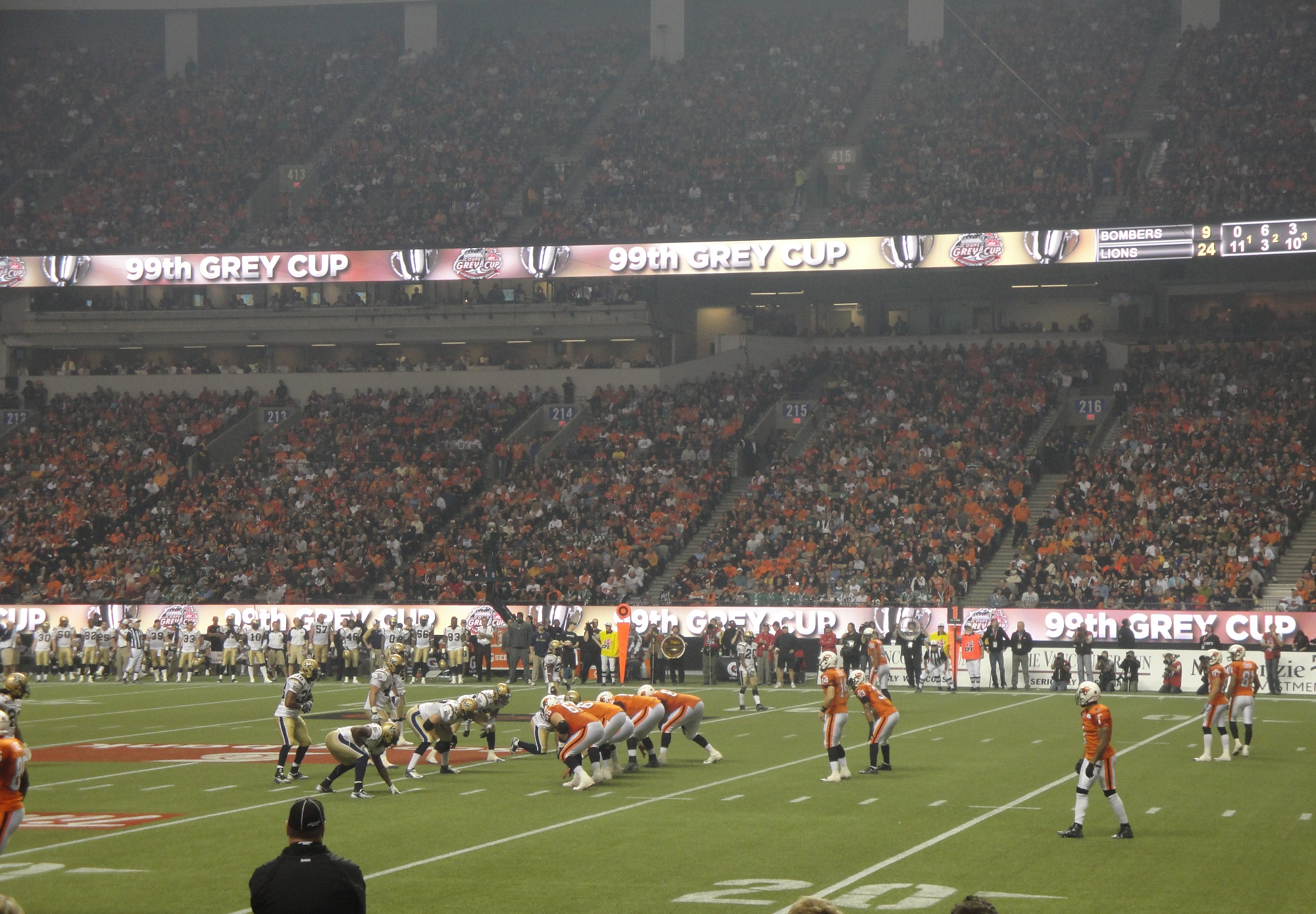
The Lions on offence at the 99th Grey Cup against the Winnipeg Blue Bombers.

Despite a questionable lineup, the Lions, as well as many fans and critics alike, believed that the team was good enough to win the Grey Cup, especially since the game was scheduled to be played in Vancouver at the newly renovated BC Place Stadium. However, the season started out with five straight losses which forced changes to be made. The Lions signed two notable CFL players: defensive back Tad Kornegay, who had just been released by the Saskatchewan Roughriders, and wide receiver Arland Bruce, who was acquired in a trade with the Hamilton Tiger-Cats. The Lions got their first win of the season when they beat the Saskatchewan Roughriders 24–11 in week 6, but the following week, the Lions were swept by the Winnipeg Blue Bombers for the first time in ten years. Now sitting at 1–6, many fans and critics started to doubt the Lions playoff hopes, but after a convincing 36–1 win over the Edmonton Eskimos, the Lions went on a remarkable 8-game winning streak, skyrocketing the Leos all the way to the top of a very competitive West Division. The Lions winning streak ended after a 42–10 loss to Hamilton in week 17, but after that, the Lions won their last two games of the season, which included a 43–1 clobbering of the two-time defending Grey Cup champions Montreal Alouettes in the regular-season finale. After starting the season 0–5, the Lions rebounded to win 11 of their last 13 games to clinch 1st place in the West Division with an 11–7 record, as well as a bye in the first round of the playoffs and a home playoff game.

In the West Division Final, the Lions faced the Edmonton Eskimos, the same team that beat the Lions in the 2005 West final, which denied the Lions a home game in the Grey Cup, since Vancouver hosted the Grey Cup that year. However, in 2011, a home game in the Grey Cup is what the Lions got, as the Leos dominated the Eskimos 40–23 as the Lions advanced to the big game for the first time in five years. In the Grey Cup, the Lions were up against the Winnipeg Blue Bombers for only the second time in Grey Cup history. Although Winnipeg won both regular-season meetings with BC, the Lions went on to beat the Bombers 34–23 in front of a home crowd to win their 6th Grey Cup championship in franchise history. Travis Lulay was named Grey Cup Most Valuable Player, while Winnipeg native Andrew Harris was named Most Valuable Canadian. With the Grey Cup win, the BC Lions became the first team to start a season 0–5 and win the Grey Cup.

Head coach Wally Buono announced shortly after the Grey Cup that he would step down as head coach but would remain as vice president and general manager. The BC Lions were named the Canadian Press Team of the Year for 2011 in voting by sports editors and broadcasters across Canada.

=== Missed opportunities and near-misses (2012–2019) ===
Defensive coordinator Mike Benevides was promoted and announced as the team's new head coach on December 13, 2011. Several veteran players left the team or were released prior to the start of the 2012 season. Defensive back Tad Kornegay was released by the Lions while all-star linebacker Solomon Elimimian and defensive tackle Aaron Hunt signed with the Minnesota Vikings and the Montreal Alouettes, respectively. The Lions did, however, manage to resign veteran cornerbacks Dante Marsh and Ryan Phillips during the free-agency period, as well as all-star defensive back Lin-J Shell and cornerback Byron Parker.

On December 19, 2014, Jeff Tedford was named the 25th head coach in franchise history after Mike Benevides had been let go November 20. The 2015 season saw the emergence of rookie quarterback Jonathan Jennings, who took over as the starter from Travis Lulay midway through the season. The 2015 season was the only one for Tedford, as he resigned after only one season where he led the lions to a 7–11 record, finishing third in the west and losing to Calgary in the playoffs. Upon Tedford's resignation, Wally Buono announced that he would return as head coach in 2016.

In Buono's first season back at the helm of the Lions, he guided the team to its first second-place finish in the West since 1986, with a 12–6 record, and defeated the Winnipeg Blue Bombers in the West Semi-Final, only to lose to Calgary in the West Final. The following season, the Lions missed the playoffs for the first time since 1996, finishing in 5th and last place in the West with a 7–11 record. On November 30, 2017, Buono stepped down from his position as general manager, being replaced in that stead by Ed Hervey. Buono stayed on as head coach in 2018, but he also announced it would be his last season as coach for the team. The team finished 9–9, returning to the playoffs as a crossover team, losing to the Hamilton Tiger-Cats in the East Semi-Final 48–8. On December 18, 2018, DeVone Claybrooks was named Buono's successor at head coach for the Lions. He lasted only one season, finishing in 5th and last place in the West with a 5–13 mark, with Claybrooks fired on November 5. Former Ottawa Redblacks coach Rick Campbell was named the new head coach of the Lions on December 2, 2019.

=== A new era, a new owner (2020–present) ===
In October 2020, owner David Braley died, but bequeathed funds for the BC Lions so that the team could continue to operate for several seasons. On August 18, 2021, the BC Lions were bought by Amar Doman, who runs two private companies in British Columbia, Futura Corporation and CanWel. After the cancellation of the 2020 CFL season, the Lions returned to play along with the rest of the CFL in 2021. However, the team languished in the shortened season, with a seven-game losing streak in the second half proving fatal to the team's season, and they finished 5–9, good for fourth in the West. 2022 saw the Lions return to the playoffs for the first time since 2018, guided by new quarterback Nathan Rourke, who led the team to a 12–6 and second place in the West. The Lions downed the Calgary Stampeders in the West Semi-Final, but their season ended at the hands of the two-time defending Grey Cup champion Winnipeg Blue Bombers in the West Final game. The 2023 season saw a similar finish, a 12–6 second-place finish in the West, defeating the Stampeders in the West Semi Final game, but losing again to the Winnipeg Blue Bombers in the West Final game.

2024 marked the BC Lions 70th season and saw the club host several large events, including a sellout home opener featuring a pregame performance by global rap icon 50 Cent. On August 31, the Lions played the first Touchdown Pacific, defeating the Ottawa Redblacks 38–12 at Royal Athletic Park in Victoria. Based on the CFL's Touchdown Atlantic series, Touchdown Pacific was the first regular season CFL game played on Vancouver Island. Royal Athletic Park, which is the home of the Victoria Harbourcats collegiate baseball team, increased its capacity from 3,500 to over 14,000. The BC Lions also hosted the 111th Grey Cup game at BC Place on November 17.

== Current roster ==
BC Lions roster
**Quarterbacks**: 14 Chris Oladokun; 12 Nathan Rourke; 19 Kaidon Salter; **Receivers**: 83 Stanley Berryhill III; 86 Jevon Cottoy; 4 Keon Hatcher Sr.; 84 Jermaine Jackson; 88 Hergy Mayala; 18 Justin McInnis; 82 Kieran Poissant; **Running backs**: 20 James Butler; 34 Zander Horvath; **Fullbacks**: 36 Jacob Bond; 45 Riley Pickett	**Offensive linemen**: 51 Michael Couture; 54 Andrew Peirson; 61 Anu "George" Una; 67 Tyran Walker-Hunt; 64 Kory Woodruff; 59 Brandon Yates; **Defensive linemen**: 90 Mathieu Betts; 40 Tibo Debaillie; 48 Hayden Harris; 95 Tomasi Laulile; 93 Lorenzo Mauldin IV; 49 Shaun Peterson Jr.; 2 Casey Sayles; 94 Matt Spatny; 99 Jonah Tavai	**Linebackers**: 35 Woodly Appolon; 46 Ben Hladik; 31 Adam Konar; 32 Maxime Rouyer; 53 Darnell Sankey; 50 Wesley Steiner; **Defensive backs**: 29 Cristophe Beaulieu; 0 Robert Carter Jr.; 33 Jackson Findlay; 13 Pierre Kemeni; 21 Ronald Kent Jr.; 6 T. J. Lee III; 23 Stantley Thomas-Oliver III; 9 Deontai Williams Sr.; **Special teams**: 41 Cam Foran LS; 17 Carl Meyer P; 10 Sean Whyte K	**Reserve roster**: 25 Emani Bailey RB; 3 C. J. Coldon Jr. DB; 66 Lorenzo Thompson OL; **1-game injured**: 98 Levi Bell DL; 77 T. J. Burke DL; 91 Nathan Cherry DL; 16 Nate DeMontagnac WR; 96 David Gusta DL; 8 Seven McGee WR; 42 Parker McKenna DB; 1 Garry Peters DB; 24 Patrice Rene DB; **6-game injured**: 55 Isiah Cage OL; 85 Nick Cenacle WR; 58 Joshua Coker OL; 65 Joshua Donovan OL; 39 Jett Elad DB; 70 Mark McNamee K; 28 Dawson Pierre LB; 26 Tyson Russell DB; 57 Chris Schleuger OL	**Practice roster**: 68 Alex Berwick OL; 89 Michael Fitzgerald II WR; 44 Thomas Graham Jr. DB; 47 Chase Henning LB; 37 Mac McCain III DB; 43 Jordan Oladokun DB; 87 Ben Patterson WR; 69 Ivory Scott Jr. OL; 80 Jaden Williams WR; **Suspended list**: 96 Bradlee Anae DL; -- Derwin Gray OL; 73 Demetrius Taylor DL
Italics indicate American player • **Bold** indicates Global player • 46 Roster, 3 Reserve, 18 Injured, 9 Practice, 3 Suspended; Roster updated 2026-11-06 • Depth chart • Transactions • More CFL rosters

== Current coaching staff ==
BC Lions staff
Front office and support staff: Owner – Amar Doman; President and CEO – Duane Vienneau; Senior Vice President, Business – George Chayka; Vice President, Business Operations & Marketing - Carolyn Cody; Vice President, Sales & Service - Colby Fackler; Vice President, Football Operations – Neil McEvoy; General manager – Ryan Rigmaiden; Assistant General Manager – Rob Ralph; Director of US Scouting – Jim Jauch; Manager, Football Operations – Tyler Gammon; U. S. Scout – Will Ark; Video Coordinator – Derek Oswalt; Head Athletic Therapist – Aaron Balson; Equipment Manager – Aaron Yeung	Head coach: Head coach/Offensive coordinator – Buck Pierce; Offensive coaches: Receivers and Pass Game Coordinator – Kevin Bourgoin; Offensive Line – Paul Charbonneau; Running Backs – Kristian Matte; Defensive coaches: Defensive Coordinator – Mike Benevides; Defensive Line – Randy Melvin; Linebackers – Glen Young; Secondary and Pass Game Coordinator – Ryan Phillips; Special teams coaches: Special Teams Coordinator – Dennis McKnight; Special Teams Assistant – Derek Oswalt; → Coaching Staff → More CFL staffs

== Ownership ==
The BC Lions Football Club is owned by businessman Amar Doman, who was introduced as the club's owner on August 18, 2021. As of 2026, the BC Lions Football Club executive committee consisted of four people:

- Duane Vienneau, President
- George Chayka, Senior Vice President of Business
- Carolyn Cody, Vice President of Business Operations & Marketing
- Colby Fackler, Vice President of Sales & Service
- Neil McEvoy, Vice President of Football Operations

== Players and builders of note ==
=== Retired numbers ===
The BC Lions have retired 11 jersey numbers in their history, matching the Montreal Alouettes for the most jersey numbers retired by one team in the Canadian Football League. The Lions retired number 56 in honour of linebacker Solomon Elimimian on October 4, 2025, which was the most recent number retired by the club.

BC Lions retired numbers
No.	Player	Position	Tenure	Championships
5	Lui Passaglia	K/P	1976–2000	1985, 1994, 2000
15	Willie "The Wisp" Fleming	RB	1959–1966	1964
22	Joe Kapp	QB	1961–1966	1964
30	Jim "Dirty Thirty" Young	SB/WR	1967–1979	–
38	Byron "By" Bailey	FB/DB	1954–1964	1964
52	Al Wilson	C	1972–1986	1985
56	Solomon Elimimian	LB	2010–2018	2011
60	Jamie Taras	FB/OL	1987–2002	1994, 2000
75	Norm Fieldgate	E/LB	1954–1967	1964
81	Geroy Simon	SB/WR	2001–2012	2006, 2011
97	Brent Johnson	DE	2001–2011	2006, 2011

=== Canadian Football Hall of Fame ===
BC Lions Canadian Football Hall of Famers
No.	Name	Position	Tenure	Inducted	No.	Name	Position	Tenure	Inducted
11	Jackie Parker	QB	1968	1971	5	Lui Passaglia	K/P	1976–2000	2004
–	Annis Stukus	Head coach/General manager	1953–1955	1974	51	Ray Nettles	LB	1972–1976	2005
38	Byron Bailey	FB/DB	1976–1988	1975	–	Victor Spencer	Builder	NA	2006
75	Norm Fieldgate	LB	1976–1978	1975	44	Alondra Johnson	LB	1989–1990	2009
–	Harry C. F. Spring	Builder	1953–1959	1976	66	Jim Mills	OT	1986–1993, 1995	2009
15	Willie Fleming	RB	1959–1966	1982	–	Don Matthews	Head coach	1983–1987	2011
69	Tom Brown	HB	1961–1967	1984	14	Danny McManus	QB	1993–1995	2011
22	Joe Kapp	QB	1961–1966	1984	9	Damon Allen	QB	1996–2002	2011
–	Eagle Keys	Head coach	1971–1975	1990	–	David Braley	Owner	1997–2020	2012
54	Tom Hinton	G/T	1958–1966	1991	99	Tyrone Jones	LB	1993	2012
30	Jim Young	SB	1967–1979	1991	–	Wally Buono	Head coach/General manager	1956–1964	2014
76	Bill Baker	DE	1974–1976	1994	1	Charles Roberts	RB	2008	2014
18	Bill Symons	HB	1966	1997	12	Dave Dickenson	QB	2003–2007	2015
52	Al Wilson	C	1972–1986	1998	–	Bob O'Billovich	Head coach/General manager Administrator	1990–1992; 2003–2007	2015
11	Condredge Holloway	QB	1987	1998	32	Kelvin Anderson	RB	2003	2017
68	Bill Frank	OT	1962–1964	2001	81	Geroy Simon	SB	2001–2012	2017
40	James "Quick" Parker	DE	1984–1989	2001	97	Brent Johnson	DE	2001–2011	2018
–	Bob Ackles	Administrator	1953–1986; 2002–2008	2002	9	Barron Miles	DB	2005–2009	2018
00	Less Browne	DB	1993–1994	2002	24	Mervyn Fernandez	WR	1982–1986, 1994	2019
–	Cal Murphy	Coach	1974–1976	2004	2	David Williams	WR	1988–1989	2019
10	Bernie Faloney	Quarterback	1967	2004					

=== BC Sports Hall of Fame ===
BC Lions in the BC Sports Hall of Fame
No.	Name	Position	Tenure	Inducted	No.	Name	Position	Tenure	Inducted
75	Norm Fieldgate	LB	1976–1978	1970	15	Willie Fleming	RB	1959–1966	1998
38	Byron Bailey	FB/DB	1976–1988	1975	22	Joe Kapp	QB	1961–1966	1999
–	1964 BC Lions			1986	–	1985 BC Lions			2000
54	Tom Hinton	G/T	1958–1966	1992	5	Lui Passaglia	K/P	1976–2000	2001
30	Jim Young	SB	1967–1979	1994	–	Bob Ackles	Administrator	1953–1986; 2002–2008	2004
–	Jack Farley	Administrator	1974–1983	1996	–	Herb Capozzi	General manager	1957–1966	2007
52	Al Wilson	C	1972–1986	1997	–	1994 BC Lions			2010
–	Annis Stukus	Head coach/General manager	1953–1955	1998	25	Sean Millington	RB	1991–1997; 2000–2002	2010

=== BC Lions Wall of Fame ===
Located at Level 2 Inner Concourse between Sections 11 and 10 at BC Place Stadium.

- 1954 Team
- 1964 Team
- 1985 Team
- 1994 Team
- 2000 Team
- Bob Ackles
- Damon Allen
- Ken Appleby
- Byron (BY) Bailey
- Neal Beaumont
- John Blain
- Tom Brown
- Eric Carter
- Mike Cacic
- Herb Capozzi
- Jim Carphin
- Roy Cavallin
- Bill Clancey
- Pat Claridge
- Jason Clermont
- Larry Crawford
- Tyrone Crews
- Lonnie Dennis
- Roy Dewalt
- Solomon Elimimian
- Jim Evenson
- Jack Farley
- Mervyn Fernandez
- Norm Fieldgate
- Willie "The Wisp" Fleming
- Darren Flutie
- Joe Fourqurean
- Dick Fouts
- Nick Hebeler
- Lynn "Lefty" Hendrickson
- Paul Higgins
- Tom Hinton
- Sonny Homer
- Glen Jackson
- Brent Johnson
- Ron Jones
- Joe Kapp
- Kato Kasuya
- Carl Kidd
- Rick Klassen
- Kevin Konar
- Travis Lulay
- Don Mackenzie
- Cory Mantyka
- Don Matthews
- Allan McEachern
- Sean Millington
- Jim Mills
- Mack Moore
- Bill Munsey
- Ray Nettles
- Creighton O'Malley
- John Pankratz
- Joe Paopao
- James "Quick" Parker
- Lui Passaglia
- Ryan Phillips
- Vic Rapp
- Bill Recheilt
- Dal Richards
- Gerald Roper
- Geroy Simon
- Ian Sinclair
- Dave Skrien
- Victor Spencer
- Harry Spring
- Annis Stukus
- Ken Sugarman
- Jamie Taras
- John Henry White
- Al Wilson
- Jim Young

== Football operations history ==
=== Head coaches ===
- Annis Stukus (1954–1955)
- Clem Crowe (1956–1958)
- Danny Edwards (1958)
- Wayne Robinson (1959–1961)
- Dave Skrien (1961–1967)
- Jim Champion (1967–1969)
- Jackie Parker (1969–1970)
- Eagle Keys (1971–1975)
- Cal Murphy (1975–1976)
- Vic Rapp (1977–1982)
- Don Matthews (1983–1987)
- Larry Donovan (1987–1989)
- Joe Galat (1989)
- Lary Kuharich (1990)
- Jim Young (1990)
- Bob O'Billovich (1990–1992)
- Dave Ritchie (1993–1995)
- Joe Paopao (1996)
- Adam Rita (1997–1998)
- Greg Mohns (1998–2000)
- Steve Buratto (2000–2002)
- Adam Rita (2002)
- Wally Buono (2003–2011, 2016–2018)
- Mike Benevides (2012–2014)
- Jeff Tedford (2015–2016)
- DeVone Claybrooks (2019)
- Rick Campbell (2020–2024)
- Buck Pierce (2025–present)

=== General managers ===
- Phil Webb (1954–1956)
- Herb Capozzi (1957–1966)
- Denny Veitch (1967–1970)
- Jackie Parker (1971–1975)
- Bob Ackles (1975–1985)
- Joe Galat (1986–1989)
- Joe Kapp (1990)
- Jim Young (1990)
- Bob O'Billovich (1990–1992)
- Eric Tillman (1993–1994)
- Dave Ritchie (1995)
- George Chayka (1996)
- Adam Rita (1997–2002)
- Wally Buono (2003–2017)
- Ed Hervey (2017–2020)
- Rick Campbell and Neil McEvoy (2021–2024)
- Ryan Rigmaiden (2025–present)

=== Owners ===
- Community Ownership (Nov. 25, 1953 – Sep. 7, 1989)
- Murray Pezim (Sep. 7, 1989 – Aug. 24, 1992)
- Canadian Football League (Aug. 24, 1992 – Sep. 23, 1992)
- Bill Comrie (Sep. 23, 1992 – Mar. 11, 1996)
- Nelson Skalbania & Mike Jensen (Mar. 11, 1996 – Aug. 30, 1996)
- Canadian Football League (Aug. 30, 1996 – Oct. 31, 1996)
- David Braley (Oct. 31, 1996 – Oct. 26, 2020)
- Estate of David Braley (Oct. 26, 2020 – Aug. 2021)
- Amar Doman (Aug. 2021 – present)

=== Team presidents ===
- Arthur E. Mercer (1953)
- Don Mackenzie (1954–1956)
- Bill McMahan (1957)
- Harry Spring (1958–1959)
- Ralph Henderson (1960–1961)
- C. B. Delbridge (1962–1964)
- Alan Eyre (1965–1966)
- Allan McEachern (1967–1969)
- Ian Barclay (1970)
- Wes Munsie (1970–1974)
- Bill McEwen (1975)
- Doug Johnston (1975–1976)
- Jack Farley (1977–1978)
- Paul Higgins (1979–1982)
- Ron Jones (1983–1985)
- Grant MacLaren (1986)
- Charles Walker (1986–1987)
- James O'Leary Hogan (1988)
- Norm Fieldgate (1989)
- Joe Kapp (1990)
- Frank Gigliotti (1991–1992)
- Bill Comrie (1993)
- Peter Classon (1994)
- Doug Bodie (1995)
- Michael P. McCarthy (1996)
- Glen Ringdal (1997–2001)
- Bob Ackles (2002–2008)
- David Braley (2009, 2017)
- Dennis Skulsky (2010–2016) (stepped down in 2016, became vice chair)
- Rick LeLacheur (2018–2022)
- Duane Vienneau (2022–present)

== 50th Anniversary Dream Team ==
Selected by fan balloting in 2003

=== Offence ===
- QB—Doug Flutie—1990–1991—34 games
- RB—Willie Fleming—1959–1966—124 games
- FB—Sean Millington—1991–1997 and 2000–2002—148 games
- SB—Darren Flutie—1991–1995—73 games
- TE—Harry Holt—1978–1982—54 games
- WR—Mervyn Fernandez—1982–1986 and 1994—83 games
- WR—Jim Young—1967–1979—197 games
- C—Al Wilson—1972–1986—233 games
- OG—Tom Hinton—1958–1966—136 games
- OG—Jamie Taras—1987–2002—265 games
- OT—John Blain—1977–1987—174 games
- OT—Jim Mills—1986–1993, 1995—129 games

=== Defence ===
- DT—Mike Cacic—1957–1958 and 1960–1967—117 games
- DT—Rick Klassen—1981–1987 and 1990—142 games
- DE—James "Quick" Parker—1984–1989—87 games
- DE—Nick Hebeler—1979–1985—86 games
- LB—Glen Jackson—1976–1987—192 games
- LB—Tom Brown—1961–1967—97 games
- LB—Norm Fieldgate—1954–1967—223 games
- CB—Joe Fourqurean—1973–1981—122 games
- CB—Eric Carter—1999–2003—86 games
- DB—Larry Crawford—1981–1989—130 games
- DB—Andre Francis—1986–1988 and 1992–1993—76 games
- S—Bill Munsey—1963–1967—76 games

=== Special teams ===
- P/K—Lui Passaglia—1976–2000—408 games
- KR—Leon Bright—1977–1980—56 games

=== Coach ===
Don Matthews—1983–1987

== Radio ==
The BC Lions radio network consists of 15 stations:

- CKGO Vancouver (Flagship Station, 730 AM)
- CFAX Victoria (1070 AM)
- CKFR Kelowna (1150 AM)
- CHNL Kamloops (610 AM)
- CJNL Merritt (1230 AM)
- CINL Ashcroft/Cache Creek (1340 AM)
- CHNL-1 Clearwater (1400 AM)
- CHNL-FM Sorrento/Shuswap (107.1 FM)
- CHNL Logan Lake (106.7 FM)
- CHNL Blue River/Valemount
- CFNR Terrace/Thornhill (92.1 FM)
- CFNR Kitimat/Nass Valley/Queen Charlotte Islands (96.1 FM)
- CFNR Prince Rupert (98.1 FM)

Notable broadcasters for the BC Lions include Canadian Football Hall of Fame inductee John Badham.

== Mascot ==
The BC Lions have two mascots: Leo (00) and Roary (01). Leo is most often found on the concourse during games, while Roary is on the field and participates with the dance team.

== See also ==
- BC Lions all-time records and statistics
- Canadian Football Hall of Fame
- Canadian football
- Comparison of Canadian and American football
- List of Canadian Football League seasons
