= Byron Bailey =

American gridiron football player (1930–1998)

No. 45, 20, 88, 38
- Positions: Halfback, Defensive back, Linebacker

Personal information
- Born: October 12, 1930; Omaha, Nebraska, U.S.
- Died: January 18, 1998 (aged 67); Winfield, British Columbia, Canada
- Listed height: 5 ft 10 in (1.78 m)
- Listed weight: 192 lb (87 kg)

Career information
- High school: West Seattle (Seattle, Washington)
- College: Washington State (1948–1951)
- NFL draft: 1952: 25th round, 298th overall pick

Career history
- Detroit Lions (1952); Green Bay Packers (1953); BC Lions (1954–1964)

Awards and highlights
- Grey Cup champion (1964); BC Lions #38 retired; Second-team All-PCC (1951)

Career NFL statistics
- Rushing yards: 103
- Rushing average: 3.2
- Receptions: 10
- Receiving yards: 147
- Total touchdowns: 2
- Stats at Pro Football Reference
- Canadian Football Hall of Fame

Byron Ledare "By" Bailey (October 12, 1930 – January 18, 1998) was an American professional football player, primarily as a fullback and defensive back for the BC Lions of the Canadian Football League (CFL). Born in Omaha, Nebraska, Bailey is a member of the Canadian Football Hall of Fame, the BC Sports Hall of Fame, the B.C. Lions Wall of Fame, and the Washington State University Athletic Hall of Fame. Bailey's #38 jersey is one of eleven numbers retired by the B.C. Lions. In 2006, Bailey was voted to the Honour Roll of the CFL's top 50 players of the league's modern era by Canadian sports network TSN.

Bailey scored the first touchdown in the history of the B.C. Lions' franchise, on August 28, 1954, against the Winnipeg Blue Bombers.

== College career ==
Bailey's family moved from Omaha, Nebraska in the early 1940s to Seattle, Washington, where Bailey played high school football at West Seattle High School. Following his high school graduation, Bailey played collegiately as a halfback at Washington State University, where he is 5th place all-time for the longest run from scrimmage, 84 yards, against UCLA in a 1949 contest. Bailey was inducted into the Washington State University Athletic Hall of Fame in 1986.

== Professional career ==
=== National Football League ===
Bailey was drafted by the Detroit Lions in the 25th round of the 1952 NFL Draft. He played sparingly, but was with the team when they won the 1952 NFL Championship game, 17–7, over the Cleveland Browns. The following year, Bailey was traded to the then last place Green Bay Packers, where he finished the 1953 season with 29 yards on 13 rushing attempts, and 8 pass receptions for 119 yards.

=== Canadian Football League ===
Unhappy with his playing time in Green Bay, Bailey, recruited by CFL legend and the first head coach of the B.C. Lions Annis Stukus, joined the Lions for their inaugural, 1954 season. Bailey scored the first touchdown in B.C. Lions' history on August 28, 1954, during an 8–6 loss to the Winnipeg Blue Bombers. Bailey also scored the first, winning touchdown in B.C. Lions' history on September 18, 1954, during a 9–4 victory over the Calgary Stampeders.

Bailey was the Lions' leading rusher and offensive captain from 1955 to 1960, and twice led the CFL Western Division in kick-off returns. In 1957, Bailey was named to the CFL Western Division All-Star Team as a running back. That same year, Bailey won the Bobby Bourne Memorial Trophy as the Lions' "Most Popular Player." Bailey was also honored with a "By Bailey Night" by the Lions during the 1960 season, the first player to receive such an honor.

Bailey began his career as a fullback in the Lions' double fullback offensive backfield. In 1962, when the Lions dropped the double fullback position, Bailey played outside linebacker and cornerback. He wore #88 as an offensive player and #38 when on defense.

Bailey retired following the B.C. Lions first Grey Cup Championship in 1964. Over his 11-year career with the Lions, which covered 158 games, Bailey rushed for 3,643 yards on 783 attempts, and caught 101 passes for 1,161 yards. He was the first B.C. Lion player inducted into the Canadian Football Hall of Fame in 1975, and was inducted into the BC Sports Hall of Fame the same year. In November, 2006, Bailey was voted to the Honour Roll of the CFL's top 50 players of the league's modern era by Canadian sports network TSN.

== Post-football life and death ==
Following his retirement from the B.C. Lions in 1964, Bailey worked as an executive with the Crown Zellerbach paper company. His wife of 36 years, Diana, died in 1986. After remarrying in 1989, Bailey moved north of Kelowna, British Columbia near where the Lions would hold their spring training camps.

Bailey died of cancer at age 67 on January 18, 1998, at his home in Winfield, British Columbia. His funeral was held in Vancouver.

== Sources ==
- Lionbackers.com profile - #38 By Bailey (Fan Site)
