= Mike McCarthy (gridiron football executive) =

American football executive (born 1953)

Michael P. McCarthy (born March 21, 1953) is a professional football executive and scout. He was born in Oneida, New York, and raised in Rome, New York. McCarthy began playing football at Rome (NY) Free Academy H.S. where he earned All-State football honours and was an all-star in lacrosse and wrestling. Currently, he is a pro football player personnel consultant.

McCarthy's career highlights include; induction into the Rome Sports Hall of Fame for lifetime achievement in sports (1992); induction into the Scouts Hall of Fame; and his 2008, induction into Southwestern College's Athletic Hall of Fame. Other highlights include being named the youngest general manager ever to win a CFL championship when the Toronto Argonauts captured the Grey Cup in 1991; pulling off one of the largest trades in the history of professional football when he orchestrated a deal with the Edmonton Eskimos, which saw 16 players switch teams.

He has given public football seminars, "Everything You Wanted To Know About Football But Were Afraid To Ask;" has been featured in various sports media, including stories by, Stephen Brunt of The Globe and Mail, a 2003 story by Perry Lefko of The Toronto Sun where Lefko wrote about McCarthy's plans to participate in the Running of the Bulls in Pamplona Spain, and Sports Illustrated's story about the Chicago Blitz's tryout with Illinois prison inmate Mike Sifford in 1982.

McCarthy is listed in the 1997 edition of Who's Who in Canada and is co-editor of Cuts and Keeps, an annual registry of rookie and first-year pro football players. Mike is an honorary director for Sports For Kids Inc in North America. Mike was appointed by the City of Hamilton, Ontario as member of the board of directors of The Canadian Football Hall of Fame and Museum in March 2011 and later named vice-chairman of the board.

== College career ==
At Southwestern College in Winfield, Kansas Mike was an all-star linebacker and led the Moundbuilders in tackles in each of his four seasons with the team. He still holds three school records for most tackles in a game (32), in a season (180)led the NAIA, and in a career (623). McCarthy was also the team's Defensive MVP and all-conference selection in both 1974 and 1975 and was a member of the track and field team where he participated in the hammer throw. He also qualified to attend the 1976 United States Olympic Trials after finishing second in the AAU Federation Wrestling Championships for the state of Kansas.

After graduating Southwestern College with a bachelor's degree in Health, Physical Education and Recreation, Mike had a free-agent tryout with the Dallas Cowboys.

In the fall of 1976 McCarthy was awarded a Graduate teaching assistantship at The University of Oklahoma in the Health, Physical Education and Recreation Department, he served as a volunteer coach at the University of Oklahoma, and was named an assistant coach and later Head Junior Varsity Coach under Barry Switzer in January 1977. During this time, the Oklahoma Sooners made trips to the Fiesta Bowl in 1976, the Orange Bowl in 1978 and 1979, and were Big Eight Champions from 1976 to 1978. In 1979, McCarthy obtained his master's degree in educational administration from the University of Oklahoma. .

== Professional career ==
=== NFL ===
McCarthy's extensive professional football career began as a college scout for the New England Patriots from 1979 to 1981. He worked for the Seattle Seahawks during the spring of 1982, and spent three seasons with the San Diego Chargers as a college and pro scout (2003 to 2005). McCarthy scouted players in all professional football leagues and college players across the United States and Canada. During his three seasons with the Chargers he travelled to over 150 universities, NFL, CFL and Arena games. The Chargers won the 2004 AFC Western Division championship.

=== USFL ===
After coaching at Brown University (Ivy League) in 1981 and working for the Seahawks, McCarthy moved on to be the director of player personnel for the Chicago Blitz (1982–83), the Arizona Wranglers (1983–84) and the Oakland Invaders (1984–85) of the United States Football League (USFL). From 1982 to 1984, Mike served under legendary Hall of Fame head coach, the late George Allen, going to the conference championship in 1983 and the USFL Championship game in 1984.

=== CFL ===
McCarthy's CFL (Canadian Football League) career began in 1985 when he joined the Hamiton Tiger-Cats as director of Player Personnel, and later taking on the additional role of assistant general manager in 1988. Although the majority of McCarthy's CFL career has been spent with the Tiger-Cats, he was also the vice president and general manager of the Toronto Argonauts, (1989 to 1993), Football Operations and Player Personnel for the Ottawa Rough Riders, (1994), president and CEO of the B.C. Lions, where he recruited Now Senator David Braley as the new owner of The Lions. (1996), and a scout for the Montreal Alouettes, (2008) to June 2013. Then Joining The B.C. Lions as an Eastern Scout in July 2013 to the present.

=== Hamilton Tiger-Cats (1985-1989, 1995,1996, 1997-2007) ===
During his first five seasons with Hamilton, the Tiger-Cats qualified for the post-season each year, playing in three Grey Cups (1985, 1986 and 1989), winning the 74th Grey Cup Championship in 1986. McCarthy was instrumental in recruiting several top players such as Most Outstanding Player nominees for the Eastern Division, wide receivers Tony Champion (1989), Earl Winfield (1988) and quarterbacks Mike Kerrigan and Ken Hobart (1985).

In 1995, he returned to Hamilton as Player Personnel Consultant and played an instrumental role in signing quarterback Matt Dunigan to the Tiger-Cats before moving on to become president and CEO of the B.C. Lions in 1996.

In 1997, McCarthy returned to the Tiger-Cats, and would remain with the organization for the next 11 seasons under varying Football Operations capacities, the latter part of his tenure in 2006–2007 as the senior advisor of football operations, responsible for day-to-day scouting activities and advising then Ticats General Manager Marcel Desjardins on player personnel matters.

McCarthy's extensive career with Hamilton has seen the Tiger-Cats make the playoffs on nine occasions, reaching the Grey Cup five times and winning it all in 1986 and most recently, the 87th Grey Cup, in 1999.

=== Toronto Argonauts ===
McCarthy's stint with the Toronto Argonauts began in November 1989 as general manager. Within a few months he added the title of vice president of football operations, assuming the duties of the club president.

While with the Argonauts McCarthy earned several distinctions. In 1990 the club set a new CFL single season scoring record with 689 points. He was instrumental in key player acquisitions such as trading 7 player to B.C. to bring Matt Dunigan to Toronto in 1990 going on to playing in the Eastern Final in Winnipeg, only to lose in the closing seconds with the Argos playing with their 5th Quarterback, due to injuries. In 1991, he acquired top ranked Notre Dame star Raghib "Rocket" Ismail, awarding him the largest contract in CFL history. The Argos would go on to capture the 79th Grey Cup championship, earning McCarthy the honour of being the youngest general manager ever to win a CFL championship with his prized acquisition, Ismail, earning the Grey Cup MVP award. In 1993, he brought Tracy Ham to Toronto when he orchestrated the largest trades in the history of professional football with the Edmonton Eskimos, which saw 16 players switch teams, 8 from each side. The disaster of the trade was also exacerbated by Ham struggling to adapt to the Run & Shoot offense. While in Toronto, McCarthy was also the team's alternate governor was on numerous league committees, and was the club's acting president.

=== Ottawa Rough Riders ===
In 1994 McCarthy moved to Ottawa and became consultant for football operations and player personnel for the Rough Riders and also served as a player personnel consultant for the AFL's (Arena Football League) Tampa Bay Storm that season.

=== British Columbia Lions ===
In 1996, McCarthy became the president and chief executive officer for the B.C. Lions. After an 0–4 start to the season under quarterback Andre Ware, McCarthy signed all-star quarterback Damon Allen to be their new starting quarterback. He would go on to play with the Lions for the next seven seasons. After undergoing an ownership change at the conclusion of the season, McCarthy left the Lions and returned to the Hamilton Tiger-Cats for the next 6 seasons. Update McCarthy Rejoined the Lions as a Scout in July 2013 to cover the NFL, And continues as an Eastern Regional scout in 2014.

=== Montreal Alouettes ===
Since 2008 to present, McCarthy is currently a college and pro scout with the Montreal Alouettes. In his five seasons with Montreal they have won two Grey Cup Championships in 2009 and 2010 the ( 97th and 98th Grey Cups back to back ) Alouettes qualified for the 96th Grey Cup which they hosted, with a hard-fought loss to the Calgary Stampeders. This has marked the 4th and 5th Grey Cup victories of his career and the seventh, eight and ninth time he has been involved with a team that has reached the Grey Cup.
