= Vic Rapp =

American-Canadian football coach (1929–2016)

Personal information
- Born: December 23, 1929; Marionville, Missouri, U.S.
- Died: October 24, 2016 (aged 86); Orlando, Florida, U.S.

Career information
- College: Southwest Missouri State University

Career history

Coaching
- 1967–1971: Missouri (Ends coach)
- 1972–1976: Edmonton Eskimos (OC)
- 1977–1982: BC Lions (HC)
- 1983: Houston Oilers (ST coach)
- 1984: Los Angeles Rams (WR coach)
- 1985–1986: Tampa Bay Buccaneers (RB coach)
- 1987–1988: Detroit Lions (RB coach)
- 1989–1992: Chicago Bears (WR coach)
- 1996–2000: Arizona Cardinals (WR coach)

Operations
- 1995: Philadelphia Eagles (Scout)

Awards and highlights
- Grey Cup champion (63rd); Annis Stukus Trophy (1977); BC Lions Wall of Fame (2010)

Victor Max Rapp (December 23, 1929 – October 24, 2016) was an American and Canadian football coach who served as the head coach of the BC Lions from 1977 to 1982.

== Early career ==
Rapp was born in 1929 in Marionville, Missouri. A graduate of the University of Missouri, Rapp served as the Tigers end coach from 1967 to 1971. In 1972, he became the offensive coordinator of the Canadian Football League's Edmonton Eskimos. During his tenure in Edmonton, the Eskimos appeared in the Grey Cup four times; winning in 1975. Rapp left Edmonton in 1977 to become the receivers coach at Miami. Less than three weeks after accepting the Miami job, BC Lions general manager Bob Ackles hired Rapp to replace Cal Murphy as Lions head coach.

== BC Lions ==
In his first season as Lions coach, Rapp led the Lions to a 10–6 record and was named the Canadian Football League's Coach of the Year. The Lions made the playoffs three times under Rapp but never advanced past the Western Final. After six seasons in Vancouver without a championship, Ackles felt that Rapp would not be able to lead the Lions to a championship and fired him.

=== Coaching record ===
Team	Year	Regular season					Postseason		
Team	Year	Won	Lost	Ties	Win %	Finish	Won	Lost	Result
BC	1977	10	6	0	.625	2nd in West Division	1	1	Lost in West Final
BC	1978	7	7	2	.500	4th in West Division	0	0	Missed playoffs
BC	1979	9	6	1	.600	3rd in West Division	0	1	Lost in West Semifinal
BC	1980	8	7	1	.533	4th in West Division	0	0	Missed playoffs
BC	1981	10	6	0	.625	3rd in West Division	1	1	Lost in West Final
BC	1982	9	7	0	.563	4th in West Division	0	0	Missed playoffs
Total		53	39	4	.576		2	3	

== Later career ==
After his firing, Rapp served as an assistant with the Houston Oilers, Los Angeles Rams, Tampa Bay Buccaneers, Detroit Lions, Chicago Bears, and Arizona Cardinals. He spent one season as a scout for the Philadelphia Eagles.

Rapp retired to Orlando, Florida. He died on October 24, 2016.
