= Rick Klassen =

Canadian football player (1959–2016)

Profile
- Position: Defensive tackle

Personal information
- Born: July 25, 1959; Sardis, British Columbia, Canada
- Died: December 10, 2016 (aged 57); Maple Ridge, British Columbia, Canada

Career information
- University: Simon Fraser University

Career history
- 1981–1987: BC Lions
- 1988: Saskatchewan Roughriders
- 1989–1990: BC Lions

Awards and highlights
- Grey Cup champion (1985); Dick Suderman Trophy (1983); CFL West All-Star (1985)

Richard Danny Klassen (July 25, 1959 – December 10, 2016) was a defensive lineman who played in the Canadian Football League (CFL) for the BC Lions from 1981 to 1987 and again in 1989 and 1990, and the Saskatchewan Roughriders in 1988.

In 2003, Klassen was voted a member of the B.C. Lions All-Time Dream Team, at defensive tackle, as part of the team's 50th season anniversary celebration. On July 19, 2007, he was inducted onto B.C. Lions Wall of Fame at BC Place Stadium as a part of the 1985 Grey Cup championship team. He died from cancer in 2016.

Klassen's family donated his brain to research and discovered that he had had "chronic traumatic encephalopathy (CTE) in combination with dementia" and that it was "of the worst they've ever seen."

== College career ==
Klassen was recruited by Simon Fraser University as a running back from Sardis Secondary School, Chilliwack, B.C., and played his four years of college football with the Clan.

Klassen chose to play his football at SFU because, during the 1970s, it was considered the best football school in Canada and has produced over 160 football players who have gone on to play pro football. In his freshman year, Klassen served as the Clan's backup running back, behind all-star Rick House but, during off-season training between his freshman and sophomore year, he went from 195 to 225 pounds and was immediately switched to the Clan's offensive line. He spent the rest of his three years at SFU at offensive guard.

== Early CFL career ==
Klassen was drafted in 1981 as an offensive guard by the British Columbia Lions as a territorial draft pick. Eight games into the 1981 CFL season, head coach Vic Rapp saw Klassen's potential on the defensive side of the ball and he switched him to defensive tackle after defensive lineman Rick Goltz sustained a season-ending injury. In the 1981 Western Semi-Final, his first ever CFL playoff game, Klassen picked up three sacks against the Winnipeg Blue Bombers and helped the Lions win 15–11 in an upset at Winnipeg Stadium. The next week in Edmonton, Klassen played in his first ever Western Final. B.C. almost pulled off the unbelievable but fell short against the Edmonton Eskimos dynasty, as Warren Moon hit Brian Kelly for a late touchdown to beat the Lions, 22–16. Klassen played at the defensive tackle position until the 1983 season, when newly hired head coach Don Matthews put him at rush end in his 3-4 defense. In 1984, however, when Matthews, former Edmonton defensive co-ordinator, traded for James "Quick" Parker from the Eskimos, Klassen again switched positions. He was put back inside at defensive tackle, where he stayed for the rest of his CFL career. In June 1983, he retired from football due to a contract dispute, but returned nine days later.

== Career highlights ==
Klassen played in two Grey Cup games during the B.C. Lions' glory years in the mid-1980s, where he played the two best games of his CFL career. His first Grey Cup experience came in 1983 when the Lions hosted the championship game during the inaugural year of BC Place. That year, the Lions hosted the Western Final for the first time since their 1964 Grey Cup championship and beat Winnipeg, 39–21. In the 71st Grey Cup, the Lions built up a 17-7 half-time lead but, unfortunately, weren't able to maintain the lead, eventually losing to the Toronto Argonauts 18–17 in front of 59,345 fans at BC Place. Klassen was a force at defensive end during the 1983 Grey Cup, earning 2.5 sacks and the Grey Cup's Most Valuable Canadian honours. Two years later, Klassen was given another shot at winning the Grey Cup. B.C. got back to the Grey Cup in 1985 in what might be considered the greatest Lions team in club history. The team breezed through the 1985 CFL season, finishing with a club-record 13–3 mark to finish first place in the West Division and host their third consecutive Western Final. The Leos dominated the Winnipeg Blue Bombers at BC Place, winning it 42–22. In the 73rd Grey Cup, B.C. continued its dominance against the Hamilton Tiger-Cats en route to a 37–24 victory at Olympic Stadium in Montreal, ending a 21-year drought. Klassen again played an outstanding game at defensive tackle, pressuring and sacking Hamilton quarterback Ken Hobart twice during the game to earn what would be his only Grey Cup championship, however his heroic effort at Olympic Stadium was overshadowed by the play of James "Quick" Parker, who was named the Grey Cup's Most Valuable Player on Defence. Klassen finished his CFL career second all-time in Grey Cup sacks with 4.5, only behind Tyrone Jones.

The next two years, the B.C. Lions were close again but weren't able to get past the Edmonton Eskimos in the 1986 and 1987 Western Finals, losing 41–5 at Commonwealth Stadium in 1986 and 31–7 at BC Place in 1987. In the years following their 1985 Grey Cup victory, the Lions faced some hard times off the field and Klassen soon found himself in Saskatchewan. General manager Bob Ackles left the Lions in 1986 for a job with the National Football League's Dallas Cowboys and the team proceeded to hire Joe Galat as its new general manager. After a 3-game losing streak midway through the 1987 CFL season, Don Matthews was fired as the Lions head coach by Galat and replaced by Larry Donovan. In 1988, after spending the first seven seasons of his career with B.C., Klassen was traded to the Saskatchewan Roughriders during the off-season after Galat was hired. Klassen spent one season in Regina, where he helped bring Saskatchewan out of its dark years and led the Roughriders to an 11–7 record and their first home playoff game since 1976. Saskatchewan was beaten by Klassen's old team, the B.C. Lions, 42–18 in the Western Semi-Final and the Roughriders had yet to host a home playoff before hosting Calgary in the Western Semifinal during the 2007 CFL season. Klassen returned to his home in B.C. for his final two season with the Lions. He announced his retirement after the 1990 CFL season.
