= Ian Sinclair (Canadian football) =

Canadian football player (born 1960)

No. 55
- Position: Offensive lineman

Personal information
- Born: July 22, 1960 (age 66); Toronto, Ontario, Canada

Career information
- College: University of Miami

Career history
- 1985–1995: BC Lions

Awards and highlights
- 2× Grey Cup champion (1985, 1994); National champion (1983)

Ian Sinclair (born July 22, 1960) is a Canadian former professional football offensive lineman who played eleven seasons in the Canadian Football League (CFL) for the BC Lions. He played college football at the University of Miami where he was part of the 1983 Miami Hurricanes football team national champions. He also was a part of the Lions Grey Cup victories in 1985 and 1994.
