= Nelson Skalbania =

Canadian engineer and businessman

- Born: February 12, 1938 (age 88); Vancouver, British Columbia, Canada
- Education: University of British Columbia; California Institute of Technology
- Occupations: Businessman, Sports Franchise Owner, Engineer

Nelson Mathew Skalbania (born February 12, 1938) is an engineer and businessman from Vancouver, British Columbia, who is best known for signing a then 17-year-old Wayne Gretzky to the Indianapolis Racers of the World Hockey Association, and for his high-profile real estate flipping.

== Early life and education ==
In 1961, Skalbania earned his Bachelor of Applied Science degree from the University of British Columbia, then received a Professional Engineer (P.Eng.) designation in 1962, followed by a Master of Science in Civil Engineering, in 1964, from the California Institute of Technology (Caltech).

== Career ==
During his career, Skalbania earned notoriety for flipping properties, both real and franchised.

=== Consulting ===
Beginning with the company as a one-third owner in 1964; by 1971, Skalbania attained the position of president and majority owner of McKenzie Snowball & Skalbania, structural, electrical, and mechanical consulting engineers, with over 100 staff in four locations, later dissolving the company, in 1981.

=== 1982 bankruptcy filing and aftermath ===
On December 8, 1982, news agency UPI reported that Skalbania, who had publicly vowed, during the previous month, to never file for bankruptcy, had announced, on Vancouver radio station CKNW, that he had filed for personal bankruptcy. A week later, he submitted an unprecedented proposal "under the Bankruptcy Act that called for his 125 unsecured creditors to allow him five years to repay $30.3 million in debts." On January 13, 1983, 120 of Skalbania's 125 creditors accepted his proposal; however, in April 1989, Maclean's magazine reported that "most received nothing and now Skalbania has no further legal obligation to repay the debt," while in 1989, he had "earned millions on prime Vancouver real estate and he says that he plans to close deals totalling at least $200 million in April."

=== Real estate ===
Skalbania's 1970s real estate flipping activities were reflected by more than 1000 transactions yearly, valued at close to US$500 million annually; in example:

- 31 Eaton's stores across Canada, purchased across the 1970s
- Bought and resold multiple properties from Genstar Development Company, over three years
- Omni Complex (now CNN Center) in Atlanta, Georgia, then resold to Ted Turner
- Purchased Circus World in Orlando, Florida from Mattel, then quickly sold it to the owners of SeaWorld
- Opera Square in San Francisco
- Watergate Apartments, Oakland, California.

=== Sports ===
In the latter 20th century, Skalbania bought and subsequently sold, or folded, several sports teams, including:

- Bought and sold the Edmonton Oilers and Indianapolis Racers of the World Hockey Association.
- Bought the Atlanta Flames of the National Hockey League, and moved them to Calgary.
- Bought and folded the original Montreal Alouettes of the Canadian Football League, a team related to the current one only by name. Fans were infuriated by his remark, "It's not like I raped a nun."
- Bought and sold (after also moving this team to Calgary) the Memphis Rogues of the North American Soccer League.
- Bought and sold the Vancouver Canadians Class AAA baseball team.
- Bought the BC Lions of the Canadian Football League in 1996, but was forced into receivership.

Skalbania also made an unsuccessful bid to purchase the Seattle Mariners of Major League Baseball; the team was eventually sold to George Argyros.

=== 1990s to present ===
In 1994, Skalbania incorporated Taurus Enterprises, Inc., on January 5, 1994, and re-incorporated in Nevada on August 20, 1996, as Salvage World, Inc. On December 17, 1997, then effecting a plan of reorganization and merger of Salvage World, Inc., into Solar Energy Limited, a private Delaware corporation, changed the company name and moved its headquarters from Nevada to Delaware, while also acquiring Hydro-Air Technologies, Inc., initially as a wholly owned subsidiary.

On August 10, 2005, the company acquired Planktos, Inc. from Russ George. On August 18, 2005, the company also acquired D2Fusion, Inc. from Russ George; each operated as a wholly owned subsidiary.

In 2007, Skalbania was CEO of Regal RV Resorts, Inc., a major shareholder in Planktos, Inc. and D2Fusion, Inc., subsidiaries focused on renewable energy sources, including cold fusion, with a facility in Los Alamos, New Mexico.

== 1997 arrest and conviction ==
In 1995, Skalbania was arrested, acquitted, then, in 1997, convicted on appeal of appropriating $100,000 from a prospective real estate partner, Richmond, B.C. businessman Gordon Gooch, for having assigned the investment to his then-overdrawn company account, rather than having placed it into a Prime Realty Ltd. trust, as prescribed. Funds were also deposited into N. M. Skalbania Ltd. Nelson returned Gooch's money three months later, with $4,000 in interest.

The intervention of prominent friends who testified on his behalf enabled Skalbania to avoid a jail term and, instead, spent nearly a year on parole wearing an ankle monitor, which was removed in December 1999.

== Personal life ==
Skalbania has married twice, first, to Audrey Anna Lynn Leschynsky (1938-2018), with whom he had two daughters, Rozanda Lyn and Taryn Gae Taylor, and, later, to Eleni (1943-2013), a native of Santorini, Greece, who later founded Vancouver's Wedgewood Hotel & Spa.
