= Bob Ackles =

Sports executive (1938–2008)

Robert Ackles
Profile
- Positions: President, general manager

Personal information
- Born: September 16, 1938; Sarnia, Ontario, Canada
- Died: July 6, 2008 (aged 69); Vancouver, British Columbia, Canada

Career history
- 1975–1986: BC Lions
- 1987–1991: Dallas Cowboys
- 1992–1994: Phoenix Cardinals
- 1995: Philadelphia Eagles
- 1996–2000: Miami Dolphins
- 2001: Las Vegas Outlaws
- 2002–2008: BC Lions

Awards and highlights
- instrumental in the development of the short lived XFL.; BC Amateur Football Builders Award, 1980; Schenley Award (1986); Special Award Contribution to Junior Football - British Columbia; Bob Ackles Day - Vancouver, 1986; Key to the City of Vancouver, 1986; Key to the City of Kelowna, 1986
- Canadian Football Hall of Fame (Class of 2002)

Robert Ackles (September 16, 1938 – July 6, 2008) was a Canadian Football League executive for the BC Lions. He also was an American football executive in the National Football League. He was inducted into the Canadian Football Hall of Fame in 2002.

== Early life ==
Ackles was born in Sarnia, Ontario and joined the BC Lions as a water boy in their founding year, 1954, at the age of 16.

== Professional career ==
Ackles grew professionally through the ranks of the BC Lions organization. He worked his way through his college studies as the Lions' equipment manager. He became the director of football development in 1966 and assistant general manager in 1971. He was promoted to general manager in 1975, a position he held for 11 years until 1986. He would perform virtually every administrative duty during his 32-year career with the BC Lions. Under his leadership, the BC Lions became one of the CFL's winningest teams, moved into a new stadium and built a new training facility. In 1985, the club won the Grey Cup.

In July 1986, he joined the Dallas Cowboys as the franchise's first Director of Pro Personnel. In May 1989, he was named the Cowboys' Director of Player Personnel.

Ackles was instrumental in the development of the XFL. The XFL disbanded after its lone season in 2001. The following year, in 2002, Ackles returned to the Lions as President and CEO, a position he held until his death of a myocardial infarction on July 6, 2008.

Ackles' autobiography, The Water Boy, was published in 2007 and recounted his life and time in all three leagues and the future of the CFL. Ackles was inducted into the Canadian Football Hall of Fame as a Builder in 2002, the BC Sports Hall of Fame in 2004, and is the only non-player to ever be awarded the Schenley Award (1986).
