= 52nd Grey Cup =

1964 Canadian Football championship game

BC Lions	Hamilton Tiger-Cats
(11–2–3)	(10–3–1)
34	24
Head coach: Dave Skrien	Head coach: Ralph Sazio
	1	2	3	4	Total
BC Lions	7	13	14	0	34
Hamilton Tiger-Cats	0	1	7	16	24
- Date: November 28, 1964
- Stadium: CNE Stadium
- Location: Toronto
- Attendance: 32,655

Broadcasters
- Network: CBC, CTV, SRC
- Announcers: Dan Kelly and Bud Grant

The 52nd Grey Cup was hosted at CNE Stadium in Toronto, Ontario on November 28, 1964. The BC Lions defeated the Hamilton Tiger-Cats 34–24, the first Grey Cup victory for BC.

== Bill Munsey on offence and defence ==
BC player Bill Munsey scored two touchdowns in the third quarter, one on offence and another on defence. Having replaced injured running back Bob Swift, he took a handoff from quarterback Joe Kapp, and broke over right guard for an 18-yard touchdown. Later in the quarter, at the BC 35-yard line, Hamilton quarterback Bernie Faloney lateraled to halfback Johnny Counts, who dropped the ball. In the ensuing scramble for the fumbled ball, Munsey picked it up and ran 71 yards for another touchdown. Bob Swift, Willie Fleming and Jim Carphin also scored TDs for the Lions, the latter on a pass from Pete Ohler on a botched field goal attempt.
