= List of Canadian Football League annual passing leaders =

The Canadian Football League (CFL) was officially formed in 1958. Statistics for the IRFU/Eastern Division date back to 1954 whereas WIFU/Western Division statistics date back to 1950.

== Passing yards ==
Key
Symbol	Meaning
Player	The player who recorded the most passing yards in the league
Yds	The total number of passing yards the player had
†	Former league record
*	Current record
(#)	Denotes the number of times a player appears in this list

CFL annual passing yards leaders by season
Season	Player	Yds	Team
1950	Lindy Berry	2,201†	Edmonton Eskimos
1951	Jack Jacobs	3,248†	Winnipeg Blue Bombers
1952	Jack Jacobs (2)	2,586	Winnipeg Blue Bombers
1953	Jack Jacobs (3)	1,924	Winnipeg Blue Bombers
1954	Sam Etcheverry	3,610†	Montreal Alouettes
1955	Sam Etcheverry (2)	3,657†	Montreal Alouettes
1956	Sam Etcheverry (3)	4,723	Montreal Alouettes
1957	Sam Etcheverry (4)	3,341	Montreal Alouettes
1958	Sam Etcheverry (5)	3,548	Montreal Alouettes
1959	Sam Etcheverry (6)	3,133	Montreal Alouettes
1960	Tobin Rote	4,247	Toronto Argonauts
1961	Tobin Rote (2)	3,093	Toronto Argonauts
1962	Joe Kapp	3,279	BC Lions
1963	Eagle Day	3,126	Calgary Stampeders
1964	Joe Kapp (2)	2,816	BC Lions
1965	Joe Kapp (3)	2,961	BC Lions
1966	Ron Lancaster	2,976	Saskatchewan Roughriders
1967	Pete Liske	4,479	Calgary Stampeders
1968	Pete Liske (2)	4,333	Calgary Stampeders
1969	Russ Jackson	3,641	Ottawa Rough Riders
1970	Ron Lancaster (2)	2,779	Saskatchewan Roughriders
1971	Don Jonas	4,036	Winnipeg Blue Bombers
1972	Don Jonas (2)	3,583	Winnipeg Blue Bombers
1973	Ron Lancaster (3)	3,767	Saskatchewan Roughriders
1974	Pete Liske (3)	3,259	Calgary Stampeders
1975	Ron Lancaster (4)	3,545	Saskatchewan Roughriders
1976	Ron Lancaster (5)	3,869	Saskatchewan Roughriders
1977	Ron Lancaster (6)	3,072	Saskatchewan Roughriders
1978	Dieter Brock	3,755	Winnipeg Blue Bombers
1979	Tom Clements	2,803	Saskatchewan Roughriders
1980	Dieter Brock (2)	4,254	Winnipeg Blue Bombers
1981	Dieter Brock (3)	4,796†	Winnipeg Blue Bombers
1982	Warren Moon	5,000†	Edmonton Eskimos
1983	Warren Moon (2)	5,648†	Edmonton Eskimos
1984	Dieter Brock (4)	3,966	Hamilton Tiger-Cats
1985	Roy Dewalt	4,237	BC Lions
1986	Rick Johnson	4,379	Calgary Stampeders
1987	Tom Clements (2)	4,686	Winnipeg Blue Bombers
1988	Gilbert Renfroe	4,113	Toronto Argonauts
1989	Matt Dunigan	4,509	BC Lions
1990	Kent Austin	4,604	Saskatchewan Roughriders
1991	Doug Flutie	6,619*	BC Lions
1992	Kent Austin (2)	6,225	Saskatchewan Roughriders
1993	Doug Flutie (2)	6,092	Calgary Stampeders
1994	Doug Flutie (3)	5,726	Calgary Stampeders
1995	Matt Dunigan (2)	4,911	Birmingham Barracudas
1996	Doug Flutie (4)	5,720	Toronto Argonauts
1997	Doug Flutie (5)	5,505	Toronto Argonauts
1998	Kerwin Bell	4,991	Toronto Argonauts
1999	Danny McManus	5,335	Hamilton Tiger-Cats
2000	Damon Allen	4,840	BC Lions
2001	Khari Jones	4,545	Winnipeg Blue Bombers
2002	Khari Jones (2)	5,334	Winnipeg Blue Bombers
2003	Anthony Calvillo	5,891	Montreal Alouettes
2004	Anthony Calvillo (2)	6,041	Montreal Alouettes
2005	Anthony Calvillo (3)	5,556	Montreal Alouettes
2006	Ricky Ray	5,000	Edmonton Eskimos
2007	Kevin Glenn	5,114	Winnipeg Blue Bombers
2008	Ricky Ray (2)	5,661	Edmonton Eskimos
2009	Ricky Ray (3)	4,916	Edmonton Eskimos
2010	Darian Durant	5,542	Saskatchewan Roughriders
2011	Anthony Calvillo (4)	5,251	Montreal Alouettes
2012	Henry Burris	5,367	Hamilton Tiger-Cats
2013	Henry Burris (2)	4,925	Hamilton Tiger-Cats
2014	Ricky Ray (4)	4,595	Toronto Argonauts
2015	Henry Burris (3)	5,693	Ottawa Redblacks
2016	Michael Reilly	5,554	Edmonton Eskimos
2017	Michael Reilly (2)	5,830	Edmonton Eskimos
2018	Michael Reilly (3)	5,562	Edmonton Eskimos
2019	Cody Fajardo	4,302	Saskatchewan Roughriders
2020	Season cancelled		
2021	Michael Reilly (4)	3,283	BC Lions
2022	McLeod Bethel-Thompson	4,731	Toronto Argonauts
2023	Vernon Adams	4,769	BC Lions
2024	Bo Levi Mitchell	5,451	Hamilton Tiger-Cats
2025	Bo Levi Mitchell (2)	5,296	Hamilton Tiger-Cats
2026	Trevor Harris	5,370	Saskatchewan Roughriders

== Passing touchdowns ==
Key
Symbol	Meaning
Player	The player who recorded the most passing touchdowns in the league
TDs	The total number of passing touchdowns the player had
†	Former league record
*	Current record
(#)	Denotes the number of times a player appears in this list

CFL annual passing touchdowns leaders by season
Season	Player	TDs	Team
1950	Jack Jacobs	14†	Winnipeg Blue Bombers
1951	Jack Jacobs (2)	33†	Winnipeg Blue Bombers
1952	Jack Jacobs (3)	34†	Winnipeg Blue Bombers
1953	Sam Etcheverry	24	Montreal Alouettes
1954	Sam Etcheverry (2)	25	Montreal Alouettes
1955	Sam Etcheverry (3)	30	Montreal Alouettes
1955	Tom Dublinski	30	Toronto Argonauts
1956	Sam Etcheverry (4)	32	Montreal Alouettes
1956	Arnold Galiffa	32	BC Lions
1957	Sam Etcheverry (5)	14	Montreal Alouettes
1958	Frank Tripucka	20	Saskatchewan Roughriders
1959	Jim Van Pelt	31	Winnipeg Blue Bombers
1960	Tobin Rote	38†	Toronto Argonauts
1961	Bernie Faloney	23	Hamilton Tiger-Cats
1962	Joe Kapp	28	BC Lions
1963	Joe Kapp (2)	20	BC Lions
1964	Russ Jackson	18	Ottawa Rough Riders
1965	Russ Jackson (2)	18	Ottawa Rough Riders
1966	Ron Lancaster	28	Saskatchewan Roughriders
1967	Pete Liske	40†	Calgary Stampeders
1968	Pete Liske (2)	31	Calgary Stampeders
1969	Russ Jackson (3)	33	Ottawa Rough Riders
1970	Jerry Keeling	18	Calgary Stampeders
1970	Gary Wood	18	Ottawa Rough Riders
1971	Don Jonas	27	Winnipeg Blue Bombers
1972	Don Jonas (2)	27	Winnipeg Blue Bombers
1973	Ron Lancaster (2)	22	Saskatchewan Roughriders
1974	Ron Lancaster (3)	20	Saskatchewan Roughriders
1975	Ron Lancaster (4)	23	Saskatchewan Roughriders
1976	Ron Lancaster (5)	25	Saskatchewan Roughriders
1977	Dieter Brock	23	Winnipeg Blue Bombers
1978	Dieter Brock (2)	23	Winnipeg Blue Bombers
1979	Warren Moon	20	Edmonton Eskimos
1980	Dieter Brock (3)	28	Winnipeg Blue Bombers
1981	Dieter Brock (4)	32	Winnipeg Blue Bombers
1982	Warren Moon (2)	36	Edmonton Eskimos
1983	Warren Moon (3)	31	Edmonton Eskimos
1984	Tom Clements	29	Winnipeg Blue Bombers
1985	Roy Dewalt	27	BC Lions
1986	Rick Johnson	31	Calgary Stampeders
1987	Tom Clements (2)	33	Winnipeg Blue Bombers
1988	Gilbert Renfroe	26	Toronto Argonauts
1988	Matt Dunigan	26	BC Lions
1989	Tracy Ham	30	Edmonton Eskimos
1990	Tracy Ham (2)	36	Edmonton Eskimos
1991	Doug Flutie	38	BC Lions
1992	Kent Austin	35	Saskatchewan Roughriders
1993	Doug Flutie (2)	44†	Calgary Stampeders
1994	Doug Flutie (3)	48*	Calgary Stampeders
1995	Matt Dunigan (2)	34	Birmingham Barracudas
1996	Doug Flutie (4)	29	Toronto Argonauts
1997	Doug Flutie (5)	47	Toronto Argonauts
1998	Jeff Garcia	28	Calgary Stampeders
1999	Danny McManus	28	Hamilton Tiger-Cats
2000	Dave Dickenson	36	Calgary Stampeders
2001	Khari Jones	30	Winnipeg Blue Bombers
2002	Khari Jones (2)	46	Winnipeg Blue Bombers
2003	Anthony Calvillo	37	Montreal Alouettes
2004	Casey Printers	35	BC Lions
2005	Anthony Calvillo (2)	34	Montreal Alouettes
2006	Henry Burris	23	Calgary Stampeders
2007	Henry Burris (2)	34	Calgary Stampeders
2008	Anthony Calvillo (3)	43	Montreal Alouettes
2009	Anthony Calvillo (4)	26	Montreal Alouettes
2010	Henry Burris (3)	38	Calgary Stampeders
2011	Anthony Calvillo (5)	32	Montreal Alouettes
2012	Henry Burris (4)	43	Hamilton Tiger-Cats
2013	Darian Durant	31	Saskatchewan Roughriders
2014	Ricky Ray	28	Toronto Argonauts
2015	Trevor Harris	33	Toronto Argonauts
2016	Bo Levi Mitchell	32	Calgary Stampeders
2017	Michael Reilly	30	Edmonton Eskimos
2017	Trevor Harris (2)	30	Ottawa Redblacks
2018	Bo Levi Mitchell (2)	35	Calgary Stampeders
2019	McLeod Bethel-Thompson	26	Toronto Argonauts
2020	Season cancelled		
2021	Zach Collaros	20	Winnipeg Blue Bombers
2022	Zach Collaros (2)	37	Winnipeg Blue Bombers
2023	Zach Collaros (3)	33	Winnipeg Blue Bombers
2024	Bo Levi Mitchell (3)	32	Hamilton Tiger-Cats
2025	Bo Levi Mitchell (4)	36	Hamilton Tiger-Cats
2026	Vernon Adams	36	Calgary Stampeders

== Passing completions ==
Key
Symbol	Meaning
Player	The player who recorded the most passing completions in the league
Comp	The total number of passing completions the player had
†	Former league record
*	Current record
(#)	Denotes the number of times a player appears in this list

CFL annual passing completions leaders by season
Season	Player	Comp	Team
1950	Lindy Berry	129†	Edmonton Eskimos
1951	Jack Jacobs	204†	Winnipeg Blue Bombers
1952	Jack Jacobs (2)	147	Winnipeg Blue Bombers
1953	Sam Etcheverry	166	Montreal Alouettes
1954	Sam Etcheverry (2)	206†	Montreal Alouettes
1955	Sam Etcheverry (3)	227†	Montreal Alouettes
1956	Sam Etcheverry (4)	276†	Montreal Alouettes
1957	Sam Etcheverry (5)	215	Montreal Alouettes
1958	Sam Etcheverry (6)	247	Montreal Alouettes
1959	Sam Etcheverry (7)	231	Montreal Alouettes
1960	Tobin Rote	256	Toronto Argonauts
1961	Tobin Rote (2)	220	Toronto Argonauts
1962	Joe Kapp	197	BC Lions
1963	Eagle Day	228	Calgary Stampeders
1964	Joe Kapp (2)	194	BC Lions
1965	Joe Kapp (3)	219	BC Lions
1966	Ron Lancaster	211	Saskatchewan Roughriders
1967	Pete Liske	303†	Calgary Stampeders
1968	Pete Liske (2)	271	Calgary Stampeders
1969	Jerry Keeling	229	Calgary Stampeders
1970	Don Trull	185	Edmonton Eskimos
1971	Don Jonas	253	Winnipeg Blue Bombers
1972	Don Jonas (2)	252	Winnipeg Blue Bombers
1973	Ron Lancaster (2)	263	Saskatchewan Roughriders
1974	Pete Liske (3)	228	Calgary Stampeders
1975	Ron Lancaster (3)	239	Saskatchewan Roughriders
1976	Ron Lancaster (4)	297	Saskatchewan Roughriders
1977	Ron Lancaster (5)	255	Saskatchewan Roughriders
1978	Dieter Brock	294	Winnipeg Blue Bombers
1979	Tony Adams	241	Toronto Argonauts
1980	Dieter Brock (2)	304†	Winnipeg Blue Bombers
1981	Dieter Brock (3)	354†	Winnipeg Blue Bombers
1982	Tom Clements	356†	Hamilton Tiger-Cats
1983	Warren Moon	380†	Edmonton Eskimos
1984	Dieter Brock (4)	320	Hamilton Tiger-Cats
1985	Roy Dewalt	301	BC Lions
1986	Roy Dewalt (2)	314	BC Lions
1987	Tom Clements (2)	336	Winnipeg Blue Bombers
1988	Gilbert Renfroe	290	Toronto Argonauts
1989	Matt Dunigan	331	BC Lions
1990	Kent Austin	360	Saskatchewan Roughriders
1991	Doug Flutie	466†	BC Lions
1992	Kent Austin (2)	459	Saskatchewan Roughriders
1993	Doug Flutie (2)	416	Calgary Stampeders
1994	Doug Flutie (3)	403	Calgary Stampeders
1995	Matt Dunigan (2)	362	Birmingham Barracudas
1996	Doug Flutie (4)	434	Toronto Argonauts
1997	Doug Flutie (5)	430	Toronto Argonauts
1998	Kerwin Bell	381	Toronto Argonauts
1999	Danny McManus	365	Hamilton Tiger-Cats
2000	Damon Allen	324	BC Lions
2001	Khari Jones	229	Winnipeg Blue Bombers
2002	Khari Jones (2)	282	Winnipeg Blue Bombers
2003	Anthony Calvillo	408	Montreal Alouettes
2004	Anthony Calvillo (2)	431	Montreal Alouettes
2005	Ricky Ray	479†	Edmonton Eskimos
2006	Ricky Ray (2)	406	Edmonton Eskimos
2007	Kevin Glenn	388	Winnipeg Blue Bombers
2008	Anthony Calvillo (3)	472	Montreal Alouettes
2009	Ricky Ray (3)	401	Edmonton Eskimos
2010	Darian Durant	391	Saskatchewan Roughriders
2011	Anthony Calvillo (4)	404	Montreal Alouettes
2012	Henry Burris	391	Hamilton Tiger-Cats
2013	Henry Burris (2)	373	Hamilton Tiger-Cats
2014	Ricky Ray (4)	425	Toronto Argonauts
2015	Henry Burris (3)	481*	Ottawa Redblacks
2016	Michael Reilly	448	Edmonton Eskimos
2017	Ricky Ray (5)	474	Toronto Argonauts
2018	Trevor Harris	431	Ottawa Redblacks
2019	Trevor Harris (2)	343	Edmonton Eskimos
2020	Season cancelled		
2021	Cody Fajardo	281	Saskatchewan Roughriders
2022	McLeod Bethel-Thompson	387	Toronto Argonauts
2023	Jake Maier	363	Calgary Stampeders
2024	Bo Levi Mitchell	420	Hamilton Tiger-Cats
2025	Bo Levi Mitchell (2)	428	Hamilton Tiger-Cats
2026	Trevor Harris	431	Saskatchewan Roughriders

== See also ==
- List of Canadian Football League annual rushing leaders
- List of Canadian Football League annual receiving leaders
