= 1961 BC Lions season =

Canadian football team season

- General manager: Herb Capozzi
- Head coach: Wayne Robinson; Dave Skrien
- Home stadium: Empire Stadium

Results
- Record: 1–13–2
- Division place: 5th, West
- Playoffs: did not qualify

Uniform

The 1961 BC Lions finished the season in fifth place in the Western Conference with a disappointing 1–13–2 record and failed to make the playoffs.

There was, however, a bright side to the season as fundamental building blocks were in place. In the off-season, the Lions signed Linebacker/Guard Tom Brown who would become an important part of the Lions' defense. On August 24, the Lions traded four players to Calgary for Quarterback Joe Kapp and while the results were not immediate they would prove to be critical in future seasons.

Due to the poor record and play, fan attendance dropped drastically, as the Lions averaged 24,000 fans per game. It also cost head coach Wayne Robinson his job as he was fired after winless first seven games in favour of Dave Skrien on September 12.

This was also the first season that the CFL introduced inter-conference games, with the first regular season games against the Ottawa Rough Riders, Hamilton Tiger-Cats, Montreal Alouettes and Toronto Argonauts coming in 1961.

== Preseason ==
Game	Date	Opponent	Results		Venue	Attendance
Game	Date	Opponent	Score	Record	Venue	Attendance
A	Thu, July 20	at Toronto Argonauts	L 17–28	0–1	Exhibition Stadium	22,415
B	Mon, July 24	vs. Hamilton Tiger-Cats	W 38–27	1–1	Empire Stadium	18,769
C	Sat, July 29	vs. Saskatchewan Roughriders	W 13–3	2–1	University of Washington Stadium*	28,000
D	Tue, Aug 1	vs. Ottawa Rough Riders	L 14–22	2–2	Empire Stadium	17,988

- Game played in Seattle.

== Regular season ==
=== Season standings ===
Western Football Conference
Team	GP	W	L	T	PF	PA	Pts
Winnipeg Blue Bombers	16	13	3	0	360	251	26
Edmonton Eskimos	16	10	5	1	334	257	21
Calgary Stampeders	16	7	9	0	300	311	14
Saskatchewan Roughriders	16	5	10	1	211	314	11
BC Lions	16	1	13	2	215	393	4

=== Season schedule ===
Game	Date	Opponent	Results	
Game	Date	Opponent	Score	Record
1	Aug 7	vs. Edmonton Eskimos	L 19–29	0–1
2	Aug 12	at Ottawa Rough Riders	L 7–41	0–2
3	Aug 15	at Hamilton Tiger-Cats	L 21–30	0–3
4	Aug 21	vs. Montreal Alouettes	T 7–7	0–3–1
5	Aug 24	at Saskatchewan Roughriders	L 6–25	0–4–1
6	Aug 28	at Edmonton Eskimos	L 20–21	0–5–1
7	Sept 9	vs. Calgary Stampeders	L 17–35	0–6–1
8	Sept 14	at Winnipeg Blue Bombers	L 15–36	0–7–1
9	Sept 18	vs. Toronto Argonauts	L 7–15	0–8–1
10	Sept 23	at Calgary Stampeders	L 9–28	0–9–1
11	Sept 30	vs. Edmonton Eskimos	W 21–9	1–9–1
12	Oct 7	at Winnipeg Blue Bombers	L 20–24	1–10–1
13	Oct 9	at Saskatchewan Roughriders	L 7–17	1–11–1
14	Oct 16	vs. Winnipeg Blue Bombers	L 15–16	1–12–1
15	Oct 28	vs. Saskatchewan Roughriders	T 17–17	1–12–2
16	Nov 5	vs. Calgary Stampeders	L 7–43	1–13–2

=== Offensive leaders ===
Player	Passing yds	Rushing yds	Receiving yds	TD
Joe Kapp	1719	127	0	0
Nub Beamer		878	108	9
Willie Fleming		468	680	9
Dick Johnson		0	645	4
By Bailey		386	125	1
Pat Claridge		0	327	0

== 1961 CFL awards ==
None
