= 1963 Hamilton Tiger-Cats season =

Season of Canadian Football League team the Hamilton Tiger-Cats

- Head coach: Ralph Sazio
- Home stadium: Civic Stadium

Results
- Record: 10–4
- Division place: 1st, East
- Playoffs: Won Grey Cup

The 1963 Hamilton Tiger-Cats finished in first place in the Eastern Conference with a 10–4 record and won the Grey Cup over the BC Lions.

== Preseason ==
| Week | Date | Opponent | Results | | Venue | Attendance |
| Week | Date | Opponent | Score | Record | Venue | Attendance |
|---|---|---|---|---|---|---|
| A | July 25 | Winnipeg Blue Bombers | W 24–23 | 1–0 | | 8,000 |
| B | Aug 1 | at Montreal Alouettes | L 16–23 | 1–1 | | 19,789 |

== Regular season ==
=== Season standings ===
Eastern Football Conference
| Team | GP | W | L | T | PF | PA | Pts |
|---|---|---|---|---|---|---|---|
| Hamilton Tiger-Cats | 14 | 10 | 4 | 0 | 312 | 214 | 20 |
| Ottawa Rough Riders | 14 | 9 | 5 | 0 | 326 | 284 | 18 |
| Montreal Alouettes | 14 | 6 | 8 | 0 | 277 | 297 | 12 |
| Toronto Argonauts | 14 | 3 | 11 | 0 | 202 | 310 | 6 |

=== Season schedule ===
| Week | Game | Date | Opponent | Results | | Venue | Attendance |
| Week | Game | Date | Opponent | Score | Record | Venue | Attendance |
|---|---|---|---|---|---|---|---|
| 1 | 1 | Aug 10 | vs. Montreal Alouettes | W 30–7 | 1–0 | | 25,709 |
| 2 | 2 | Aug 15 | at Saskatchewan Roughriders | L 3–5 | 1–1 | | 12,609 |
| 2 | 3 | Aug 19 | at Calgary Stampeders | L 31–35 | 1–2 | | 21,034 |
| 3 | 4 | Aug 24 | vs. Ottawa Rough Riders | W 20–16 | 2–2 | | 24,271 |
| 4 | 5 | Sept 2 | vs. Toronto Argonauts | W 7–1 | 3–2 | | 26,318 |
| 5 | 6 | Sept 7 | at Ottawa Rough Riders | L 27–28 | 3–3 | | 19,124 |
| 6 | 7 | Sept 15 | at Toronto Argonauts | L 7–15 | 3–4 | | 30,752 |
| 7 | 8 | Sept 21 | vs. BC Lions | W 38–21 | 4–4 | | 26,652 |
| 8 | 9 | Sept 29 | vs. Montreal Alouettes | W 24–14 | 5–4 | | 23,614 |
| 9 | 10 | Oct 7 | at Winnipeg Blue Bombers | W 26–14 | 6–4 | | 15,340 |
| 10 | 11 | Oct 14 | vs. Edmonton Eskimos | W 28–17 | 7–4 | | 22,642 |
| 11 | 12 | Oct 20 | at Toronto Argonauts | W 11–10 | 8–4 | | 21,196 |
| 12 | 13 | Oct 26 | Ottawa Rough Riders | W 11–10 | 9–4 | | 28,007 |
| 13 | 14 | Nov 3 | at Montreal Alouettes | W 49–21 | 10–4 | | 19,337 |

== Playoffs ==
=== Schedule ===
| Round | Date | Opponent | Results | | Venue | Attendance |
| Round | Date | Opponent | Score | Record | Venue | Attendance |
|---|---|---|---|---|---|---|
| Eastern Final #1 | Nov 16 | at Ottawa Rough Riders | W 45–0 | 1–0 | | 20,406 |
| Eastern Final #2 | Nov 24 | vs. Ottawa Rough Riders | L 17–35 | 1–1 | | 23,972 |
| Grey Cup | Nov 30 | at BC Lions | W 21–10 | 2–1 | | 36,461 |

==== Grey Cup ====
| Teams | Q1 | Q2 | Q3 | Q4 | Final |
|---|---|---|---|---|---|
| Hamilton Tiger-Cats | 7 | 7 | 7 | 0 | 21 |
| BC Lions | 7 | 0 | 3 | 0 | 10 |
