= 1967 BC Lions season =

Canadian football team season

- General manager: Denny Veitch
- Head coach: Jim Champion
- Home stadium: Empire Stadium

Results
- Record: 3–12–1
- Division place: 5th, West
- Playoffs: did not qualify

The 1967 BC Lions finished in fifth place in the Western Conference with a 3–12–1 record after Joe Kapp, Willie Fleming, Tom Hinton, Pat Claridge, Jim Carphin and Dick Fouts left the team following the conclusion of the 1966 season.

During the off-season, general manager Herb Capozzi was elected to the Legislative Assembly of British Columbia and was replaced by Denny Veitch.

Former Hamilton star pivot Bernie Faloney was brought in to replace Kapp. It was Faloney's final year of professional football, and while he threw for a career best 3303 yards, he also threw 21 interceptions and was sacked 35 times. After losing their first five games, Grey Cup winning head coach Dave Skrien was replaced by interim coach Ron Morris and then by Jim Champion. The team was characterized by its lack of offense, only averaging 14.9 points and 1.5 touchdowns per game.

The poor field goal kicking from the previous season resulted in the Lions being the first team to use a specialist kicker in the CFL. Although Ted Gerela did backup at running back, he did represent the transition in the CFL from the era when a regular positional player did the kicking and the era of kickers who do nothing but kick.

Veteran linebacker Norm Fieldgate, who had played with the team since the 1954 expansion, retired at the end of the season after 223 games.

The Lions introduced a new helmet logo: a roaring lion's head with BC inscribed on the cheek. This would be the team's primary mark for the 'lost decade' of Lions football from 1967 to 1977 where the team won more than six games only twice.

== Offseason ==
=== CFL draft ===
Round	Pick	Player	Position	School
1	2	Dick Kohler	End/Wide receiver	Manitoba
2	11	George Brajcich	Guard	UBC
3	20	Ross Tellier	Tackle	Concordia
4	28	Mike Rohan	Center	UBC

== Preseason ==
Game	Date	Opponent	Results		Venue	Attendance
Game	Date	Opponent	Score	Record	Venue	Attendance
A	Sun, July 9	vs. Edmonton Eskimos	W 7–2	1–0	Everett Memorial Stadium*	6,248
B	Mon, July 17	vs. Hamilton Tiger-Cats	W 3–0	2–0	Empire Stadium	17,170
C	Wed, July 26	vs. Ottawa Rough Riders	T 18–18	2–0–1	Empire Stadium	21,147

- Game was played in Everett, Washington.

== Regular season ==
=== Season standings ===
Western Football Conference
Team	GP	W	L	T	PF	PA	Pts
Calgary Stampeders	16	12	4	0	382	219	24
Saskatchewan Roughriders	16	12	4	0	346	282	24
Edmonton Eskimos	16	9	6	1	266	246	19
Winnipeg Blue Bombers	16	4	12	0	212	414	8
BC Lions	16	3	12	1	239	319	7

=== Season schedule ===
Game	Date	Opponent	Results		Venue	Attendance
Game	Date	Opponent	Score	Record	Venue	Attendance
1	Tue, Aug 1	at Calgary Stampeders	L 7–20	0–1	McMahon Stadium	19,436
2	Mon, Aug 7	vs. Saskatchewan Roughriders	L 16–24	0–2	Empire Stadium	28,411
3	Fri, Aug 11	at Saskatchewan Roughriders	L 13–36	0–3	Taylor Field	19,016
4	Wed, Aug 16	vs. Toronto Argonauts	L 17–18	0–4	Empire Stadium	27,142
5	Sun, Aug 27	vs. Calgary Stampeders	L 7–16	0–5	Empire Stadium	28,436
6	Thu, Aug 31	at Winnipeg Blue Bombers	W 22–13	1–5	Winnipeg Stadium	17,058
7	Sat, Sept 9	vs. Edmonton Eskimos	T 14–14	1–5–1	Empire Stadium	28,266
8	Sun, Sept 17	at Edmonton Eskimos	L 8–19	1–6–1	Clarke Stadium	20,000
9	Wed, Sept 27	vs. Winnipeg Blue Bombers	W 17–1	2–6–1	Empire Stadium	25,412
10	Sun, Oct 1	at Winnipeg Blue Bombers	L 8–19	2–7–1	Winnipeg Stadium	13,582
11	Sun, Oct 8	vs. Edmonton Eskimos	L 3–19	2–8–1	Empire Stadium	23,386
12	Sun, Oct 15	at Hamilton Tiger-Cats	L 17–22	2–9–1	Civic Stadium	19,000
13	Wed, Oct 18	at Ottawa Rough Riders	L 16–19	2–10–1	Lansdowne Park	19,302
14	Mon, Oct 23	vs. Montreal Alouettes	W 30–20	3–10–1	Empire Stadium	24,621
15	Sun, Oct 29	at Saskatchewan Roughriders	L 14–24	3–11–1	Taylor Field	13,969
16	Sat, Nov 4	vs. Calgary Stampeders	L 30–35	3–12–1	Empire Stadium	23,706

=== Offensive leaders ===
Player	Passing yds	Rushing yds	Receiving yds	TD
Bernie Faloney	3303	236	0	2
Leroy Sledge		288	911	6
Bill Munsey		656	228	0
Jim Young		21	976	8
Jimmy Sidle		0	432	1
Sonny Homer		0	397	1

== Awards and records ==
=== 1967 CFL All-Stars ===
None
