= 1962 BC Lions season =

Canadian football team season

- General manager: Herb Capozzi
- Head coach: Dave Skrien
- Home stadium: Empire Stadium

Results
- Record: 7–9
- Division place: 4th, West
- Playoffs: did not qualify

Uniform

The 1962 BC Lions finished the season in fourth place in the Western Conference with a 7–9 record and failed to make the playoffs.

Dave Skrien's first full season as head coach saw drastic improvement from the one win team in 1961. Joe Kapp lead the CFL in passing yards (3279), completions (197) and TD passes (17). Bruising fullback Nub Beamer had a terrific season rushing for 1161 yards and duo threat tailback Willie Fleming had 925 yards rushing and 525 yards receiving.

Linebacker Tom Brown was the lone Lion on the CFL All-star team.

The Lions changed their helmets to include the now classic mountain lion claw logo.

== Regular season ==
=== Season standings ===
Western Football Conference
Team	GP	W	L	T	PF	PA	Pts
Winnipeg Blue Bombers	16	11	5	0	385	291	22
Calgary Stampeders	16	9	6	1	352	335	19
Saskatchewan Roughriders	16	8	7	1	268	336	17
BC Lions	16	7	9	0	346	342	14
Edmonton Eskimos	16	6	9	1	310	346	13

=== Season schedule ===
Game	Date	Opponent	Results	
Game	Date	Opponent	Score	Record
1	Aug 9	vs. Saskatchewan Roughriders	W 33–7	1–0
2	Aug 16	vs. Calgary Stampeders	L 20–35	1–1
3	Aug 20	at Calgary Stampeders	W 12–4	2–1
4	Aug 27	vs. Ottawa Rough Riders	L 7–18	2–2
5	Aug 31	at Edmonton Eskimos	L 10–22	2–3
6	Sept 6	at Montreal Alouettes	L 19–21	2–4
7	Sept 9	at Toronto Argonauts	W 37–21	3–4
8	Sept 17	vs. Hamilton Tiger-Cats	L 6–31	3–5
9	Sept 22	at Saskatchewan Roughriders	L 14–26	3–6
10	Sept 24	vs. Winnipeg Blue Bombers	W 27–22	4–6
11	Sept 29	at Edmonton Eskimos	W 46–24	5–6
12	Oct 6	at Winnipeg Blue Bombers	W 18–6	6–6
13	Oct 13	vs. Edmonton Eskimos	L 7–26	6–7
14	Oct 20	at Calgary Stampeders	L 28–36	6–8
15	Oct 27	vs. Winnipeg Blue Bombers	L 34–35	6–9
16	Nov 4	vs. Saskatchewan Roughriders	W 28–8	7–9

=== Offensive leaders ===
Player	Passing yds	Rushing yds	Receiving yds	TD
Joe Kapp	3279	183	0	3
Willie Fleming		925	525	12
Nub Beamer		1161	190	14
Tom Larscheid		597	496	9
Mack Burton		0	818	6
Sonny Homer		0	669	4
Jim Carphin		0	390	2
Pat Claridge		0	263	1

== 1962 CFL awards ==
LB – Tom Brown, CFL All-Star
