= 1963 BC Lions season =

Canadian football team season

- General manager: Herb Capozzi
- Head coach: Dave Skrien
- Home stadium: Empire Stadium

Results
- Record: 12–4
- Division place: 1st, West
- Playoffs: Lost Grey Cup

Uniform
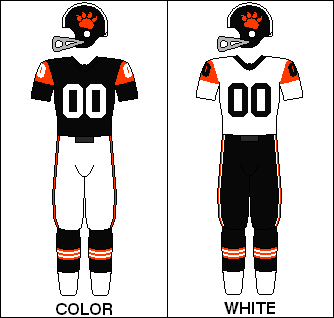

The 1963 BC Lions finished the season in first place in the Western Conference for the first time ever with a 12–4 record.

Over the course of the season, the Lions' defense allowed an average of only 14.5 points per game while running back Willie Fleming rushed for 1,234 yards and an astounding 9.7 yard average. It was first time the Lions finished with a perfect home record. A total of seven Lions would make the CFL all-star team and Tom Brown would win the Schenley for Most Outstanding Lineman.

On September 7, a crowd of 36,659 watch the Lions versus the Calgary Stampeders, the largest crowd ever to watch a CFL regular season game at that point in time.

After claiming first place, the Lions earned a bye into the West Finals where they beat the Saskatchewan Roughriders two games to one. They made their first Grey Cup appearance in franchise history, losing to the Hamilton Tiger-Cats by a score of 21–10 at Empire Stadium.

The Lions changed their jerseys. The orange and black stripes were replaced with thick orange shoulder stripe with TV numbers including within.

== Regular season ==
=== Season standings ===
Western Football Conference
Team	GP	W	L	T	PF	PA	Pts
BC Lions	16	12	4	0	387	232	24
Calgary Stampeders	16	10	4	2	427	323	22
Saskatchewan Roughriders	16	7	7	2	223	226	16
Winnipeg Blue Bombers	16	7	9	0	302	325	14
Edmonton Eskimos	16	2	14	0	220	425	4

=== Season schedule ===
Game	Date	Opponent	Results	
Game	Date	Opponent	Score	Record
1	Aug 8	at Saskatchewan Roughriders	W 16–7	1–0
2	Aug 12	vs. Edmonton Eskimos	W 31–12	2–0
3	Aug 19	vs. Toronto Argonauts	W 22–12	3–0
4	Aug 26	at Calgary Stampeders	W 22–19	4–0
5	Aug 29	at Winnipeg Blue Bombers	L 15–16	4–1
6	Sept 7	vs. Calgary Stampeders	W 37–21	5–1
7	Sept 9	at Saskatchewan Roughriders	W 8–2	6–1
8	Sept 16	vs. Montreal Alouettes	W 20–9	7–1
9	Sept 21	at Hamilton Tiger-Cats	L 21–38	7–2
10	Sept 23	at Ottawa Rough Riders	L 17–23	7–3
11	Sept 30	vs. Calgary Stampeders	W 32–14	8–3
12	Oct 5	at Edmonton Eskimos	W 40–1	9–3
13	Oct 12	vs. Saskatchewan Roughriders	W 26–6	10–3
14	Oct 19	vs. Edmonton Eskimos	W 32–6	11–3
15	Oct 27	at Winnipeg Blue Bombers	L 26–34	11–4
16	Nov 3	vs. Winnipeg Blue Bombers	W 28–10	12–4

== Playoffs ==
=== West Finals ===
Western finals – Game 1
BC Lions @ Saskatchewan Roughriders
Date	Away	Home
November 16	BC Lions 19	Saskatchewan Roughriders 7

Western finals – Game 2
Saskatchewan Roughriders @ BC Lions
Date	Away	Home
November 20	Saskatchewan Roughriders 13	BC Lions 8

Western finals – Game 3
Saskatchewan Roughriders @ BC Lions
Date	Away	Home
November 23	Saskatchewan Roughriders 1	BC Lions 36

- BC wins the best of three series 2–1. The Lions will advance to the Grey Cup Championship game.

=== Grey Cup ===
November 30 51st Annual Grey Cup Game: Empire Stadium – Vancouver, British Columbia
Western Champion	Eastern Champion
BC Lions 10	Hamilton Tiger-Cats 21
The Hamilton Tiger-Cats are the 1963 Grey Cup Champions.

=== Offensive leaders ===
Player	Passing yds	Rushing yds	Receiving yds	TD
Joe Kapp	3011	438	0	5
Willie Fleming		1234	539	12
Nub Beamer		914	128	12
Sonny Homer		0	608	3
Jerry Janes		0	390	3
Pat Claridge		0	377	3
Mack Burton		0	352	3

== Awards and records ==
- CFL's Most Outstanding Lineman Award – Tom Brown (LB)
- CFL's Coach of the Year – Dave Skrien
- Jeff Nicklin Memorial Trophy – Joe Kapp (QB)

=== 1963 CFL All-Stars ===
- QB – Joe Kapp, CFL All-Star
- RB – Willie "The Wisp" Fleming, CFL All-Star
- OG – Tom Hinton, CFL All-Star
- OT – Lonnie Dennis, CFL All-Star
- DE – Dick Fouts, CFL All-Star
- LB – Tom Brown, CFL All-Star
- LB – Norm Fieldgate, CFL All-Star
