= 1966 Toronto Argonauts season =

CFL team season

- Head coach: Bob Shaw
- Home stadium: Exhibition Stadium

Results
- Record: 5–9
- Division place: 4th, East
- Playoffs: did not qualify

The 1966 Toronto Argonauts finished in fourth place in the Eastern Conference with a 5–9 record and failed to make the playoffs.

== Preseason ==
Game	Date	Opponent	Results		Venue	Attendance
Game	Date	Opponent	Score	Record	Venue	Attendance
A	Thu, July 14	vs. Hamilton Tiger-Cats	W 41–27	1–0	Exhibition Stadium	20,000
B	Wed, July 20	vs. Calgary Stampeders	L 13–17	1–1	Exhibition Stadium	23,335
B	Sat, July 23	at Edmonton Eskimos	L 7–9	1–2	Clarke Stadium	7,500
C	Wed, July 27	at BC Lions	W 28–27	2–2	Empire Stadium	23,103

== Regular season ==
=== Standings ===
Eastern Football Conference
Team	GP	W	L	T	PF	PA	Pts
Ottawa Rough Riders	14	11	3	0	278	177	22
Hamilton Tiger-Cats	14	9	5	0	264	160	18
Montreal Alouettes	14	7	7	0	156	215	14
Toronto Argonauts	14	5	9	0	166	271	10

=== Schedule ===
Week	Game	Date	Opponent	Results		Venue	Attendance
Week	Game	Date	Opponent	Score	Record	Venue	Attendance
1	1	Fri, Aug 5	vs. Hamilton Tiger-Cats	L 8–18	0–1	Exhibition Stadium	28,594
2	2	Fri, Aug 12	vs. Montreal Alouettes	L 6–17	0–2	Exhibition Stadium	24,139
3	3	Sat, Aug 20	at Hamilton Tiger-Cats	L 10–23	0–3	Civic Stadium	22,261
4	Bye						
5	4	Tue, Aug 30	at Ottawa Rough Riders	L 0–24	0–4	Landsdowne Park	20,137
5	5	Mon, Sept 5	at Calgary Stampeders	L 8–13	0–5	McMahon Stadium	20,000
6	6	Sun, Sept 11	vs. Edmonton Eskimos	W 34–14	1–5	Exhibition Stadium	21,685
7	7	Sun, Sept 18	at Saskatchewan Roughriders	L 7–23	1–6	Taylor Field	19,339
8	8	Wed, Sept 21	at Winnipeg Blue Bombers	L 9–43	1–7	Winnipeg Stadium	17,112
8	9	Sun, Sept 25	vs. BC Lions	W 29–27	2–7	Exhibition Stadium	18,926
9	10	Mon, Oct 1	vs. Ottawa Rough Riders	L 8–17	2–8	Exhibition Stadium	20,786
10	11	Mon, Oct 10	at Montreal Alouettes	W 9–8	3–8	Molson Stadium	14,000
11	12	Sat, Oct 15	vs. Montreal Alouettes	L 11–27	3–9	Exhibition Stadium	16,000
12	13	Sun, Oct 23	vs. Ottawa Rough Riders	W 35–12	4–9	Exhibition Stadium	16,064
13	14	Sat, Oct 29	at Hamilton Tiger-Cats	W 8–5	5–9	Civic Stadium	15,072
