= Barrie Hansen =

Canadian football player (born 1941)

Profile
- Positions: Halfback, Defensive back, Punt returner

Personal information
- Born: August 11, 1941 (age 85); Winnipeg, Manitoba
- Listed height: 5 ft 10 in (1.78 m)
- Listed weight: 180 lb (82 kg)

Career history
- 1961–1963: Montreal Alouettes
- 1964–1966: Winnipeg Blue Bombers
- 1967–1969: Hamilton Tiger-Cats
- 1970: BC Lions

Awards and highlights
- Grey Cup champion (1967)

Barrie Hansen (born August 11, 1941) was a Canadian professional football defensive back and occasional punt returner who played for the Hamilton Tiger-Cats, Montreal Alouettes, Winnipeg Blue Bombers, and BC Lions.

Hansen played college football at the California State University, Northridge. He joined the Alouettes in 1961 and played 3 years with them. He next played 3 more years with Winnipeg, missing only 3 games. He then played 3 more years with Hamilton from 1967 to 1969, where he won the 1967 Grey Cup. The following year, he reached a peak with 5 interceptions. His final year was at BC.

He died February 5, 2017, in Ventura California.
