= 1967 Hamilton Tiger-Cats season =

Season of Canadian Football League team the Hamilton Tiger-Cats

- Head coach: Ralph Sazio
- Home stadium: Civic Stadium

Results
- Record: 10–4
- Division place: 1st, East
- Playoffs: Won Grey Cup
- Team MOP: Tommy Joe Coffey
- Team MOC: Gene Ceppetelli

Uniform

The 1967 Hamilton Tiger-Cats season was the 10th season for the team in the Canadian Football League (CFL) and their 18th overall. The Tiger-Cats finished in first place in the Eastern Conference with a 10–4 record and won the Grey Cup over the Saskatchewan Roughriders.

== Preseason ==
Week	Date	Opponent	Results		Venue	Attendance
Week	Date	Opponent	Score	Record	Venue	Attendance
A	July 14	at Edmonton Eskimos	L 11–16	0–1		15,000
A	July 17	at BC Lions	L 0–3	0–2		
B	July 26	vs. Winnipeg Blue Bombers	L 8–14	0–3		12,000

== Regular season ==
=== Season standings ===
Eastern Football Conference
Team	GP	W	L	T	PF	PA	Pts
Hamilton Tiger-Cats	14	10	4	0	250	195	20
Ottawa Rough Riders	14	9	4	1	337	209	19
Toronto Argonauts	14	5	8	1	252	266	11
Montreal Alouettes	14	2	12	0	166	302	4

=== Season schedule ===
Week	Game	Date	Opponent	Results		Venue	Attendance
Week	Game	Date	Opponent	Score	Record	Venue	Attendance
1	1	Aug 12	vs. Edmonton Eskimos	L 14–20	0–1		22,435
2	2	Aug 17	at Montreal Alouettes	W 17–16	1–1		27,190
3	3	Aug 23	vs. Ottawa Rough Riders	W 22–17	2–1		25,482
4	4	Sept 4	vs. Toronto Argonauts	W 12–9	3–1		25,357
5	5	Sept 10	at Toronto Argonauts	W 23–15	4–1		24,343
6	6	Sept 17	at Ottawa Rough Riders	W 16–14	5–1		27,058
7	7	Sept 23	vs. Montreal Alouettes	W 19–1	6–1		22,491
8	8	Oct 1	vs. Ottawa Rough Riders	L 8–17	6–2		27,125
9	9	Oct 7	at Calgary Stampeders	L 10–34	6–3		22,096
9	10	Oct 9	at Saskatchewan Roughriders	L 21–22	6–4		21,405
10	11	Oct 15	vs. BC Lions	W 22–17	7–4		19,000
11	12	Oct 22	at Winnipeg Blue Bombers	W 31–4	8–4		13,088
12	13	Oct 29	vs. Montreal Alouettes	W 26–4	9–4		16,127
13	14	Nov 5	at Toronto Argonauts	W 9–5	10–4		24,146

== Playoffs ==
=== Schedule ===
Round	Date	Opponent	Results		Venue	Attendance
Round	Date	Opponent	Score	Record	Venue	Attendance
Eastern Final #1	Nov 19	at Ottawa Rough Riders	W 11–3	1–0		22,287
Eastern Final #2	Nov 25	vs. Ottawa Rough Riders	W 26–0	2–0		21,254
Grey Cup	Dec 2	Saskatchewan Roughriders	W 24–1	3–0		31,358

==== Grey Cup ====
Teams	Q1	Q2	Q3	Q4	Final
Hamilton Tiger-Cats	7	10	0	7	24
Saskatchewan Roughriders	1	0	0	0	1
