= 1962 Toronto Argonauts season =

CFL team season

- Head coach: Lou Agase; Nobby Wirkowski
- Home stadium: Exhibition Stadium

Results
- Record: 4–10
- Division place: 4th, East
- Playoffs: did not qualify

The 1962 Toronto Argonauts finished in fourth place in the Eastern Conference with a 4–10 record and failed to make the playoffs.

== Regular season ==
=== Standings ===
Eastern Football Conference
| Team | GP | W | L | T | PF | PA | Pts |
|---|---|---|---|---|---|---|---|
| Hamilton Tiger-Cats | 14 | 9 | 4 | 1 | 358 | 286 | 19 |
| Ottawa Rough Riders | 14 | 6 | 7 | 1 | 339 | 302 | 13 |
| Montreal Alouettes | 14 | 4 | 7 | 3 | 308 | 309 | 11 |
| Toronto Argonauts | 14 | 4 | 10 | 0 | 259 | 378 | 8 |

=== Schedule ===
| Week | Date | Opponent | Result | Record | Venue | Attendance |
| 1 | Aug 10 | vs. Montreal Alouettes | L 15–28 | 0–1 | Exhibition Stadium | 26,391 |
| 2 | Aug 18 | at Hamilton Tiger-Cats | L 23–29 | 0–2 | Civic Stadium | 25,316 |
| 3 | Aug 23 | at Winnipeg Blue Bombers | L 13–33 | 0–3 | Winnipeg Stadium | 16,700 |
| 4 | Sept 1 | at Ottawa Rough Riders | L 8–26 | 0–4 | Landsdowne Park | 15,799 |
| 5 | Sept 9 | vs. BC Lions | L 21–37 | 0–5 | Exhibition Stadium | 22,254 |
| 6 | Sept 16 | vs. Ottawa Rough Riders | W 16–10 | 1–5 | Exhibition Stadium | 24,721 |
| 7 | Sept 24 | vs. Edmonton Eskimos | L 22–31 | 1–6 | Exhibition Stadium | 24,117 |
| 8 | Sept 29 | at Saskatchewan Roughriders | L 17–21 | 1–7 | Taylor Field | 11,758 |
| 8 | Oct 1 | at Calgary Stampeders | W 38–23 | 2–7 | McMahon Stadium | 16,000 |
| 9 | Oct 6 | vs. Hamilton Tiger-Cats | W 10–9 | 3–7 | Exhibition Stadium | 25,174 |
| 10 | Oct 14 | vs. Montreal Alouettes | L 21–50 | 3–8 | Exhibition Stadium | 29,521 |
| 11 | Oct 21 | at Hamilton Tiger-Cats | L 24–27 | 3–9 | Civic Stadium | 24,591 |
| 12 | Oct 28 | vs. Ottawa Rough Riders | W 23–22 | 4–9 | Exhibition Stadium | 20,862 |
| 13 | Nov 3 | at Montreal Alouettes | L 8–32 | 4–10 | Molson Stadium | 22,933 |
