= 1963 Calgary Stampeders season =

Canadian football team season

- General manager: Jim Finks
- Head coach: Bobby Dobbs
- Home stadium: McMahon Stadium

Results
- Record: 10–4–2
- Division place: 2nd, West
- Playoffs: Lost Western Semi-Finals

The 1963 Calgary Stampeders finished in second place in the Western Conference with a 10–4–2 record. They were defeated in the Western Semi-Finals by the Saskatchewan Roughriders.

== Regular season ==
=== Season standings ===
Western Football Conference
Team	GP	W	L	T	PF	PA	Pts
BC Lions	16	12	4	0	387	232	24
Calgary Stampeders	16	10	4	2	427	323	22
Saskatchewan Roughriders	16	7	7	2	223	226	16
Winnipeg Blue Bombers	16	7	9	0	302	325	14
Edmonton Eskimos	16	2	14	0	220	425	4

=== Season schedule ===
Week	Game	Date	Opponent	Results		Venue	Attendance
Week	Game	Date	Opponent	Score	Record	Venue	Attendance
	1		Winnipeg Blue Bombers	W 36–27	1–0		
	2		Winnipeg Blue Bombers	W 24–8	2–0		
	3		Hamilton Tiger-Cats	W 35–31	3–0		
	4		Saskatchewan Roughriders	W 17–16	4–0		
	5		BC Lions	L 19–22	4–1		
	6		Edmonton Eskimos	W 13–11	5–1		
	7		BC Lions	L 21–37	5–2		
	8		Saskatchewan Roughriders	T 4–4	5–2–1		
	9		Toronto Argonauts	W 50–0	6–2–1		
	10		Montreal Alouettes	L 17–25	6–3–1		
	11		BC Lions	L 14–32	6–4–1		
	12		Ottawa Rough Riders	W 47–17	7–4–1		
	13		Winnipeg Blue Bombers	W 14–8	8–4–1		
	14		Saskatchewan Roughriders	T 33–33	8–4–2		
	15		Edmonton Eskimos	W 45–28	9–4–2		
	16		Edmonton Eskimos	W 38–24	10–4–2		

== Playoffs ==
=== Cenference Semi-Finals ===
Western Semi-Finals – Game 1
Saskatchewan Roughriders @ Calgary Stampeders
Date	Away	Home
November 9	Saskatchewan Roughriders 9	Calgary Stampeders 35

Western Semi-Finals – Game 2
Calgary Stampeders @ Saskatchewan Roughriders
Date	Away	Home
November 11	Calgary Stampeders 12	Saskatchewan Roughriders 39

- Saskatchewan won the total-point series by 48–47. The Roughriders will play the BC Lions in the Western Finals.
