= 1962 Calgary Stampeders season =

Canadian football team season

- General manager: Jim Finks
- Head coach: Bobby Dobbs
- Home stadium: McMahon Stadium

Results
- Record: 9–6–1
- Division place: 2nd, West
- Playoffs: Lost Western Finals

The 1962 Calgary Stampeders finished in second place in the Western Conference with a 9–6–1 record. They were defeated in the Western Finals by the Winnipeg Blue Bombers.

== Regular season ==
=== Season standings ===
Western Football Conference
Team	GP	W	L	T	PF	PA	Pts
Winnipeg Blue Bombers	16	11	5	0	385	291	22
Calgary Stampeders	16	9	6	1	352	335	19
Saskatchewan Roughriders	16	8	7	1	268	336	17
BC Lions	16	7	9	0	346	342	14
Edmonton Eskimos	16	6	9	1	310	346	13

=== Season schedule ===
Week	Game	Date	Opponent	Results		Venue	Attendance
Week	Game	Date	Opponent	Score	Record	Venue	Attendance
	1		Saskatchewan Roughriders	L 6–17	0–1		
	2		Winnipeg Blue Bombers	L 27–45	0–2		
	3		BC Lions	W 35–20	1–2		
	4		BC Lions	L 4–12	1–3		
	5		Saskatchewan Roughriders	T 7–7	1–3–1		
	6		Winnipeg Blue Bombers	L 1–26	1–4–1		
	7		Edmonton Eskimos	W 49–17	2–4–1		
	8		Edmonton Eskimos	W 17–12	3–4–1		
	9		Montreal Alouettes	W 17–7	4–4–1		
	10		Ottawa Rough Riders	W 36–32	5–4–1		
	11		Hamilton Tiger-Cats	W 38–21	6–4–1		
	12		Toronto Argonauts	L 23–38	6–5–1		
	13		Edmonton Eskimos	W 22–15	7–5–1		
	14		Winnipeg Blue Bombers	W 19–15	8–5–1		
	15		BC Lions	W 36–28	9–5–1		
	16		Saskatchewan Roughriders	L 15–23	9–6–1		

== Playoffs ==
=== Cenference Semi-Finals ===
Western Semi-Finals – Game 1
Saskatchewan Roughriders @ Calgary Stampeders
Date	Away	Home
November 10	Saskatchewan Roughriders 0	Calgary Stampeders 25

Western Semi-Finals – Game 2
Calgary Stampeders @ Saskatchewan Roughriders
Date	Away	Home
November 12	Calgary Stampeders 18	Saskatchewan Roughriders 7

- Calgary won the total-point series by 43–7. The Stampeders will play the Winnipeg Blue Bombers in the Western Finals.

=== Conference finals ===
Western-Finals – Game 1
Winnipeg Blue Bombers @ Calgary Stampeders
Date	Away	Home
November 17	Winnipeg Blue Bombers 14	Calgary Stampeders 20

Western Finals – Game 2
Calgary Stampeders @ Winnipeg Blue Bombers
Date	Away	Home
November 21	Calgary Stampeders 11	Winnipeg Blue Bombers 19

Western Finals – Game 3
Calgary Stampeders @ Winnipeg Blue Bombers
Date	Away	Home
November 24	Calgary Stampeders 7	Winnipeg Blue Bombers 12

- Winnipeg wins the best of three series 2–1. The Blue Bombers will advance to the Grey Cup Championship game.

== Awards and records ==
- CFL's Most Outstanding Canadian Award – Harvey Wylie (DB)

=== 1962 CFL All-Stars ===
- QB – Eagle Day, CFL All-Star
- RB – Earl Lunsford, CFL All-Star
- OG – Tony Pajaczkowski, CFL All-Star
- DT – Don Luzzi, CFL All-Star
- LB – Wayne Harris, CFL All-Star
- DB – Harvey Wylie, CFL All-Star
