= 1967 Ottawa Rough Riders season =

Canadian football team season

- Owner: Sam Berger
- General manager: Red O'Quinn
- Head coach: Frank Clair
- Home stadium: Lansdowne Park

Results
- Record: 9–4–1
- Division place: 2nd, East
- Playoffs: Lost Eastern Finals

The 1967 Ottawa Rough Riders finished the season in second place in the Eastern Conference with a 9–4–1 record and lost in the Eastern Finals to the Hamilton Tiger-Cats.

== Preseason ==
Game	Date	Opponent	Results	
Game	Date	Opponent	Score	Record
A	July 17	vs. Calgary Stampeders	L 7–22	0–1
B	July 24	at Calgary Stampeders	L 11–13	0–2
B	July 26	at BC Lions	T 18–18	0–2–1

== Regular season ==
=== Standings ===
Eastern Football Conference
Team	GP	W	L	T	PF	PA	Pts
Hamilton Tiger-Cats	14	10	4	0	250	195	20
Ottawa Rough Riders	14	9	4	1	337	209	19
Toronto Argonauts	14	5	8	1	252	266	11
Montreal Alouettes	14	2	12	0	166	302	4

=== Schedule ===
Game	Date	Opponent	Results	
Game	Date	Opponent	Score	Record
1	Aug 9	vs. Edmonton Eskimos	W 28–25	1–0
2	Aug 16	at Winnipeg Blue Bombers	W 40–7	2–0
3	Aug 23	at Hamilton Tiger-Cats	L 17–22	2–1
4	Sept 4	vs. Montreal Alouettes	W 17–5	3–1
5	Sept 10	at Saskatchewan Roughriders	L 23–32	3–2
5	Sept 12	at Calgary Stampeders	L 13–20	3–3
6	Sept 17	vs. Hamilton Tiger-Cats	L 14–16	3–4
7	Sept 24	vs. Toronto Argonauts	W 38–3	4–4
8	Oct 1	at Hamilton Tiger-Cats	W 17–8	5–4
9	Oct 9	vs. Montreal Alouettes	W 40–6	6–4
10	Bye			
11	Oct 18	vs. BC Lions	W 19–16	7–4
11	Oct 22	at Toronto Argonauts	T 28–28	7–4–1
12	Oct 28	vs. Toronto Argonauts	W 28–18	8–4–1
13	Nov 4	at Montreal Alouettes	W 15–1	9–4–1

== Postseason ==
Game	Date	Opponent	Results	
Game	Date	Opponent	Score	Record
East Semi-Final	Nov 12	vs. Toronto Argonauts	W 38–22	10–4–1
East Final #1	Nov 19	vs. Hamilton Tiger-Cats	L 3–11	10–5–1
East Final #2	Nov 25	at Hamilton Tiger-Cats	L 0–26	10–6–1

=== Awards and honours ===
- Bo Scott, Running back, CFL All-Star
- Whit Tucker, Receiver, CFL All-Star
- Roger Perdrix, Guard, CFL All-Star
- Gene Gaines, Defensive back, CFL All-Star
