= Martinello =

Martinello is an Italian surname. Notable people with the surname include:

- Marty Martinello (1931–2022), Canadian football player
- Medo Martinello (born 1935), Canadian lacrosse player and coach
- Silvio Martinello (born 1963), Italian cyclist
