= Farrell Funston =

American gridiron football player (1936–1996)

No. 71
- Position: Wide receiver

Personal information
- Born: March 5, 1936 (age 90); Los Angeles, California, U.S.
- Died: July 20, 1996
- Listed height: 6 ft 2 in (1.88 m)
- Listed weight: 208 lb (94 kg)

Career information
- College: Pacific
- NFL draft: 1958: 11th round

Career history
- 1959–1966: Winnipeg Blue Bombers

Awards and highlights
- 3× Grey Cup champion (1959, 1961, 1962); 2× CFL West All-Star (1961, 1963)

Farrell Funston (March 5, 1936 – July 20, 1996) was a Canadian Football League (CFL) wide receiver for the Winnipeg Blue Bombers for eight years. He won three Grey Cup titles with the team.

== CFL career ==
After playing college football at Pacific University and being drafted by the National Football League without playing a down, Funston became a wide receiver for the Winnipeg Blue Bombers from 1959 to 1966. For all those years, Ken Ploen was his quarterback. Together, they were major factors in Winnipeg's four Grey Cup appearances (1959, 1961, 1962, 1965), including three victories: 1959, 1961, 1962, and one loss: 1965. His highest totals as a receiver were the two years he was voted as a western conference all-star: 1961 (47 catches for 892 yards, 19.0 yards per catch, 8 touchdowns) and 1963 (60 catches for 835 yards, 13.9 yards per catch, 9 touchdowns).

== See also ==
- List of Grey Cup champions
- List of people from Los Angeles
