= 1964 Calgary Stampeders season =

Canadian football team season

- General manager: Jim Finks; Pat Mahoney
- Head coach: Bobby Dobbs
- Home stadium: McMahon Stadium

Results
- Record: 12–4
- Division place: 2nd, West
- Playoffs: Lost Western Finals

The 1964 Calgary Stampeders finished in second place in the Western Conference with a 12–4 record. They were defeated in the Western Finals by the BC Lions.

== Regular season ==
=== Season standings ===
Western Football Conference
Team	GP	W	L	T	PF	PA	Pts
BC Lions	16	11	2	3	328	168	25
Calgary Stampeders	16	12	4	0	352	349	24
Saskatchewan Roughriders	16	9	7	0	330	282	18
Edmonton Eskimos	16	4	12	0	222	458	8
Winnipeg Blue Bombers	16	1	14	1	270	397	3

=== Season schedule ===
Week	Game	Date	Opponent	Results		Venue	Attendance
Week	Game	Date	Opponent	Score	Record	Venue	Attendance
	1		Saskatchewan Roughriders	L 4–15	0–1		
	2		Edmonton Eskimos	W 52–15	1–1		
	3		BC Lions	L 4–22	1–2		
	4		Saskatchewan Roughriders	W 14–13	2–2		
	5		Edmonton Eskimos	W 39–6	3–2		
	6		Winnipeg Blue Bombers	W 13–10	4–2		
	7		Winnipeg Blue Bombers	W 25–8	5–2		
	8		Ottawa Rough Riders	L 12–52	5–3		
	9		Hamilton Tiger-Cats	W 20–18	6–3		
	10		BC Lions	L 7–12	6–4		
	11		Toronto Argonauts	W 30–25	7–4		
	12		Winnipeg Blue Bombers	W 24–16	8–4		
	13		Montreal Alouettes	W 23–7	9–4		
	14		Saskatchewan Roughriders	W 42–0	10–4		
	15		Edmonton Eskimos	W 17–16	11–4		
	16		BC Lions	W 26–14	12–4		

== Playoffs ==
=== Cenference Semi-Finals ===
Western Semi-Finals – Game 1
Calgary Stampeders @ Saskatchewan Roughriders
Date	Away	Home
November 7	Calgary Stampeders 25	Saskatchewan Roughriders 34

Western Semi-Finals – Game 2
Saskatchewan Roughriders @ Calgary Stampeders
Date	Away	Home
November 9	Saskatchewan Roughriders 6	Calgary Stampeders 51

- Calgary won the total-point series by 76–40. The Stampeders will play the BC Lions in the Western Finals.

=== Conference finals ===
Western-Finals – Game 1
BC Lions @ Calgary Stampeders
Date	Away	Home
November 14	BC Lions 24	Calgary Stampeders 10

Western Finals – Game 2
Calgary Stampeders @ BC Lions
Date	Away	Home
November 18	Calgary Stampeders 14	BC Lions 10

Western Finals – Game 3
Calgary Stampeders @ BC Lions
Date	Away	Home
November 22	Calgary Stampeders 14	BC Lions 33

- BC wins the best of three series 2–1. The Lions will advance to the Grey Cup Championship game.
