= 1961 Toronto Argonauts season =

CFL team season

- Head coach: Lou Agase
- Home stadium: Exhibition Stadium

Results
- Record: 7–6–1
- Division place: 3rd, East
- Playoffs: Lost Eastern Finals

The 1961 Toronto Argonauts finished in third place in the Eastern Conference with a 7–6–1 record. They appeared in the Eastern Finals.

== Preseason ==
The Argonauts hosted the NFL's St. Louis Cardinals at CNE Stadium on August 2 in the third of three interleague games hosted in Toronto and lost 36–7.

| Game | Date | Opponent | Results | | Venue | Attendance |
| Game | Date | Opponent | Score | Record | Venue | Attendance |
|---|---|---|---|---|---|---|
| A | Thu, July 20 | vs. BC Lions | W 28–17 | 1–0 | Exhibition Stadium | 22,150 |
| B | Tue, July 25 | at Calgary Stampeders | W 28–17 | 2–0 | McMahon Stadium | 11,000 |
| B | Thu, July 27 | at Winnipeg Blue Bombers | L 18–20 | 2–1 | Winnipeg Stadium | 19,660 |
| C | Wed, Aug 2 | vs. St. Louis Cardinals (NFL) | L 7–36 | 2–2 | Exhibition Stadium | 24,376 |

== Regular season ==
=== Standings ===
Eastern Football Conference
| Team | GP | W | L | T | PF | PA | Pts |
|---|---|---|---|---|---|---|---|
| Hamilton Tiger-Cats | 14 | 10 | 4 | 0 | 340 | 293 | 20 |
| Ottawa Rough Riders | 14 | 8 | 6 | 0 | 359 | 285 | 16 |
| Toronto Argonauts | 14 | 7 | 6 | 1 | 255 | 258 | 15 |
| Montreal Alouettes | 14 | 4 | 9 | 1 | 213 | 225 | 9 |

=== Schedule ===
| Week | Game | Date | Opponent | Results | | Venue | Attendance |
| Week | Game | Date | Opponent | Score | Record | Venue | Attendance |
|---|---|---|---|---|---|---|---|
| 1 | 1 | Aug 14 | vs. Winnipeg Blue Bombers | L 13–14 | 0–1 | Exhibition Stadium | 27,189 |
| 2 | 2 | Aug 20 | vs. Hamilton Tiger-Cats | L 24–28 | 0–2 | Exhibition Stadium | 27,809 |
| 3 | 3 | Aug 25 | at Montreal Alouettes | W 15–10 | 1–2 | Molson Stadium | 18,522 |
| 4 | 4 | Sept 4 | at Hamilton Tiger-Cats | L 19–21 | 1–3 | Civic Stadium | 26,533 |
| 5 | 5 | Sept 10 | vs. Saskatchewan Roughriders | W 27–7 | 2–3 | Exhibition Stadium | 24,047 |
| 6 | 6 | Sept 16 | at Edmonton Eskimos | T 8–8 | 2–3–1 | Clarke Stadium | 21,510 |
| 6 | 7 | Sept 18 | at BC Lions | W 15–7 | 3–3–1 | Empire Stadium | 24,428 |
| 7 | 8 | Sept 24 | vs. Ottawa Rough Riders | L 10–29 | 3–4–1 | Exhibition Stadium | 30,648 |
| 8 | 9 | Sept 29 | vs. Calgary Stampeders | W 22–19 | 4–4–1 | Exhibition Stadium | 23,546 |
| 9 | 10 | Oct 7 | at Montreal Alouettes | W 33–27 | 5–4–1 | Molson Stadium | 19,075 |
| 10 | 11 | Oct 15 | vs. Hamilton Tiger-Cats | L 10–37 | 5–5–1 | Exhibition Stadium | 29,553 |
| 11 | 12 | Oct 21 | at Ottawa Rough Riders | W 21–7 | 6–5–1 | Lansdowne Park | 18,821 |
| 12 | 13 | Oct 29 | vs. Montreal Alouettes | W 15–9 | 7–5–1 | Exhibition Stadium | 23,316 |
| 13 | 14 | Nov 4 | at Ottawa Rough Riders | L 23–35 | 7–6–1 | Lansdowne Park | 17,144 |

== Postseason ==
| Round | Date | Opponent | Results | | Venue | Attendance |
| Round | Date | Opponent | Score | Record | Venue | Attendance |
|---|---|---|---|---|---|---|
| East Semi-Final | Nov 11 | at Ottawa Rough Riders | W 43–19 | 1–0 | Lansdowne Park | 19,151 |
| East Final Game 1 | Nov 19 | vs. Hamilton Tiger-Cats | W 25–7 | 2–0 | Exhibition Stadium | 33,135 |
| East Final Game 2 | Nov 25 | at Hamilton Tiger-Cats | L 2–48 (OT) | 2–1 | Civic Stadium | 22,671 |

== Awards and honours ==
- None
