= 1969 Hamilton Tiger-Cats season =

Season of Canadian Football League team the Hamilton Tiger-Cats

- Head coach: Joe Restic
- Home stadium: Civic Stadium

Results
- Record: 8–5–1
- Division place: 3rd, East
- Playoffs: Lost Eastern Semi-Final
- Team MOP: Tommy Joe Coffey
- Team MOC: Bill Danychuk

The 1969 Hamilton Tiger-Cats season was the 12th season for the team in the Canadian Football League (CFL) and their 20th overall. The Tiger-Cats finished in third place in the Eastern Conference with an 8–5–1 record, but lost the Eastern Semi-Final to the Toronto Argonauts.

== Regular season ==
=== Season standings ===
Eastern Football Conference
Team	GP	W	L	T	PF	PA	Pts
Ottawa Rough Riders	14	11	3	0	399	298	22
Toronto Argonauts	14	10	4	0	406	280	20
Hamilton Tiger-Cats	14	8	5	1	307	315	17
Montreal Alouettes	14	2	10	2	304	395	6

=== Season schedule ===
Week	Game	Date	Opponent	Results		Venue	Attendance
Week	Game	Date	Opponent	Score	Record	Venue	Attendance
1	1	July 31	at Toronto Argonauts	W 34–28	1–0		
2	2	Aug 9	vs. Montreal Alouettes	T 22–22	1–0–1		
3	3	Aug 16	vs. BC Lions	W 25–0	2–0–1		
4	4	Aug 25	at Calgary Stampeders	W 27–26	3–0–1		
5	5	Sept 1	vs. Ottawa Rough Riders	W 27–22	4–0–1		
6	Bye						
7	6	Sept 10	at Winnipeg Blue Bombers	W 17–7	5–0–1		
7	7	Sept 14	at Saskatchewan Roughriders	W 31–29	6–0–1		
8	8	Sept 21	vs. Montreal Alouettes	L 35–41	6–1–1		
9	Bye						
10	9	Sept 30	vs. Edmonton Eskimos	W 17–12	7–1–1		
10	10	Oct 4	at Ottawa Rough Riders	L 20–28	7–2–1		
11	11	Oct 13	vs. Toronto Argonauts	L 7–17	7–3–1		
12	12	Oct 19	at Toronto Argonauts	L 8–51	7–4–1		
13	13	Oct 26	at Montreal Alouettes	L 9–25	7–5–1		
14	14	Nov 1	vs. Ottawa Rough Riders	W 28–7	8–5–1		

== Post-season ==
Round	Date	Opponent	Results		Venue	Attendance
Round	Date	Opponent	Score	Record	Venue	Attendance
Eastern Semi-Final	Nov 9	at Toronto Argonauts	L 9–15	0–1		

== Awards and honours ==
- Garney Henley, CFL All-Star
- Ellison Kelly, CFL All-Star
