= 1966 Saskatchewan Roughriders season =

CFL team season

- General manager: Ken Preston
- Head coach: Eagle Keys
- Home stadium: Taylor Field

Results
- Record: 9–6–1
- Division place: 1st, West
- Playoffs: Won Grey Cup

Uniform

The 1966 Saskatchewan Roughriders season was the 57th in franchise history. Following a first-place finish in the regular season, the Roughriders won 29–14 their first Grey Cup over the Ottawa Rough Riders. It was Saskatchewan's first championship in franchise history.

== Preseason ==
Game	Date	Opponent	Results		Venue	Attendance
Game	Date	Opponent	Score	Record	Venue	Attendance
A	Tue, July 12	at Montreal Alouettes	W 23–17	1–0	McGill Stadium	18,000
A	Thur, July 14	at Ottawa Rough Riders	L 10–19	1–1	Lansdowne Park	14,000
B	Fri, July 22	vs. Montreal Alouettes	W 20–1	2–1	Taylor Field	

== Regular season ==
=== Season standings ===
Western Football Conference
Team	GP	W	L	T	PF	PA	Pts
Saskatchewan Roughriders	16	9	6	1	351	318	19
Winnipeg Blue Bombers	16	8	7	1	264	230	17
Edmonton Eskimos	16	6	9	1	251	328	13
Calgary Stampeders	16	6	9	1	227	459	13
BC Lions	16	5	11	0	254	269	10

=== Schedule ===
Week	Game	Date	Opponent	Results		Venue	Attendance
Week	Game	Date	Opponent	Score	Record	Venue	Attendance
1	1	Fri, July 29	at Edmonton Eskimos	W 40–13	1–0	Clarke Stadium	16,400
2	2	Sun, Aug 7	vs. Winnipeg Blue Bombers	W 38–14	2–0	Taylor Field	20,009
3	3	Fri, Aug 12	vs. BC Lions	W 16–14	3–0	Taylor Field	20,379
4	4	Wed, Aug 17	at Calgary Stampeders	L 1–26	3–1	McMahon Stadium	22,119
4	5	Mon, Aug 22	vs. Edmonton Eskimos	L 17–18	3–2	Taylor Field	18,052
5	6	Sun, Aug 28	at BC Lions	W 30–29	4–2	Empire Stadium	31,560
6	7	Mon, Sept 5	vs. Montreal Alouettes	W 44–0	5–2	Taylor Field	19,451
7	8	Sun, Sept 11	at Winnipeg Blue Bombers	W 27–24	6–2	Winnipeg Stadium	21,655
8	9	Sun, Sept 18	vs. Toronto Argonauts	W 23–7	7–2	Taylor Field	19,339
9	10	Sat, Sept 24	at Hamilton Tiger-Cats	L 7–29	7–3	Civic Stadium	26,057
9	11	Mon, Sept 26	at Ottawa Rough Riders	L 8–18	7–4	Lansdowne Park	22,954
10	12	Sun, Oct 2	vs. Winnipeg Blue Bombers	T 11–11	7–4–1	Taylor Field	19,045
11	13	Sat, Oct 8	vs. Calgary Stampeders	L 18–35	7–5–1	Taylor Field	16,392
12	14	Sat, Oct 15	at BC Lions	W 22–21	8–5–1	Empire Stadium	34,163
13	15	Sat, Oct 22	vs. Edmonton Eskimos	L 21–33	8–6–1	Taylor Field	18,000
14	16	Tue, Oct 25	at Calgary Stampeders	W 28–26	9–6–1	McMahon Stadium	18,435

- † denotes that the week, date and score of this game is unknown.

== Postseason ==
=== Schedule ===
Round	Date	Opponent	Results		Venue	Attendance
Round	Date	Opponent	Score	Record	Venue	Attendance
West Final 1	Sun, Nov 13	vs. Winnipeg Blue Bombers	W 14–7	1–0	Taylor Field	14,013
West Final 2	Wed, Nov 16	at Winnipeg Blue Bombers	W 21–19	2–0	Winnipeg Stadium	13,624
54th Grey Cup	Sat, Nov 26	at Ottawa Rough Riders	W 29–14	3–0	Lansdowne Park	36,553

=== Grey Cup ===
Teams	1 Q	2 Q	3 Q	4 Q	Final
Saskatchewan Roughriders	7	7	0	15	29
Ottawa Rough Riders	6	8	0	0	14

== Awards and honours ==
- Grey Cup's Most Valuable Player, George Reed
- George Reed, CFL All-Star, Offense
- Hugh Campbell, CFL All-Star, Offense
