= Dick Johnson (gridiron football) =

American football player (born 1939)

No. 70, 85
- Position: End

Personal information
- Born: 1939 (age 86–87); United States
- Listed height: 6 ft 4 in (1.93 m)
- Listed weight: 220 lb (100 kg)

Career information
- High school: Red Wing (Red Wing, Minnesota)
- College: Minnesota (1957–1959)
- NFL draft: 1960: undrafted

Career history
- BC Lions (1960–1961); New York Titans (1962)*; Kansas City Chiefs (1963)
- * Offseason or practice squad member only
- Stats at Pro Football Reference

Richard John Johnson (born 1939) is an American former professional football end who played for the Kansas City Chiefs of the American Football League (AFL). He played college football for the Minnesota Golden Gophers and skipped his senior year to sign with the BC Lions of the Canadian Football League (CFL).

== Early life ==
Richard John Johnson was born on 1939 in the United States. He attended Red Wing High School in Red Wing, Minnesota.

== College career ==
Johnson enrolled at the University of Minnesota to play college football for the Golden Gophers. He was on the freshman team in 1957 and was a two-year varsity letterman from 1958 to 1959. He played in all 18 games for the Golden Gophers from 1958 to 1959, catching six passes for 218 yards and two touchdowns.

== Professional career ==
In March 1960, Johnson signed with the BC Lions of the Canadian Football League (CFL), forgoing his final year of college eligibility. He played in six games for the Lions during the 1960 CFL season, recording one reception for 18 yards on offense and one interception for four yards on defense. He missed the second half of the season due to a knee injury. Johnson dressed in 15 games for BC in 1961, totaling 33 catches for 645 yards and four touchdowns, four kickoff returns for 64 yards, and two fumble recoveries. He led the team in all three receiving categories. The Lions finished the 1961 season with a 1–13–2 record. He was released on August 1, 1962, before the start of the regular season. The Vancouver Sun noted that after being cut, Johnson went into the Lions' dressing room and "quietly said his goodbyes to his former teammates. Most of it was done in an embarrassed silence."

Johnson was signed by the New York Titans of the American Football League (AFL) on August 6, 1962. However, he was later released.

Johnson signed with the AFL's Kansas City Chiefs in 1963. He was waived on September 3, 1963. He was later re-signed by Kansas City and played in five games during the 1963 season in a reserve role, catching two passes for 17 yards and one touchdown.
