= 1961 Hamilton Tiger-Cats season =

Season of Canadian Football League team, the Hamilton Tiger-Cats

- General manager: Jake Gaudaur
- Head coach: Ralph Sazio
- Home stadium: Civic Stadium

Results
- Record: 10–4
- Division place: 1st, East
- Playoffs: Lost in Grey Cup Final

The 1961 Hamilton Tiger-Cats season was the fourth season for the team in the Canadian Football League (CFL) and their 12th overall. The team finished in first place in the Eastern Football Conference with a 10–4 record and faced the Winnipeg Blue Bombers in the Grey Cup for the fourth time in the last five seasons. The Tiger-Cats lost the 49th Grey Cup game by a score of 21–14 and was the first Grey Cup game to be decided in overtime.

Notably, this was the first season to introduce a regular season interlocking schedule with the Western Interprovincial Football Union teams. The Tiger-Cats had a 5–0 record in these games and therefore won the first regular season meeting against each of the CFL's Western teams. The club also played an exhibition game against the American Football League's Buffalo Bills where the Tiger-Cats won 38–21. It was the first meeting between a CFL team and an AFL team and it was the only time a CFL team had defeated a team from the present day's National Football League. This was also the last time that a CFL team played an NFL or an AFL team.

== Exhibition ==
Week	Date	Opponent	Results		Venue	Attendance
Week	Date	Opponent	Score	Record	Venue	Attendance
A	Bye					
B	Fri, July 21	at Edmonton Eskimos	L 9–17	0–1		10,000
B	Mon, July 24	at BC Lions	L 27–38	0–2		18,769
C	Mon, July 31	at Montreal Alouettes	W 25–16	1–2		17,635
D	Tues, Aug 8	vs. Buffalo Bills (AFL)	W 38–21	2–2		12,000

== Regular season ==
=== Season standings ===
Eastern Football Conference
Team	GP	W	L	T	PF	PA	Pts
Hamilton Tiger-Cats	14	10	4	0	340	293	20
Ottawa Rough Riders	14	8	6	0	359	285	16
Toronto Argonauts	14	7	6	1	255	258	15
Montreal Alouettes	14	4	9	1	213	225	9

=== Season schedule ===
Week	Game	Date	Opponent	Results		Venue	Attendance
Week	Game	Date	Opponent	Score	Record	Venue	Attendance
1	Bye						
2	1	Tues, Aug 15	vs. BC Lions	W 30–21	1–0		17,103
3	2	Sun, Aug 20	at Toronto Argonauts	W 28–24	2–0		27,809
4	Bye						
5	3	Thurs, Aug 31	at Winnipeg Blue Bombers	W 30–9	3–0		18,951
5	4	Mon, Sept 4	vs. Toronto Argonauts	W 21–19	4–0		26,533
6	5	Mon, Sept 11	vs. Edmonton Eskimos	W 32–15	5–0		27,646
7	6	Sat, Sept 16	at Calgary Stampeders	W 37–36	6–0		16,707
7	7	Mon, Sept 18	at Saskatchewan Roughriders	W 22–15	7–0		10,152
8	8	Sat, Sept 23	vs. Montreal Alouettes	L 7–28	7–1		25,291
9	9	Sat, Sept 30	at Ottawa Rough Riders	L 21–47	7–2		22,400
10	10	Mon, Oct 9	vs. Ottawa Rough Riders	L 10–14	7–3		25,273
11	11	Sun, Oct 15	at Toronto Argonauts	W 37–10	8–3		29,553
12	12	Sat, Oct 21	vs. Montreal Alouettes	W 15–5	9–3		22,723
13	13	Sat, Oct 28	vs. Ottawa Rough Riders	W 44–29	10–3		20,271
14	14	Sat, Nov 4	at Montreal Alouettes	L 6–21	10–4		16,199

== Post-season ==
=== Schedule ===
Round	Date	Opponent	Results		Venue	Attendance
Round	Date	Opponent	Score	Record	Venue	Attendance
Eastern Semi-Final	Bye					
Eastern Final #1	Sat, Nov 18	at Toronto Argonauts	L 7–25	0–1		33,161
Eastern Final #2	Sat, Nov 25	vs. Toronto Argonauts	W 48–2	1–1		22,671
Grey Cup	Sat, Dec 2	Winnipeg Blue Bombers	L 14–21 (OT)	1–2		32,651
