= 1961 Winnipeg Blue Bombers season =

Canadian football team season

- General manager: Jim Ausley
- President: Gordon Lawson
- Head coach: Bud Grant
- Home stadium: Winnipeg Stadium

Results
- Record: 13–3
- Division place: 1st, West
- Playoffs: Won Grey Cup

The 1961 Winnipeg Blue Bombers finished in first place in the Western Conference with a 13–3 record. Winnipeg met the Hamilton Tiger-Cats in the 49th Grey Cup.and played in what has been called one of the greatest Cups ever played, as Winnipeg rallied to send the game to overtime late to make it the first Grey Cup to be decided in overtime (and the only one for the entire 20th century). Ken Ploen gave the Blue Bombers the win with his 19-yard scramble to the endzone to end it in double overtime.

== Preseason ==
Week	Date	Opponent	Result	Record
A	July 20	at Ottawa Rough Riders	L 15–28	0–1
B	July 27	vs. Toronto Argonauts	W 20–18	1–1

== Regular season ==
=== Standings ===
Western Football Conference
Team	GP	W	L	T	PF	PA	Pts
Winnipeg Blue Bombers	16	13	3	0	360	251	26
Edmonton Eskimos	16	10	5	1	334	257	21
Calgary Stampeders	16	7	9	0	300	311	14
Saskatchewan Roughriders	16	5	10	1	211	314	11
BC Lions	16	1	13	2	215	393	4

=== Schedule ===
Week	Game	Date	Opponent	Result	Record
1	1	Aug 7	at Calgary Stampeders	W 18–17	1–0
2	2	Aug 11	at Montreal Alouettes	W 21–15	2–0
2	3	Aug 14	at Toronto Argonauts	W 14–13	3–0
3	4	Aug 17	vs. Ottawa Rough Riders	W 29–19	4–0
4	5	Aug 24	vs. Edmonton Eskimos	L 20–35	4–1
5	6	Aug 31	vs. Hamilton Tiger-Cats	L 9–30	4–2
5	7	Sept 4	at Saskatchewan Roughriders	W 17–11	5–2
6	Bye				
7	8	Sept 14	vs. BC Lions	W 36–15	6–2
8	9	Sept 23	at Edmonton Eskimos	W 33–10	7–2
9	10	Sept 30	vs. Saskatchewan Roughriders	W 29–6	8–2
10	11	Oct 7	vs. BC Lions	W 24–20	9–2
11	12	Oct 14	at Calgary Stampeders	W 25–6	10–2
11	13	Oct 16	at BC Lions	W 16–15	11–2
12	14	Oct 23	vs. Calgary Stampeders	W 42–7	12–2
12	15	Oct 30	vs. Saskatchewan Roughriders	L 13–19	12–3
13	16	Nov 4	at Edmonton Eskimos	W 14–13	13–3

== Playoffs ==
Round	Date	Opponent	Result	Record
West Final #1	Nov 18	at Calgary Stampeders	W 14–1	1–0
West Final #2	Nov 22	vs. Calgary Stampeders	W 43–14	2–0
49th Grey Cup	Dec 2	vs. Hamilton Tiger-Cats	W 21–14 (OT)	3–0

=== Grey Cup ===
Team	Q1	Q2	Q3	Q4	OT	Total
Winnipeg Blue Bombers	7	0	7	0	7	21
Hamilton Tiger-Cats	0	7	0	7	0	14
