= 1966 BC Lions season =

Canadian football team season

- General manager: Herb Capozzi
- Head coach: Dave Skrien
- Home stadium: Empire Stadium

Results
- Record: 5–11
- Division place: 5th, West
- Playoffs: did not qualify

Uniform
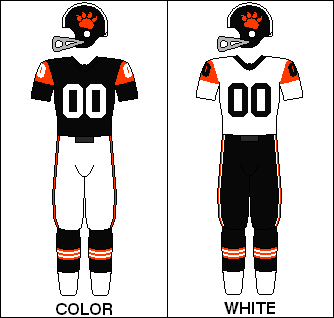

The 1966 BC Lions finished in fifth place in the Western Conference with a 5–11 record continuing to regress as their star players were in the twilights of their careers.

The Lions lost many close games, including five by one or two points. Placekicker Bill Mitchell kicked a woeful 11 for 25 field goal attempts.

After the season, Joe Kapp was traded to the Minnesota Vikings of the NFL and in return the Lions got a young Canadian receiver, Jim Young. A number of former stars retired, including standouts Willie Fleming and Tom Hinton.

The first gooseneck or slingshot field goal post was installed at Empire Stadium for the 1966 Grey Cup game.

== Regular season ==
=== Season standings ===
Western Football Conference
Team	GP	W	L	T	PF	PA	Pts
Saskatchewan Roughriders	16	9	6	1	351	318	19
Winnipeg Blue Bombers	16	8	7	1	264	230	17
Edmonton Eskimos	16	6	9	1	251	328	13
Calgary Stampeders	16	6	9	1	227	459	13
BC Lions	16	5	11	0	254	269	10

=== Season schedule ===
Game	Date	Opponent	Results	
Game	Date	Opponent	Score	Record
1	Aug 3	at Calgary Stampeders	W 21–3	1–0
2	Aug 8	vs. Edmonton Eskimos	L 7–27	1–1
3	Aug 12	at Saskatchewan Roughriders	L 14–16	1–2
4	Aug 18	vs. Winnipeg Blue Bombers	L 7–11	1–3
5	Aug 28	vs. Saskatchewan Roughriders	L 29–30	1–4
6	Sept 2	at Edmonton Eskimos	L 6–13	1–5
7	Sept 10	vs. Calgary Stampeders	W 14–3	2–5
8	Sept 17	vs. Ottawa Rough Riders	L 16–21	2–6
9	Sept 25	at Toronto Argonauts	L 27–29	2–7
10	Sept 27	at Montreal Alouettes	L 23–25	2–8
11	Oct 3	vs. Hamilton Tiger-Cats	W 17–10	3–8
12	Oct 10	at Edmonton Eskimos	W 10–7	4–8
13	Oct 15	vs. Saskatchewan Roughriders	L 21–22	4–9
14	Oct 17	at Calgary Stampeders	W 13–9	5–9
15	Oct 23	at Winnipeg Blue Bombers	L 7–16	5–10
16	Oct 30	vs. Winnipeg Blue Bombers	L 13–27	5–11

=== Offensive leaders ===
Player	Passing yds	Rushing yds	Receiving yds	TD
Joe Kapp	2889	341	0	2
Bill Munsey		853	256	7
Larry Eilmes		756	247	7
Willie Fleming		260	653	8
Dave Moton		15	552	2
Sonny Homer		0	549	2
Pat Claridge		0	399	1

== Awards and records ==
=== 1966 CFL All-Stars ===
None
