= 1962 Winnipeg Blue Bombers season =

Canadian football team season

- General manager: Jim Ausley
- Head coach: Bud Grant
- Home stadium: Winnipeg Stadium

Results
- Record: 11–5
- Division place: 1st, West
- Playoffs: Won Grey Cup

The 1962 Winnipeg Blue Bombers finished in first place in the Western Conference with an 11–5 record. In a rematch of the previous season's Grey Cup Final, the Blue Bombers defeated the Hamilton Tiger-Cats to win the 50th Grey Cup. The win cemented the Bombers' status as a dynasty, having won four Grey Cups in five years.

== Preseason ==
Week	Date	Opponent	Result	Record
A	July 23	vs. Ottawa Rough Riders	W 15–14	1–0
B	July 26	at Montreal Alouettes	L 0–53	1–1
C	Aug 1	at Toronto Argonauts	W 17–14	2–1

== Regular season ==
=== Standings ===
Western Football Conference
Team	GP	W	L	T	PF	PA	Pts
Winnipeg Blue Bombers	16	11	5	0	385	291	22
Calgary Stampeders	16	9	6	1	352	335	19
Saskatchewan Roughriders	16	8	7	1	268	336	17
BC Lions	16	7	9	0	346	342	14
Edmonton Eskimos	16	6	9	1	310	346	13

=== Schedule ===
Week	Game	Date	Opponent	Score	Record
1	1	Aug 9	vs. Edmonton Eskimos	L 16–20	0–1
2	2	Aug 13	at Calgary Stampeders	W 45–27	1–1
3	3	Aug 23	at Toronto Argonauts	W 33–13	2–1
4	4	Aug 30	vs. Calgary Stampeders	W 26–1	3–1
5	5	Sept 3	at Saskatchewan Roughriders	W 30–7	4–1
5	6	Sept 7	at Ottawa Rough Riders	W 31–28	5–1
6	7	Sept 10	at Hamilton Tiger-Cats	W 16–10	6–1
7	8	Sept 17	vs. Saskatchewan Roughriders	W 20–18	7–1
8	9	Sept 24	at BC Lions	L 22–27	7–2
8	10	Sept 27	vs. Montreal Alouettes	W 31–23	8–2
9	11	Oct 6	vs. BC Lions	L 6–18	8–3
10	12	Oct 13	vs. Calgary Stampeders	L 15–19	8–4
11	13	Oct 20	at Edmonton Eskimos	W 30–20	9–4
12	14	Oct 22	at Saskatchewan Roughriders	W 17–8	10–4
12	15	Oct 27	at BC Lions	W 35–24	11–4
13	16	Nov 3	vs. Edmonton Eskimos	L 12–18	11–5

== Playoffs ==
Game	Date	Opponent	Score	Result
West Final #1	Nov 17	at Calgary Stampeders	L 14–20	0–1
West Final #2	Nov 21	vs. Calgary Stampeders	W 19–11	1–1
West Final #3	Nov 24	vs. Calgary Stampeders	W 12–7	2–1
46th Grey Cup	Dec 1	Hamilton Tiger-Cats	W 28–27	3–1

=== Grey Cup ===
Team	Q1	Q2	Q3	Q4	Total
Winnipeg Blue Bombers	7	7	7	7	28
Hamilton Tiger-Cats	7	6	14	0	27
