= 1961 Calgary Stampeders season =

Canadian football team season

- General manager: Jim Finks
- Head coach: Bobby Dobbs
- Home stadium: McMahon Stadium

Results
- Record: 7–9
- Division place: 3rd, West
- Playoffs: Lost Western Finals

The 1961 Calgary Stampeders finished in third place in the Western Conference of the Canadian Football League (CFL) with a 7–9 record. They were defeated in the Western Finals by the Winnipeg Blue Bombers.

== Regular season ==
=== Season standings ===
Western Football Conference
Team	GP	W	L	T	PF	PA	Pts
Winnipeg Blue Bombers	16	13	3	0	360	251	26
Edmonton Eskimos	16	10	5	1	334	257	21
Calgary Stampeders	16	7	9	0	300	311	14
Saskatchewan Roughriders	16	5	10	1	211	314	11
BC Lions	16	1	13	2	215	393	4

=== Season schedule ===
Week	Game	Date	Opponent	Results		Venue	Attendance
Week	Game	Date	Opponent	Score	Record	Venue	Attendance
	1		Winnipeg Blue Bombers	L 17–18	0–1		
	2		Saskatchewan Roughriders	W 20–10	1–1		
	3		Saskatchewan Roughriders	L 15–22	1–2		
	4		Ottawa Rough Riders	L 1–32	1–3		
	5		Edmonton Eskimos	L 9–10	1–4		
	6		BC Lions	W 35–17	2–4		
	7		Hamilton Tiger-Cats	L 36–37	2–5		
	8		BC Lions	W 28–9	3–5		
	9		Toronto Argonauts	L 19–22	3–6		
	10		Montreal Alouettes	W 6–2	4–6		
	11		Edmonton Eskimos	W 28–21	5–6		
	12		Winnipeg Blue Bombers	L 6–25	5–7		
	13		Saskatchewan Roughriders	W 22–17	6–7		
	14		Winnipeg Blue Bombers	L 7–42	6–8		
	15		Edmonton Eskimos	L 8–20	6–9		
	16		BC Lions	W 43–7	7–9		

== Playoffs ==
=== Cenference Semi-Finals ===
Western Semi-Finals – Game 1
Edmonton Eskimos @ Calgary Stampeders
Date	Away	Home
November 11	Edmonton Eskimos 8	Calgary Stampeders 10

Western Semi-Finals – Game 2
Calgary Stampeders @ Edmonton Eskimos
Date	Away	Home
November 13	Calgary Stampeders 17	Edmonton Eskimos 18

- Calgary won the total-point series by 27–26. The Stampeders will play the Winnipeg Blue Bombers in the Western Finals.

=== Conference finals ===
Western Finals – Game 1
Winnipeg Blue Bombers @ Calgary Stampeders
Date	Away	Home
November 18	Winnipeg Blue Bombers 14	Calgary Stampeders 1

Western Finals – Game 2
Calgary Stampeders @ Winnipeg Blue Bombers
Date	Away	Home
November 22	Calgary Stampeders 14	Winnipeg Blue Bombers 43

- Winnipeg wins the best of three series 2–0. The Blue Bombers will advance to the Grey Cup Championship game.

== Awards and records ==
- CFL's Most Outstanding Canadian Award – Tony Pajaczkowski (DE)
