= 1969 Toronto Argonauts season =

CFL team season

- Head coach: Leo Cahill
- Home stadium: Exhibition Stadium

Results
- Record: 10–4
- Division place: 2nd, East
- Playoffs: Lost Eastern Finals

The 1969 Toronto Argonauts finished in second place in the Eastern Conference with a 10–4 record. They appeared in the Eastern Finals.

== Regular season ==
=== Standings ===
Eastern Football Conference
Team	GP	W	L	T	PF	PA	Pts
Ottawa Rough Riders	14	11	3	0	399	298	22
Toronto Argonauts	14	10	4	0	406	280	20
Hamilton Tiger-Cats	14	8	5	1	307	315	17
Montreal Alouettes	14	2	10	2	304	395	6

=== Schedule ===
Week	Game	Date	Opponent	Results		Venue	Attendance
Week	Game	Date	Opponent	Score	Record	Venue	Attendance
1	1	Thu, July 31	vs. Hamilton Tiger-Cats	L 28–34	0–1	Exhibition Stadium	33,135
2	2	Tue, Aug 5	at Montreal Alouettes	W 33–26	1–1	Autostade	9,500
3	3	Thu, Aug 14	vs. Winnipeg Blue Bombers	W 29–3	2–1	Exhibition Stadium	32,021
4	4	Sat, Aug 23	at BC Lions	W 42–20	3–1	Empire Stadium	27,661
5	5	Wed, Aug 27	at Edmonton Eskimos	W 24–12	4–1	Clarke Stadium	20,850
6	6	Sun, Sept 7	vs. Saskatchewan Roughriders	W 34–15	5–1	Exhibition Stadium	33,135
7	7	Sat, Sept 13	at Ottawa Rough Riders	L 23–25	5–2	Landsdowne Park	26,989
8	8	Sat, Sept 20	vs. Ottawa Rough Riders	L 27–34	5–3	Exhibition Stadium	33,135
9	9	Sun, Sept 28	at Montreal Alouettes	W 36–33	6–3	Autostade	14,057
10	Bye						
11	10	Wed, Oct 8	vs. Calgary Stampeders	W 31–25	7–3	Exhibition Stadium	33,135
11	11	Mon, Oct 13	at Hamilton Tiger-Cats	W 17–7	8–3	Civic Stadium	30,314
12	12	Sun, Oct 19	vs. Hamilton Tiger-Cats	W 51–8	9–3	Exhibition Stadium	33,135
13	13	Sat, Oct 25	at Ottawa Rough Riders	L 9–20	9–4	Landsdowne Park	27,115
14	14	Sun, Nov 2	vs. Montreal Alouettes	W 22–18	10–4	Exhibition Stadium	28,916

== Postseason ==
Round	Date	Opponent	Results		Venue	Attendance
Round	Date	Opponent	Score	Record	Venue	Attendance
East Semi-Final	November 9	vs. Hamilton Tiger-Cats	W 15–9	1–0	Exhibition Stadium	33,135
East Final Game 1	November 16	vs. Ottawa Rough Riders	W 22–14	2–0	Exhibition Stadium	33,135
East Final Game 2	November 22	at Ottawa Rough Riders	L 3–23	2–1	Landsdowne Park	24,354
