= 1966 Calgary Stampeders season =

Canadian football team season

- General manager: Rogers Lehew
- Head coach: Jerry Williams
- Home stadium: McMahon Stadium

Results
- Record: 6–9–1
- Division place: 4th, West
- Playoffs: did not qualify

The 1966 Calgary Stampeders finished in fourth place in the Western Conference with a 6–9–1 record and did not qualify for the playoffs.

== Regular season ==
=== Season standings ===
Western Football Conference
Team	GP	W	L	T	PF	PA	Pts
Saskatchewan Roughriders	16	9	6	1	351	318	19
Winnipeg Blue Bombers	16	8	7	1	264	230	17
Edmonton Eskimos	16	6	9	1	251	328	13
Calgary Stampeders	16	6	9	1	227	459	13
BC Lions	16	5	11	0	254	269	10

=== Season schedule ===
Week	Game	Date	Opponent	Results		Venue	Attendance
Week	Game	Date	Opponent	Score	Record	Venue	Attendance
	1		BC Lions	L 3–21	0–1		
	2		Ottawa Rough Riders	L 6–13	0–2		
	3		Hamilton Tiger-Cats	L 3–21	0–3		
	4		Saskatchewan Roughriders	W 26–1	1–3		
	5		Winnipeg Blue Bombers	L 6–19	1–4		
	6		Edmonton Eskimos	L 5–26	1–5		
	7		Toronto Argonauts	W 13–8	2–5		
	8		BC Lions	L 3–14	2–6		
	9		Winnipeg Blue Bombers	W 11–8	3–6		
	10		Edmonton Eskimos	T 18–18	3–6–1		
	11		Winnipeg Blue Bombers	W 16–9	4–6–1		
	12		Montreal Alouettes	L 15–26	4–7–1		
	13		Saskatchewan Roughriders	W 35–18	5–7–1		
	14		BC Lions	L 9–13	5–8–1		
	15		Saskatchewan Roughriders	L 16–28	5–9–1		
	16		Edmonton Eskimos	W 29–16	6–9–1		
