= 1961 CFL season =

Canadian Football League season

- Duration: June – October, 1961
- East champions: Hamilton Tiger-Cats
- West champions: Winnipeg Blue Bombers

49th Grey Cup
- Date: December 2, 1961
- Venue: Exhibition Stadium, Toronto
- Champions: Winnipeg Blue Bombers

CFL seasons
- 1960 1962

Canadian Football League team locations: West, East

The 1961 CFL season is considered to be the eighth season in modern-day Canadian football, although it is officially the fourth Canadian Football League season.

The season was notable for being the first in which all CFL teams played each other during the regular season. In the previous three seasons the Eastern and Western sections, despite being formally unified in a single "League," they had maintained separate regular season schedules and playoff schedules.

== CFL news in 1961 ==
The Western Canada Intercollegiate Rugby Union merged with the Canadian Intercollegiate Athletic Union.

The WIFU changed its name to become the Western Football Conference.

The CFL season schedule was partially interlocked to allow teams of the Eastern Football Conference to play regular season games against the teams of the Western Football Conference. Beginning this season, teams played opponents in their own conference three times and opponents in the other conference once, meaning the length of the regular season remained unchanged in both conferences (i.e. sixteen games for Western teams and fourteen games for Eastern teams). The format remained as such until 1974 when the Eastern Conference extended its schedule to sixteen games.

A third consecutive year of interleague exhibition matches were scheduled with teams in the National Football League. As in 1959 and 1960, both CFL teams lost, with the Toronto Argonauts falling to the St. Louis Cardinals, 36–7, on August 2, and the Montreal Alouettes losing to the Chicago Bears, 34–16, on August 5). The Hamilton Tiger-Cats had a better idea for success: challenge the nascent American Football League to a duel. The Tiger-Cats faced off against their cross-border "rivals", the Buffalo Bills, on August 8. The Tiger-Cats defeated the Bills, 38–21, giving the Canadian league its first win over an American team since 1941. The AFL, embarrassed over the loss, declined to play another international game, and with the CFL consistently losing to NFL teams, the CFL ended international competition.

The 49th edition of the Grey Cup went to overtime for the first time at Toronto's CNE Stadium. The Winnipeg Blue Bombers won championship over the Hamilton Tiger-Cats, 21–14.

The CFL made rule changes for the 1962 season, permitting four defensive backs per team to have unlimited blocking during rushing plays, as long as they are lined up outside the ends. Additionally the tackle-eligible play became illegal.

== Regular season standings ==
West Division
Pos	Team	Pld	W	L	T	PF	PA	PD	Pts
1	Winnipeg Blue Bombers (C, Q)	16	13	3	0	360	251	+109	26
2	Edmonton Eskimos (Q)	16	10	5	1	334	257	+77	21
3	Calgary Stampeders (Q)	16	7	9	0	300	311	−11	14
4	Saskatchewan Roughriders	16	5	10	1	211	314	−103	11
5	BC Lions	16	1	13	2	215	393	−178	4

(C) First round bye; (Q) Qualified for playoffs

East Division
Pos	Team	Pld	W	L	T	PF	PA	PD	Pts
1	Hamilton Tiger-Cats (C, Q)	14	10	4	0	340	293	+47	20
2	Ottawa Rough Riders (Q)	14	8	6	0	359	285	+74	16
3	Toronto Argonauts (Q)	14	7	6	1	255	258	−3	15
4	Montreal Alouettes	14	4	9	1	213	225	−12	9

(C) First round bye; (Q) Qualified for playoffs

Winnipeg and Hamilton have first round byes.

== Grey Cup playoffs ==
Note: All dates in 1961

=== Conference Semi-Finals ===
Western Semi-Finals
Edmonton Eskimos vs Calgary Stampeders
Game	Date	Away	Home
1	November 11	Edmonton Eskimos 8	Calgary Stampeders 10
2	November 13	Calgary Stampeders 17	Edmonton Eskimos 18
Calgary won the total-point series by 27–26

Eastern Semi-Finals
Toronto Argonauts @ Ottawa Rough Riders
Date	Away	Home
November 11	Toronto Argonauts 43	Ottawa Rough Riders 19

=== Conference Finals ===
Western Finals
Winnipeg Blue Bombers vs Calgary Stampeders
Game	Date	Away	Home
1	November 18	Winnipeg Blue Bombers 14	Calgary Stampeders 1
2	November 22	Calgary Stampeders 14	Winnipeg Blue Bombers 43
Winnipeg wins the best of three series 2–0

Eastern Finals
Hamilton Tiger-Cats vs Toronto Argonauts
Game	Date	Away	Home
1	November 18	Hamilton Tiger-Cats 7	Toronto Argonauts 25
2 (OT)	November 25	Toronto Argonauts 2	Hamilton Tiger-Cats 48
Hamilton won total-point series by 55–27

== Playoff bracket ==
Division Semifinals
East
E2	Ottawa Rough Riders	19
E3	Toronto Argonauts	43
West
W2	Edmonton Eskimos	26 (8+18)
W3	Calgary Stampeders	27 (10+17)

Division Finals
E1	Hamilton Tiger-Cats	55 (7+48)
E3	Toronto Argonauts	27 (25+2)
W1	Winnipeg Blue Bombers	2 (14,43)
W3	Calgary Stampeders	0 (1,14)

49th Grey Cup
E1	Hamilton Tiger-Cats	14
W1	Winnipeg Blue Bombers	21 (OT)

=== Grey Cup Championship ===
December 2 49th Annual Grey Cup Game: Exhibition Stadium – Toronto
Western Champion	Eastern Champion
Winnipeg Blue Bombers 21 (OT)	Hamilton Tiger-Cats 14
The Winnipeg Blue Bombers are the 1961 Grey Cup Champions
Ken Ploen (QB), Winnipeg Blue Bombers – Grey Cup's Most Valuable Player.

The 1961 Grey Cup was the first CFL championship game to be decided in overtime. The 2005, 2016, and 2021 Grey Cups were also decided in overtime. It also marked the fourth time in five years that the championship was decided between the Blue Bombers and Tiger-Cats.

== CFL leaders ==
- CFL passing leaders
- CFL rushing leaders
- CFL receiving leaders

== 1961 Eastern All-Stars ==
=== Offence ===
- QB – Bernie Faloney, Hamilton Tiger-Cats
- RB – Dick Shatto, Toronto Argonauts
- RB – Don Clark, Montreal Alouettes
- RB – Ron Stewart, Ottawa Rough Riders
- E – Marv Luster, Montreal Alouettes
- E – Paul Dekker, Hamilton Tiger-Cats
- F – Dave Mann, Toronto Argonauts
- C – Norm Stoneburgh, Toronto Argonauts
- OG – Ellison Kelly, Hamilton Tiger-Cats
- OG – Kaye Vaughan, Ottawa Rough Riders
- OT – Milt Crain, Montreal Alouettes
- OT – Tom Jones, Ottawa Rough Riders

=== Defence ===
- DT – Bobby Jack Oliver, Montreal Alouettes
- DT – John Barrow, Hamilton Tiger-Cats
- DE – Billy Ray Locklin, Montreal Alouettes
- DE – Pete Neumann, Hamilton Tiger-Cats
- DG – Marty Martinello, Toronto Argonauts
- LB – Hardiman Cureton, Hamilton Tiger-Cats
- LB – Jim Andreotti, Toronto Argonauts
- LB – Ron Brewer, Montreal Alouettes
- LB – Gerald Nesbitt, Ottawa Rough Riders
- DB – Don Sutherin, Hamilton Tiger-Cats
- DB – George Brancato, Ottawa Rough Riders
- S – Jim Rountree, Toronto Argonauts

== 1961 Western All-Stars ==
=== Offence ===
- QB – Jackie Parker, Edmonton Eskimos
- RB – Willie Fleming, British Columbia Lions
- RB – Earl Lunsford, Calgary Stampeders
- RB – Leo Lewis, Winnipeg Blue Bombers
- RB – Johnny Bright, Edmonton Eskimos
- E – Jack Gotta, Saskatchewan Roughriders
- E – Farrell Funston, Winnipeg Blue Bombers
- C – Neil Habig, Saskatchewan Roughriders
- OG – Cornel Piper, Winnipeg Blue Bombers
- OG – Mike Kmech, Edmonton Eskimos
- OT – Frank Rigney, Winnipeg Blue Bombers
- OT – Don Luzzi, Calgary Stampeders

=== Defence ===
- DT – Mike Wright, Winnipeg Blue Bombers
- DT – Bill Clarke, Saskatchewan Roughriders
- DE – Tony Pajaczkowski, Calgary Stampeders
- DE – Herb Gray, Winnipeg Blue Bombers
- MG – Ron Atchison, Saskatchewan Roughriders
- LB – Gord Rowland, Winnipeg Blue Bombers
- LB – Bob Ptacek, Saskatchewan Roughriders
- LB – Wayne Harris, Calgary Stampeders
- LB – Dave Burkholder, Winnipeg Blue Bombers
- DB – Oscar Kruger, Edmonton Eskimos
- DB – Norm Rauhaus, Winnipeg Blue Bombers
- S – Harvey Wylie, Calgary Stampeders

== 1961 CFL awards ==
- CFL's Most Outstanding Player Award – Bernie Faloney (QB), Hamilton Tiger-Cats
- CFL's Most Outstanding Canadian Award – Tony Pajaczkowski (DE), Calgary Stampeders
- CFL's Most Outstanding Lineman Award – Frank Rigney (OT), Winnipeg Blue Bombers
- CFL's Coach of the Year – Jim Trimble, Hamilton Tiger-Cats
- Jeff Russel Memorial Trophy (Eastern MVP) – Bobby Jack Oliver (DT), Montreal Alouettes
- Jeff Nicklin Memorial Trophy (Western MVP) – Jackie Parker (QB), Edmonton Eskimos
- Gruen Trophy (Eastern Rookie of the Year) – Gino Berretta (OE/P), Montreal Alouettes
- Dr. Beattie Martin Trophy (Western Rookie of the Year) – Larry Robinson (DB), Calgary Stampeders
- DeMarco–Becket Memorial Trophy (Western Outstanding Lineman) – Frank Rigney (OT), Winnipeg Blue Bombers
