= 1969 BC Lions season =

Canadian football team season

- General manager: Denny Veitch
- Head coach: Jim Champion; Jackie Parker
- Home stadium: Empire Stadium

Results
- Record: 5–11
- Division place: 3rd, West
- Playoffs: Lost Western Semi-Final

Uniform

The 1969 BC Lions finished in third place in the Western Conference with a 5–11 record and made the playoffs due to a late season 4 game winning streak.

After taking the club to a 1–9 record, head coach Jim Champion was relieved of his duties, and on September 24, assistant coach Jackie Parker was promoted to head coach. Parker led the club to a 4–2 finish and an unlikely playoff berth. They appeared in the Western Semi-Final, losing to the Calgary Stampeders 35–21.

The offense continued to struggle and managed to score only 22 touchdowns. Jake Scott, MVP of Super Bowl VII, played as a wide receiver. Bruising fullback Jim Evenson had another 1200+ yard season, but again fell second in the rushing race to Saskatchewan's George Reed.

== Offseason ==
=== CFL draft ===
| Round | Pick | Player | Position | School |

== Preseason ==
| Game | Date | Opponent | Results | | Venue | Attendance |
| Game | Date | Opponent | Score | Record | Venue | Attendance |

== Regular season ==
=== Season standings ===
Western Football Conference
| Team | GP | W | L | T | PF | PA | Pts |
|---|---|---|---|---|---|---|---|
| Saskatchewan Roughriders | 16 | 13 | 3 | 0 | 392 | 261 | 26 |
| Calgary Stampeders | 16 | 9 | 7 | 0 | 327 | 314 | 18 |
| BC Lions | 16 | 5 | 11 | 0 | 235 | 335 | 10 |
| Edmonton Eskimos | 16 | 5 | 11 | 0 | 241 | 246 | 10 |
| Winnipeg Blue Bombers | 16 | 3 | 12 | 1 | 192 | 359 | 7 |

=== Season schedule ===
| Game | Date | Opponent | Results | | Venue | Attendance |
| Game | Date | Opponent | Score | Record | Venue | Attendance |
|---|---|---|---|---|---|---|
| 1 | July 30 | vs. Calgary Stampeders | L 7–32 | 0–1 | Empire Stadium | |
| 2 | Aug 3 | at Saskatchewan Roughriders | L 20–22 | 0–2 | Taylor Field | |
| 3 | Aug 13 | at Ottawa Rough Riders | L 24–41 | 0–3 | Lansdowne Park | |
| 4 | Aug 16 | at Hamilton Tiger-Cats | L 0–25 | 0–4 | Civic Stadium | |
| 5 | Aug 23 | vs. Toronto Argonauts | L 20–42 | 0–5 | Empire Stadium | |
| 6 | Sept 1 | at Saskatchewan Roughriders | L 14–32 | 0–6 | Taylor Field | |
| 7 | Sept 6 | vs. Winnipeg Blue Bombers | W 11–7 | 1–6 | Empire Stadium | |
| 8 | Sept 13 | at Calgary Stampeders | L 20–28 | 1–7 | McMahon Stadium | |
| 9 | Sept 17 | vs. Edmonton Eskimos | L 5–13 | 1–8 | Empire Stadium | |
| 10 | Sept 21 | at Winnipeg Blue Bombers | L 17–19 | 1–9 | Winnipeg Stadium | |
| 11 | Sept 27 | vs. Calgary Stampeders | L 17–22 | 1–10 | Empire Stadium | |
| 12 | Oct 5 | at Edmonton Eskimos | W 13–5 | 2–10 | Clarke Stadium | |
| 13 | Oct 11 | vs. Montreal Alouettes | W 21–12 | 3–10 | Empire Stadium | |
| 14 | Oct 18 | vs. Edmonton Eskimos | W 17–14 | 4–10 | Empire Stadium | |
| 15 | Oct 26 | at Winnipeg Blue Bombers | W 22–3 | 5–10 | Winnipeg Stadium | |
| 16 | Oct 30 | vs. Saskatchewan Roughriders | L 7–18 | 5–11 | Empire Stadium | |

=== Offensive leaders ===
| Player | Passing yds | Rushing yds | Receiving yds | TD |
| Paul Brothers | 2671 | 139 | 5 | 1 |
| Jim Evenson | | 1287 | 167 | 5 |
| Bob Brown | | 448 | 52 | 1 |
| Jim Young | | 82 | 773 | 7 |
| Jake Scott | | 11 | 596 | 3 |
| Lefty Hendrickson | | 0 | 387 | 1 |

== Awards and records ==
=== 1969 CFL All-Stars ===
None
