= 1964 Toronto Argonauts season =

CFL team season

- Head coach: Nobby Wirkowski
- Home stadium: Exhibition Stadium

Results
- Record: 4–10
- Division place: 4th, East
- Playoffs: did not qualify

The 1964 Toronto Argonauts finished in fourth place in the Eastern Conference with a 4–10 record and failed to make the playoffs.

== Regular season ==
=== Standings ===
Eastern Football Conference
Team	GP	W	L	T	PF	PA	Pts
Hamilton Tiger-Cats	14	10	3	1	329	201	21
Ottawa Rough Riders	14	8	5	1	313	228	17
Montreal Alouettes	14	6	8	0	192	264	12
Toronto Argonauts	14	4	10	0	243	332	8

=== Schedule ===
Week	Date	Opponent	Result	Record	Venue	Attendance
1	Aug 7	vs. Ottawa Rough Riders	W 23–21	1–0	Exhibition Stadium	29,479
2	Aug 15	vs. Montreal Alouettes	L 13–21	1–1	Exhibition Stadium	30,769
3	Aug 20	at Montreal Alouettes	L 1–16	1–2	Molson Stadium	22,436
4	Sept 1	at Ottawa Rough Riders	L 21–23	1–3	Landsdowne Park	20,221
5	Sept 7	at Hamilton Tiger-Cats	L 8–24	1–4	Civic Stadium	27,156
6	Sept 13	Edmonton Eskimos	W 35–22	2–4	Exhibition Stadium	21,797
7	Sept 20	vs. Hamilton Tiger-Cats	L 14–27	2–5	Exhibition Stadium	27,447
8	Sept 27	at Winnipeg Blue Bombers	W 36–24	3–5	Winnipeg Stadium	14,342
8	Sept 29	at Calgary Stampeders	L 25–30	3–6	McMahon Stadium	15,000
9	Oct 3	vs. BC Lions	L 15–20	3–7	Exhibition Stadium	27,249
10	Oct 12	at Saskatchewan Roughriders	L 14–31	3–8	Taylor Field	16,048
11	Oct 18	vs. Montreal Alouettes	W 31–10	4–8	Exhibition Stadium	21,597
12	Oct 24	at Hamilton Tiger-Cats	L 7–27	4–9	Civic Stadium	20,007
13	Oct 31	vs. Ottawa Rough Riders	L 0–36	4–10	Exhibition Stadium	17,701
