= 1967 Toronto Argonauts season =

CFL team season

- Head coach: Leo Cahill
- Home stadium: Exhibition Stadium

Results
- Record: 5–8–1
- Division place: 3rd, East
- Playoffs: Lost Eastern Semi-Final

The 1967 Toronto Argonauts finished in third place in the Eastern Conference with a 5–8–1 record. They appeared in the Eastern Semi-Final.

== Preseason ==
Game	Date	Opponent	Results		Venue	Attendance
Game	Date	Opponent	Score	Record	Venue	Attendance
A	Mon, July 17	at Winnipeg Blue Bombers	W 42–20	1–0	Winnipeg Stadium	15,500
B	Fri, July 21	vs. Edmonton Eskimos	W 26–7	2–0	Exhibition Stadium	20,260
C	Fri, July 28	vs. Saskatchewan Roughriders	L 24–26	2–1	Exhibition Stadium	24,156
D	Thu, Aug 3	at Montreal Alouettes	W 26–22	3–1	McGill Stadium	15,000

== Regular season ==
=== Standings ===
Eastern Football Conference
Team	GP	W	L	T	PF	PA	Pts
Hamilton Tiger-Cats	14	10	4	0	250	195	20
Ottawa Rough Riders	14	9	4	1	337	209	19
Toronto Argonauts	14	5	8	1	252	266	11
Montreal Alouettes	14	2	12	0	166	302	4

=== Schedule ===
Week	Game	Date	Opponent	Results		Venue	Attendance
Week	Game	Date	Opponent	Score	Record	Venue	Attendance
1	1	Fri, Aug 11	vs. Montreal Alouettes	W 14–7	1–0	Exhibition Stadium	29,698
2	2	Wed, Aug 16	at BC Lions	W 18–17	2–0	Empire Stadium	27,142
2	3	Sat, Aug 19	at Edmonton Eskimos	L 10–31	2–1	Clarke Stadium	21,107
3	4	Sat, Aug 26	at Montreal Alouettes	L 22–34	2–2	Molson Stadium	15,000
4	5	Mon, Sept 4	at Hamilton Tiger-Cats	L 9–12	2–3	Civic Stadium	25,357
5	6	Sun, Sept 10	vs. Hamilton Tiger-Cats	L 15–23	2–4	Exhibition Stadium	24,343
6	Bye						
7	7	Wed, Sept 20	vs. Calgary Stampeders	W 22–13	3–4	Exhibition Stadium	22,092
7	8	Sun, Sept 24	at Ottawa Rough Riders	L 3–38	3–5	Landsdowne Park	21,031
8	9	Sat, Sept 30	vs. Saskatchewan Roughriders	L 15–17	3–6	Exhibition Stadium	21,271
9	10	Sun, Oct 8	vs. Winnipeg Blue Bombers	W 53–0	4–6	Exhibition Stadium	18,575
10	11	Sat, Oct 14	at Montreal Alouettes	W 20–9	5–6	Molson Stadium	10,000
11	12	Sun, Oct 22	vs. Ottawa Rough Riders	T 28–28	5–6–1	Exhibition Stadium	27,238
12	13	Sat, Oct 28	at Ottawa Rough Riders	L 18–28	5–7–1	Landsdowne Park	21,358
13	14	Sun, Nov 5	vs. Hamilton Tiger-Cats	L 5–9	5–8–1	Exhibition Stadium	24,146

== Postseason ==
Round	Date	Opponent	Results		Venue	Attendance
Round	Date	Opponent	Score	Record	Venue	Attendance
East Semi-Final	Sun, Nov 12	at Ottawa Rough Riders	L 22–38	0–1	Landsdowne Park	20,627
