= Mike Kmech =

Canadian football player (1934–2022)

Profile
- Positions: Guard, Tackle

Personal information
- Born: November 21, 1934; Lamont, Alberta, Canada
- Died: February 23, 2022 (aged 87); Edmonton, Alberta, Canada
- Listed height: 5 ft 11 in (1.80 m)
- Listed weight: 205 lb (93 kg)

Career history
- 1956–1963: Edmonton Eskimos

Awards and highlights
- Grey Cup champion (1956)

Michael Kmech (November 21, 1934 – February 23, 2022) was a Canadian professional football player who played for the Edmonton Eskimos. He won the Grey Cup with the Eskimos in 1956. He was born in Lamont, Alberta. Kmech died in Edmonton, Alberta on February 23, 2022, at the age of 87.
