= 1963 Toronto Argonauts season =

CFL team season

- Head coach: Nobby Wirkowski
- Home stadium: Exhibition Stadium

Results
- Record: 3–11
- Division place: 4th, East
- Playoffs: did not qualify

The 1963 Toronto Argonauts finished in fourth place in the Eastern Conference with a 3–11 record and failed to make the playoffs.

== Regular season ==
=== Standings ===
Eastern Football Conference
| Team | GP | W | L | T | PF | PA | Pts |
|---|---|---|---|---|---|---|---|
| Hamilton Tiger-Cats | 14 | 10 | 4 | 0 | 312 | 214 | 20 |
| Ottawa Rough Riders | 14 | 9 | 5 | 0 | 326 | 284 | 18 |
| Montreal Alouettes | 14 | 6 | 8 | 0 | 277 | 297 | 12 |
| Toronto Argonauts | 14 | 3 | 11 | 0 | 202 | 310 | 6 |

=== Schedule ===
| Week | Date | Opponent | Result | Record | Venue | Attendance |
| 1 | Aug 9 | vs. Ottawa Rough Riders | W 8–5 | 1–0 | Exhibition Stadium | 27,557 |
| 2 | Aug 16 | at Edmonton Eskimos | L 16–17 | 1–1 | Clarke Stadium | 18,000 |
| 2 | Aug 19 | at BC Lions | L 14–22 | 1–2 | Empire Stadium | 31,589 |
| 3 | Aug 23 | at Montreal Alouettes | L 8–15 | 1–3 | Molson Stadium | 19,354 |
| 4 | Sept 2 | at Hamilton Tiger-Cats | L 1–7 | 1–4 | Civic Stadium | 26,318 |
| 5 | Sept 6 | vs. Winnipeg Blue Bombers | L 20–25 | 1–5 | Exhibition Stadium | 29,902 |
| 6 | Sept 15 | vs. Hamilton Tiger-Cats | W 15–7 | 2–5 | Exhibition Stadium | 30,752 |
| 7 | Sept 22 | vs. Calgary Stampeders | L 0–50 | 2–6 | Exhibition Stadium | 31,214 |
| 8 | Sept 28 | at Ottawa Rough Riders | L 12–30 | 2–7 | Landsdowne Park | 18,022 |
| 9 | Oct 4 | vs. Montreal Alouettes | L 13–29 | 2–8 | Exhibition Stadium | 23,587 |
| 10 | Oct 13 | at Montreal Alouettes | L 20–34 | 2–9 | Molson Stadium | 23,277 |
| 11 | Oct 20 | vs. Hamilton Tiger-Cats | L 10–11 | 2–10 | Exhibition Stadium | 21,196 |
| 12 | Oct 27 | vs. Saskatchewan Roughriders | W 44–28 | 3–10 | Exhibition Stadium | 19,263 |
| 13 | Nov 2 | at Ottawa Rough Riders | L 21–30 | 3–11 | Landsdowne Park | 13,089 |
