= Gene Ceppetelli =

Canadian gridiron football player (1942–2018)

Profile
- Position: Center

Personal information
- Born: July 28, 1942; Sudbury, Ontario, Canada
- Died: June 14, 2018 (aged 75); Springfield, Pennsylvania, U.S.
- Listed height: 6 ft 2 in (1.88 m)
- Listed weight: 245 lb (111 kg)

Career information
- College: Villanova

Career history
- 1963–1967: Hamilton Tiger-Cats
- 1968–1969: Philadelphia Eagles
- 1969: New York Giants
- 1970–1971: Montreal Alouettes

Awards and highlights
- 4× Grey Cup champion (1963, 1965, 1967, 1970); 2× CFL East All-Star (1967, 1970)
- Stats at Pro Football Reference

Eugene C. Ceppetelli (July 28, 1942 – June 14, 2018) was a Canadian football center in the National Football League (NFL) for the Philadelphia Eagles and New York Giants. He also played seven seasons in the Canadian Football League (CFL) for the Hamilton Tiger-Cats and Montreal Alouettes. He played college football at Villanova University.
