= 1969 Calgary Stampeders season =

Canadian football team season

- General manager: Rogers Lehew
- Head coach: Jim Duncan
- Home stadium: McMahon Stadium

Results
- Record: 9–7
- Division place: 2nd, West
- Playoffs: Lost Western Final

The 1969 Calgary Stampeders finished in second place in the Western Conference with a 9–7 record. They appeared in the Western Semi-Final where they lost to the Saskatchewan Roughriders.

== Regular season ==
=== Season standings ===
Western Football Conference
Team	GP	W	L	T	PF	PA	Pts
Saskatchewan Roughriders	16	13	3	0	392	261	26
Calgary Stampeders	16	9	7	0	327	314	18
BC Lions	16	5	11	0	235	335	10
Edmonton Eskimos	16	5	11	0	241	246	10
Winnipeg Blue Bombers	16	3	12	1	192	359	7

=== Season schedule ===
Week	Game	Date	Opponent	Results		Venue	Attendance
Week	Game	Date	Opponent	Score	Record	Venue	Attendance
	1		BC Lions	W 32–7	1–0		
	2		Ottawa Rough Riders	L 19–35	1–1		
	3		Saskatchewan Roughriders	L 8–24	1–2		
	4		Winnipeg Blue Bombers	W 17–10	2–2		
	5		Hamilton Tiger-Cats	L 26–27	2–3		
	6		Edmonton Eskimos	W 16–14	3–3		
	7		Edmonton Eskimos	W 20–10	4–3		
	8		BC Lions	W 28–20	5–3		
	9		Saskatchewan Roughriders	L 12–31	5–4		
	10		BC Lions	W 22–17	6–4		
	11		Montreal Alouettes	W 35–29	7–4		
	12		Toronto Argonauts	L 25–31	7–5		
	13		Winnipeg Blue Bombers	W 16–15	8–5		
	14		Saskatchewan Roughriders	L 18–24	8–6		
	15		Edmonton Eskimos	L 1–11	8–7		
	16		Winnipeg Blue Bombers	W 32–9	9–7		

== Playoffs ==
=== West Semi-Final ===
Western Semi-Finals
BC Lions @ Calgary Stampeders
Date	Away	Home
November 8	BC Lions 21	Calgary Stampeders 35

=== West Final ===
Western Finals – Game 1
Calgary Stampeders @ Saskatchewan Roughriders
Date	Away	Home
November 15	Calgary Stampeders 11	Saskatchewan Roughriders 17

Western Finals – Game 2
Saskatchewan Roughriders @ Calgary Stampeders
Date	Away	Home
November 19	Saskatchewan Roughriders 36	Calgary Stampeders 13

- Saskatchewan wins the best of three series 2–0. The Roughriders will advance to the Grey Cup Championship game.

== Awards and records ==
=== 1969 CFL All-Stars ===
TE – Herman Harrison, CFL All-Star
