= Roger Perdrix =

American gridiron football player (born 1943)

Profile
- Positions: Guard, Tackle

Personal information
- Born: June 17, 1943 (age 83); Boston, Massachusetts, U.S.
- Listed height: 6 ft 1 in (1.85 m)
- Listed weight: 225 lb (102 kg)

Career information
- College: Cincinnati

Career history
- 1966–1974: Ottawa Rough Riders

Awards and highlights
- Grey Cup champion (1968, 1969, 1973)

Roger Perdrix (born June 17, 1943) was an American professional football player who played for the Ottawa Rough Riders. He won the Grey Cup in 1968, 1969, and 1973. He previously played college football at the University of Cincinnati.
