= 1967 Calgary Stampeders season =

Canadian football team season

- General manager: Rogers Lehew
- Head coach: Jerry Williams
- Home stadium: McMahon Stadium

Results
- Record: 12–4
- Division place: 1st, West
- Playoffs: Lost Western Finals

The 1967 Calgary Stampeders finished in first place in the Western Conference with a 12–4 record. They were defeated in the Western Final by the Saskatchewan Roughriders.

== Regular season ==
=== Season standings ===
Western Football Conference
Team	GP	W	L	T	PF	PA	Pts
Calgary Stampeders	16	12	4	0	382	219	24
Saskatchewan Roughriders	16	12	4	0	346	282	24
Edmonton Eskimos	16	9	6	1	266	246	19
Winnipeg Blue Bombers	16	4	12	0	212	414	8
BC Lions	16	3	12	1	239	319	7

=== Season schedule ===
Week	Game	Date	Opponent	Results		Venue	Attendance
Week	Game	Date	Opponent	Score	Record	Venue	Attendance
	1		BC Lions	W 20–7	1–0		
	2		Winnipeg Blue Bombers	L 16–27	1–1		
	3		Saskatchewan Roughriders	W 36–10	2–1		
	4		Edmonton Eskimos	W 16–0	3–1		
	5		BC Lions	W 16–7	4–1		
	6		Winnipeg Blue Bombers	W 39–0	5–1		
	7		Ottawa Rough Riders	W 20–13	6–1		
	8		Montreal Alouettes	W 4–0	7–1		
	9		Toronto Argonauts	L 13–22	7–2		
	10		Saskatchewan Roughriders	L 27–28	7–3		
	11		Edmonton Eskimos	W 25–5	8–3		
	12		Hamilton Tiger-Cats	W 34–10	9–3		
	13		Winnipeg Blue Bombers	W 51–29	10–3		
	14		Saskatchewan Roughriders	W 19–11	11–3		
	15		Edmonton Eskimos	L 11–20	11–4		
	16		BC Lions	W 35–30	12–4		

== Playoffs ==
=== West Finals ===
Western Finals – Game 1
Saskatchewan Roughriders @ Calgary Stampeders
Date	Away	Home
November 18	Saskatchewan Roughriders 11	Calgary Stampeders 15

Western Finals – Game 2
Calgary Stampeders @ Saskatchewan Roughriders
Date	Away	Home
November 22	Calgary Stampeders 9	Saskatchewan Roughriders 11

Western Finals – Game 3
Saskatchewan Roughriders @ Calgary Stampeders
Date	Away	Home
November 26	Saskatchewan Roughriders 17	Calgary Stampeders 13

- Saskatchewan wins the best of three series 2–1. The Roughriders will advance to the Grey Cup Championship game. .
