= 1969 Ottawa Rough Riders season =

Canadian football team season

- Owner: David Loeb
- General manager: Red O'Quinn
- Head coach: Frank Clair
- Home stadium: Lansdowne Park

Results
- Record: 11–3
- Division place: 1st, East
- Playoffs: Won Grey Cup

The 1969 Ottawa Rough Riders finished in first place in the Eastern Conference with an 11–3 record and won the 57th Grey Cup, repeating as Grey Cup Champions. Russ Jackson retired from the Canadian Football League after this game, having won three Grey Cup championships. He retired with the team record for total career passing yards with 24,952.

== Preseason ==
Week	Date	Opponent	Result	Record
A	July 5	at Montreal Alouettes	W 26–20	1–0
B	July 14	vs. Edmonton Eskimos	L 13–15	1–1
C	July 18	at Saskatchewan Roughriders	L 5–6	1–2
D	July 22	vs. Saskatchewan Roughriders	W 39–8	2–2

== Regular season ==
=== Standings ===
Eastern Football Conference
Team	GP	W	L	T	PF	PA	Pts
Ottawa Rough Riders	14	11	3	0	399	298	22
Toronto Argonauts	14	10	4	0	406	280	20
Hamilton Tiger-Cats	14	8	5	1	307	315	17
Montreal Alouettes	14	2	10	2	304	395	6

=== Schedule ===
Week	Game	Date	Opponent	Result	Record
1	1	July 30	vs. Montreal Alouettes	W 47–15	1–0
2	2	Aug 6	at Calgary Stampeders	W 35–19	2–0
3	3	Aug 13	vs. BC Lions	W 41–24	3–0
4	4	Aug 20	at Montreal Alouettes	W 17–15	4–0
5	5	Sept 1	at Hamilton Tiger-Cats	L 22–27	4–1
6	6	Sept 6	vs. Montreal Alouettes	W 47–22	5–1
7	7	Sept 13	vs. Toronto Argonauts	W 25–23	6–1
8	8	Sept 20	at Toronto Argonauts	W 34–27	7–1
9	9	Sept 27	vs. Edmonton Eskimos	W 17–0	8–1
10	10	Oct 4	vs. Hamilton Tiger-Cats	W 28–20	9–1
11	11	Oct 12	at Saskatchewan Roughriders	L 21–38	9–2
11	12	Oct 15	at Winnipeg Blue Bombers	W 38–31	10–2
12	13	Oct 25	vs. Toronto Argonauts	W 20–9	11–2
13	14	Nov 1	at Hamilton Tiger-Cats	L 7–28	11–3

== Postseason ==
=== Playoffs ===
Round	Date	Opponent	Result	Record
East Final #1	Nov 16	at Toronto Argonauts	L 14–22	0–1
East Final #2	Nov 22	vs. Toronto Argonauts	W 32–3	1–1
Grey Cup	Nov 30	vs. Saskatchewan Roughriders	W 29–11	2–1

=== Grey Cup ===
Teams	1 Q	2 Q	3 Q	4 Q	Final
Saskatchewan Roughriders	9	0	2	0	11
Ottawa Roughriders	0	14	7	8	29

== Player stats ==
=== Passing ===
Player	Games Played	Attempts	Completions	Percentage	Yards	Touchdowns	Interceptions
Russ Jackson	14	358	193	53.9%	3641	33	12

== Awards and honours ==
- CFL's Most Outstanding Player Award – Russ Jackson (QB)
- CFL's Most Outstanding Canadian Award – Russ Jackson (QB)
- Grey Cup Most Valuable Player – Russ Jackson
- Jeff Russell Memorial Trophy – Russ Jackson
- Russ Jackson, QB, Eastern Division All-Star
- Russ Jackson, CFL Pass Attempts Leader
- Russ Jackson, Lionel Conacher Trophy
- Russ Jackson, Lou Marsh Trophy

=== CFL All-Stars ===
- Russ Jackson, QB
- Vic Washington, RB
- Margene Adkins, SE
- Billy Joe Booth, DE
- Ken Lehmann, LB
- Jerry "Soupy" Campbell, LB
- Don Sutherin, DB
