= Marty Martinello =

Canadian football player (1931–2022)

Profile
- Positions: Nose tackle, defensive tackle

Personal information
- Born: January 6, 1931; Sydney, Nova Scotia, Canada
- Died: March 24, 2022 (aged 91); Ontario, Canada
- Listed height: 5 ft 11 in (1.80 m)
- Listed weight: 225 lb (102 kg)

Career history
- 1954–1957: Montreal Alouettes
- 1958–1959: BC Lions
- 1959–1965: Toronto Argonauts
- 1965–1966: Hamilton Tiger-Cats

Awards and highlights
- Grey Cup champion (1965); 2× CFL East All-Star (1960, 1961)

Emelio Martinello (January 6, 1931 – March 24, 2022) was a Canadian professional football player as part of the Brantford Redskins of the Ontario Rugby Football Union and then thirteen seasons as a defensive lineman in the Canadian Football League, becoming a CFL east all-star in 1960 and 1961 for the Toronto Argonauts, winning a Grey Cup with the Hamilton Tiger-Cats in his next to last season. Martinello died in 2022 at the age of 91.
