= 1964 BC Lions season =

Canadian football team season

- General manager: Herb Capozzi
- Head coach: Dave Skrien
- Home stadium: Empire Stadium

Results
- Record: 11–2–3
- Division place: 1st, West
- Playoffs: Won Grey Cup

Uniform
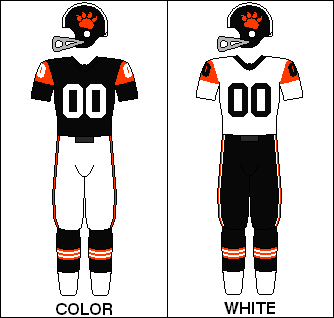

The 1964 BC Lions finished the season in first place in the Western Conference with an 11–2–3 record, the fewest losses in one season in team history. Of the eight retired numbers in team history, four of those players played on the 1964 team. The Lions began the season undefeated in ten games and were 10–1–1 against western opponents. The Lions' defense was, once again, outstanding as they allowed a team record 10.5 points and 245 yards per game. Joe Kapp would lead the CFL in passing with 2816 yards through the air and 194 completions.

The Lions won the Western Finals over Calgary, taking two games to one, sending them to the Grey Cup Once again, the Lions met the Hamilton Tiger-Cats in the 52nd Grey Cup in a rematch of the previous year's game. After taking a 34–8 lead into the fourth quarter, the Lions cruised to their first championship by a score of 34–24 on the heels of defensive back and backup fullback Bill Munsey's two touchdown performance. Converted defensive back By Bailey, who scored the first touchdown in Lions' history, retired after the game, ending his 11-year CFL career.

The Lions had six CFL All-stars, including quarterback Joe Kapp, offensive tackle Lonnie Dennis, defensive tackle Mike Cacic, defensive end Dick Fouts, middle guard Tom Brown, and Bill Munsey at defensive back.

The Schenley for the CFL's Most Outstanding Lineman went to defensive lineman Tom Brown for a second season in a row.

== Preseason ==
Game	Date	Opponent	Results		Venue	Attendance
Game	Date	Opponent	Score	Record	Venue	Attendance
A	Thu, July 16	at Ottawa Rough Riders	L 6–21	0–1	Lansdowne Park	15,020
A	Mon, July 20	vs. Hamilton Tiger-Cats	L 0–3	0–2	Empire Stadium	17,720
B	Wed, July 29	vs. Toronto Argonauts	L 17–26	0–3	Empire Stadium	24,033

== Regular season ==
=== Season standings ===
Western Football Conference
Team	GP	W	L	T	PF	PA	Pts
BC Lions	16	11	2	3	328	168	25
Calgary Stampeders	16	12	4	0	352	349	24
Saskatchewan Roughriders	16	9	7	0	330	282	18
Edmonton Eskimos	16	4	12	0	222	458	8
Winnipeg Blue Bombers	16	1	14	1	270	397	3

=== Season schedule ===
Week	Game	Date	Opponent	Results		Venue	Attendance
Week	Game	Date	Opponent	Score	Record	Venue	Attendance
1	1	Tue, Aug 4	at Winnipeg Blue Bombers	T 10–10	0–0–1	Winnipeg Stadium	15,125
1	2	Mon, Aug 10	vs. Calgary Stampeders	W 22–4	1–0–1	Empire Stadium	32,664
2	3	Fri, Aug 14	at Saskatchewan Roughriders	W 17–2	2–0–1	Taylor Field	17,787
3	4	Wed, Aug 19	vs. Saskatchewan Roughriders	W 27–16	3–0–1	Empire Stadium	35,618
4	5	Sun, Aug 30	vs. Winnipeg Blue Bombers	W 21–4	4–0–1	Empire Stadium	33,607
5	Bye						
6	6	Tue, Sept 8	vs. Ottawa Rough Riders	T 17–17	4–0–2	Empire Stadium	31,355
7	7	Sat, Sept 19	at Edmonton Eskimos	W 49–6	5–0–2	Clarke Stadium	21,000
8	8	Tue, Sept 22	at Calgary Stampeders	W 12–7	6–0–2	McMahon Stadium	19,546
8	9	Sat, Sept 26	vs. Hamilton Tiger-Cats	T 16–16	6–0–3	Empire Stadium	37,008
9	10	Sat, Oct 3	at Toronto Argonauts	W 20–15	7–0–3	Exhibition Stadium	27,249
9	11	Mon, Oct 5	at Montreal Alouettes	L 7–14	7–1–3	McGill Stadium	17,084
10	12	Sat, Oct 10	vs. Edmonton Eskimos	W 26–6	8–1–3	Empire Stadium	29,277
11	13	Sat, Oct 17	at Edmonton Eskimos	W 24–14	9–1–3	Clark Stadium	12,000
12	14	Sat, Oct 24	vs. Saskatchewan Roughriders	W 20–3	10–1–3	Empire Stadium	30,856
13	15	Wed, Oct 28	at Calgary Stampeders	L 14–26	10–2–3	McMahon Stadium	20,000
14	16	Sun, Nov 1	vs. Winnipeg Blue Bombers	W 26–8	11–2–3	Empire Stadium	29,614

== Playoffs ==
=== West Finals ===
Western-Finals – Game 1
BC Lions @ Calgary Stampeders
Date	Away	Home
November 14	BC Lions 24	Calgary Stampeders 10

Western Finals – Game 2
Calgary Stampeders @ BC Lions
Date	Away	Home
November 18	Calgary Stampeders 14	BC Lions 10

Western Finals – Game 3
Calgary Stampeders @ BC Lions
Date	Away	Home
November 22	Calgary Stampeders 14	BC Lions 33

- BC wins the best-of-three series 2–1 and advance to the Grey Cup Championship game.

=== Grey Cup ===
November 28 52nd Annual Grey Cup Game: Exhibition Stadium – Toronto, Ontario
Western Champion	Eastern Champion
BC Lions 34	Hamilton Tiger-Cats 24
The BC Lions are the 1964 Grey Cup Champions.

=== Offensive leaders ===
Player	Passing yds	Rushing yds	Receiving yds	TD
Joe Kapp	2816	370	0	6
Willie Fleming		750	473	10
Bob Swift		1054	80	11
Sonny Homer		0	776	4
Mack Burton		0	636	3
Pat Claridge		0	577	1

== Awards and records ==
- CFL's Most Outstanding Lineman Award – Tom Brown (LB)
- Jeff Nicklin Memorial Trophy – Tom Brown (LB)

=== 1964 CFL All-Stars ===
- QB – Joe Kapp, CFL All-Star
- OT – Lonnie Dennis, CFL All-Star
- DT – Mike Cacic, CFL All-Star
- DE – Dick Fouts, CFL All-Star
- MG – Tom Brown, CFL All-Star
- DB – Bill Munsey, CFL All-Star
