= Jim Carphin =

Canadian gridiron football player (born 1938)

Profile
- Positions: End, Tight end

Personal information
- Born: October 21, 1938 (age 88); Winnipeg, Manitoba, Canada
- Listed height: 6 ft 3 in (1.91 m)
- Listed weight: 210 lb (95 kg)

Career information
- College: Washington

Career history
- 1960–1966, 1968: BC Lions
- 1967: Saskatchewan Roughriders

Awards and highlights
- Grey Cup champion (1964)

Jim Carphin (born October 21, 1938) is a Canadian former professional football player who played for the BC Lions and Saskatchewan Roughriders. He won the Grey Cup with the Lions in 1964. He played college football at the University of Washington. After his football career, he was a lawyer.
