= Ottawa Rough Riders seasons (1960–1969) =

Canadian football team seasons

During the decade, Russ Jackson never missed a game due to injury. Every year in the decade, Jackson led the Rough Riders to the playoffs. From 1963 to 1969, he was the Eastern Division Passing Leader.

== 1961 ==
1961 Ottawa Rough Riders season
- Owner: Sam Berger
- General manager: George Terlep
- Head coach: Frank Clair
- Home stadium: Lansdowne Park

Results
- Record: 8–6
- Division place: 2nd, East
- Playoffs: Lost Eastern Semi-Finals

=== Schedule ===
| Week | Game | Date | Opponent | Results | | Venue | Attendance |
| Week | Game | Date | Opponent | Score | Record | Venue | Attendance |
|---|---|---|---|---|---|---|---|
| 1 | 1 | | Winnipeg Blue Bombers | L 19–29 | 0–1 | | |
| 2 | 2 | | Calgary Stampeders | W 32–1 | 1–1 | | |

== 1962 ==
1962 Ottawa Rough Riders season
- Owner: Sam Berger
- General manager: George Terlep
- Head coach: Frank Clair
- Home stadium: Lansdowne Park

Results
- Record: 6–7–1
- Division place: 2nd, East
- Playoffs: Lost Eastern Semi-Finals

=== Schedule ===
| Week | Game | Date | Opponent | Results | | Venue | Attendance |
| Week | Game | Date | Opponent | Score | Record | Venue | Attendance |
|---|---|---|---|---|---|---|---|
| 1 | 1 | | Hamilton Tiger-Cats | L 16–28 | 0–1 | | |
| 2 | 2 | | Montreal Alouettes | W 29–18 | 1–1 | | |

=== Awards and honours ===
- Russ Jackson, QB, Eastern Division All-Star

== 1963 ==
1963 Ottawa Rough Riders season
- Owner: Sam Berger
- General manager: Red O'Quinn
- Head coach: Frank Clair
- Home stadium: Lansdowne Park

Results
- Record: 9–5
- Division place: 2nd, East
- Playoffs: Lost Eastern Finals

In 1963, Russ Jackson was the first double winner of the Schenley Outstanding Canadian and Outstanding Player Awards.

=== Schedule ===
| Week | Game | Date | Opponent | Results | | Venue | Attendance |
| Week | Game | Date | Opponent | Score | Record | Venue | Attendance |
|---|---|---|---|---|---|---|---|
| 1 | 1 | | Toronto Argonauts | L 5–8 | 0–1 | | |
| 2 | 2 | | Montreal Alouettes | W 31–14 | 1–1 | | |

=== Awards and honours ===
- CFL's Most Outstanding Player Award – Russ Jackson (QB)
- CFL's Most Outstanding Canadian Award – Russ Jackson (QB)
- Russ Jackson, QB, Eastern Division All-Star
- Russ Jackson, CFL Passing Yards Leader
- Russ Jackson, CFL Pass Attempts Leader

== 1964 ==
1964 Ottawa Rough Riders season
- Owner: Sam Berger
- General manager: Red O'Quinn
- Head coach: Frank Clair
- Home stadium: Lansdowne Park

Results
- Record: 8–5–1
- Division place: 2nd, East
- Playoffs: Lost Eastern Finals

=== Schedule ===
| Week | Game | Date | Opponent | Results | | Venue | Attendance |
| Week | Game | Date | Opponent | Score | Record | Venue | Attendance |
|---|---|---|---|---|---|---|---|
| 1 | 1 | | Toronto Argonauts | L 21–23 | 0–1 | | |
| 2 | 2 | | Hamilton Tiger-Cats | W 13–10 | 1–1 | | |

=== Awards and honours ===
- Russ Jackson, CFL Passing Yards Leader

== 1965 ==
1965 Ottawa Rough Riders season
- Owner: Sam Berger
- General manager: Red O'Quinn
- Head coach: Frank Clair
- Home stadium: Lansdowne Park

Results
- Record: 7–7
- Division place: 2nd, East
- Playoffs: Lost Eastern Finals

=== Schedule ===
| Week | Game | Date | Opponent | Results | | Venue | Attendance |
| Week | Game | Date | Opponent | Score | Record | Venue | Attendance |
|---|---|---|---|---|---|---|---|
| 1 | 1 | | Toronto Argonauts | W 17–14 | 1–0 | | |
| 2 | 2 | | Montreal Alouettes | W 23–2 | 2–0 | | |

=== Awards and honours ===
- Russ Jackson, CFL Passing Yards Leader

== 1966 ==
1966 Ottawa Rough Riders season
- Owner: Sam Berger
- General manager: Red O'Quinn
- Head coach: Frank Clair
- Home stadium: Lansdowne Park

Results
- Record: 11–3
- Division place: 1st, East
- Playoffs: Lost Grey Cup

=== Schedule ===
| Week | Game | Date | Opponent | Results | | Venue | Attendance |
| Week | Game | Date | Opponent | Score | Record | Venue | Attendance |
|---|---|---|---|---|---|---|---|
| 1 | 1 | | Montreal Alouettes | W 10–8 | 1–0 | | |
| 2 | 2 | | Calgary Stampeders | W 13–6 | 2–0 | | |

=== Awards and honours ===
- CFL's Most Outstanding Player Award – Russ Jackson (QB)
- CFL's Most Outstanding Canadian Award – Russ Jackson (QB)
- CFL's Coach of the Year – Frank Clair
- Russ Jackson, QB, Eastern Division All-Star
- Russ Jackson, CFL Passing Yards Leader
- Russ Jackson, CFL Pass Attempts Leader

==== CFL All-Stars ====
- Russ Jackson, QB
