= List of Hamilton Tigers seasons =

List of Canadian football team seasons

This is an incomplete list of seasons competed by the Hamilton Tigers, a Canadian football team that competed in the Interprovincial Rugby Football Union and Ontario Rugby Football Union. The Hamilton Football Club was formed on November 3, 1869, and was first referred to as the Tigers in a game against the Toronto Argonauts on October 18, 1873, while also wearing black and gold for the first time. They were one of four original teams that formed the IRFU on September 13, 1907, and played in that league for 34 seasons before joining the ORFU in 1948.

In 1941, during World War II, a new team, named the Hamilton Wildcats began playing in the Ontario Rugby Football Union after the Tigers suspended operations due to most of their players fighting in the war. After the Tigers rejoined the IRFU, the two teams were simultaneously competing for the Grey Cup. In 1950, the two clubs merged under the moniker Hamilton Tiger-Cats after it became apparent that both teams would not be able to compete financially in the same market.

Throughout their history, the Tigers won two Dominion championships and five Grey Cups.

Grey Cup/Dominion Championships†	League Championships	Regular season championships

League Season	Tigers Season	League	Finish	Wins	Losses	Ties	Playoffs
1897	1897	ORFU	No regular season				Won ORFU Semi-Finals (Lornes) 2-0 series (47-17 points); Won ORFU Finals (Osgoode Hall) 1-1 series (18-14 points); Lost Dominion Championship (Ottawa College) 14-10
1898	1898	ORFU	2nd	4	2	0	
1899	1899	ORFU	4th	0	6	0	
1900	1900	ORFU	3rd	1	5	0	
1901	1901	ORFU	3rd	2	4	0	
1902	1902	ORFU	3rd	0	1	0	Ceased operations after one game
1903	1903	ORFU	1st	4	0	0	Won ORFU Finals (Torontos) 20–7; No Dominion Championship played in this year
1904	1904	ORFU	1st	4	0	0	Won ORFU Finals (Torontos) 2–0 series No Dominion Championship played in this year
1905	1905	ORFU	1st	6	0	0	Won ORFU Cup, but were not permitted to play for the Dominion Championship
1906	1906	ORFU	1st	6	0	0	Won Dominion Semi-Final (Montreal FBC) 11–6; Won Dominion Championship (McGill) 29–3
1907	1907	IRFU	2nd	4	2	0	
1908	1908	IRFU	2nd	5	1	0	Won League Playoff (Rough Riders) 11–9; Won Dominion Semi-Final (TAAC) 31–8; Won Dominion Championship (Varsity Blues) 21–17
1909	1909	IRFU	1st	5	1	0	Lost League Playoff (Rough Riders) 14–8
1910	1910	IRFU	1st	4	2	0	Lost Grey Cup (Varsity Blues) 16–7
1911	1911	IRFU	2nd	3	3	0	
1912	1912	IRFU	3rd	3	3	0	
1913	1913	IRFU	1st	5	1	0	Won Grey Cup (TPCC) 44–2
1914	1914	IRFU	1st	5	1	0	Lost League Playoff (Argonauts) 0–1–1 series
1915	1915	IRFU	1st	6	0	0	Won Grey Cup (TRAA) 13–7
1916	Season suspended due to World War I.						
1917	Season suspended due to World War I.						
1918	Season suspended due to World War I.						
1919	1919	IRFU	3rd	3	3	0	
1920	1920	IRFU	2nd	4	2	0	
1921	1921	IRFU	3rd	3	3	0	
1922	1922	IRFU	2nd	3	1	2	
1923	1923	IRFU	1st	4	1	1	Won East Semi-Final (HRC) 24–1; Lost East Final (Queen's) 13–5
1924	1924	IRFU	1st	5	1	0	Lost East Final (Queen's) 11–1
1925	1925	IRFU	3rd	2	3	1	
1926	1926	IRFU	2nd	3	3	0	
1927	1927	IRFU	1st	5	1	0	Won East Final (Queen's) 21–6; Lost Grey Cup (Beachers) 9–6
1928	1928	IRFU	1st	6	0	0	Won East Final (Varsity Blues) 28–5; Won Grey Cup (Roughriders) 30–0
1929	1929	IRFU	1st	5	1	0	Won East Semi-Final (Imperials) 14–2; Won East Final (Queen's) 14–3; Won Grey Cup (Roughriders) 14–3
1930	1930	IRFU	1st	4	0	2	Won East Semi-Final (Queen's) 8–3; Lost East Final (Beachers) 8–5
1931	1931	IRFU	2nd	3	3	0	
1932	1932	IRFU	1st	5	1	0	Won East Semi-Final (Imperials) 15–11; Won East Final (Varsity Blues) 9–3; Won Grey Cup (Roughriders) 25–6
1933	1933	IRFU	4th	1	5	0	
1934	1934	IRFU	1st	3	1	2	Lost East Semi-Final (Imperials) 11–4
1935	1935	IRFU	1st	7	2	0	Won East Semi-Final (Queen's) 44–4; Won East Final (Imperials) 22–0; Lost Grey Cup ('Pegs) 18–12
1936	1936	IRFU	3rd	3	3	0	Lost IRFU Semi-Final (Rough Riders) 3–2
1937	1937	IRFU	3rd	2	4	0	
1938	1938	IRFU	3rd	2	4	0	
1939	1939	IRFU	3rd	2	4	0	
1940	1940	IRFU	3rd	2	4	0	
1941	did not participate						
1942	Season cancelled (World War II)						
1943	Season cancelled (World War II)						
1944	Season cancelled (World War II)						
1945	1945	IRFU	3rd	1	5	0	
1946	1946	IRFU	4th	0	10	2	
1947	1947	IRFU	3rd	1	5	0	
1948	1948	ORFU	1st	9	0	0	Won ORFU Finals (Beaches-Indians) 2–0 series Lost Eastern Finals (Rough Riders) 19–0
1949	1949	ORFU	1st	10	2	0	Won ORFU Finals (Imperials) 1–1 series (26–18 points); Lost Eastern Finals (Alouettes) 40–0
Merged to form Hamilton Tiger-Cats
Regular season Totals (1898–1949)				165	104	10	
Playoff Totals (1898–1949)				21	10	1	
Grey Cup Totals (1909–1949)				5	3		
Dominion Championship Totals (1897–1908)				2	1		

== See also ==
- List of Hamilton Tiger-Cats seasons
