= Brian Timmis =

Canadian football player (1899–1971)

Profile
- Positions: Halfback, Fullback, MW, T

Personal information
- Born: December 5, 1899; Winnipeg, Manitoba, Canada
- Died: August 22, 1971 (aged 71); Hamilton, Ontario, Canada
- Listed height: 5 ft 11 in (1.80 m)
- Listed weight: 200 lb (91 kg)

Career information
- High school: Elgin High School
- Junior football: Ottawa Seconds

Career history

Playing
- 1920–1922: Regina Rugby Club
- 1923: Ottawa Rough Riders
- 1924–1935, 1936: Hamilton Tigers

Coaching
- 1943: Hamilton Flying Wildcats

Awards and highlights
- As player: 3× Grey Cup champion (1928, 1929, 1932); 2× CFL East All-Star (1932, 1934); As coach: Grey Cup champion (1943)
- Canadian Football Hall of Fame (Class of 1963)

Brian Mercer "Old Man of the Mountain" Timmis (December 5, 1899 – August 22, 1971) was a star senior Canadian football player in the Saskatchewan Rugby Football Union (SRFU) and Interprovincial Rugby Football Union (IRFU) for a combined 17 seasons, mainly for the Hamilton Tigers. He is a three-time Grey Cup champion as a player, having won with the Tigers in 1928, 1929, and 1932. He later coached the Hamilton Flying Wildcats, leading them to the 1943 Grey Cup championship. He was an inaugural member of the Canadian Football Hall of Fame in 1963 and was also inducted into Canada's Sports Hall of Fame in 1975. Brian Timmis Stadium in Hamilton, Ontario was named after him.

== Early life ==
Timmis was born in Winnipeg and moved to Ottawa in 1910 where his father, a militia member, was stationed. He played football locally before enlisting in the Canadian Armed Forces in 1915 by stating he was two years older than he actually was. After returning from the First World War in 1919, he played junior football for the Ottawa Seconds. After being released from military service, Timmis joined the Royal Canadian Mounted Police where he was stationed in Regina.

== Senior football career ==
Following his move to Regina, Timmis played locally for the Regina Rugby Club where he played from 1920 to 1922. In a game in 1921, an opponent nearly strangled him with his own chinstrap, so Timmis played the rest of his career without a helmet. In 1923, he moved back to Ottawa and played one season for the Ottawa Rough Riders.

He joined the Hamilton Tigers in 1924 and played in his first game with the club on October 4, 1924, starting at middle wing. The team finished in first place in the IRFU in 1924, but lost the East Final to the Queen's Golden Gaels. After sub-par seasons in 1925 and 1926, where the team did not qualify for playoffs, Timmis played in his first Grey Cup game in 1927, but the Tigers lost to the Toronto Balmy Beach Beachers. The Tigers then won back-to-back Grey Cup championships over Timmis' former club, Regina, in 1928 and 1929 while Timmis scored two touchdowns in the 1928 game. Timmis was named an Eastern All-Star by the Canadian Press in 1932 at the Tackle position, which was the first year players were named all-stars. He capped off his year by winning his third Grey Cup championship in the 20th Grey Cup game by once again defeating the Regina Roughriders. He retired at the end of the 1935 season which culminated in a Grey Cup loss to the Winnipeg Pegs.

At the behest of the Tigers organization, Timmis came out of retirement to play in the team's 1936 IRFU playoff game against the Ottawa Rough Riders in Ottawa. He played with infected tonsils and shoulder neuritis, leaving his left arm limp, but still played the entire game. He was cheered on by the crowd in Ottawa as he left the field as a player for the final time.

== Coaching career ==
After his playing career, Timmis had numerous stints as a football coach, highlighted by his 1943 season when he coached the Hamilton Flying Wildcats to a win in the 31st Grey Cup game.

== Personal life ==
Timmis' son, Brian II, played fullback for the Saskatchewan Roughriders (the same club that Timmis had played for) in 1953. His great-grandson, Mercer Timmis, was drafted by the Hamilton Tiger-Cats (a continuation of the Tigers and Flying Wildcats) and, as of 2018, plays as running back for the team.
