= Alex Denman =

Canadian football player (1901–1958)

Alec Denman
Profile
- Positions: Guard & Flying Wing

Personal information
- Born: 1901; Sault Ste. Marie, Ontario, Canada
- Died: February 26, 1958 (aged 56–57); Sudbury, Ontario, Canada

Career information
- College: Woodstock College

Career history
- 1923–33: Hamilton Tigers

Awards and highlights
- 3× Grey Cup champion (1928, 1929, 1932); Jeff Russel Memorial Trophy (1932); 4× CFL All-Star (1926, 28, 31, 32)

John Alexander Denman (1901 – February 26, 1958) was a Grey Cup champion and all-star Canadian football player, playing from 1923 to 1933 with the Hamilton Tigers.

A graduate of Woodstock College Denman went on to have an all-star 11 year football career with the Tigers. Selected 4 times as an all-star and the winner of 3 Grey Cups, his best season was 1932 when, in addition to his all-star, he won the Jeff Russel Memorial Trophy as outstanding player in the east. Denman was part of an inquiry by the Director of Dental Services for Ontario, and he reported having lost 3 teeth playing football. He later worked as a district representative for a cigarette company, and died in Sudbury in 1958.
