= David Sprague =

Canadian football player (1910–1968)

Profile
- Positions: Running back, defensive tackle

Personal information
- Born: August 11, 1910; Dunkirk, New York, U.S.
- Died: February 20, 1968 (aged 57); Ottawa, Ontario, Canada

Career information
- College: Delta Collegiate

Career history
- 1930–1932: Hamilton Tigers
- 1933–1940: Ottawa Rough Riders

Awards and highlights
- 2× Grey Cup champion (1932, 1940); 4× CFL East All-Star (1932, 1936, 1939, 1940)
- Canadian Football Hall of Fame (Class of 1963)

David Shafer Sprague (August 11, 1910 – February 20, 1968) was a star football player in the Canadian Football League (CFL) for eleven seasons for the Hamilton Tigers and the Ottawa Rough Riders. He was inducted into the Canadian Football Hall of Fame in 1963 and into the Canada's Sports Hall of Fame in 1975.

Sprague represented Elmdale Ward for one year on Ottawa City Council in 1940. In the 1940 election he ran for a seat on the Ottawa Board of Control, but lost.
