= Harry Griffith (Canadian football) =

Canadian gridiron football coach (1878–1960)

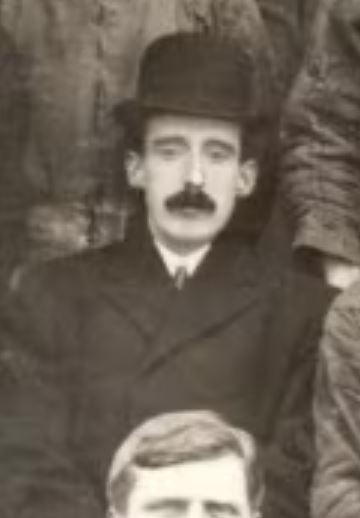
- Griffith in 1909

Profile
- Position: Quarterback

Personal information
- Born: September 19, 1878; Hamilton, Ontario, Canada
- Died: December 9, 1960 (aged 82); Toronto, Ontario, Canada

Career history
- 1899–1907: Ridley College
- 1908–1910: Toronto Varsity (Head coach)
- 1911–1949: Ridley College

Awards and highlights
- 2× Grey Cup champion (1909, 1910)
- Canadian Football Hall of Fame

Harry Crawford Griffith (September 19, 1878 – December 9, 1960) was a Canadian football player, coach, and administrator who was the head coach of the Toronto Varsity for three seasons and also served as president of the Canadian Rugby Union. He won the first two Grey Cup games as head coach of Toronto Varsity and served as a coach and headmaster for Ridley College. He was an inaugural member of the Canadian Football Hall of Fame and was inducted into Canada's Sports Hall of Fame.

== Early life ==
Griffith attended Ridley College in St. Catharines where he played at quarterback for the school's football team. He later attended Trinity College in Toronto where continued to play at quarterback.

== Coaching career ==
After obtaining his degree from Trinity College, Griffith returned to Ridley College in 1899 where he was a teacher and a coach. After developing his coaching style with the Ridley football team, he joined the Toronto Varsity football team as their head coach in 1907 while working for Trinity College as a French professor. In 1908, he led Varsity to an Intercollegiate Rugby Football Union Yates Cup championship, but lost the 1908 Dominion Championship to the Hamilton Tigers.

In 1909, Griffith led Varsity to a 6–0 regular season record, capturing their second consecutive Intercollegiate title, and appearing in their second consecutive Dominion Championship and the first to be awarded the Grey Cup. He led Varsity to a definitive 26–6 victory over Toronto Parkdale to claim a victory in the 1st Grey Cup. In the following season, Griffith again led Varsity to an undefeated season, as the team repeated as Grey Cup champions and defeated the Hamilton Tigers in the 2nd Grey Cup by a score of 16–7.

Griffith returned to Ridley College in 1911 and, over his new tenure with the school, coached the Ridley football team to 22 Little Big Four titles. He was also involved with the school's rugby and cricket teams. In 1913, he served as president of the Canadian Rugby Union and was also on the rules committee where he contributed to many rule changes and coaching techniques to improve the game of football. In 1932, he was appointed headmaster at Ridley College.

== Legacy ==
As a football coach, Griffith was known for his teams' preparation and conditioning and for his innovative coaching techniques. He was also an early pioneer of the no-huddle offense and lateral passing attacks. He developed many outstanding football players at both Ridley College and University of Toronto. He was also one of the first people honored at a Grey Cup dinner in 1960 for his contributions to football. Following his death shortly after that dinner, Griffith was an inaugural member of the Canadian Football Hall of Fame in 1963 and was inducted into Canada's Sports Hall of Fame in 1975.
