= Huck Welch =

Canadian football player (1907–1979)

Profile
- Position: Running back Placekicker

Personal information
- Born: May 9, 1907; Toronto, Ontario, Canada
- Died: May 15, 1979 (aged 72); Ancaster, Ontario, Canada

Career history
- 1928–1929: Hamilton Tigers
- 1931–1934: Montreal AAA Winged Wheelers
- 1935, 1937: Hamilton Tigers

Awards and highlights
- 3× Grey Cup champion (1928, 1929, 1931); Jeff Russel Memorial Trophy (1933)
- Canadian Football Hall of Fame (Class of 1964)

Hawley "Huck" Welch (December 12, 1907 – May 15, 1979) was a star football player in the Canadian Football League (CFL) for eight seasons for the Hamilton Tigers and the Montreal AAA Winged Wheelers. He was inducted into the Canadian Football Hall of Fame in 1964 and into the Canada's Sports Hall of Fame in 1975.
