= Ernie Cox (Canadian football) =

Canadian football player

Profile
- Position: Centre

Personal information
- Born: February 17, 1894; Hamilton, Ontario, Canada
- Died: February 26, 1962 (aged 68); Hamilton, Ontario, Canada

Career history
- 1921–1931: Hamilton Tigers

Awards and highlights
- 2× Grey Cup champion (1928, 1929); Jeff Russel Memorial Trophy (1928); 6× CFL All-Star (1923, 26–30)
- Canadian Football Hall of Fame (Class of 1963)

Ernest Cox (February 17, 1894 – February 26, 1962) was a Canadian football player who played eleven seasons for the Hamilton Tigers.

Cox was born in Hamilton, Ontario. He died in his home town of Hamilton, and was inducted into the Canadian Football Hall of Fame in 1963 and into the Canada's Sports Hall of Fame in 1975.
