= List of Montreal Alouettes seasons =

List of Canadian football team seasons

This is a complete list of seasons competed by the Montreal Alouettes, a Canadian Football League team. The team was founded in 1946 as a member of the Interprovincial Rugby Football Union, and followed the rest of the IRFU into the CFL when it was founded in 1958. The franchise folded after the 1981 season, but a new team named the Concordes took their place in the East Division and inherited the Alouettes' history. That franchise was renamed the Alouettes in 1986 on the 40th anniversary of the inception of the Alouettes franchise. However, the Alouettes folded a day before the 1987 regular season began.

The demise of the CFL's American expansion brought new life to professional football in Montreal. The owners of the Baltimore Stallions relocated to Montreal after the 1995 season and reconstituted themselves as the third incarnation of the Alouettes. The CFL does not consider the Stallions to be part of the Montreal franchise's continuity; rather, all Montreal teams since 1946 are included in the team's history. The Alouettes are now retconned as having suspended operations from 1987 to 1995.

Throughout their history, the Alouettes have won eight Grey Cups, most recently in 2023.

Grey Cup Championships †	East Division Championships *	Regular season championships ^

League season	Club season	League	Division	Finish	Wins	Losses	Ties	Playoffs
Montreal Alouettes
1946	1946	IRFU	–	1st^	7	3	2	Lost I.R.F.U Finals (Argonauts) 12–6
1947	1947	IRFU	–	3rd	6	6	0	
1948	1948	IRFU	–	2nd	7	5	0	Lost I.R.F.U. Finals (Rough Riders) 1–1 series (34–28 points)
1949	1949	IRFU†*	–	2nd	8	4	0	Won I.R.F.U. Finals (Rough Riders) 2–0 series Won Eastern Finals (Tigers) 40–0; Won Grey Cup (Stampeders) 28–15
1950	1950	IRFU	–	3rd	6	6	0	
1951	1951	IRFU	–	4th	3	9	0	
1952	1952	IRFU	–	4th	2	10	0	
1953	1953	IRFU	–	1st^	8	6	0	Lost I.R.F.U. Finals (Tiger-Cats) 0–2 series
1954	1954	IRFU*	–	1st^	11	3	0	Won I.R.F.U. Finals (Tiger-Cats) 2–0 series Lost Grey Cup (Eskimos) 26–25
1955	1955	IRFU*	–	1st^	9	3	0	Won I.R.F.U. Finals (Argonauts) 38–36; Lost Grey Cup (Eskimos) 34–19
1956	1956	IRFU*	–	1st^	10	4	0	Won I.R.F.U. Finals (Tiger-Cats) 2–0 series Lost Grey Cup (Eskimos) 50–27
1957	1957	IRFU	–	3rd	6	8	0	Won I.R.F.U. Semi-Finals (Rough Riders) 24–15; Lost I.R.F.U. Finals (Tiger-Cats) 0–2 series
1958	1958	CFL	I.R.F.U.	2nd	7	6	1	Lost I.R.F.U. Semi-Finals (Rough Riders) 26–12
1959	1959	CFL	I.R.F.U.	3rd	6	8	0	Lost East Semi-Finals (Rough Riders) 43–0
1960	1960	CFL	East	3rd	5	9	0	Lost East Semi-Finals (Rough Riders) 30–14
1961	1961	CFL	East	4th	4	9	1	
1962	1962	CFL	East	3rd	4	7	3	Won East Semi-Finals (Rough Riders) 18–17; Lost East Finals (Tiger-Cats) 0–2 series
1963	1963	CFL	East	3rd	6	8	0	Lost East Semi-Finals (Rough Riders) 17–5
1964	1964	CFL	East	3rd	6	8	0	Lost East Semi-Finals (Rough Riders) 27–0
1965	1965	CFL	East	3rd	5	9	0	Lost East Semi-Finals (Rough Riders) 36–7
1966	1966	CFL	East	3rd	7	7	0	Lost East Semi-Finals (Tiger-Cats) 24–14
1967	1967	CFL	East	4th	2	12	0	
1968	1968	CFL	East	4th	3	9	2	
1969	1969	CFL	East	4th	2	10	2	
1970	1970	CFL†	East*	3rd	7	6	1	Won East Semi-Finals (Argonauts) 16–7; Won East Finals (Tiger-Cats) 2–0 series Won Grey Cup (Stampeders) 23–10
1971	1971	CFL	East	4th	6	8	0	
1972	1972	CFL	East	3rd	4	10	0	Lost East Semi-Final (Rough Riders) 14–11
1973	1973	CFL	East	3rd	7	6	1	Won East Semi-Final (Argonauts) 32–10 (OT); Lost East Final (Rough Riders) 23–14
1974	1974	CFL†	East*	1st^	9	5	2	Won East Final (Rough Riders) 14–4; Won Grey Cup (Eskimos) 20–7
1975	1975	CFL	East*	2nd	9	7	0	Won East Semi-Final (Tiger-Cats) 35–12; Won East Final (Rough Riders) 20–10; Lost Grey Cup (Eskimos) 9–8
1976	1976	CFL	East	3rd	7	8	1	Lost East Semi-Final (Tiger-Cats) 23–0
1977	1977	CFL†	East*	1st^	11	5	0	Won East Final (Rough Riders) 21–18; Won Grey Cup (Eskimos) 41–6
1978	1978	CFL	East*	2nd	8	7	1	Won East Semi-Final (Tiger-Cats) 35–20; Won East Final (Rough Riders) 21–16; Lost Grey Cup (Eskimos) 20–13
1979	1979	CFL	East*	1st^	11	4	1	Won East Final (Rough Riders) 17–6; Lost Grey Cup (Eskimos) 17–9
1980	1980	CFL	East	2nd	8	8	0	Won East Semi-Final (Rough Riders) 25–21; Lost East Final (Tiger-Cats) 24–13
1981	1981	CFL	East	3rd	3	13	0	Lost East Semi-Final (Rough Riders) 20–16
Montreal Concordes
1982	1982	CFL	East	4th	2	14	0	
1983	1983	CFL	East	4th	5	10	1	
1984	1984	CFL	East	3rd	6	9	1	Lost East Semi-Final (Tiger-Cats) 17–11
1985	1985	CFL	East	2nd	8	8	0	Won East Semi-Final (Rough Riders) 30–20; Lost East Final (Tiger-Cats) 50–26
Montreal Alouettes
1986	1986	CFL	East	3rd	4	14	0	
1987	1987	CFL	East	Folded after the preseason				
1988	Inactive from 1988–1995							
1989	Inactive from 1988–1995							
1990	Inactive from 1988–1995							
1991	Inactive from 1988–1995							
1992	Inactive from 1988–1995							
1993	Inactive from 1988–1995							
1994	Inactive from 1988–1995							
1995	Inactive from 1988–1995							
Montreal Alouettes
1996	1996	CFL	East	2nd	12	6	0	Won East Semi-Final (Tiger-Cats) 22–11; Lost East Final (Argonauts) 43–7
1997	1997	CFL	East	2nd	13	5	0	Won East Semi-Final (Lions) 45–35; Lost East Final (Argonauts) 37–30
1998	1998	CFL	East	2nd	12	5	1	Won East Semi-Final (Argonauts) 41–28; Lost East Final (Tiger-Cats) 22–20
1999	1999	CFL	East	1st^	12	6	0	Lost East Final (Tiger-Cats) 27–26
2000	2000	CFL	East*	1st^	12	6	0	Won East Final (Blue Bombers) 35–24; Lost Grey Cup (Lions) 28–26
2001	2001	CFL	East	3rd	9	9	0	Lost East Semi-Final (Tiger-Cats) 24–12
2002	2002	CFL†	East*	1st^	13	5	0	Won East Final (Argonauts) 35–18; Won Grey Cup (Eskimos) 25–16
2003	2003	CFL	East*	1st^	13	5	0	Won East Final (Argonauts) 30–26; Lost Grey Cup (Eskimos) 34–22
2004	2004	CFL	East	1st^	14	4	0	Lost East Final (Argonauts) 26–18
2005	2005	CFL	East*	2nd	10	8	0	Won East Semi-Final (Roughriders) 30–14; Won East Final (Argonauts) 33–17; Lost Grey Cup (Eskimos) 38–35
2006	2006	CFL	East*	1st^	10	8	0	Won East Final (Argonauts) 33–24; Lost Grey Cup (Lions) 25–14
2007	2007	CFL	East	3rd	8	10	0	Lost East Semi-Final (Blue Bombers) 24–22
2008	2008	CFL	East*	1st^	11	7	0	Won East Final (Eskimos) 36–26; Lost Grey Cup (Stampeders) 22–14
2009	2009	CFL†	East*	1st^	15	3	0	Won East Final (Lions) 56–18; Won Grey Cup (Roughriders) 28–27
2010	2010	CFL†	East*	1st^	12	6	0	Won East Final (Argonauts) 48–17; Won Grey Cup (Roughriders) 21–18
2011	2011	CFL	East	2nd	10	8	0	Lost East Semi-Final (Tiger-Cats) 52–44
2012	2012	CFL	East	1st^	11	7	0	Lost East Final (Argonauts) 27–20
2013	2013	CFL	East	3rd	8	10	0	Lost East Semi-Final (Tiger-Cats) 19–16
2014	2014	CFL	East	2nd	9	9	0	Won East Semi-Final (Lions) 50–17; Lost East Final (Tiger-Cats) 40–24
2015	2015	CFL	East	4th	6	12	0	
2016	2016	CFL	East	3rd	7	11	0	
2017	2017	CFL	East	4th	3	15	0	
2018	2018	CFL	East	3rd	5	13	0	
2019	2019	CFL	East	2nd	10	8	0	Lost East Semi-Final (Eskimos) 37–29
2020	2020	CFL	East	Season cancelled due to the COVID-19 pandemic				
2021	2021	CFL	East	3rd	7	7	0	Lost East Semi-Final (Tiger-Cats) 23–12
2022	2022	CFL	East	2nd	9	9	0	Won East Semi-Final (Tiger-Cats) 28–17; Lost East Final (Argonauts) 34–27
2023	2023	CFL†	East*	2nd	11	7	0	Won East Semi-Final (Tiger-Cats) 27–12; Won East Final (Argonauts) 38–17; Won Grey Cup (Blue Bombers) 28–24
2024	2024	CFL	East	1st^	12	5	1	Lost East Final (Argonauts) 30–28
2025	2025	CFL	East*	2nd	10	8	0	Won East Semi-Final (Blue Bombers) 42–33; Won East Final (Tiger-Cats) 19–16; Lost Grey Cup (Roughriders) 25–17
2026	2026	CFL	East*	1st^	14	4	0	Won East Final (Blue Bombers) 33–23; Lost Grey Cup (Elks) 37–30
Regular season Totals (1946–2026)					563	537	22	
Playoff Totals (1946–2026)					42	37	0	
Grey Cup Totals (1946–2026)					8	13	0	
