= 2nd Grey Cup =

1910 Canadian Football championship game

Toronto Varsity Blues	Hamilton Tigers
(6–0)	(4–2)
16	7
Head coach: Harry Griffith	Head coach: Seppi DuMoulin
	1	2	3	4	Total
Toronto Varsity Blues	5	6	0	5	16
Hamilton Tigers	0	0	2	5	7
- Date: November 26, 1910
- Stadium: A.A.A. Grounds
- Location: Hamilton
- Attendance: 12,000

The 2nd Grey Cup was played on November 26, 1910, before 12,000 fans at A.A.A. Grounds at Hamilton.

The University of Toronto Varsity Blues defeated the Hamilton Tigers 16–7.

== Game summary ==
U. of Toronto Varsity Blues (16) - TDs, Red Dixon, Jack Maynard; cons., Maynard; singles, Hugh Gall (2), Dixon (2), Maynard.

Hamilton Tigers (7) - FG, Kid Smith; singles, Ben Simpson (3), Smith.

== Toronto Varsity Blues roster ==
=== Management ===
- President: G.A. Kingston
- Manager: J.B. McDonald
- Head Coach: Harry Griffith

=== Players ===
- H.G. Kennedy
- Lew Cory
- Bob Thompson
- Frank Park
- Pete German
- Bob Grass
- Jack Maynar
- P. Gardner
- Ewart "Reddy" Dixon
- Jack Lajoie
- Elloit Greene
- E. Murray Thomson
- Stan Clark
- H.M. Dawson
- Jim Bell
- A.V. Leonard
- Charlie Gage
- J.L. Carroll
