= List of Hamilton Tiger-Cats seasons =

List of Canadian football team seasons

This is a complete list of seasons competed by the Hamilton Tiger-Cats, a Canadian Football League team. The Hamilton Football Club was formed on November 3, 1869 and was first referred to as the Tigers in a game against the Toronto Argonauts on October 18, 1873, while also wearing black and gold for the first time. In 1941, during World War II, a new team, named the Hamilton Wildcats began playing in the Ontario Rugby Football Union after the Tigers suspended operations due to most of their players fighting in the war. After the Tigers rejoined the IRFU, the two teams were simultaneously competing for the Grey Cup. In 1950, the two clubs merged under the moniker Hamilton Tiger-Cats after it became apparent that both teams would not be able to compete financially in the same market.

Throughout their history, the Tiger-Cats have won eight Grey Cups and Hamilton franchises combined have won 15 Grey Cups.

Grey Cup Championships†	Division Championships*	Regular season championships^

League Season	Tiger-Cats Season	League	Division	Finish	Wins	Losses	Ties	Playoffs
1950	1950	IRFU	–	1st^	7	5	0	Lost IRFU Semi-Finals (Argonauts) 1–1 series (19–35 points)
1951	1951	IRFU	–	2nd	7	5	0	Won IRFU Semi-Finals (Argonauts) 1–1 series (31–28 points); Lost IRFU Finals (Rough Riders) 0–2 series (16–28 points)
1952	1952	IRFU	–	1st	9	2	1	Lost IRFU Finals (Argonauts) 1–2 series (45–40 points)
1953	1953	IRFU†*	–	2nd	8	6	0	Won IRFU Finals (Alouettes) 2–0 series (59–23 points); Won Grey Cup (Blue Bombers) 12–6†
1954	1954	IRFU	–	2nd	9	5	0	Lost IRFU Finals (Alouettes) 0–2 series (38–28 points)
1955	1955	IRFU	–	2nd	8	4	0	Lost IRFU Semi-Finals (Argonauts) 32–28
1956	1956	IRFU	–	2nd	7	7	0	Won IRFU Semi-Finals (Rough Riders) 46–21; Lost IRFU Finals (Alouettes) 0–2 series (78–62 points)
1957	1957	IRFU†*	–	1st^	10	4	0	Won East Finals (Alouettes) 2–0 series (56–11 points); Won Grey Cup (Blue Bombers) 32–7†
1958	1958	CFL	IRFU*	1st^	10	3	1	Won IRFU Finals (Rough Riders) 2–0 series (54–14 points); Lost Grey Cup (Blue Bombers) 35–28
1959	1959	CFL	IRFU*	1st^	10	4	0	Won East Finals (Rough Riders) 1–1 series (26–24 points); Lost Grey Cup (Blue Bombers) 21–7
1960	1960	CFL	IRFU	4th	4	10	0	
1961	1961	CFL	East*	1st^	10	4	0	Won East Finals (Argonauts) 1–1 series (55–27 points); Lost Grey Cup (Blue Bombers) 21–14 (OT)
1962	1962	CFL	East*	1st^	9	4	1	Won East Finals (Alouettes) 2–0 series (58–38 points); Lost Grey Cup (Blue Bombers) 28–27
1963	1963	CFL†	East*	1st^	10	4	0	Won East Finals (Rough Riders) 1–1 series (63–35 points); Won Grey Cup (Lions) 21–10†
1964	1964	CFL	East*	1st^	10	3	1	Won East Finals (Rough Riders) 1–1 series (39–38 points); Lost Grey Cup (Lions) 34–24
1965	1965	CFL†	East*	1st^	10	4	0	Won East Finals (Rough Riders) 2–0 series (35–20 points); Won Grey Cup (Blue Bombers) 22–16†
1966	1966	CFL	East	2nd	9	5	0	Won East Semi-Finals (Alouettes) 24–14; Lost East Finals (Rough Riders) 0–2 series (17–72 points)
1967	1967	CFL†	East*	1st^	10	4	0	Won East Finals (Rough Riders) 2–0 series (37–3 points); Won Grey Cup (Roughriders) 24–1†
1968	1968	CFL	East	3rd	6	7	1	Lost East Semi-Finals (Argonauts) 33–21
1969	1969	CFL	East	3rd	8	5	1	Lost East Semi-Finals (Argonauts) 15–9
1970	1970	CFL	East	1st^	8	5	1	Lost East Finals (Alouettes) 0–2 series (26–43 points)
1971	1971	CFL	East	2nd	7	7	0	Won East Semi-Final (Rough Riders) 23–4; Lost East Finals (Argonauts) 0–1–1 series (25–40 points)
1972	1972	CFL†	East*	1st^	11	3	0	Won East Finals (Rough Riders) 1–1 series (30–27 points); Won Grey Cup (Roughriders) 13–10†
1973	1973	CFL	East	4th	7	7	0	
1974	1974	CFL	East	3rd	7	9	0	Lost East Semi-Final (Rough Riders) 21–19
1975	1975	CFL	East	3rd	5	10	1	Lost East Semi-Final (Alouettes) 35–12
1976	1976	CFL	East	2nd	8	8	0	Won East Semi-Final (Alouettes) 23–0; Lost East Final (Rough Riders) 17–15
1977	1977	CFL	East	4th	5	11	0	
1978	1978	CFL	East	3rd	5	10	1	Lost East Semi-Final (Alouettes) 35–20
1979	1979	CFL	East	3rd	6	10	0	Lost East Semi-Final (Rough Riders) 29–26
1980	1980	CFL	East*	1st^	8	7	1	Won East Final (Alouettes) 24–13; Lost Grey Cup (Eskimos) 48–10
1981	1981	CFL	East	1st^	11	4	1	Lost East Final (Rough Riders) 17–13
1982	1982	CFL	East	2nd	8	7	1	Lost East Semi-Final (Rough Riders) 30–20
1983	1983	CFL	East	3rd	5	10	1	Won East Semi-Final (Rough Riders) 33–31; Lost East Final (Argonauts) 41–36
1984	1984	CFL	East*	2nd	6	9	1	Won East Semi-Final (Concordes) 17–11; Won East Final (Argonauts) 14–13 (OT); Lost Grey Cup (Blue Bombers) 47–17
1985	1985	CFL	East*	1st^	8	8	0	Won East Final (Concordes) 50–26; Lost Grey Cup (Lions) 37–24
1986	1986	CFL†	East*	2nd	9	8	1	Won East Finals (Argonauts) 1–1 series (59–56 points); Won Grey Cup (Eskimos) 39–15†
1987	1987	CFL	East	3rd	7	11	0	Lost East Semi-Final (Argonauts) 29–13
1988	1988	CFL	East	3rd	9	9	0	Lost East Semi-Final (Blue Bombers) 35–28
1989	1989	CFL	East*	1st^	12	6	0	Won East Final (Blue Bombers) 14–10; Lost Grey Cup (Roughriders) 43–40
1990	1990	CFL	East	4th	6	12	0	
1991	1991	CFL	East	4th	3	15	0	
1992	1992	CFL	East	2nd	11	7	0	Won East Semi-Final (Rough Riders) 29–28; Lost East Final (Blue Bombers) 59–11
1993	1993	CFL	East	2nd	6	12	0	Won East Semi-Final (Rough Riders) 21–10; Lost East Final (Blue Bombers) 20–19
1994	1994	CFL	East	5th	4	14	0	
1995	1995	CFL	North	4th	8	10	0	Lost North Semi-Final (Stampeders) 31–13
1996	1996	CFL	East	3rd	8	10	0	Lost East Semi-Final (Alouettes) 22–11
1997	1997	CFL	East	4th	2	16	0	
1998	1998	CFL	East*	1st^	12	5	1	Won East Final (Alouettes) 22–20; Lost Grey Cup (Stampeders) 26–24
1999	1999	CFL†	East*	2nd	11	7	0	Won East Semi-Final (Argonauts) 27–6; Won East Final (Alouettes) 27–26; Won Grey Cup (Stampeders) 32–21†
2000	2000	CFL	East	2nd	9	9	0	Lost East Semi-Final (Blue Bombers) 22–20
2001	2001	CFL	East	2nd	11	7	0	Won East Semi-Final (Alouettes) 24–12; Lost East Final (Blue Bombers) 28–13
2002	2002	CFL	East	3rd	7	11	0	
2003	2003	CFL	East	4th	1	17	0	
2004	2004	CFL	East	3rd	9	8	1	Lost East Semi-Final (Argonauts) 24–6
2005	2005	CFL	East	4th	5	13	0	
2006	2006	CFL	East	4th	4	14	0	
2007	2007	CFL	East	4th	3	15	0	
2008	2008	CFL	East	4th	3	15	0	
2009	2009	CFL	East	2nd	9	9	0	Lost East Semi-Final (Lions) 34–27 (OT)
2010	2010	CFL	East	2nd	9	9	0	Lost East Semi-Final (Argonauts) 16–13
2011	2011	CFL	East	3rd	8	10	0	Won East Semi-Final (Alouettes) 52–44 (OT); Lost East Final (Blue Bombers) 19–3
2012	2012	CFL	East	4th	6	12	0	
2013	2013	CFL	East*	2nd	10	8	0	Won East Semi-Final (Alouettes) 19–16 (OT); Won East Final (Argonauts) 36–24; Lost Grey Cup (Roughriders) 45–23
2014	2014	CFL	East*	1st^	9	9	0	Won East Final (Alouettes) 40–24; Lost Grey Cup (Stampeders) 20–16
2015	2015	CFL	East	2nd	10	8	0	Won East Semi-Final (Argonauts) 25–22; Lost East Final (Redblacks) 35–28
2016	2016	CFL	East	2nd	7	11	0	Lost East Semi-Final (Eskimos) 24–21
2017	2017	CFL	East	3rd	6	12	0	
2018	2018	CFL	East	2nd	8	10	0	Won East Semi-Final (Lions) 48–8; Lost East Final (Redblacks) 46–27
2019	2019	CFL	East*	1st^	15	3	0	Won East Final (Eskimos) 36–16; Lost Grey Cup (Blue Bombers) 33–12
2020	2020	CFL	East	Season cancelled due to the COVID-19 pandemic				
2021	2021	CFL	East*	2nd	8	6	0	Won East Semi-Final (Alouettes) 23–12; Won East Final (Argonauts) 27–19; Lost Grey Cup (Blue Bombers) 33–25 (OT)
2022	2022	CFL	East	3rd	8	10	0	Lost East Semi-Final (Alouettes) 28–17
2023	2023	CFL	East	3rd	8	10	0	Lost East Semi-Final (Alouettes) 27–12
2024	2024	CFL	East	4th	7	11	0	
2025	2025	CFL	East	1st^	11	7	0	Lost East Final (Alouettes) 19–16
2026	2026	CFL	East	3rd	6	12	0	
Regular season Totals (1950–2026)					591	628	17	
Playoff Totals (1950–2026)					46	50	1	
Grey Cup Totals (1950–2026)					8	14		
