= 1908 Dominion Championship =

Hamilton Tigers	Toronto Varsity
(5–1)	(5–1)
21	17
Head coach: George Ballard	Head coach: Harry Griffith
	1	2	3	4	Total
Hamilton Tigers	6	13	0	2	21
Toronto Varsity	4	5	2	6	17
- Date: November 28, 1908
- Stadium: Rosedale Field
- Location: Rosedale, Toronto
- Referee: W.B. Hendry
- Attendance: 8,050

The 1908 Dominion Championship was a Canadian football game that was played on November 28, 1908, at the Rosedale Field in Toronto, Ontario, that determined the Senior Rugby Football champion of Canada for the 1908 season. The Interprovincial Rugby Football Union (IRFU) champion Hamilton Tigers defeated the Canadian Intercollegiate Rugby Football Union (CIRFU) champion Toronto Varsity 21–17 to claim their second Dominion Championship. This was the last Dominion Championship played before the establishment of the Grey Cup trophy for the 1909 Dominion Championship game.

== Game recap ==
The Tigers were playing without star player Ben Simpson who was injured by a kick to the chest in the IRFU Playoff against the Ottawa Rough Riders two weeks earlier. Despite his absence, the Tigers started strong and led by a score of 19 to 4 in the second quarter. However, Varsity scored a converted try to end the half, had a strong showing in the second half, and trimmed the lead to two, scoring 13 straight points. The comeback attempt fell short as Hamilton had two rouges to end the game and the final score was 21–17.
