= List of Ottawa Redblacks seasons =

List of Canadian football team seasons

This article is a complete list of seasons completed by the Ottawa Redblacks. The Redblacks have played in the Canadian Football League (CFL) since 2014.

Grey Cup Championships	East Division Championships	Regular season Championships

League season	Club season	League	Division	Finish	Wins	Losses	Ties	Playoffs
2014	2014	CFL	East	4th	2	16	0	
2015	2015	CFL	East	1st	12	6	0	Won East Final (Tiger-Cats) 35–28; Lost Grey Cup (Eskimos) 26–20
2016	2016	CFL	East	1st	8	9	1	Won East Final (Eskimos) 35–23; Won Grey Cup (Stampeders) 39–33
2017	2017	CFL	East	2nd	8	9	1	Lost East Semi-Final (Roughriders) 31–20
2018	2018	CFL	East	1st	11	7	0	Won East Final (Tiger-Cats) 46–27; Lost Grey Cup (Stampeders) 27–16
2019	2019	CFL	East	4th	3	15	0	
2020	2020	CFL	East	Season cancelled due to COVID-19 pandemic				
2021	2021	CFL	East	4th	3	11	0	
2022	2022	CFL	East	4th	4	14	0	
2023	2023	CFL	East	4th	4	14	0	
2024	2024	CFL	East	3rd	9	8	1	Lost East Semi-Final (Argonauts) 58–38
2025	2025	CFL	East	4th	4	14	0	
2026	2026	CFL	East	4th	1	17	0	
Regular season total (2014–2026)					68	140	3	
Playoff total (2014–2026)					3	2	0	
Grey Cup total (2014–2026)					1	2	0	
