= Delta Secondary School (Hamilton, Ontario) =

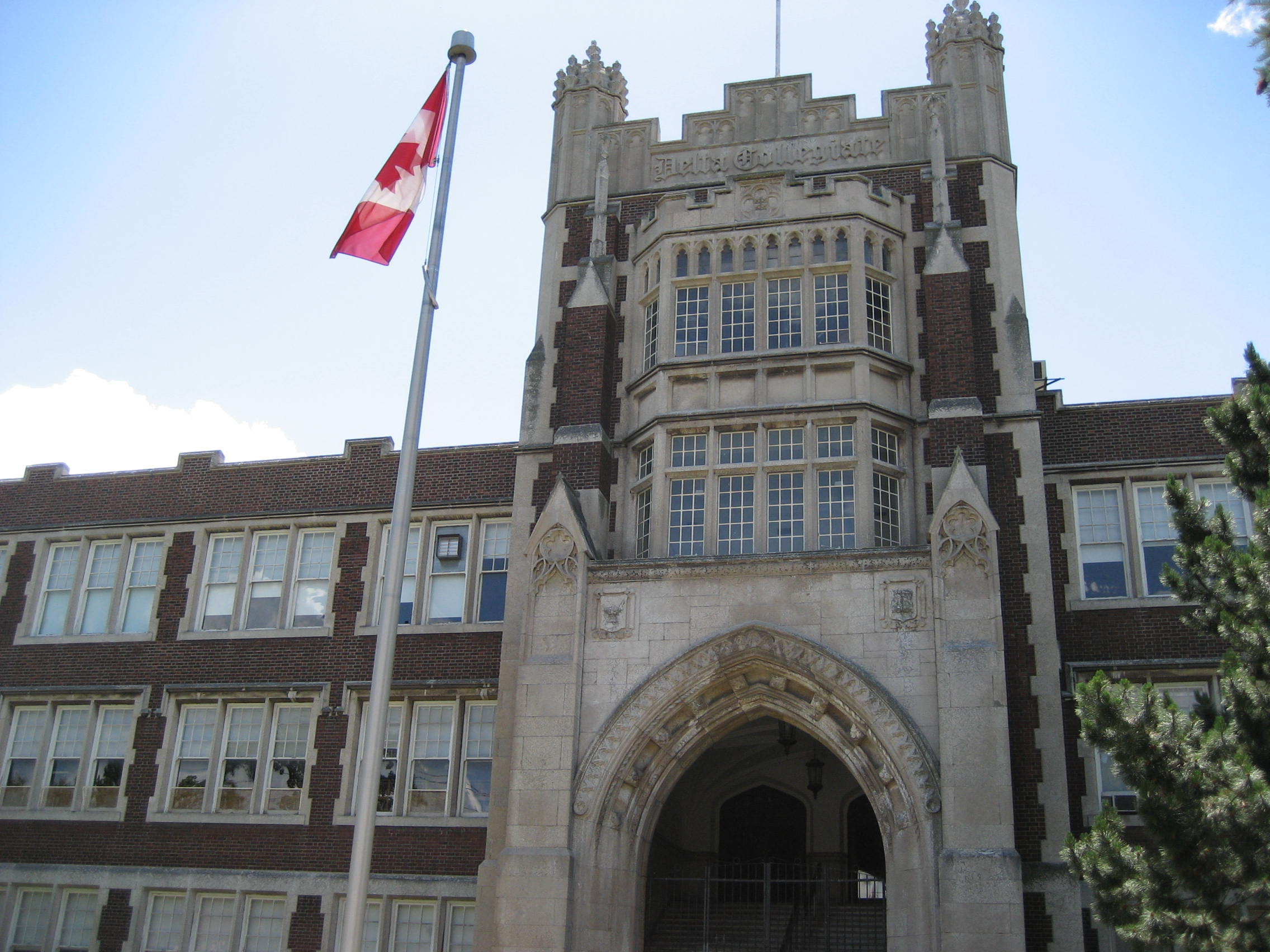
- Delta Secondary School

Location
- 1284 Main Street East; Hamilton, Ontario; Canada; 43.240467°N 79.814179°W

Information
- School type: High school
- Founded: 1925
- Closed: 2019
- School board: Hamilton-Wentworth District School Board
- Grades: 9-12
- Enrollment: 841 to 900
- Mascot: Red Raiders
- Website: www.hwdsb.on.ca/delta

Delta Secondary School was a Canadian high school in Hamilton, Ontario. Built in 1925, it was one of the oldest high schools in the city. It was located on 1284 Main Street East, and is connected to the Delta Honeybears Daycare. The school had an estimated enrollment of 841 students and is part of the Hamilton-Wentworth District School Board. The school was permanently closed in 2019.

== History ==
The Greek aphorism "GNOTHI SE", meaning "know thyself", is Delta's motto and was chosen by Mr. Walter Clarke, the school's first Latin teacher. In 1919, projected enrollment predicted overcrowding at Central Collegiate; hence, on July 13, 1922, the debate concerning the second location of the second collegiate ended with the approval of an east-end site. In the years before construction, the Board of Education referred to the new collegiate as the "East-end Collegiate" but later adopted the name "Delta High School" as the "Delta" was well known to Hamiltonians as the land area created by the crossing of the two major arteries, King and Main Streets. On July 5, 1923, Ben Simpson accepted the position of Delta's first principal and in September 1923, under the tutelage of the 5 original staff members, the first Delta students began their classes in Ballard Elementary School. Delta's doors were opened in September 1924, with 15 additional staff members and almost 700 students. In November of the same year, Delta was declared formally open by G. Howard Ferguson, Premier of Ontario and Minister of Education. Experts in construction and architecture pronounced Delta "the finest school in the Dominion of Canada" and following Ministry inspection, the High School was raised to the status of a Collegiate Institute.

Founded in 1925, Delta Secondary School's first principal was Mr. Ben Simpson of the Hamilton Collegiate Institute and a renowned Hamilton Tiger football player. The school was one of the first schools in Hamilton to offer commercial classes in writing, book-keeping, business forms, commercial law, and phonography.

Delta was scheduled to be closed in June 2015. Efforts to create an alternative solution to closing were made given the age of the building, the history, and the vital role that the school plays in the lives of students and the neighbourhood. The school was then closed after the 2018-2019 school year.

== Ontario Youth Apprenticeship Program ==
Delta Secondary School took part in the Ontario Youth Apprenticeship Program, funded by the Government of Ontario. The Ontario Youth Apprenticeship Program (OYAP) is a School to Work program that opens the door for students to explore and work in apprenticeship occupations starting in Grade 11 or Grade 12 through the Cooperative Education program. The program gives students the opportunity to become registered apprentices and work towards becoming certified journey-persons in a skilled trade while completing their secondary school diplomas.

The goals of OYAP are:

- To provide students with the opportunity to start training in a skilled trade while completing the requirements for an Ontario Secondary School Diploma
- To enable students to make the school to work transition by direct entry into apprenticeship training
- To provide employers with the opportunity to train the skilled workers they require
- To provide a viable solution to address the problem of skilled tradespeople shortages in general, and specifically the lack of young people joining the trades.

== See also ==
- List of high schools in Ontario
