= Hamilton Amateur Athletic Association Grounds =

Sports venue in Hamilton, Ontario

Coordinates: 43.253455°N 79.883512°W

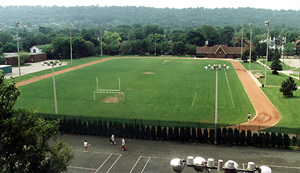
HAAA Grounds

The Hamilton Amateur Athletic Association Grounds (also known as Hamilton AAA Grounds or HAAA) is a park located on the north side of Charlton Avenue West, between Locke Street South and Queen Street South, in Hamilton, Ontario, Canada. The park served as home to the Hamilton Tigers from 1872 to 1949. Prior to 1949, the grounds hosted home games for McMaster Marauders football.

In 1950, the Tigers amalgamated with the Hamilton Wildcats to create the Hamilton Tiger-Cats. The new team became the permanent tenants of Civic Stadium (later Ivor Wynne Stadium), and played their home games there until 2012. The Tiger-Cats joined the Canadian Football League as an inaugural member in 1958. A plaque outlining much of the grounds' history (including information on the Grey Cup games played there) is located next to the main entrance on Charlton.

The HAAA Grounds will be closed to the public during construction of park improvements beginning in Spring 2026. The project includes a new 200 m track, mini soccer field, basketball court, bouldering, junior and senior play structures, spray pad, and sun shelter.

== Grey Cup at HAAA Grounds ==
Grey Cup	Date	Champion	Score	Loser	Attendance
2nd Grey Cup	26 November 1910	Toronto Varsity Blues	16–7	Hamilton Tigers	12,000
4th Grey Cup	30 November 1912	Hamilton Alerts	11–4	Toronto Argonauts	5,337
5th Grey Cup	29 November 1913	Hamilton Tigers	44–2	Toronto Parkdale Canoe Club	2,100
16th Grey Cup	1 December 1928	Hamilton Tigers	30–0	Regina Roughriders	4,767
17th Grey Cup	30 November 1929	Hamilton Tigers	14–3	Regina Roughriders	1,906
20th Grey Cup	3 December 1932	Hamilton Tigers	25–6	Regina Roughriders	4,806
23rd Grey Cup	7 December 1935	Winnipeg 'Pegs	18–12	Hamilton Tigers	6,405
