= 1908 in Canadian football =

The 1908 Canadian football season was the 17th season of organized play since the Canadian Rugby Union (CRU) was founded in 1892 and the 26th season since the creation of the Ontario Rugby Football Union (ORFU) and the Quebec Rugby Football Union (QRFU) in 1883. The season concluded with the Hamilton Tigers defeating the Toronto University team in the 1908 Dominion Championship game.

== Canadian football news in 1908 ==
The Calgary Rugby Foot-ball Club was re-organized as the Tigers on August 27 and adopted yellow and black as the team colours.

The Calgary Rugby Football Union was formed on September 29 in the offices of the Sovereign Life Insurance Company.

The Caledonia and Hillhurst Football Clubs played for the championship of the Central Alberta Rugby Football League on September 4.

The Edmonton Rugby Foot-ball Club was renamed the Esquimoux on October 16.

Goals from the field were reduced to three points by the CRU.

== Regular season ==
=== Final regular season standings ===
Note: GP = Games played, W = Wins, L = Losses, T = Ties, PF = Points for, PA = Points against, Pts = Points

**Interprovincial Rugby Football Union**
Team	GP	W	L	T	PF	PA	Pts
**Ottawa Rough Riders**	6	5	1	0	114	41	10
**Hamilton Tigers**	6	5	1	0	131	42	10
Montreal Football Club	6	1	5	0	49	101	2
Toronto Argonauts	6	1	5	0	50	160	2

Ontario Rugby Football Union
Team	GP	W	L	T	PF	PA	Pts
**Toronto Amateur Athletic Club**	2	2	0	0	37	6	4
Peterboro	2	0	2	0	6	37	0

**Intercollegiate Rugby Football Union**
Team	GP	W	L	T	PF	PA	Pts
**Queen's**	6	5	1	0	90	50	10
**Toronto**	6	5	1	0	112	54	10
McGill	6	1	5	0	24	101	2
Ottawa	6	1	5	0	66	87	2

- Bold text means that they had clinched the playoffs.

Manitoba Rugby Football Union
Team	GP	W	L	T	PF	PA	Pts
St.John's Rugby Football Club	5	3	1	1	64	43	7
Winnipeg Rowing Club	5	1	3	1	43	64	3

Saskatchewan Rugby Football League
Team	GP	W	L	T	PF	PA	Pts
Regina YMCA	2	2	0	0	16	12	4
Regina Civil Service	2	0	2	0	12	16	0
Moose Jaw Tigers							

Calgary Rugby Football Union
Team	GP	W	L	T	PF	PA	Pts
Calgary Tigers	4	3	1	0	87	37	6
Calgary YMCA	4	3	1	0	93	40	6
Hillhurst Hornets	4	0	4	0	30	123	0

== League Champions ==
Football union	League Champion
IRFU	Hamilton Tigers
CIRFU	University of Toronto
ORFU	Toronto Amateur Athletic Club
MRFU	St.John's Rugby Football Club
ARFL	Edmonton Esquimaux
CRFU	Calgary Tigers
SRFL	Regina YMCA

== Playoffs ==
=== Saskatchewan Rugby Football League final ===
SRFL Finals
Date	Away	Home
October 31	Moose Jaw Tigers 0	Regina YMCA 6
November 9	Regina YMCA 6	Moose Jaw Tigers 7

- Regina wins SRFL championship total points series: 12-7

=== Calgary Rugby Football Union Final ===
November 28 CRFU Playoff: Calgary, Alberta
Calgary Tigers 6	Calgary YMCA 0

=== Alberta Rugby Football League Playoffs ===
ARFL Finals Games 1 & 2
Date	Away	Home
November 9	Edmonton Esquimaux 7	Calgary Tigers 1
November 21	Calgary Tigers 2	Edmonton Esquimaux 11

- Edmonton wins the total-point series 18-3.

=== IRFU Final ===
November 14 IRFU Playoff: Kingston, Ontario
Hamilton Tigers 11	Ottawa Rough Riders 9

- Hamilton advances to the East Semi-Final.

=== CIRFU Final ===
November 21 1908 Yates Cup Game: Varsity Oval - Ottawa, Ontario
Toronto University 12	Queen's University 0

- Toronto advances to the Dominion Championship.

=== Dominion Semi-Final ===
November 21 Dominion Semi-Final: Cricket Grounds - Hamilton, Ontario
Hamilton Tigers 31	Toronto Amateur Athletic Club 8

- Hamilton advances to the Dominion Championship.

== Dominion Championship ==
November 28 1908 Dominion Championship Game: Rosedale Field - Toronto, Ontario
Hamilton Tigers 21	Toronto Varsity 17
Hamilton Tigers - 1908 Dominion Champions
