= 5th Grey Cup =

1913 Canadian Football championship game

Toronto Parkdale Canoe Club	Hamilton Tigers
	(5–1)
2	44
Head coach: Eddie Livingstone	Head coach: Liz Marriott
	1	2	3	4	Total
Toronto Parkdale Canoe Club	2	0	0	0	2
Hamilton Tigers	7	14	0	23	44
- Date: November 29, 1913
- Stadium: A.A.A. Grounds
- Location: Hamilton
- Attendance: 2,100

The 5th Grey Cup was played on November 29, 1913, before 2,100 fans at A.A.A. Grounds at Hamilton.

The Hamilton Tigers defeated the Toronto Parkdale Canoe Club 44–2.

== Notable facts ==
- The 44–2 score stands as the second-largest margin of victory in a Grey Cup game.
- It was the final time Parkdale advanced to the Grey Cup.
