= Toronto Amateur Athletic Club =

- Established: 1908; 117 years ago
- Folded: 1911; 114 years ago
- Based in: Toronto, Ontario, Canada
- Home stadium: Rosedale Field
- League: Ontario Rugby Football Union
- League titles: 2 (1908, 1910)

The Toronto Amateur Athletic Club (TAAC) or Torontos was an athletics organization in Toronto, Ontario, Canada. The club fielded teams in various sports, including ice hockey and rugby football. The Toronto Amateur Athletic Club also had a gymnasium on Ossington Avenue and a boxing club.

== History ==
The Toronto Athletic Club was founded in the 1800s as an unincorporated association. In the 1882 directory, its office is at 185 Yonge Street. In 1890, its office was at 25 King Street West, and its grounds were at 10 Elm Avenue, then north-east of the city, at the intersection of Elm and Sherbourne Street. By 1892, the Club had incorporated and had moved to 149 College Street, a building designed by architect E. J. Lennox, and reputedly holding the first indoor swimming pool, as well as a gymnasium and billiards room. The Club ran into financial difficulties around 1898, ceased operations and sold off the building. The contents were auctioned off in 1900. From the demise of the Athletic Club, the Toronto Amateur Athletic Club was formed.

== Football team ==
The Toronto Amateur Athletic Club's football club played in the Ontario Rugby Football Union (ORFU) from 1908 to 1911. The team won the ORFU championship in 1908 and 1910. After the 1911 the club became the Toronto Rowing and Athletic Association from 1912 to 1921.

=== ORFU season-by-season ===
Season	G	W	L	T	PF	PA	Pts	Finish	Playoffs
1908	2	2	0	0	37	6	4	1st	won ORFU championship, lost eastern final to Hamilton Tigers, 31-8
1909	4	3	1	0	51	30	6	1st	lost ORFU playoff to Toronto Parkdale, 8-3
1910	6	5	1	0	78	46	10	1st	won ORFU championship, lost semi final to Toronto Varsity Blues, 22-3
1911	5	3	2	0	102	40	6	2nd	
TOTALS	17	13	4	0	268	122	26		2 ORFU championships

== Ice hockey ==
The club iced teams in the junior, senior and intermediate divisions of the Ontario Hockey Association (OHA). A junior team was first fielded in 1894. An ice hockey team was first selected in 1888 from the club's members, and practiced at the Caledonian Rink.

The club also set up a hockey team at Excelsior Rink on College Street for the Interprovincial Amateur Hockey Union.
