= Ben Simpson =

Canadian football player (1878–1964)

Profile
- Positions: Running back Placekicker

Personal information
- Born: May 9, 1878; Peterborough, Ontario, Canada
- Died: October 20, 1964 (aged 86); Hamilton, Ontario, Canada

Career information
- College: Queen's University

Career history
- 1899–1903: Queen's University
- 1904–1910: Hamilton Tigers
- Canadian Football Hall of Fame (Class of 1963)

Benjamin L. Simpson (September 5, 1878 – October 20, 1964) was a star football player in the Interprovincial Rugby Football Union (Big Four) for seven seasons for the Hamilton Tigers. He was inducted into the Canadian Football Hall of Fame in 1963 and into the Canada's Sports Hall of Fame in 1975.
