= East Division (CFL) =

Regional division of the Canadian Football League

- Formerly: Interprovincial Rugby Football Union (1907–1959); Eastern Football Conference (1960–1980)
- League: Canadian Football League
- Sport: Canadian football
- Founded: 1907; 119 years ago
- No. of teams: 4
- Most recent champion: Montreal Alouettes (17th title)
- Most titles: Toronto Argonauts (24 titles)

The East Division is one of the two regional divisions of the Canadian Football League, its counterpart being the West Division. Although the CFL was not founded until 1958, the East Division and its clubs are descended from earlier leagues.

The four teams in the division are the Toronto Argonauts, Hamilton Tiger-Cats, Montreal Alouettes, and Ottawa Redblacks. Several now-defunct teams have also played in the East Division including two teams from the United States and a large number of teams that have played in Hamilton, Montreal, and Ottawa prior to the current teams from those cities. Additionally, current West Division team, the Winnipeg Blue Bombers have, in the past, spent a number of seasons in the East over three separate stints.

== History ==
=== Pre–1907 ===
The first organized football club in Canada was the Hamilton Foot Ball Club, a predecessor of the Hamilton Tiger-Cats, in 1869. This was followed by the formation of the Montreal Foot Ball Club in 1872, the Toronto Argonaut Football Club in 1873 and the Ottawa Football Club (the future Ottawa Rough Riders) in 1876.

The first organized competitions were formed in 1883, when the Ontario Rugby Football Union (ORFU) and the Quebec Rugby Football Union (QRFU) were founded. At the time the sport was generally called rugby union or rugby football because its rules were similar to rugby union's, although this would change drastically in the coming decades. The following year, the two provincial unions would form the Canadian Rugby Football Union (CRFU), with Montreal winning the first national championship later that year. The CRFU collapsed before the decade was out, but was re-organized as the Canadian Rugby Union (CRU) in 1891, with Osgoode Hall winning the first CRU championship the following year.

The turn of the 20th century was marked by fundamental changes in the rules of the game. The ORFU was the first competition to adopt the Burnside Rules, which were to revolutionize the Canadian game. The QRFU and CRU initially resisted the changes, but by 1906 the Burnside Rules were in force throughout Ontario and Quebec. Although substantial changes (such as forward passing) were still to come, modern Canadian football would ultimately evolve from John Thrift Meldrum Burnside's code.

W. A. Hewitt was vice-president of the ORFU, and represented the Toronto Argonauts. He sought for ORFU to have uniform rules of play with the CRU, with a preference to use the snap-back system of play used in Ontario. In December 1906, The Gazette reported that a proposal originated from Ottawa for the ORFU and the QRFU to merge, which would allow for higher calibre of play and create rivalries. Hewitt helped organize the meeting which established the IRFU in 1907.

=== Interprovincial Rugby Football Union (1907–1959) ===
In 1907, in a meeting organized by Hewitt, the ORFU's Hamilton Tigers and Toronto Argonauts joined with the QRFU's Montreal Foot Ball Club and Ottawa Rough Riders (Ottawa had been moving back and forth between the two unions over the past few years) to form an elite competition, the Interprovincial Rugby Football Union (more commonly known as the "Big Four"). Montreal won the first championship that year, taking home the James Dixon Trophy. In 1909 Lord Grey, the governor general of Canada, donated a trophy to be awarded to the CRU champion. The trophy, which became known as the Grey Cup, was not won by an IRFU club until the Hamilton Tigers captured the trophy in 1913. Following the 1915 season, the IRFU suspended competition because of World War I, and did not fully resume until 1920.

From 1925 until 1953, IRFU teams dominated Canadian football, winning 18 of the 26 Grey Cups its clubs contested in that timespan (the IRFU suspended operations from 1942 through 1944 because of World War II). During this period, the calibre of play in the IRFU was recognized as being on par with any league in North America. The Big Four attracted considerable interest in the United States and even had its games televised by the National Broadcasting Company for a time during the 1950s (in fact, these games were more widely available than their NFL counterparts). This interest eventually declined as the National Football League gained prominence and the American Football League rose in popularity. During this time, the IRFU became increasingly professionalized. However, in order to keep up the pretense of amateurism, players were usually paid under the table.

By the mid-1950s, the Big Four had dropped all pretense of amateurism, and it was clear that it was a far higher calibre competition than the ORFU (the Quebec union had faded from the scene in the early part of the century), the only purely amateur union still competing for the Grey Cup. Moreover, the Western Interprovincial Football Union rapidly gained strength after it was formed in 1936, and by the late 1940s its level of play was on the same level as that of the IRFU. The WIFU's champion had faced the Big Four's champion in the Grey Cup final every season since 1945, and it proved capable of winning the Grey Cup on a regular basis during this decade. Following the 1954 season, the ORFU finally stopped challenging for the Grey Cup, thus making the game a contest between the champions of the IRFU in the East and the WIFU in the West. Although it was another four years before the amateurs were formally locked out of Grey Cup play, this marks the start of the modern era of Canadian football.

In 1956, the Big Four and WIFU agreed to form the Canadian Football Council. In 1958, the CFC withdrew from the CRU and renamed itself the Canadian Football League. The new league assumed control of the Grey Cup, though it had been the de facto professional championship for four years before then.

=== Eastern Football Conference (1960–1980) ===
The IRFU changed its name to the Eastern Football Conference in 1960. In 1961, the EFC agreed to a partial interlocking schedule with what was known by then as the Western Football Conference. Although the EFC was part of the CFL, its merger with the WFC was only a partial merger for the next two decades. During this time, the conferences maintained considerable autonomy, much like Major League Baseball's two leagues operated during the 20th century. For example, the East had a different playoff format until 1973 and a shorter schedule until 1974. During this time, attendances increased substantially for most clubs and television revenue gained prominence and importance. By the 1980s, however, rising player salaries had caused considerable financial losses for some teams. In an effort to bolster the league's stability, the CFL decided to proceed with a complete merger of the two regional conferences.

=== East Division (1981–1994, 1996–present) ===
In 1981, the CFL's two conferences agreed to a full merger and a full interlocking schedule. Although the EFC has carried on since that time as the CFL's East Division, full authority was now vested within the CFL. The decision to create a full interlocking schedule meant that the teams were playing fewer divisional games, consequently the league decided to add two extra divisional games per team, thus extending the schedule to 18 games per team starting in 1986.

The East Division has undergone major changes since the dissolution of the EFC. Following the 1981 season the Montreal Alouettes folded. They were refounded in time for the 1982 season as the Montreal Concordes. The new owners restored the Alouettes name in 1986, but this franchise folded shortly before the start of the 1987 regular season. Consequently, the Winnipeg Blue Bombers, the easternmost team in the West Division, were transferred to the East Division to keep the divisions equal in size. This led to the first "all-Western" Grey Cup in 1988 when the Blue Bombers won the East Division championship for the first time.

In 1994, the CFL decided to expand further into the United States after admitting the Sacramento Gold Miners as the first U.S. team a year earlier. This led to the addition of the two American-based teams in the East, the Shreveport Pirates and a team in Baltimore that would eventually be called the Stallions after the NFL successfully prevented the team from using the name "Colts". Baltimore would go on to win the East Division championship in 1994. For the 1995 season, all eight Canadian teams competed in the North Division, while the five American teams formed the South Division.

Prior to the 1996 season however, all of the American clubs disbanded. The owner of one, the Grey Cup champion Stallions, moved his organization to Montreal as the third and current incarnation of the Alouettes. However, while the Alouettes are now officially reckoned as having suspended operations from 1987 to 1995, they do not acknowledge their past as the Stallions. The pre-1987 divisional alignment was restored, only to see Winnipeg return to the East after one season when the Ottawa Rough Riders folded. The Blue Bombers returned to the West in 2002 after the Ottawa Renegades commenced play in the nation's capital. With the suspension of the Renegades in 2006, the Blue Bombers again were transferred to the East Division. With the East Division Ottawa Redblacks beginning play in 2014, the Blue Bombers moved back to the West Division again.

=== Grey Cup record ===
Prior to 1954, Eastern clubs dominated the Grey Cup. For most of the modern era, however, the West has generally been on an equal footing and in recent decades has often dominated the East in the regular season. From 1954 to 2016, the East won 27 Grey Cups and lost 35. This is not counting the 1995 season. Two of the East's Grey Cup wins were by the Blue Bombers, who have played in the West for most of their history.

== Playoff format ==
Since 1955, three teams have competed in the East playoffs in most seasons. Only the top two teams qualified for the post-season in 1986 when an earlier form of the cross-over rule was in force, while four teams qualified in 1994 when there were six teams. In 1997, the present cross-over rule was implemented, allowing the fourth place team from one division to take the play-off place of the third place team in the other division, should the fourth place team earn a better record. From 1997 to 2016, the fourth place team in the West has taken advantage of the cross-over rule nine times, including four times when there were equal teams in the divisions. However, it was not until 2008 that a West team (Edmonton) advanced to the East Final, and only four other teams (the 2009 BC Lions, 2016 Eskimos, 2017 Saskatchewan Roughriders and 2019 Eskimos) have won a game since. Neither crossover team won more than one playoff game.

Since the implementation of the crossover rule, the closest an East team has come to earning a cross-over berth in the West playoffs was in 2001 when fourth place Toronto finished one point behind third place BC.

== Current teams ==
- Toronto Argonauts (formed 1873, joined 1907)
- Hamilton Tiger-Cats (formed 1950 as a result of the merger between the Hamilton Tigers and Hamilton Wildcats)
- Montreal Alouettes (formed 1946, renamed Concordes in 1982, renamed Alouettes in 1986, suspended operations in 1987, returned in 1996)
- Ottawa Redblacks (formed 2010, began play 2014)

== Former teams ==
- Hamilton Tigers (formed in 1869, joined in 1907, merged with the Hamilton Wildcats to form the Hamilton Tiger-Cats in 1950)
- Montreal Football Club (formed in 1872, joined in 1907, disbanded in 1915)
- Ottawa Rough Riders (formed in 1876, joined in 1907, disbanded in 1996)
- Montreal AAA Winged Wheelers (joined in 1919, disbanded in 1935)
- Montreal Indians/Cubs/Royals/Bulldogs (Indians joined in 1936, replaced by Cubs in 1938, replaced by Royals in 1939, disbanded in 1941)
- Hamilton Wildcats (formed in 1941, joined in 1948, merged with the Hamilton Tigers to form the Hamilton Tiger-Cats in 1950)
- Montreal Hornets (1945)
- Baltimore Stallions (formed in 1994, played in South Division in 1995; relocated to Montreal in 1996)
- Shreveport Pirates (formed in 1994, played in South Division in 1995; disbanded)
- Ottawa Renegades (formed in 2002, suspended in 2006)
- Winnipeg Blue Bombers (formed in 1930, played in the East Division 1987–1994, 1997–2001, and 2006–2013)

== List of Eastern champions ==
=== IRFU champions ===
Year	Champion	Runner-up
1907	Montreal Football Club	
1908	Hamilton Tigers	
1909	Ottawa Rough Riders	
1910	Hamilton Tigers	
1911	Toronto Argonauts	
1912	Toronto Argonauts	
1913	Hamilton Tigers	
1914	Toronto Argonauts	
1915	Hamilton Tigers	
1916	No season: World War I	
1917	No season: World War I	
1918	No season: World War I	
1919	Montreal AAA Winged Wheelers	
1920	Toronto Argonauts	
1921	Toronto Argonauts	
1922	Toronto Argonauts	
1923	Hamilton Tigers	
1924	Hamilton Tigers	
1925	Ottawa Senators	
1926	Ottawa Senators	
1927	Hamilton Tigers	
1928	Hamilton Tigers	
1929	Hamilton Tigers	
1930	Hamilton Tigers	
1931	Montreal AAA Winged Wheelers	
1932	Hamilton Tigers	
1933	Toronto Argonauts	Montreal AAA Winged Wheelers
1934	Hamilton Tigers	
1935	Hamilton Tigers	
1936	Ottawa Rough Riders	Toronto Argonauts
1937	Toronto Argonauts	Ottawa Rough Riders
1938	Toronto Argonauts	Ottawa Rough Riders
1939	Ottawa Rough Riders	Toronto Argonauts
1940	Ottawa Rough Riders	Toronto Argonauts
1941	Ottawa Rough Riders (Note: The Eastern Rugby Football Union was formed for one season in 1941 when the IRFU decided to suspend operations during World War II.)	Toronto Argonauts
1942	No season: World War II	
1943	No season: World War II	
1944	No season: World War II	
1945	Toronto Argonauts	Ottawa Rough Riders
1946	Toronto Argonauts	Montreal Alouettes
1947	Toronto Argonauts	Ottawa Rough Riders
1948	Ottawa Rough Riders	Montreal Alouettes
1949	Montreal Alouettes	Ottawa Rough Riders
1950	Toronto Argonauts	Hamilton Tiger-Cats
1951	Ottawa Rough Riders	Hamilton Tiger-Cats
1952	Toronto Argonauts	Hamilton Tiger-Cats
1953	Hamilton Tiger-Cats	Toronto Argonauts
1954	Montreal Alouettes	Hamilton Tiger-Cats
1955	Montreal Alouettes	Toronto Argonauts
1956	Montreal Alouettes	Hamilton Tiger-Cats
1957	Hamilton Tiger-Cats	Montreal Alouettes
1958	Hamilton Tiger-Cats	Ottawa Rough Riders
1959	Hamilton Tiger-Cats	Ottawa Rough Riders

=== Champions of the Eastern Football Conference ===
Year	Champion	Runner-up
1960	Ottawa Rough Riders	Montreal Alouettes
1961	Hamilton Tiger-Cats	Toronto Argonauts
1962	Hamilton Tiger-Cats	Montreal Alouettes
1963	Hamilton Tiger-Cats	Ottawa Rough Riders
1964	Hamilton Tiger-Cats	Ottawa Rough Riders
1965	Hamilton Tiger-Cats	Ottawa Rough Riders
1966	Ottawa Rough Riders	Hamilton Tiger-Cats
1967	Hamilton Tiger-Cats	Ottawa Rough Riders
1968	Ottawa Rough Riders	Toronto Argonauts
1969	Ottawa Rough Riders	Toronto Argonauts
1970	Montreal Alouettes	Hamilton Tiger-Cats
1971	Toronto Argonauts	Hamilton Tiger-Cats
1972	Hamilton Tiger-Cats	Ottawa Rough Riders
1973	Ottawa Rough Riders	Montreal Alouettes
1974	Montreal Alouettes	Ottawa Rough Riders
1975	Montreal Alouettes	Ottawa Rough Riders
1976	Ottawa Rough Riders	Hamilton Tiger-Cats
1977	Montreal Alouettes	Ottawa Rough Riders
1978	Montreal Alouettes	Ottawa Rough Riders
1979	Montreal Alouettes	Ottawa Rough Riders
1980	Hamilton Tiger-Cats	Montreal Alouettes

=== Champions of the East Division ===
Year	Champion	Runner-up
1981	Ottawa Rough Riders	Hamilton Tiger-Cats
1982	Toronto Argonauts	Ottawa Rough Riders
1983	Toronto Argonauts	Hamilton Tiger-Cats
1984	Hamilton Tiger-Cats	Toronto Argonauts
1985	Hamilton Tiger-Cats	Montreal Concordes
1986	Hamilton Tiger-Cats	Toronto Argonauts
1987	Toronto Argonauts	Winnipeg Blue Bombers
1988	Winnipeg Blue Bombers	Toronto Argonauts
1989	Hamilton Tiger-Cats	Winnipeg Blue Bombers
1990	Winnipeg Blue Bombers	Toronto Argonauts
1991	Toronto Argonauts	Winnipeg Blue Bombers
1992	Winnipeg Blue Bombers	Hamilton Tiger-Cats
1993	Winnipeg Blue Bombers	Hamilton Tiger-Cats
1994	Baltimore CFLers	Winnipeg Blue Bombers
1995	Baltimore Stallions (Note: In 1995, Canadian teams competed in the North Division and American teams in the South Division. The Baltimore Stallions won the South Division.)	San Antonio Texans
1996	Toronto Argonauts	Montreal Alouettes
1997	Toronto Argonauts	Montreal Alouettes
1998	Hamilton Tiger-Cats	Montreal Alouettes
1999	Hamilton Tiger-Cats	Montreal Alouettes
2000	Montreal Alouettes	Winnipeg Blue Bombers
2001	Winnipeg Blue Bombers	Hamilton Tiger-Cats
2002	Montreal Alouettes	Toronto Argonauts
2003	Montreal Alouettes	Toronto Argonauts
2004	Toronto Argonauts	Montreal Alouettes
2005	Montreal Alouettes	Toronto Argonauts
2006	Montreal Alouettes	Toronto Argonauts
2007	Winnipeg Blue Bombers	Toronto Argonauts
2008	Montreal Alouettes	Edmonton Eskimos
2009	Montreal Alouettes	BC Lions
2010	Montreal Alouettes	Toronto Argonauts
2011	Winnipeg Blue Bombers	Hamilton Tiger-Cats
2012	Toronto Argonauts	Montreal Alouettes
2013	Hamilton Tiger-Cats	Toronto Argonauts
2014	Hamilton Tiger-Cats	Montreal Alouettes
2015	Ottawa Redblacks	Hamilton Tiger-Cats
2016	Ottawa Redblacks	Edmonton Eskimos
2017	Toronto Argonauts	Saskatchewan Roughriders
2018	Ottawa Redblacks	Hamilton Tiger-Cats
2019	Hamilton Tiger-Cats	Edmonton Eskimos
2020	No season: COVID-19 pandemic	
2021	Hamilton Tiger-Cats	Toronto Argonauts
2022	Toronto Argonauts	Montreal Alouettes
2023	Montreal Alouettes	Toronto Argonauts
2024	Toronto Argonauts	Montreal Alouettes
2025	Montreal Alouettes	Hamilton Tiger-Cats

== Total playoff berths while in the CFL East ==
This reflects Winnipeg Blue Bombers, Baltimore Football Club, and Shreveport Pirates results only while in the East Division.

Team	Division titles	Playoff berths	East Division Championships	Grey Cup/Dominion Championships
Toronto Argonauts	23	55	24	17
Hamilton Tiger-Cats	19	56	20	9
Montreal Alouettes	15	49	19	8
Ottawa Rough Riders	19	48	9	6
Hamilton Tigers (Note: Played in the IRFU from 1907 to 1947)	14	16	14	6
Winnipeg Blue Bombers (Note: Played in the East Division 1987–1994, 1997–2001, 2006–2013)	7	14	7	2
Montreal AAA Winged Wheelers	3	2	2	1
Ottawa Redblacks	3	4	3	1
Montreal Football Club	1	1	1	1
Baltimore Football Club	0	1	0	0
Montreal Indians	0	0	0	0
Montreal Cubs	0	0	0	0
Montreal Royals	0	0	0	0
Hamilton Wildcats (Note: Played in the IRFU from 1948 to 1949)	0	0	0	0
Shreveport Pirates	0	0	0	0
Ottawa Renegades	0	0	0	0
