= 16th Grey Cup =

1928 Canadian Football championship game

| Regina Roughriders | Hamilton Tigers |
|---|---|
| (6–0) | (6–0) |
| 0 | 30 |
| Head coach: Al Ritchie | Head coach: Mike Rodden |
| | 1 | 2 | 3 | 4 | Total |
|---|---|---|---|---|---|
| Regina Roughriders | 0 | 0 | 0 | 0 | 0 |
| Hamilton Tigers | 6 | 0 | 19 | 5 | 30 |
- Date: December 1, 1928
- Stadium: A.A.A. Grounds
- Location: Hamilton
- Attendance: 4,767

The 16th Grey Cup was played on December 1, 1928, before 4,767 fans at the A.A.A. Grounds at Hamilton.

The Hamilton Tigers shut out the Regina Roughriders 30–0.
