= 20th Grey Cup =

1932 Canadian Football championship game

Regina Roughriders	Hamilton Tigers
(5–1)	(5–1)
6	25
Head coach: Al Ritchie	Head coach: Billy Hughes
	1	2	3	4	Total
Regina Roughriders	0	0	0	6	6
Hamilton Tigers	9	7	9	0	25
- Date: December 3, 1932
- Stadium: Civic Stadium
- Location: Hamilton
- Attendance: 4,806

The 20th Grey Cup was played on December 3, 1932, before 4,806 fans at the Civic Stadium at Hamilton.

The Hamilton Tigers defeated the Regina Roughriders 25–6.
