= 17th Grey Cup =

1929 Canadian Football championship game

Regina Roughriders	Hamilton Tigers
(3–0–1)	(5–1)
3	14
Head coach: Al Ritchie	Head coach: Mike Rodden
	1	2	3	4	Total
Regina Roughriders	0	1	0	2	3
Hamilton Tigers	1	1	7	5	14
- Date: November 30, 1929
- Stadium: A.A.A. Grounds
- Location: Hamilton
- Attendance: 1,906

The 17th Grey Cup was played on November 30, 1929, before 1,906 fans at the A.A.A. Grounds at Hamilton.

The Hamilton Tigers defeated the Regina Roughriders 14–3.
