= Hamilton Tigers (football) =

Canadian rugby football team

General information
- Founded: 1869; 157 years ago
- Folded: 1950; 76 years ago (Merged with Hamilton Wildcats to form Hamilton Tiger-Cats)
- Stadium: Hamilton AAA Grounds; Civic Stadium
- Headquartered: Hamilton, Ontario, Canada
- Colours: Black, gold

Team history
- Hamilton Football Club (1869–1872); Hamilton Tigers (1873–1949)

League / conference affiliations
- ORFU (1883–1906); IRFU (1907–1947); ORFU (1948–1949)

Championships
- Grey Cups: 5; 1913, 1915, 1928, 1929, 1932

The Hamilton Tigers were a Canadian football team based in Hamilton, Ontario, that played in the Ontario Rugby Football Union (ORFU) from 1883 to 1906 and 1948 to 1949 and in the Interprovincial Rugby Football Union (IRFU) from 1907 to 1947. The club was a founding member of both the ORFU in 1883 and the IRFU in 1907. Throughout their history, the Tigers won five Grey Cup championships and two dominion championships, including the 1908 title, the year before the Grey Cup was first awarded. After struggling to compete on a sound financial level with the Hamilton Wildcats, who had joined the ORFU in 1941 and later the IRFU, the two clubs merged in 1950 to form the Hamilton Tiger-Cats.

== History ==
=== Founding ===
The Hamilton Football Club was founded on November 3, 1869, in a room above George Lee's Fruit Store, where the club adopted the colours of black and yellow. The first game in franchise history took place on December 18, 1869, against the 13th Battalion (now Royal Hamilton Light Infantry) where the final score was not recorded. The club was first referred to as the Tigers in their first game against the Toronto Argonauts at the University of Toronto. In that game, which was won by Toronto by a goal and a try to nil, it was the first time that Hamilton wore black and yellow, hence the nickname "Tigers."

=== Ontario Rugby Football Union ===
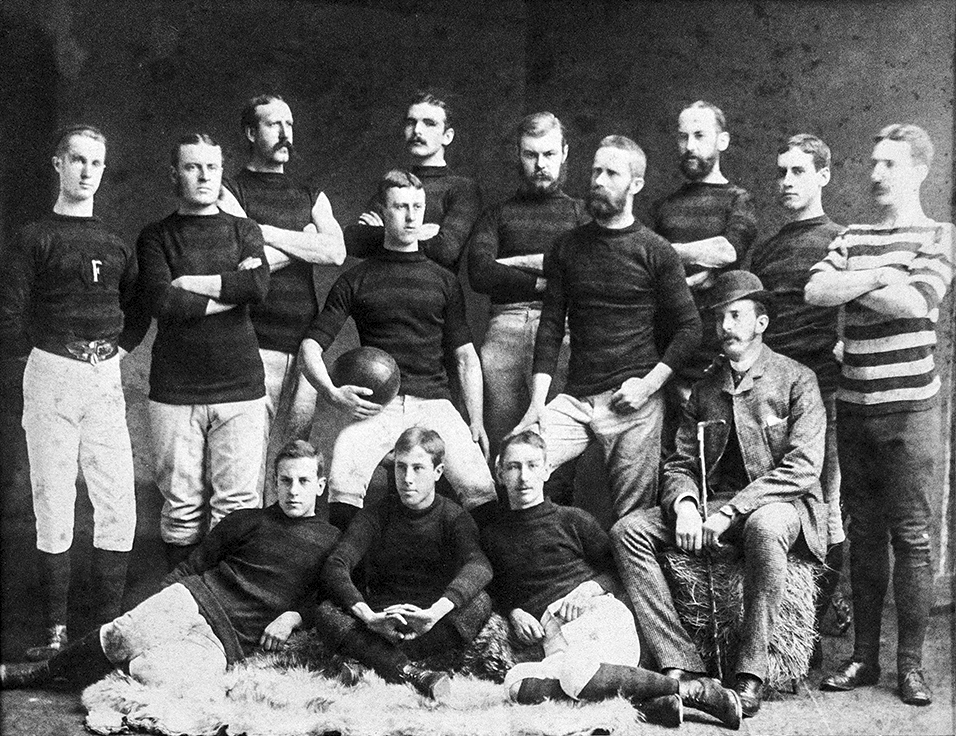
Hamilton FC team of 1883

On January 6, 1883, the Ontario Rugby Football Union was formed to provide a structured league of rugby-football play among teams based in Ontario. The Hamilton Tigers were one of the first 16 teams in this league, which consisted of both club and university teams. The Tigers initially played well, but could not advance to the championship game. It was not until 1888 that they met Ottawa College in the ORFU final, but lost that game 10–1. After seven years in the league, the Tigers won their first ORFU championship in 1890 over Queen's University by a score of 8–6, bringing the city of Hamilton their first championship team. They went on to win the ORFU championship in 1897 over Osgoode Hall 16–8, but saw difficult times at the turn of the century.

In 1898, the Canadian Rugby Union instituted regular season play, whereas the teams would be solely playing a playoff-like structure prior. While it intensified play between the Toronto Argonauts, Ottawa Rough Riders, and Kingston Granites, it also exposed Hamilton as the weaker of the four. However, the Tigers returned to form in 1903 and proceeded to dominate all competition in the ORFU, winning four consecutive championships. There were, however, several disputes with the Canadian Rugby Union and the Quebec Rugby Football Union that prevented the Tigers from competing for a national championship from 1903 to 1905. It was not until 1906, where the Tigers finally agreed to play the QRFU rules, that Hamilton defeated McGill University by a score of 29–3, to become dominion champions.

=== Interprovincial Rugby Football Union ===
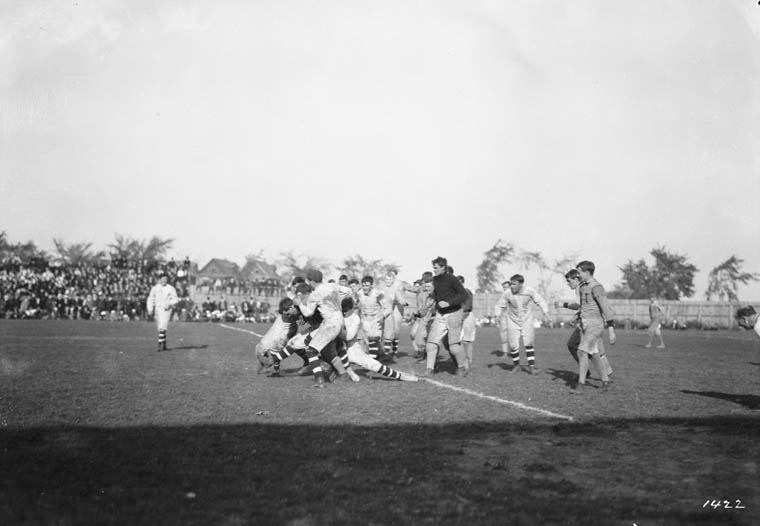
The Hamilton Tigers playing an unknown Ottawa team, 1910

The Interprovincial Rugby Football Union was formed on October 2, 1907. Both the Tigers and Toronto Argonauts of the ORFU and the Ottawa Rough Riders and the Montreal Football Club of the QRFU joined the new league. In 1908, the Tigers won the last national championship to be awarded before the introduction of the Grey Cup trophy in 1909. The team faced local competition with the newly formed Ontario Rugby Football Union's Hamilton Alerts who, in 1912, won the city of Hamilton its first Grey Cup by beating the Toronto Argonauts 11–4. The Alerts having challenged the authority of the ORFU during that season, were not reinstated into the union, so many of its players joined the Tigers in the off-season. The Tigers went on to win their first Grey Cup over the Toronto Parkdale Canoe Club in 1913 by a score of 44–2. They won their second Grey Cup two years later in the last Grey Cup game to be played before the First World War interrupted play for three years.

After the Great War, the Tigers struggled to return to the title game, while only qualifying for post-season play twice in the following seven years and losing to Queen's both times. It was not until 1927 that Hamilton once again reached the Grey Cup by defeating Queen's, but losing to the Toronto Balmy Beach Beachers. However, their fortunes changed as they played the Regina Roughriders in the first radio play-by-play broadcast Grey Cup game in a 30–3 victory for the Tabbies. The Tigers again posted victories over the Roughriders the next year in 1929 and again in 1932 in convincing fashion. However, the Tigers earned the dubious distinction of becoming the first team to lose to a team based in Western Canada, to the Winnipeg 'Pegs in the 23rd Grey Cup. After their loss to Winnipeg, the fortunes of the Tigers waned as they did not have a winning record in the next five years. In 1941, the Hamilton Tigers suspended operations due to many of its players joining the army to fight in the Second World War.

=== Post-war ===
During the war, a new team was formed in 1941 to begin play in the ORFU, named the Hamilton Wildcats. The Wildcats enjoyed success in Steeltown after having won the Grey Cup in 1943 and having outstanding regular season records. The Tigers resumed operations in 1945 along with the rest of the IRFU, but both clubs found it difficult to directly compete in the Hamilton market. More importantly, the Tigers were experiencing monetary disputes with the IRFU over allocations of revenue. After signing Frank Filchock, who had been suspended by the NFL due to gambling issues, the Tigers felt that the other teams in the IRFU should share in the payment of his high salary because they were benefiting from higher attendances when he was playing in their cities. After the IRFU refused, the Tigers made an arrangement with the ORFU and transferred to that league, with the Wildcats switching to the IRFU on April 9, 1948.

The switch proved to be a costly one as Filchock left to join the Montreal Alouettes in 1949 and the Tigers were left out of the IRFU. Not only that, but both the Tigers and the Wildcats were struggling to compete for fan support and the financial repercussions started to mount. As a result, local prominent citizens including Ralph W. Cooper, Frank M. Gibson, C.C. Lawson, and Sam Manson decided that the two clubs should amalgamate and operate as one entity. As such, the Hamilton Tiger-Cats football club began play in 1950 in the IRFU as the singular representative of the city of Hamilton. The club kept the black and gold of the Tigers. The only nod to red-clad Wildcats is the red tongue in Tiger-Cats' logo.

== Awards ==
=== National championships ===
Canadian Dominion Football Championships: 2 (1906, 1908)

Grey Cup championships: 5 (1913, 1915, 1928, 1929, 1932)

=== Ontario Rugby Football Union ===
Champions: 8 (1890, 1897, 1903, 1904, 1905, 1906, 1948, 1949)

Regular season titles: 6 (1903, 1904, 1905, 1906, 1948, 1949)

=== Interprovincial Rugby Football Union ===
Champions: 13 (1908, 1910, 1913, 1915, 1923, 1924, 1927, 1928, 1929, 1930, 1932, 1934, 1935)

Regular season titles: 14 (1909, 1910, 1913, 1914, 1915, 1923, 1924, 1927, 1928, 1929, 1930, 1932, 1934, 1935)

== Canadian Football Hall of Famers ==
- Len Back
- Ernie Cox
- Ross Craig
- Seppi DuMoulin
- Cap Fear
- John Ferraro
- Jake Gaudaur
- Bob Isbister
- Pep Leadlay
- Mike Rodden
- Ben Simpson
- Jimmie Simpson
- Victor Spencer
- David Sprague
- Brian Timmis
- Huck Welch
- Seymour Wilson

== Canadian Sports Hall of Famers ==
- Denis Whitaker
