= Grey Cup =

Championship game and trophy of the Canadian Football League

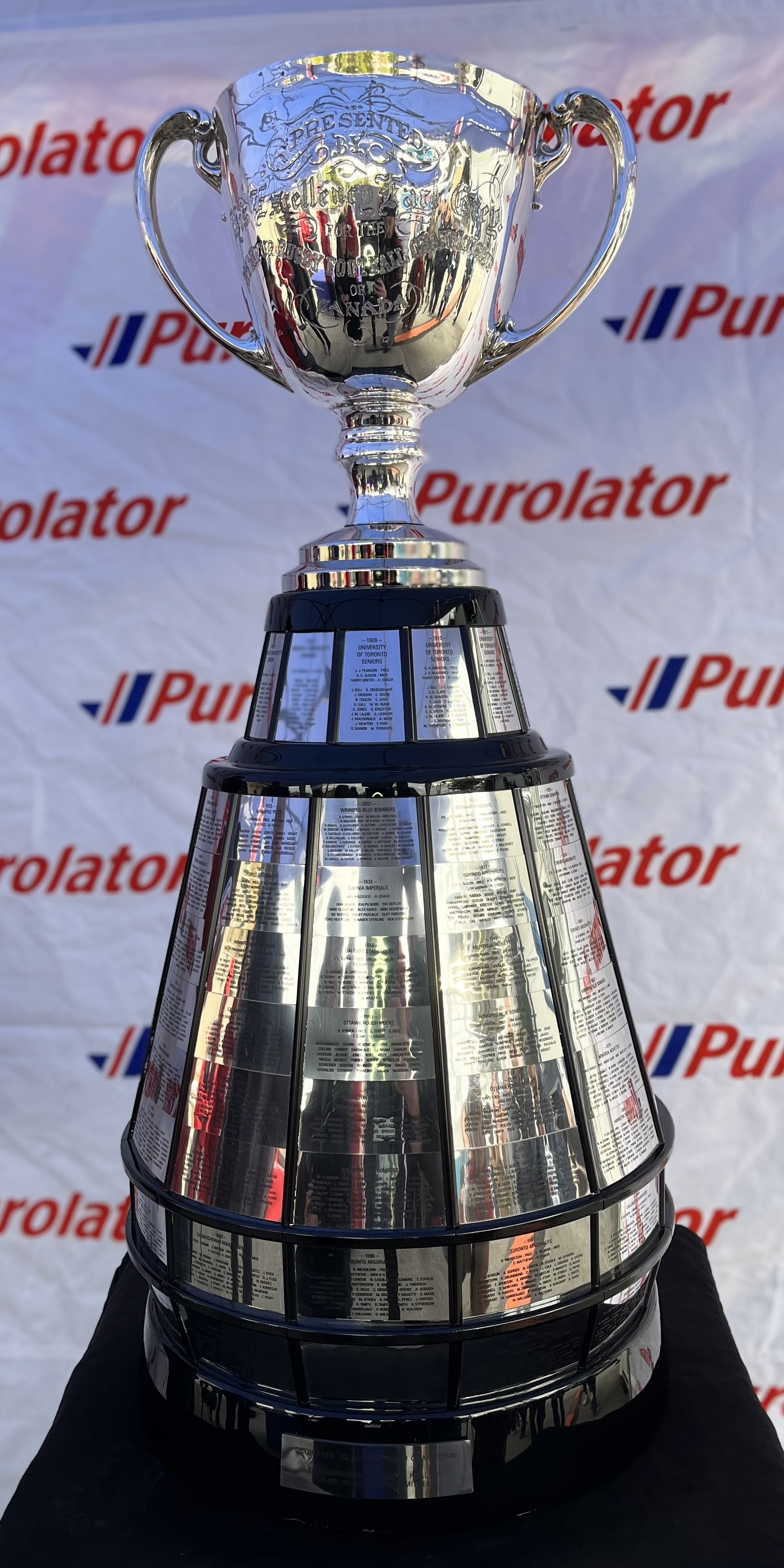
- Grey Cup in 2022
- Awarded for: Winning the Canadian Football League championship
- Country: Canada

History
- First award: 1909; 117 years ago
- Editions: 112
- First winner: Toronto Varsity Blues
- Most wins: Toronto Argonauts (19 titles)
- Most recent: Edmonton Elks (15th title)
- Website: cfl.ca

The Grey Cup (French: Coupe Grey) is both the championship game of the Canadian Football League (CFL) and the trophy awarded to the victorious team playing in the namesake championship of professional Canadian football. The game is contested between the winners of the CFL's East and West divisional playoffs and is one of Canadian television's largest annual sporting events. Since 2022, the game has been held on the third Sunday of November and following Remembrance Day. The Toronto Argonauts have the most Grey Cup wins (19) since its introduction in 1909, while the Edmonton Elks have the most Grey Cup wins (12) since the merger in 1958. The latest, the 113th Grey Cup, took place in Calgary, Alberta, on November 15, 2026, when the Edmonton Elks defeated the Montreal Alouettes 37–30 to win the cup for the 15th time.

The Grey Cup is Canada's largest annual sports and television event, regularly drawing a Canadian viewing audience of about 4 million. Two awards are given for play in the game: the Most Valuable Player and the Dick Suderman Trophy as the most valuable Canadian player. In 2019, Andrew Harris was the first player to win both the Grey Cup's Most Valuable Canadian and Most Valuable Player the same year, playing for the Winnipeg Blue Bombers.

The trophy was commissioned in 1909 by The Earl Grey, then Canada's governor general, who originally hoped to donate it for the country's senior amateur ice hockey championship. After the Allan Cup was donated for that purpose, Grey instead made his trophy available to the winner of the Canadian Dominion Football Championship, the national championship of Canadian football. The trophy has a silver chalice attached to a large base on which the names of all winning teams, players and executives are engraved. The Grey Cup has been broken on several occasions, stolen twice, and held for ransom. It survived a 1947 fire that destroyed numerous artifacts housed in the same building.

The Grey Cup was first won by the Toronto Varsity Blues of the University of Toronto. Play was suspended from 1916 to 1918 due to the First World War and in 1919 due to a rules dispute. The game has typically been contested in an east-versus-west format since the 1920s. The game was always played on a Saturday until 1968, but since 1969 (except for 1970) has always been on a Sunday. Held in late November (in some years in early December, most recently in 2021), and mostly in outdoor stadiums, the Grey Cup has been played in inclement weather at times, including the 1950 "Mud Bowl", in which a player reportedly came close to drowning in a puddle, then the 1962 "Fog Bowl", when the final minutes of the game had to be postponed to the following day due to a heavy fog, and the 1977 "Ice Bowl", contested on the frozen-over artificial turf at Montreal's Olympic Stadium. Most recently, in the 2017 game snow fell, at times heavily, throughout the game.

The then-Edmonton Eskimos formed the Grey Cup's longest dynasty, winning five consecutive championships from 1978 to 1982. Competition for the trophy has been exclusively between Canadian teams, except for a three-year period from 1993 to 1995, when an expansion of the CFL south into the United States resulted in the Baltimore Stallions winning the 1995 championship and taking the Grey Cup south of the border for the only time in its history.

== History ==
=== National championships before 1909 ===
Serious efforts to organize a national governing body and eventually a Dominion championship for what at that time was still a game called and practically identical to rugby union began in the early 1880s, culminating in the creation of the Canadian Rugby Union in 1891 and the first CRU-recognized national championship the following year. After that, national championship games were held every year prior to the creation of the Grey Cup except 1899, 1903 and 1904.

=== Creation and early years (1909–1921) ===
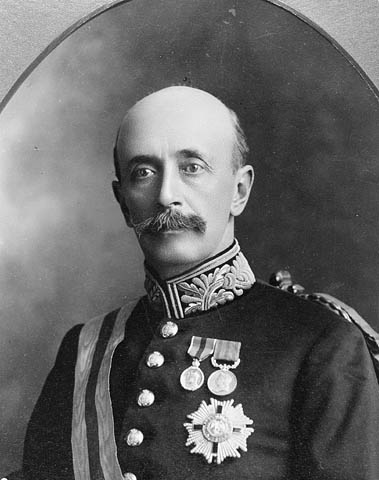
The Earl Grey donated the Grey Cup in 1909.

While the Stanley Cup was created in 1893 as the Canadian amateur hockey championship, professional teams were openly competing for the trophy by 1907. Albert Grey, 4th Earl Grey, the Governor General of Canada, planned to donate a new trophy to serve as the senior amateur championship; however, Sir Montague Allan donated the Allan Cup before he could finalize his plans. Grey instead offered an award for the Canadian amateur rugby football championship beginning in 1909. He initially failed to follow through on his offer; the trophy was not ordered until two weeks prior to the first championship game.

The first Grey Cup game was held on December 4, 1909, between two Toronto clubs: the University of Toronto Varsity Blues defeated the Parkdale Canoe Club 26–6 before 3,800 fans. The trophy was not ready for presentation following the game, and the Varsity Blues did not receive it until March 1910. They retained the trophy in the following two years, defeating the Hamilton Tigers in 1910 and the Toronto Argonauts in 1911. The University of Toronto failed to reach the 1912 Grey Cup, which was won by the Hamilton Alerts over the Argonauts. The Varsity Blues refused to hand over the trophy on the belief they could keep it until they were defeated in a title game. They kept the trophy until 1914 when they were defeated by the Argonauts, who made the trophy available to subsequent champions.

Canada's participation in World War I resulted in the cancellation of the championship from 1916 to 1918, during which time the Cup was forgotten. The Montreal Gazette claimed that the trophy was later rediscovered as "one of the family heirlooms" of an employee of the Toronto trust company where it had been sent for storage. The Grey Cup game was also cancelled in 1919 due to a lack of interest from the Interprovincial Rugby Football Union (IRFU) and the intercollegiate unions, along with rules conflicts between the Canadian Rugby Union (CRU) and the western union; Canada was still struggling in its recovery from the Spanish flu epidemic that occurred during the last months of World War I. Competition finally resumed in 1920 with the 8th Grey Cup game, won 16–3 by the Varsity Blues over the Argonauts. It was the University of Toronto's fourth, and final, championship.

=== Western participation (1922–1932) ===
Competition for the Grey Cup was limited to member unions of the CRU, the champions of which petitioned the league body for the right to challenge for the national championship. The Western Canada Rugby Football Union (WCRFU) was formed in 1911, but the CRU did not come to a participation agreement with it until 1921, allowing the Edmonton Eskimos (no lineage to the team that used that name 1949–2020) of the WCRFU to challenge. Facing the Argonauts in the 9th Grey Cup, the Eskimos became the first western team – and the first from outside Toronto or Hamilton – to compete for the trophy. The Argonauts entered the game with an undefeated record, having outscored their opposition 226 to 55 during the season. They dominated Edmonton, recording the first shutout in Grey Cup history with a 23–0 victory. Multi-sport star Lionel Conacher was Toronto's top player, scoring 15 of his team's points before leaving the game after the third quarter to join his hockey team for their game. The same Edmonton team (renamed as Elks for that single season) challenged for the trophy again in 1922, but lost 13–1 to their eastern opposition, the Queen's University Golden Gaels. For Queen's, it was the first of three consecutive titles.

Western teams continued to vie for the trophy, but were consistently outclassed for several years. Eastern teams and critics felt the quality of the western game was inferior to theirs, and when Queen's defeated the Regina Rugby Club 54–0 in the 1923 final, the critics felt they deliberately ran up the score to prove that point. Regina was western Canada's dominant team, appearing in the Grey Cup on six occasions between 1928 and 1934, but lost to their eastern opponents each time. Regina helped revolutionize Canadian football in 1929, however, as they attempted the first forward pass in Grey Cup history. The Winnipeg 'Pegs (now the Blue Bombers) became the first western Grey Cup champion in 1935 when they defeated the Hamilton Tigers, 18–12. While the Grey Cup was slow to achieve national popularity, the advent of the east versus west format helped make the game the nation's largest sporting event.

=== Progress towards professionalism (1933–1956) ===
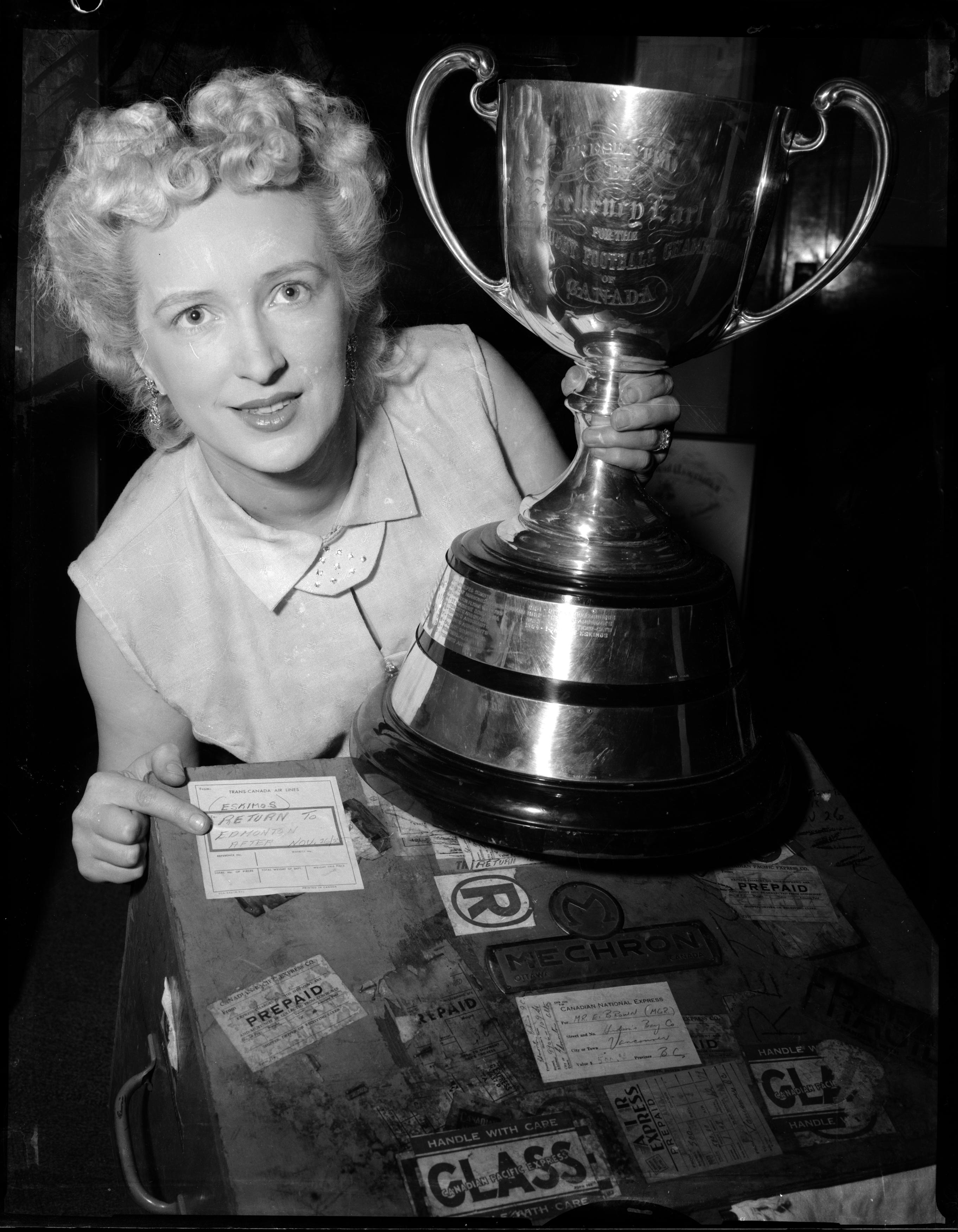
Woman poses with Grey Cup in 1955.

As the quality of senior football improved, university teams realized they were no longer able to compete on equal footing and withdrew from competition for the Grey Cup in 1933. By 1938, only three unions continued to compete under the banner of the CRU: the IRFU (now commonly known as the Big Four) and the Ontario Rugby Football Union (ORFU) in the east, and the Western Interprovincial Football Union (WIFU) in the west. The CRU experimented with a two-game, total points series to determine the champion in 1940. The Ottawa Rough Riders won both games against Toronto's Balmy Beach, 8–2 and 12–5. The Grey Cup returned to its one-game format the following year.

Both the Big Four and WIFU suspended operations in 1942 due to the Second World War. Grey Cup play was expected to be suspended along with the unions; however, the military felt the game and sport would serve as a morale booster and organized teams at bases across the country. For the following three years, Grey Cup competition was limited to military teams, and in the 1942 Grey Cup, the Toronto RCAF Hurricanes defeated the Winnipeg RCAF Bombers 8–5 to become the first non-civilian team to win the national championship. Two years later, the St. Hyacinthe–Donnacona Navy defeated the Hamilton Flying Wildcats, 7–6; no Grey Cup championship since then has featured two eastern teams. The conclusion of the war led to the reformation of civilian teams; the Big Four resumed play in 1945, and the WIFU the following year.

A push by the sport's organizers to adopt an increasingly professional attitude dominated the post-war period: poor field conditions, previously accepted as part of the game, resulted in numerous complaints against the CRU following the 1949 and 1950 Grey Cups. Field conditions at Toronto's Varsity Stadium were so poor in 1950 that the game has since gained infamy as the "Mud Bowl". Deep ruts in the field and poor weather in the days leading up to the game resulted in a sloppy field covered in large puddles of water. The game also gained notoriety for the near drowning of Winnipeg's Buddy Tinsley, who was found face down in a large puddle, apparently unconscious. Tinsley later said that he had not lost consciousness, but his leg had gone numb from a hard hit to a preexisting injury. Toronto won the game 13–0, the last time a team has been shut out in a Grey Cup game.

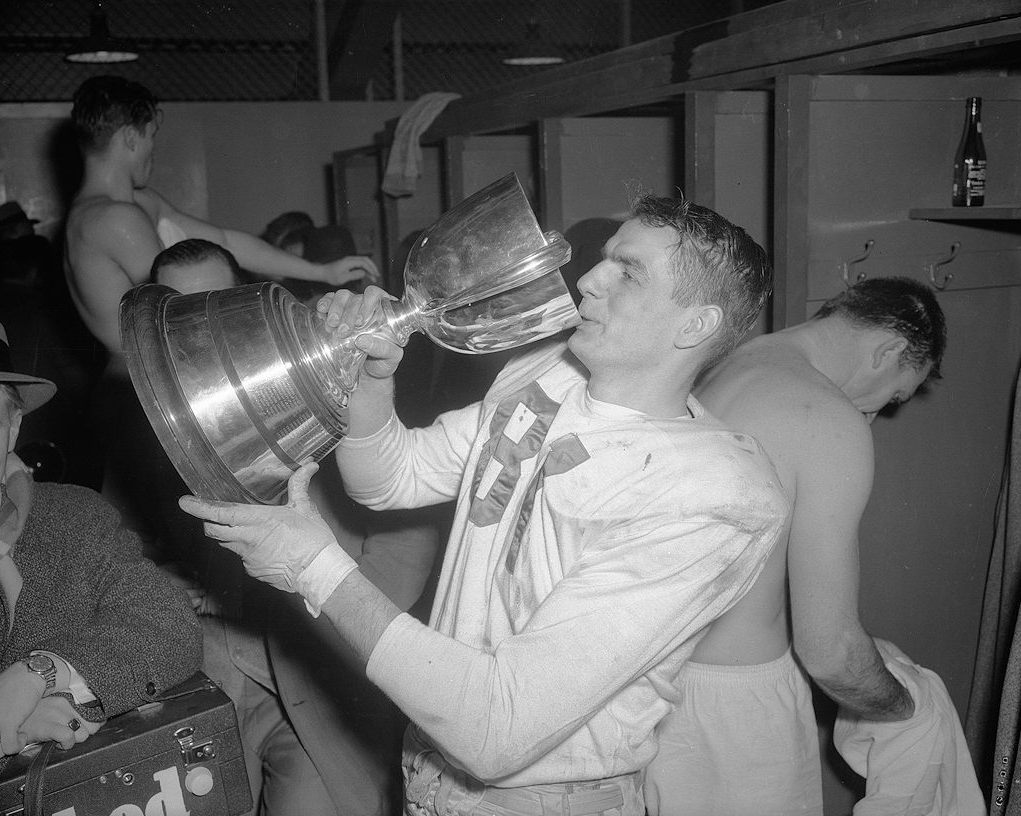
Don Getty, future Premier of Alberta, celebrates with the Grey Cup after the Eskimos' 1956 championship.

The ORFU, the last purely amateur union competing for the Grey Cup, withdrew from Cup competition in 1954. Although the Big Four and WIFU champions had faced each other in the Grey Cup final since 1945, the ORFU's withdrawal left the IRFU and WIFU unchallenged as Canada's top football unions. The Eskimos faced the Montreal Alouettes in three consecutive Grey Cups in the mid-1950s, winning all three. Edmonton's first title in 1954 ended in bizarre fashion after Jackie Parker scored a touchdown (converted by Bob Dean) from a fumble recovery late in the game that gave Edmonton a 26–25 lead. At the time in Canadian football, touchdowns were only worth 5 points. Parker's 90-yard fumble return was the longest in league history until Toronto's Cassius Vaughn returned a Calgary fumble 109 yards in the 2017 Grey Cup game which was won by Toronto. The 1954 game also marked the end of the amateur era as the top teams completed their transition to professional organizations.

As the 1950s wore on, the Big Four and WIFU distanced themselves from the CRU, forming the Canadian Football Council in 1956 to administer the game at the professional level. Two years later, on January 18, 1958, the CFC withdrew from the CRU and the Big Four & WIFU merged into the Canadian Football League (CFL). The new league formally assumed control of the Grey Cup from the CRU.

=== Canadian Football League kicks off (1957–1969) ===
In the CFL's initial seasons, the Hamilton Tiger-Cats were the league's dominant team, appearing in nine Grey Cups and winning four titles between 1957 and 1967. The Winnipeg Blue Bombers opposed Hamilton on six of those occasions, winning four titles. The two teams were involved in a series of bizarre incidents, the first occurring during the 1957 Grey Cup. Toronto-based lawyer and fan David Humphrey had talked his way past stadium security and had been allowed to watch the game from the sidelines. Ten minutes into the fourth quarter, Hamilton's Ray Bawel intercepted a pass and it appeared he would return the ball for a touchdown when Humphrey stuck his leg out and tripped Bawel as he ran up the sideline. Unsure how to handle the situation as there was no rule designed to cover it, referee Paul Dojack invented one on the spot. He placed the ball half the distance to the Winnipeg goal line from the point Bawel was tripped. The incident did not affect the final score, as Hamilton won 32–7. The league also created a new rule during the 1961 Grey Cup as it was the first in history to end regulation time in a tie: CFL Commissioner Sid Halter determined the teams would play an overtime period that consisted of two five-minute halves. That rule remained the CFL standard into the 2000s. Winnipeg scored the lone touchdown in overtime to defeat Hamilton 21–14.

Winnipeg and Hamilton met again in 1962, the 50th Grey Cup, immortalized as the "Fog Bowl". The game was held at Toronto's Exhibition Stadium, and began on Saturday, December 1, 1962. The fog rolled in early in the second quarter and became increasingly dense as the game progressed. By the fourth quarter, the players were unable to see the sideline markers and the fans unable to see the play. The players were unable to see the ball in the air – kick returners listened for the sound of the ball hitting the ground – and the action was largely invisible to the television audience. With nine minutes and twenty-nine seconds remaining in the game and Winnipeg holding onto a 28–27 lead, officials made the unprecedented decision to suspend play until the next day. Though the league feared that continuing fog on the morning of December 2 would force the complete abandonment of the game, it lifted in time for the contest to resume. Around 15,000 of the original 32,655 spectators watched Winnipeg win the Grey Cup without further scoring by either team. It was the first title game completed on a Sunday; the Grey Cup moved from its traditional Saturday start to Sunday in 1969; however, the game was played on a Saturday for the last time in 1970.

The Saskatchewan Roughriders won their first ever Grey Cup in 1966 when they defeated the Ottawa Rough Riders 29–14 at Empire Stadium in Vancouver before 36,553 fans.

=== Eskimos' dynasty (1970–1988) ===
The Montreal Alouettes' 1970 Grey Cup championship, an upset win over the favoured Calgary Stampeders, served as a morale booster for the city of Montreal, which was reeling in the aftermath of the October Crisis. The 1970s belonged to the Edmonton Eskimos, however, as they ended the decade as one of the most dominant teams in CFL history, reaching the Grey Cup nine times between 1973 and 1982. The team competed in three consecutive finals early in the decade, losing to Ottawa in 1973 and Montreal in 1974, before winning the franchise's fourth championship in 1975. The 1975 championship was held in Calgary and was the first Grey Cup played on the Canadian Prairies. A young woman infamously streaked across the field during the national anthem despite frigid temperatures well below freezing. The only time the Eskimos did not reach the Grey Cup final during this span was in 1976, when the Saskatchewan Roughriders met the Ottawa Rough Riders, in the final all-"Roughriders" Grey Cup game. Both teams fought a see-saw battle, which was decided in the dying seconds of the game when Ottawa quarterback Tom Clements threw to Tony Gabriel, which stood out as the winning touchdown, 23–20. The 1977 Grey Cup was the first held at Olympic Stadium in Montreal, contested by the home town Alouettes and the Eskimos in front of a record crowd of 68,318. The game became known as the "Ice Bowl", as low temperatures froze snow on the field that had been melted by groundskeepers with salt, making the artificial turf extremely slippery. The Alouettes adapted to the field conditions by affixing staples to the soles of their shoes, improving their traction, and won the game by a 41–6 score.

Upset at losing the 1977 game under poor weather conditions, the Eskimos hoped for a rematch with Montreal in 1978. Both teams reached the final game, which Edmonton won 20–13. It was the first of five consecutive championships, a streak that remains unmatched in the history of the Grey Cup. The Eskimos' dynasty dominated the league, losing a total of only six games during the three seasons from 1979 to 1981. The 1981 Grey Cup was expected to be yet another easy win for Edmonton, who posted a 14–1–1 record during the season and were considered overwhelming favourites against the surprise Eastern champions, the 5–11 Ottawa Rough Riders. The first half did not go as Edmonton hoped, though, as Ottawa, led by rookie quarterback J.C. Watts, emerged with a 20–1 lead. Quarterback Warren Moon led the Eskimos back in the second half, and with the game tied at 23, Dave Cutler kicked the game-winning field goal with just three seconds remaining.

Edmonton's championship run came to an end in 1983 when they lost in the West Semi-Final game; the Argonauts defeated the BC Lions to win the championship that year, ending the team's 31-year Grey Cup title drought. Despite Toronto's win, the CFL felt that the overall quality of play in the East Division had deteriorated compared to that of the West. In 1986, it altered the playoff format to allow the first non-playoff team in one division to take the last playoff spot, but stay in their division if they had a better record. The consequences of the new rules were felt immediately, as the league gave a playoff spot to the Stampeders having a better record than the Alouettes, and decided the East Division Final would be a 2-game-total-point Final between the Toronto Argonauts and the Hamilton Tiger-Cats, who finished first and second, respectively. The crossover, if necessary, would begin in 1987. In financial difficulty, the loss of the playoff spot was disastrous for Montreal, which ceased operations one year later. The crossover rule was eliminated and not revisited until a decade later due to Montreal's folding (ironically, the crossover rule returned with the Alouettes' revival). Reduced to eight teams, the CFL shifted Winnipeg to the East Division, making the 1988 Grey Cup between the Blue Bombers and Lions the first championship game between two western Canadian teams.

=== CFL USA (1989–1995) ===
The 1989 Grey Cup is considered one of the finest games in Canadian football history: The Saskatchewan Roughriders won their second championship by defeating the Hamilton Tiger-Cats 43–40 in the highest scoring Grey Cup game of all time. Saskatchewan kicker Dave Ridgway's last-second field goal won the game and made him a legend in the prairie province.

Declining interest in the CFL during the 1990s left the league in financial difficulty. Hoping to restore the league's credibility with fans, a new ownership group featuring Bruce McNall, hockey player Wayne Gretzky and actor John Candy purchased the Toronto Argonauts in 1991 and lured American college standout Rocket Ismail to Canada with a four-year, $26.2 million contract which made him the highest paid player in football history at that time. The Argonauts reached the 1991 Grey Cup and defeated the Calgary Stampeders 36–21. With 261 all-purpose yards on the game, including a then-Grey Cup record 87-yard kickoff return for a touchdown, Ismail was named Grey Cup Most Valuable Player.

The potential for the league to enter the American market was discussed in 1987 when operators of the defunct United States Football League approached the CFL about merging the two leagues. The league showed little interest at the time, but as it continued its decline, the CFL reevaluated its position. In 1992, the CFL announced that it would expand into the United States. The Sacramento Gold Miners joined the league and became the first American team eligible to win the Grey Cup. The league added three additional American teams in 1994 and two in 1995 (with one team folding), but the initiative failed in most markets, and by 1996, the CFL again operated exclusively within Canada.

The lone successful American market was in Baltimore, home to the Stallions. The team averaged over 35,000 fans per game in its inaugural season, nearly double that of Toronto or Hamilton. They matched that success on the field by becoming the first American team to play in the Grey Cup. The BC Lions kept the Grey Cup in Canada with a 26–23 victory in the 1994 final. Baltimore returned to the title game one year later and became the only American team to win the trophy by defeating the Calgary Stampeders, 37–20. The establishment of the National Football League's Baltimore Ravens in 1996 caused the Stallions to seek a new city to avoid direct competition with an NFL team. The team moved to Montreal, forming the current incarnation of the Alouettes franchise and ending the CFL's excursion into the United States.

=== Renaissance (1996–present) ===
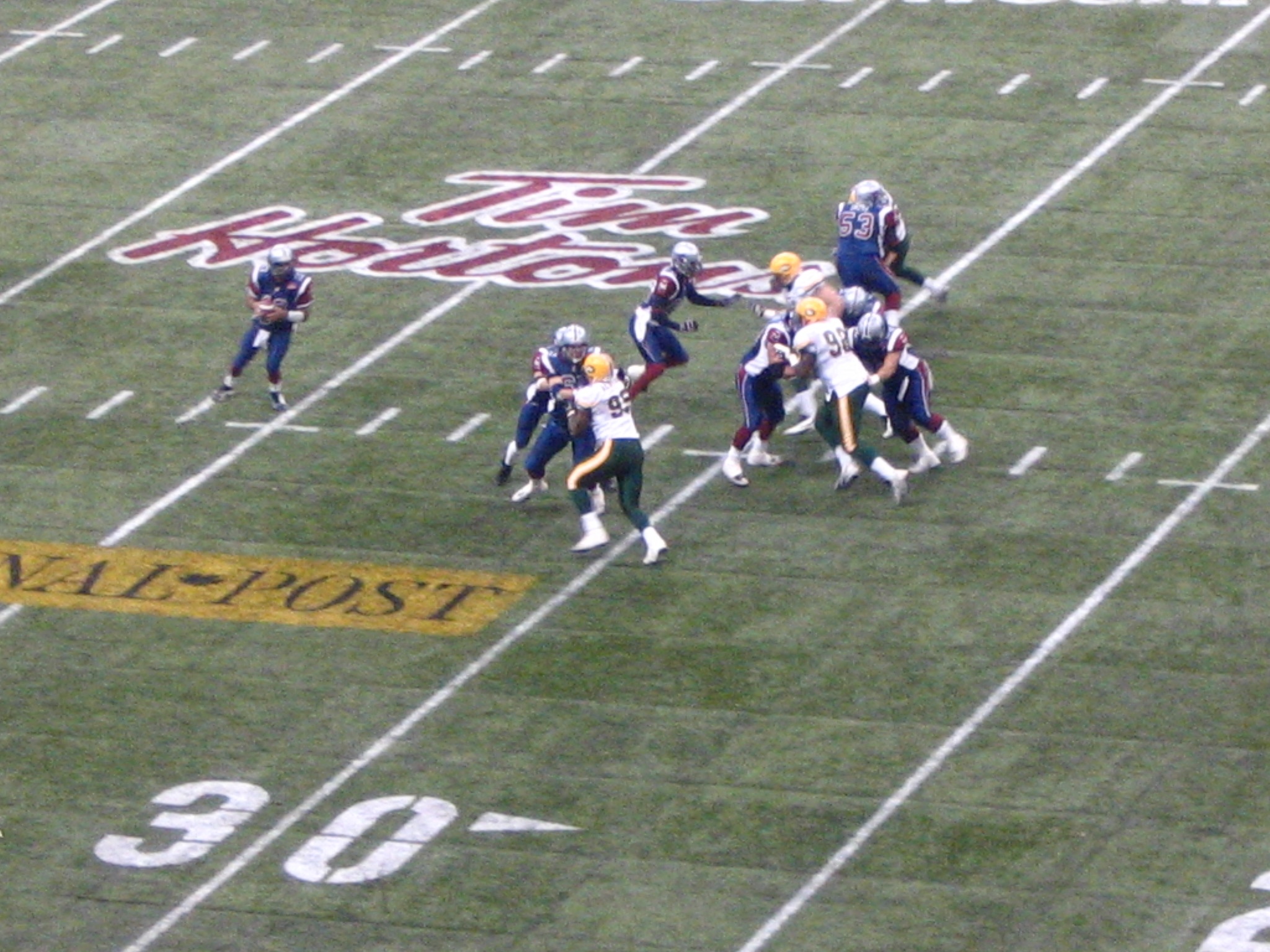
Montreal Alouettes quarterback Anthony Calvillo looks down field with the ball during the 2005 Grey Cup against the Edmonton Eskimos at BC Place Stadium.

The league approached the 1996 Grey Cup in dire financial straits: the American expansion had been a failure, the 120-year-old Ottawa Rough Riders franchise ceased operations at the conclusion of the regular season, and out of the eight remaining teams, seven had lost money and two required direct assistance from the league to stay afloat. The Edmonton Eskimos could not afford to bring their players' families to the championship game. The Toronto Star echoed fears spoken by fans and media across the country when it asked if the 1996 championship, won by Toronto over Edmonton, would be the final Grey Cup.

While the league struggled, the Grey Cup game itself retained its popularity and remained a national institution. The strength of the contest allowed the league to endure its challenges. The CFL survived into 1997 and was buoyed by an interest-free loan from the NFL, a new television deal with The Sports Network which, along with the launch of its popular Friday Night Football program, has been credited with saving the league. That year's Grey Cup, held in Edmonton and won by Toronto, drew nearly 22,000 more fans than the previous year. The CFL restored its reputation over time, enjoying new popularity into the 2000s such that it no longer had to rely on an exciting Grey Cup final to achieve stability for the next season.

In 2000, the 8–10 BC Lions made history when they defeated the Montreal Alouettes, 28–26, becoming the first team in history to win the Grey Cup with a losing record in the regular season. In the game, 25-year veteran Lui Passaglia ended the longest career in CFL history by kicking what was ultimately the game-winning field goal. The Calgary Stampeders matched the Lions' feat the next year by becoming the second 8–10 team to win the Grey Cup, defeating the Winnipeg Blue Bombers by a 27–19 score in front of 65,255 fans, the second largest crowd in the game's history.

The 2005 Grey Cup was the second overtime game in Grey Cup history, and the first one using the league's shootout overtime format (introduced in 2000). Both the Eskimos and Alouettes scored touchdowns on their first possessions, while Edmonton scored a field goal in its second and held Montreal scoreless to win the game by a 38–35 score. The game was played in the middle of a stretch of eight Grey Cup appearances by the Alouettes between 2000 and 2010. In 2009, they defeated the Roughriders in dramatic fashion: placekicker Damon Duval missed a last-second field goal attempt that appeared to give Saskatchewan the victory. However, the Riders were penalized for having too many men on the field, allowing Duval a second opportunity. His second attempt was successful, giving Montreal a 28–27 victory.

The 100th Grey Cup game was played on November 25, 2012, at the Rogers Centre in Toronto between the Toronto Argonauts and the Calgary Stampeders. The Toronto Argonauts won the Grey Cup with a score of 35–22.

As per a new title sponsorship deal with Shaw Communications announced in May 2015, the event was thenceforth known as the Grey Cup presented by Shaw.

The 104th Grey Cup game was played at BMO Field in Toronto, which became the new home of the Argonauts beginning in the 2016 season. The 104th turned out to be one of the most memorable, with the Ottawa Redblacks winning their first Grey Cup by a score of 39–33 over the heavily favoured Calgary Stampeders as Henry Burris passed to Ernest Jackson for a touchdown in overtime—only the third overtime game in the history of the Grey Cup. After having been promised the 102nd Grey Cup game as an incentive to rejoin the league, Ottawa hosted the 105th Grey Cup at TD Place Stadium in 2017, as part of celebrations to mark 150 years of Confederation. The 55th Grey Cup, played at the end of the 1967 CFL season, was also held in Ottawa as part of celebrations to mark 100 years of Confederation.

In May 2020, due to postponement of the regular season and other factors relating to the COVID-19 pandemic, it was announced that the 108th Grey Cup festivities in Regina, Saskatchewan (which were to be the first to be hosted by the new Mosaic Stadium) had been cancelled and postponed to 2022, and that the site of the game, if held, would be based on regular season records rather than as a neutral site. The Grey Cup itself was later cancelled in August along with the 2020 CFL season, which was the first year that the Grey Cup was not contested since 1919.

== Trophy ==
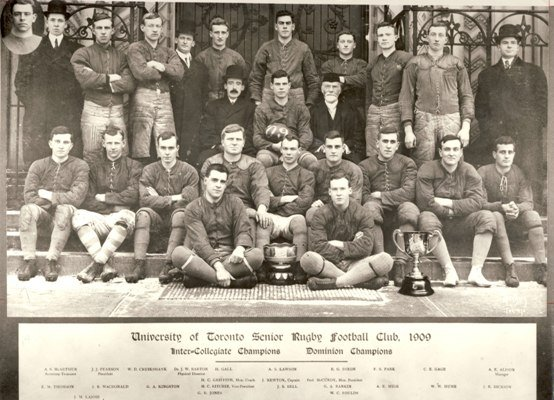
1909 Varsity Blues, inaugural champions. The Grey Cup is pictured at the front right.

The trophy was commissioned in 1909 at a cost of $48. The chalice is made of sterling silver and stands 33 centimetres (13 in) tall. Its original base was made of wood, with silver shields listing each championship year and winning team's name, beginning with the University of Toronto Varsity Blues. The players of the 1915 championship Hamilton team, apparently as revenge for Toronto's refusal to relinquish the trophy in 1912 and 1913, added a shield for the 1908 Tigers team to give the appearance that their organization had won the first Grey Cup.

A 1947 fire destroyed the clubhouse of the Toronto Argonaut Rowing Club and damaged the Grey Cup. Many other trophies and artifacts in the clubhouse melted or were damaged beyond repair but the Grey Cup survived by catching onto a nail attached to a surviving wall when the shelf upon which it sat collapsed. The trophy has been broken on six other occasions: in 1978, when it was dropped by celebrating Edmonton Eskimos players; in 1987, when an Eskimos' player sat on it; in 1993, when Edmonton's Blake Dermott head-butted it; in 2006, when the chalice broke away from its base as the BC Lions celebrated their victory; in 2012 when one of the handles broke off as the Toronto Argonauts celebrated; in 2014 when the chalice broke away from its base again as the Calgary Stampeders celebrated their win. The CFL commissioned a replica of the trophy in 2008.

The Grey Cup has been stolen on two occasions: it disappeared for three days in 1967 when it was taken from the Hamilton Tiger-Cats as a prank, and in December 1969 it was stolen from the offices of the Ottawa Rough Riders at Lansdowne Park. The thieves attempted to ransom the trophy, but the CFL refused to pay and made plans to replace it with a duplicate. An anonymous phone call led to the trophy's recovery two months later in a locker at Toronto's Royal York Hotel. The thieves were never found.

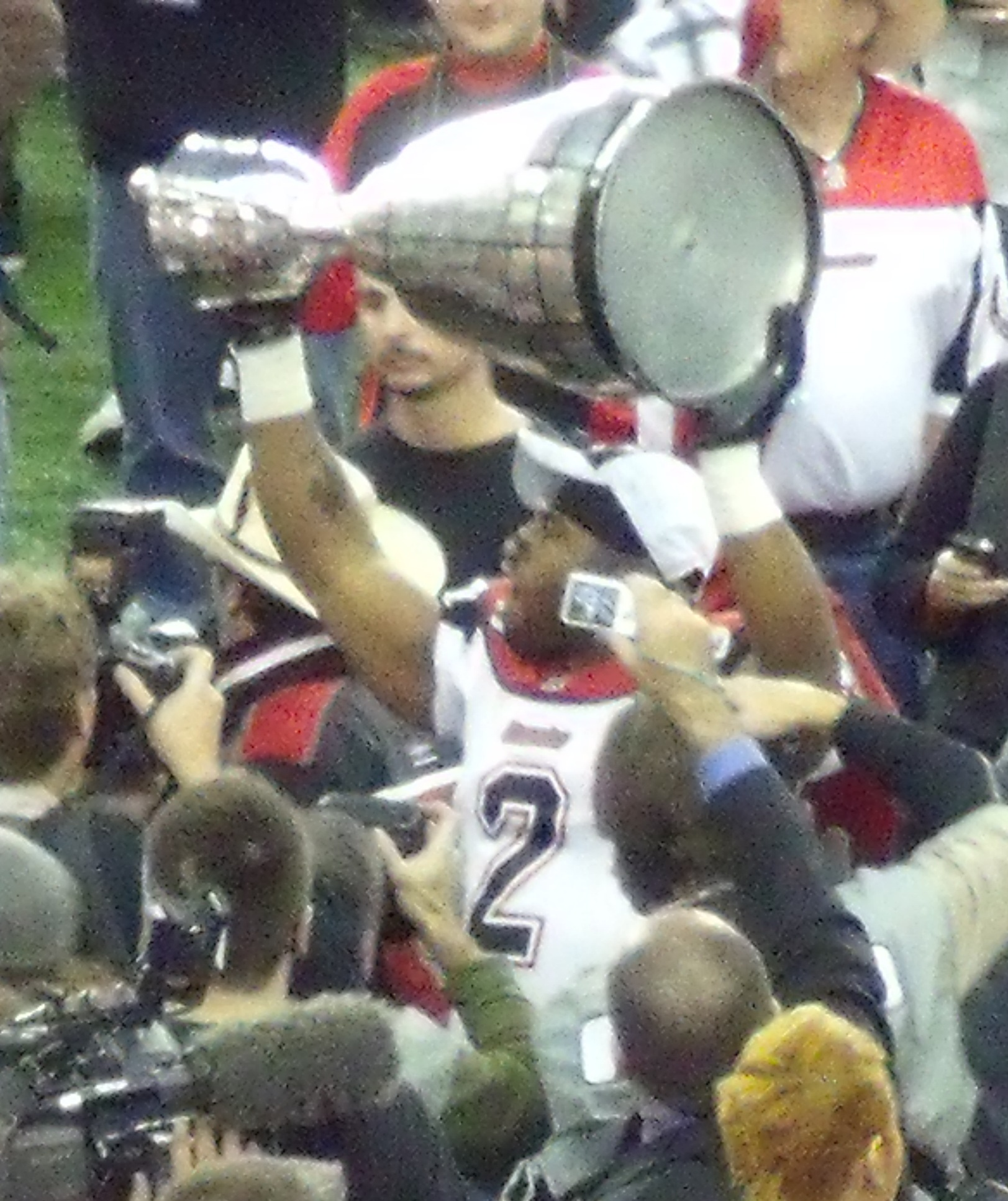
Calgary's JoJuan Armour celebrates his team's 2008 championship.

The current design of the Grey Cup's base was introduced in 1987, coinciding with the 75th anniversary of the first Grey Cup championship. The base stands 84 centimetres (33 in) high and is made of black-lacquered aluminum with silver plates engraved with the names of each winning team's players and executives since 1909. The trophy, one of Canada's best known symbols, ran out of room for new additions following the 2012 Grey Cup. The league announced that the base would be redesigned but remain similar in shape to its current design. In 2020 the new base required the removal of the 1909 plaque. To accommodate all the plaques within the base of the Grey Cup, they were redesigned using laser etching and a modern typeface that allowed for vertical reduction of the characters and letters that had improved legibility. The trophy is customarily escorted to the new champions by two members of the Royal Canadian Mounted Police (as part of its long-time partnership with the CFL) and presented by the commissioner of the CFL. Like the National Hockey League where the Conn Smythe Trophy was presented before the Stanley Cup, the presentation of the trophy has been typically preceded by the presentations of the Dick Suderman Trophy and the Grey Cup Most Valuable Player awards, in contrast to the other three leagues who usually present the World Series MVP, NBA Finals MVP, and Super Bowl MVP awards, respectively, after their championship trophy.

Similar to the Stanley Cup used exclusively today by the NHL, members of the winning teams are allowed time to celebrate with the trophy in their own fashion, often taking it to their home towns or tours in locations across Canada. The board of directors for the Canadian Football Hall of Fame act as the Grey Cup's trustees and control its rental for events. The trophy is accompanied by a designated representative of the Hall of Fame at all times. Like the Stanley Cup, but unlike the Vince Lombardi Trophy for the NFL's Super Bowl, a new trophy is not made every year for the winning team to keep; rather, the Grey Cup is loaned to the winning team for a year.

== Languages ==
English and French are the official languages of the game. The national anthem, league announcements, directional signage, game-day pageantry, and PA announcements such as welcome greetings, anthem introductions, moments of silence, territorial acknowledgements, downs and yardage calls, and all official announcements were done in both languages.

In 2023, there was criticism of the fact that the branding at the Hamilton stadium was entirely in English. One player from the victorious Montreal Alouettes, Marc-Antoine Dequoy, was particularly vocal on this point after the Als won the Grey Cup. The CFL responded the next year by increasing the French branding at the Grey Cup held in Vancouver, and by requiring that the anthem would be bilingual for games where the Als and the Ottawa RedBlacks played. The branding for the Grey Cup at Winnipeg in 2025 was also bilingual. Dequoy complimented the CFL for the changes prior to the 2025 game:

"[What I said at the Grey Cup in 2023] was authentic and if I'm looking at it right now, the CFL community did a great job because it's 50-50 as the 'Coupe Grey' [in Winnipeg this year]," Dequoy told 3DownNation on Wednesday. "You've gotta give credit and this is a credit I'm giving. They did a good job of that."

== Grey Cup festival ==
Each year, the host city organizes numerous events as part of the annual Grey Cup festival. Gala concerts, parties, and fan festivals are held in the days leading up to the championship game. The CFL hands out its annual awards during the festival, and an annual Grey Cup parade is held. Historically, the festival also featured the "Miss Grey Cup" beauty pageant; this was discontinued in 1992. The game itself includes a performance of the Canadian national anthem (usually sung in both English and French, the official languages of the game) and a halftime show, often featuring performances by well-known Canadian musical acts such as Nickelback, who performed at the 2011 game. In recent years, a former football player, a celebrity, or another special guest participates in the coin toss ceremony to recognize their community involvement or significance.

Nicknamed Canada's "Grand National Drunk", the Grey Cup party originated in the 1948 championship when hundreds of Calgary Stampeders fans descended on Toronto for their team's first appearance in the game. Bringing chuckwagons and horses, the fans organized a pancake breakfast – a staple of the Calgary Stampede – for bewildered Torontonians. According to historian Hugh Dempsey, "The Grey Cup was just another game until Calgary went down to Toronto with chuckwagons and everything and turned it into an event." The Stampeders won the game on the strength of the "sleeper play", a touchdown scored by Norm Hill after he hid himself from the Ottawa defence by lying down on the sidelines, as if asleep. He received the pass from quarterback Keith Spaith while still on his back. The victory completed the only undefeated season in the history of Canadian professional football. The boisterous celebrations that followed the win gave rise to the legend of Calgary alderman and future mayor Don Mackay riding his horse into the lobby of the Royal York Hotel. This event was repeated in the 2012 Grey Cup game in Toronto much to the delight of the fans of both teams. The Calgary Grey Cup Committee maintains the tradition of organizing a pancake breakfast at each year's championship.

A 2012 survey found that Canadians consider the Grey Cup to be the most important annual event to attend. Fans of all teams converge at the game venue, including some who have attended 60 or more Grey Cups. The influx of people from across the country is estimated to have an economic impact of over $120 million for the region hosting the championship game.

== Champions ==
Grey Cup appearances, active teams
Team	Wins	Losses	Total	Last Won
Toronto Argonauts	19	6	25	2024
Edmonton Elks	15	9	24	2026
Winnipeg Blue Bombers	12	17	29	2021
Ottawa Redblacks	10	8	18	2016
Hamilton Tiger-Cats	8	14	22	1999
Montreal Alouettes	8	13	21	2023
Calgary Stampeders	8	9	17	2018
BC Lions	6	4	10	2011
Saskatchewan Roughriders	5	15	20	2025

The Toronto Argonauts have won the most Grey Cup championships (19), followed by the Edmonton Elks (15) and Winnipeg Blue Bombers (12). The Winnipeg Blue Bombers have made the most Grey Cup appearances (29). The Tiger-Cats remain the only team yet to win this millennium. Since the merger and creation of the Canadian Football League began in 1958, the Elks (formerly Eskimos) have won the most Grey Cup Championships (12) and have made the most Grey Cup appearances (20). The Winnipeg Blue Bombers have the most Grey Cup losses (17). The defending champions are the Saskatchewan Roughriders who won the 112th Grey Cup in 2025, their first title in 12 years. Six teams in CFL history have won the Grey Cup at home, the 2013 Saskatchewan Roughriders, the 2012 Toronto Argonauts, the 2011 BC Lions, the 1994 BC Lions, the 1977 Montreal Alouettes, and 1972 Hamilton Tiger-Cats.

Individually, three players have won seven Grey Cups: Jack Wedley (Toronto, Montreal Navy), Bill Stevenson (Edmonton) and Hank Ilesic (Edmonton, Toronto). Ilesic is one of seven players to appear in nine Grey Cup games. Among quarterbacks, Anthony Calvillo appeared in a record eight games, winning three. Five coaches share the record for Grey Cup championships at five: Wally Buono (the CFL's all-time leader in total games won), Don Matthews, Frank Clair, Hugh Campbell and Lew Hayman.

Two individual awards are handed out following each game. The Most Valuable Player award is given to the top performer in the Grey Cup. Between 1974 and 1990, the league named both offensive and defensive most valuable players. Three people have been named MVP on three occasions: Doug Flutie, Damon Allen and Sonny Wade. The Dick Suderman Trophy is given to the most valuable Canadian. It is named in honour of Dick Suderman, who died of a brain hemorrhage in 1972 while an active player for the Edmonton Eskimos. Dave Sapunjis and Don Sweet have each won the award three times (however, Sapunjis is the only player to win the award in back-to-back years). Andrew Harris was the first person to win both awards in the 107th Grey Cup for the Winnipeg Blue Bombers.

== Venue ==
=== Host cities ===
The city of Toronto has hosted the most Grey Cup games with 48, including 30 of the first 45 games played. The first game was held on December 4, 1909, at Rosedale Field. Hamilton and Ottawa hosted several early games while Sarnia and Kingston each hosted one as the game's early years were dominated by teams in southern Ontario. The Grey Cup game and champion first left the province in 1931, when Montreal hosted the event and the Montreal AAA Winged Wheelers won the 19th Grey Cup. The game did not leave central Canada until 1955 when the 43rd Grey Cup was played in Vancouver. That contest achieved what was at the time an all-time Canadian football attendance record of 39,491. It was the first of 16 games hosted by the British Columbian city, second among all host cities.

The four highest attended Grey Cup games have been held at the Olympic Stadium in Montreal, with an all-time record of 68,318 set in 1977.

Grey Cup host cities
City	Games	First	Last	Next
Toronto	48	1909	2016	
Vancouver	16	1955	2024	
Hamilton	12	1910	2023	
Ottawa	9	1925	2017	
Montreal	8	1931	2008	
Edmonton	5	1984	2018	
Calgary	5	1975	2019	2026
Winnipeg	5	1991	2025	
Regina	4	1995	2022	2027
Kingston	1	1922	1922	
Sarnia	1	1933	1933	

The 1940 Grey Cup was a two-game series. Toronto and Ottawa each hosted a game.

=== Stadiums ===
22 separate stadiums have hosted the Grey Cup. The following lists stadiums which have hosted Grey Cups. Scheduled future Grey Cups are noted in italics.

Stadium	Location	No. hosted	Years hosted
Varsity Stadium	Toronto	30	1911, 1914, 1915, 1920, 1921, 1923, 1924, 1926, 1927, 1930, 1934, 1936, 1937, 1938, 1940, 1941, 1942, 1943, 1945, 1946, 1947, 1948, 1949, 1950, 1951, 1952, 1953, 1954, 1956, 1957
Exhibition Stadium	Toronto	12	1959, 1961, 1962, 1964, 1965, 1968, 1970, 1973, 1976, 1978, 1980, 1982
BC Place	Vancouver	10	1983, 1986, 1987, 1990, 1994, 1999, 2005, 2011, 2014, 2024
Hamilton Amateur Athletic Association Grounds	Hamilton	7	1910, 1912, 1913, 1928, 1929, 1932, 1935
Empire Stadium	Vancouver	7	1955, 1958, 1960, 1963, 1966, 1971, 1974
TD Place Stadium formerly Lansdowne Park and Frank Clair Stadium	Ottawa	7	1925, 1939, 1940, 1967, 1988, 2004, 2017
Olympic Stadium	Montreal	6	1977, 1979, 1981, 1985, 2001, 2008
Commonwealth Stadium	Edmonton	5	1984, 1997, 2002, 2010, 2018
McMahon Stadium	Calgary	5 (6)	1975, 1993, 2000, 2009, 2019, 2026
Rogers Centre formerly SkyDome	Toronto	4	1989, 1992, 2007, 2012
Canad Inns Stadium formerly Winnipeg Stadium	Winnipeg	3	1991, 1998, 2006
Ivor Wynne Stadium formerly Civic Stadium	Hamilton	3	1944, 1972, 1996
Taylor Field	Regina	3	1995, 2003, 2013
Athletic Park	Sarnia	1	1933
Autostade	Montreal	1	1969
BMO Field	Toronto	1	2016
Princess Auto Stadium formerly Investors Group Field	Winnipeg	2	2015, 2025
Percival Molson Memorial Stadium	Montreal	1	1931
Richardson Memorial Stadium	Kingston	1	1922
Rosedale Field	Toronto	1	1909
Tim Hortons Field	Hamilton	2	2021, 2023
Mosaic Stadium	Regina	1 (2)	2022, 2027

^: Stadium is now demolished.
†: The original stadium, which hosted the Grey Cup, was demolished and replaced with a new stadium of the same name

The 1940 Grey Cup was a two-game series. Varsity Stadium and Lansdowne Park each hosted a game.

== Broadcasting ==
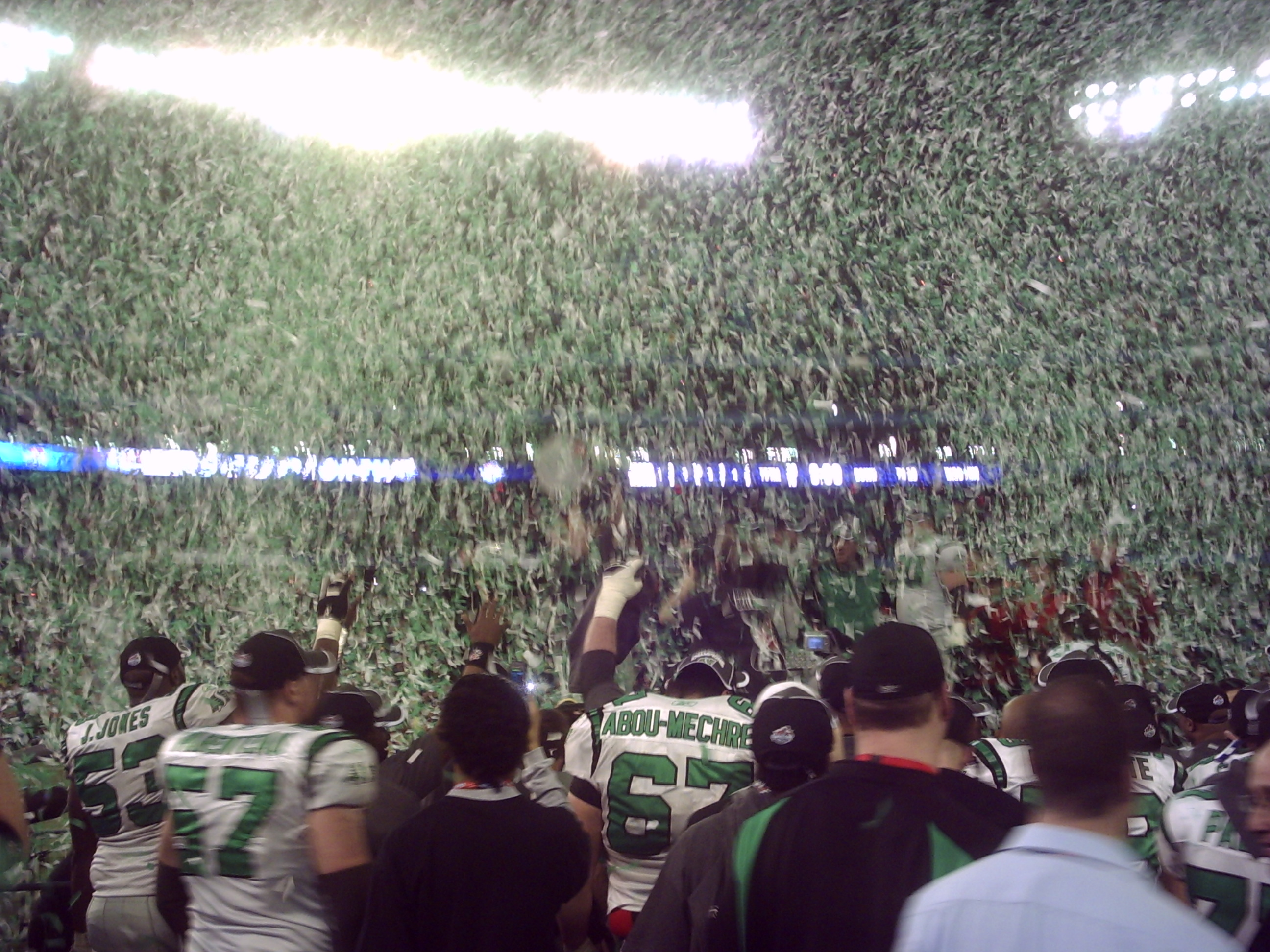
The Saskatchewan Roughriders celebrate their 2007 Grey Cup victory in Toronto.

The Grey Cup game was first broadcast on radio in 1928. The first live national radio broadcast took place on 7 December 1935, when the Canadian Radio Broadcasting Commission (CRBC) carried the game between the Winnipeg 'Pegs and Hamilton Tigers, with Frank Shaughnessy providing commentary.

The Canadian Broadcasting Corporation (CBC) took over national radio coverage in 1936. Among the broadcasters who called Grey Cup games was Wes McKnight of Toronto's CFRB, who covered the championship for more than 30 years. By the 1960s, the CBC's broadcasts were carried by dozens of English- and French-language radio stations across Canada. The CBC continued its radio coverage until 1986, when a network of private broadcasters took over.

Canadian television was in its infancy in 1952 when Toronto's CBLT paid $7,500 for the rights to carry the first televised broadcast of a Grey Cup game. Within two years, it was estimated that 80 percent of the nation's 900,000 television sets were tuned into the game, even though the first national telecast did not occur until 1957. The Grey Cup continues to be one of Canada's most-viewed sporting events. The 1962 "Fog Bowl" game was the first Grey Cup to be broadcast on American television.

The CBC carried the first national telecasts exclusively, but the CTV Television Network purchased rights to the 1962 game. The move sparked concern across Canada as the newly formed network was not yet available in many parts of the country. The debate over whether an "event of national interest" should be broadcast by the publicly funded the CBC or private broadcasters reached the floor of Parliament as members of the federal government weighed in. It was decided that both networks would carry the game. The two networks continued with the simulcast arrangement until 1986 when CTV ceased its coverage.

The CFL operated the Canadian Football Network, a coalition of private broadcasters that shared league games and the Grey Cup with the CBC, from 1987 to 1990. The CBC then broadcast the championship game alone until 2007, when the CFL sold exclusive rights to all games, including the Grey Cup, to specialty channel The Sports Network (TSN) and its French-language sister station Réseau des sports (RDS), a deal that was criticized by Canadians without cable access. Nonetheless, TSN and RDS achieved a record audience for the 2009 Grey Cup, with 6.1 million Canadians watching the game in its entirety, and over 14 million viewing at least part of the contest. Viewership has declined in recent years, and in 2014, about 33%, of Canadians watched at least some of the game, peaking at 5.1 million viewers in the fourth quarter.

Since TSN became the Canadian Football League's exclusive broadcast partner in 2009, Paul Graham produced coverage for all Grey Cup games until 2024. By 2018, Grey Cup coverage included a crew of 200 people and utilized 40 cameras including super slow motion cameras for instant replays, and a camera mounted on the referee.

== See also ==
- List of awards named after governors general of Canada
- List of Grey Cup-winning head coaches
- Super Bowl, the American equivalent hosted by the NFL
