= 1943 in Canadian football =

The Winnipeg RCAF Bombers faced the Hamilton Flying Wildcats in the Grey Cup. Hamilton proved to be the better team, returning the coveted trophy to Steeltown for the first time since 1932.

== Canadian football news in 1943 ==
The WIFU and the IRFU suspended operations for the duration of World War II.

== Regular season ==
=== Final regular season standings ===
Note: GP = Games played, W = Wins, L = Losses, T = Ties, PF = Points for, PA = Points against, Pts = points

Western Interprovincial Football Union

- No league play

Interprovincial Rugby Football Union

- No league play

Ontario Rugby Football Union
Team	GP	W	L	T	PF	PA	Pts
**Hamilton Flying Wildcats**	10	8	1	1	223	71	17
**Toronto Balmy Beach Beachers**	10	8	2	0	148	74	16
Toronto RCAF Hurricanes	10	7	2	1	133	67	15
Ottawa Combines	9	2	7	0	68	129	4
Toronto HMCS York Bulldogs	10	2	8	0	73	160	4
Toronto Indians	9	1	8	0	36	180	2

Quebec Rugby Football Union
Team	GP	W	L	T	PF	PA	Pts
**Lachine RCAF**	10	8	2	0	161	59	20
Verdun Grads	10	7	3	0	90	54	18
St. Hyacinthe-Donnacona Navy	10	6	4	0	61	43	16
McGill*	4	1	3	0	24	20	6
Huntington Army	10	0	10	0	30	163	0

(*) McGill played six-point games.

Western Canada Armed Services Rugby Football Union
Team	GP	W	L	T	PF	PA	Pts
**Winnipeg RCAF Bombers**	6	6	0	0	102	37	12
**Regina All-Services Roughriders**	6	2	4	0	46	96	4
Winnipeg United Services Combines	6	1	5	0	34	49	2

- Bold text means that they had clinched the playoffs.

== Grey Cup playoffs ==
Note: All dates in 1943

=== ORFU final ===
Hamilton Flying Wildcats vs Toronto
Date	Away	Home
November 13	Hamilton Flying Wildcats 7	Toronto 2

=== Eastern finals ===
Hamilton Flying Wildcats @ Lachine RCAF
Date	Away	Home
November 20	Hamilton Flying Wildcats 7	Lachine RCAF 6

== Playoff bracket ==
Union finals
ORFU	Hamilton Flying Wildcats	7
ORFU	Toronto Balmy Beach	2
EAST
QRFU	Lachine RCAF	14
QRFU	Montreal Navy	2
WCASFL	No Game
WEST
WCASFL	No Game

Semi & Union finals
ORFU	Hamilton Flying Wildcats	7
QRFU	Lachine RCAF	6
WCASFL	Winnipeg RCAF Bombers	1-11
WCASFL	Regina All-Service All Stars	0-0

Grey Cup final
ORFU	Hamilton Flying Wildcats	23
WCASFL	Winnipeg RCAF Bombers	14

== Grey Cup Championship ==
November 27 31st Annual Grey Cup Game: Varsity Stadium - Toronto, Ontario
Hamilton Flying Wildcats 23	Winnipeg RCAF Bombers 14
The Hamilton Flying Wildcats were the 1943 Grey Cup Champions.

- Note: Playoff dates are not confirmed; however, since the Grey Cup dates are accurate, it is reasonable to assume the above dates are accurate.

== 1943 Western Canada Armed Services Rugby Football League All-Stars ==
Note: During this time, most players played both ways, so the All-Star selections do not distinguish between some offensive and defensive positions.

- QB – Lt. Lee Sherman, Winnipeg United Services
- FW – Ches McCance, Winnipeg RCAF Bombers
- HB – LAC Ken Charlton, Regina All Services All-Stars
- HB – LAC Johnny Lake, Winnipeg RCAF Bombers
- HB – Cpl. Paul Gates, Winnipeg United Services
- E – Cpl. Don Durno, Winnipeg RCAF Bombers
- E – AC2 Cliff McFayden, Winnipeg RCAF Bombers
- C – Lt. Mel Wilson, Winnipeg United Services
- G – Les Lear, Winnipeg RCAF Bombers
- G – Bill Ceretti, Winnipeg United Services
- T – Lou Mogol, Winnipeg United Services
- T – Cpl. Rube Ludwig, Winnipeg RCAF Bombers

== 1943 Ontario Rugby Football Union All-Stars ==
Note: During this time, most players played both ways, so the All-Star selections do not distinguish between some offensive and defensive positions.

- QB – Annis Stukus, Toronto Balmy Beach Beachers
- FW – Sam Sward, Toronto Balmy Beach Beachers
- HB – Joe Krol, Hamilton Flying Wildcats
- HB – OS Royal Copeland, Toronto HMCS York Bulldogs
- DB – Sgt. Fred Kijek, Toronto RCAF Hurricanes
- E – Jack Buckmaster, Toronto RCAF Hurricanes
- E – Jimmy Simpson, Hamilton Flying Wildcats
- C – Bob Cosgrove, Toronto RCAF Hurricanes
- G – Ed Remegis, Hamilton Flying Wildcats
- G – George Fraser, Ottawa Combines
- T – Harry Sonshine, Toronto Balmy Beach Beachers
- T – none

== 1943 Canadian football awards ==
- Frank Lennard Memorial Trophy - Edward Remigis as Wildcats team MVP
- Jeff Russel Memorial Trophy (IRFU MVP) – no award given due to World War II
- Imperial Oil Trophy (ORFU MVP) - Bob Cosgrove - Toronto RCAF Hurricanes
