= Jake Gaudaur =

Canadian football player (1920–2007)

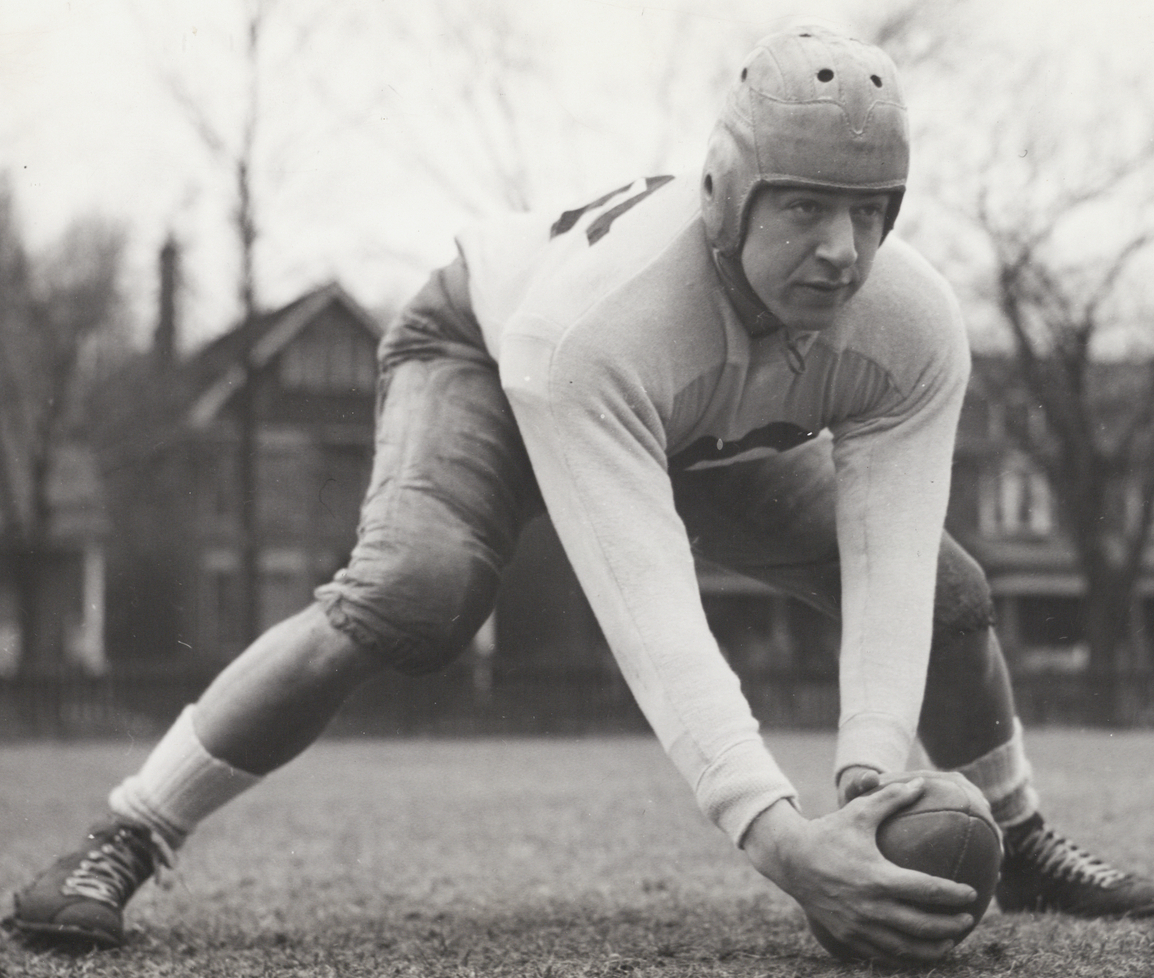
- Jake "Jacob Gill jr" Gaudaur, c. 1942

Profile
- Positions: Center, Linebacker

Personal information
- Born: October 5, 1920; Orillia, Ontario, Canada
- Died: December 4, 2007 (aged 87); Burlington, Ontario, Canada
- Listed height: 6 ft 2 in (1.88 m)
- Listed weight: 240 lb (109 kg)

Career history

Playing
- 1940: Hamilton Tigers
- 1941: Toronto Argonauts
- 1942: Toronto RCAF Hurricanes
- 1943: Ottawa Combines
- 1944: Camp Borden RCAF Hurricanes
- 1945–1946: Toronto Indians
- 1947: Montreal Alouettes
- 1948–1949: Hamilton Tigers
- 1950–1953: Hamilton Tiger-Cats

Operations
- 1954–1955: Hamilton Tiger-Cats (President)
- 1956–1967: Hamilton Tiger-Cats (Pres. & GM)
- 1968–1984: CFL Commissioner

Awards and highlights
- 2× Grey Cup champion (1942, 1953)
- Canadian Football Hall of Fame (Class of 1984)

Jacob Gill Gaudaur, Jr., OC (October 5, 1920 – December 4, 2007) was a Canadian Football League (CFL) player, executive, and commissioner. His 45-year career in Canadian football, including 16 years as the league's fourth commissioner (and its longest-serving commissioner), oversaw the start of the modern era of professional Canadian football. As an amateur artist, Gaudaur made two important contributions, designing both the Hamilton Tiger-Cats "Leaping Tiger" logo, as well as an early version of the CFL logo. With Ralph Sazio, he co-wrote "The Tiger-Cat Marching Song", the fight song of the Tiger-Cats.

== Early life ==
Jake Gaudaur, Jr. was born in Orillia, Ontario on October 5, 1920, and was an all-around athlete at Orillia Collegiate Institute. Like his father, Jake Gaudaur Snr., he was a national rowing champion as well as an excellent lacrosse player.

Gaudaur was based at Uplands Air Force Base and served as a RCAF pilot during the Second World War spending the war training more pilots.

== Football career ==
In 1940, aged 19, he began playing football and joined the Hamilton Tigers. The following year he played for the Toronto Argonauts. Gaudaur served as a pilot in the Second World War and won the 30th Grey Cup with the Toronto RCAF Hurricanes in the 1942 season.

Following the war, Gaudaur played for, and was part owner of, the Toronto Indians of the Ontario Rugby Football Union (1945–1946) and then played for the Montreal Alouettes during the 1947 season.

Gaudaur returned to Hamilton to stay in 1948. When the Tigers merged with the Hamilton Flying Wildcats in 1950, Gaudaur became team captain of the resulting Hamilton Tiger-Cats and played through the 1951 season. In 1952, he left the playing field to become director of the team but returned to play a final year in the 1953 season winning the Tiger-Cats first Grey Cup, playing centre.

From 1954, Gaudaur was President of the Tiger-Cats and was President & General Manager from the 1956 season to 1967. The Ti-Cats appeared in 9 Grey Cups over his term as general manager and won in 1957, 1963, 1965, and 1967.

== CFL Commissioner ==
Jake was the 4th Commissioner of the CFL serving from 1968 through 1984. During Jake's first year as Commissioner, CFL adopted a new Constitution. In 1980, Jake negotiated and signed on behalf of CFL a record television contract with Carling-O'Keefe Breweries for $15.6 million which covered a 3-year period (1981–1983). By 1983, CFL signed a record television agreement with Carling-O'Keefe Breweries for $33 million over a 3-year period (1984–1986). When met with a crisis when Nelson Skalbania briefly acquired the Montreal Alouettes, Gaudaur arranged for the league to seize the franchise, rebrand it as the Montreal Concordes, and sell the franchise to a new owner, Charles Bronfman. This, along with the continued television sponsorship, kept the Montreal franchise alive for another five seasons.

"During his 16-year tenure as commissioner, Gaudaur did wonders for the league. By 1983, new television contracts had increased revenue six-fold, while game attendance had nearly doubled. Gaudaur was also instrumental in establishing a Player Pension Plan and aided greatly in the founding of the Canadian Football Hall of Fame and Museum. Above all, he kept the CFL strictly Canadian. Gaudaur was appointed Governor to Canada's Sports Hall of Fame in 1981 and took on the duties of chairman of the board in 1984. His fundraising efforts resulted in a $1.25 million renovation programme for the Hall to make it one of the most advanced institutions of its kind at the time."

In his last season as CFL commissioner, in 1983, Jake took a personal interest developing a close bond between the CFL and The War Amps kicking off a special tradition – the annual CFL PLAYSAFE Award, saluting the League's support of the PLAYSAFE Program which continues today.

== Honours ==
- He was inducted as a builder into the Toronto Argonauts Hall of Fame in 1984.
- He was inducted into the Canadian Football Hall of Fame as a Builder in 1984.
- In 1985, he was made an Officer of the Order of Canada.
- He was inducted into Canada's Sports Hall of Fame (1990).
- The Jake Gaudaur Veterans' Trophy, presented annually to the CFL player "who best demonstrates the attributes of Canada's veterans in times of war, peace and military conflict", was awarded for the first time in 2010.
- In 2012 Jake was inducted into the Hamilton Sports Hall of Fame.

== Personal life ==
Jake had three daughters.

He died in Burlington, Ontario at the age of 87 in 2007 following a long battle with prostate cancer.
