= Don Crowe =

Profile
- Position: Halfback

Personal information
- Born: December 20, 1919; Toronto, Ontario, Canada
- Died: March 16, 1978 (aged 58); Toronto, Ontario, Canada
- Listed height: 5 ft 11 in (1.80 m)
- Listed weight: 190 lb (86 kg)

Career history
- 1949: Toronto Argonauts
- 1951: Ottawa Rough Riders

Awards and highlights
- Grey Cup champion (1942, 1951)

Donald Crowe (December 20, 1919 – March 16, 1978) was a Canadian professional football player who played for the Ottawa Rough Riders and Toronto Argonauts. He won the Grey Cup with the Rough Riders in 1951. Crowe grew up in Toronto and attended Danforth Technical High School, playing junior football there. He also previously played football with the Peterborough Orfuns and the Toronto Balmy Beach Beachers of the Ontario Rugby Football Union. Crowe also played lacrosse and ice hockey for the Peterborough Petes and Canadian Army teams. A Royal Canadian Air Force veteran, Crowe was the a co-captain of the Toronto RCAF Hurricanes team that won the 30th Grey Cup in 1942. In 1999, Crowe was inducted into the Peterborough & District Sports Hall of Fame.
