= Lew Hayman =

American basketball player-coach (1908–1984)

Profile
- Positions: Head coach, General manager

Personal information
- Born: September 30, 1908; New York City, New York, U.S.
- Died: June 28, 1984 (aged 75); Toronto, Ontario, Canada

Career history

Coaching
- 1932–1940: Toronto Argonauts
- 1942–1943: Toronto RCAF Hurricanes
- 1944: Camp Borden RCAF Hurricanes
- 1946–1954: Montreal Alouettes

Operations
- 1946–1954: Montreal Alouettes (GM)
- 1955–1983: Toronto Argonauts

Awards and highlights
- 5× Grey Cup champion coach – 1933, 1937, 1938, 1942, 1949
- Canadian Football Hall of Fame (Class of 1975)

Lewis Edward Hayman (September 30, 1908 – June 28, 1984) was an American sports figure. He was one of the driving forces behind the Canadian Football League as coach, general manager, team president, and league president. As head coach, he was a five-time Grey Cup winner with three different teams; he was the only person to win with three different teams until Don Matthews matched him in 1996 and eclipsed him in 2002. Hayman was a pioneer in bringing African Americans into the CFL, hiring one of professional football's first Black players, Herb Trawick, and coach Willie Wood. He was inducted into the Ontario Sports Hall of Fame in 2004.

== Early life ==
Hayman was born to a Jewish family in New York City and grew up in Paterson, New Jersey. He attended high school at New York Military Academy and was a star basketball player at Syracuse University, where he was a three-year starter and named College Humor third team All-American in 1931.

== Moves to Canada ==
After graduating from college, Hayman moved to Canada in 1932 to become assistant coach of the University of Toronto football team under Warren Stevens. He was also head coach of the university's men's basketball team from 1933 to 1935. He was also hired as an assistant to coach Buck McKenna with the Toronto Argonauts football team. When McKenna took ill during the 1932 season, Hayman became interim head coach. He was given the job outright for the 1933 season and, at the age of 25, guided the Argonauts to a Grey Cup championship. He followed that with back-to-back Grey Cup wins in 1937 and 1938.

With World War II escalating, the major Canadian football leagues halted operations following the 1941 season and Hayman joined the Royal Canadian Air Force as a flying officer. He was made coach of Toronto's RCAF football team and led the Toronto RCAF Hurricanes to the 1942 Grey Cup championship. He was discharged after the war, having reached the rank of flight lieutenant.

Hayman thought he had an agreement with the Argonauts to return as head coach when play resumed in 1945, but the deal fell through and Ted Morris was hired instead. That left Hayman with bitter feelings toward his former team—which admitted that they had misled him—and Hayman had to settle for a job as coach of the Toronto Indians football team. One of the members of the Indians was future CFL commissioner Jake Gaudaur, who had also played under Hayman in the RCAF.

== Forms the Montreal Alouettes ==
The following season, Hayman partnered with Eric Cradock and Leo Dandurand to form the Montreal Alouettes CFL team, with Hayman as head coach and general manager, as well as part-owner. In his first season, he broke the league's color barrier by signing Herb Trawick, an African American lineman. Other innovations introduced by the Alouettes under Hayman were playing night games, scheduling games on Sundays, and allowing games to be televised.

During the off-season in 1946, Hayman became general manager of the Toronto Huskies professional basketball team, the first Canadian-based team in what evolved into the National Basketball Association (known at the time as the Basketball Association of America). When the team's first coach quit a month into the season, Hayman took his place for one game, and is in the record books as having been an NBA coach for that single game. The Huskies disbanded after one money-losing season.

Hayman led the Alouettes to their first Grey Cup in 1949 — Hayman's fifth and final Grey Cup as head coach. Following the 1951 season, Hayman stepped down as coach but continued as general manager until the end of the 1954 season. Following the latter, he sold his share of the Alouettes and moved back to Toronto to become a stockbroker.

== Returns to the Argonauts ==
Hayman's career outside of football was short-lived, as he became managing director of the Argonauts in 1956. Despite his previous success as head coach, the Argonauts were largely reduced to being Eastern Conference doormats through this period, finishing last in their division nine times in 11 years from 1956 to 1966 before returning to respectability. During that time, Hayman also became team president. He was elected president of the CFL in 1969 and served a one-year term.

After John Barrow was made general manager of the Argonauts in 1972, Hayman was given the title of executive consultant. He was planning to retire when the season ended, but was persuaded by owner John W. H. Bassett to sign a three-year contract as team president, followed by 10 years as vice-chairman and director. Hayman again became president of the Argonauts in 1979 and remained in that role until he was succeeded by Ralph Sazio during the 1981 season. He died in 1984 at age 75.

Hayman was elected to the Canadian Football Hall of Fame in 1975. The CFL award presented to the outstanding Canadian player in the East Division is called the Lew Hayman Trophy. In 2004, he was inducted into the International Jewish Sports Hall of Fame.

== Head coaching record ==
Legend
| Regular season | G | Games coached | W | Games won | L | Games lost | W–L % | Win–loss % |
| Playoffs | PG | Playoff games | PW | Playoff wins | PL | Playoff losses | PW–L % | Playoff win–loss % |

| Team | Year | G | W | L | W–L% | Finish | PG | PW | PL | PW–L% | Result |
|---|---|---|---|---|---|---|---|---|---|---|---|
| Toronto | 1946–47 | 1 | 0 | 1 | .000 | (interim) | — | — | — | — | — |

== Sources ==
- "Lew Hayman devoted his life to pro football," Rex McLeod, Toronto Star, July 2, 1984, p. C16.
- "Lew Hayman," International Jewish Sports Hall of Fame, accessed November 4, 2006
