= Eddie Thompson (Canadian football) =

Canadian football player

Profile
- Positions: Halfback, kicker, quarterback

Personal information
- Born: May 21, 1917; Toronto, Ontario, Canada
- Died: April 22, 1943 (aged 25); At sea

Career information
- College: Oakwood Collegiate

Career history
- 1937–39: Toronto Balmy Beach Beachers
- 1940: Camp Borden
- 1942: Toronto RCAF Hurricanes

Awards and highlights
- Grey Cup champion (1942); Imperial Oil Trophy (1939); 3× CFL All-Star (1938, 1939, 1940)

Eddie Thompson (May 21, 1917 –- April 22, 1943) was a halfback in the Ontario Rugby Football Union. He served in World War II and lost his life during it.

== Biography ==
Thompson played for his hometown Toronto Balmy Beach Beachers from 1937 to 1939, and was a two time all-star and winner of the Imperial Oil Trophy in 1939 as the ORFU Most Valuable Player. He enlisted in the Canadian Forces in 1940 and played football with Camp Borden in 1940.

In 1942 he was co-captain of the famed Toronto RCAF Hurricanes team. He scored 51 points in 1942 and was a key player on the Grey Cup champions.

Flight Lieutenant Edward Blake Thompson was reported "missing in action at sea" on April 22, 1943, and was later presumed dead.

== See also ==
- List of people who disappeared mysteriously at sea
