= Frank Stukus =

Profile
- Position: Fullback

Personal information
- Born: 1918; Toronto, Ontario, Canada
- Died: July 2001 (aged 82–83)

Career information
- College: Central Technical School

Career history
- 1938–39, 41: Toronto Argonauts
- 1942: Toronto Indians
- 1943–44: Toronto Balmy Beach Beachers
- 1945–46: Toronto Indians

Awards and highlights
- Grey Cup champion (1938)

Frank Stukus (1918 – 2001) was a Canadian professional football fullback and a Grey Cup champion.

Only 19 years old when he joined his brothers with the Toronto Argonauts, Stukus won a Grey Cup in 1938. He played three seasons with the Boatmen, playing 18 regular season and 7 playoff games. Though suffering with a long time knee injury, he played in the Ontario Rugby Football Union with the Toronto Indians and the Toronto Balmy Beach Beachers. He finished his career the Toronto Indians, buying the team and playing two more seasons.

Frank was one of three noted Stukus brothers: both Annis Stukus and Bill Stukus also were the Grey Cup champions. While with the Argonauts all three played in the backfield at the same time, and won the Grey Cup together in 1938.

Stukus later became active in the Progressive Conservative Party. He died in July 2001, aged 83, pre-deceased by his first wife Anna and his son Frank Jr., and survived by wife Audrey, daughter Maureen and grandchildren Robert and Anna.
