= Stukus =

Stukus is a surname. Notable people with the surname include:

- Annis Stukus (1914–2006), Canadian football player, coach, and manager
- Bill Stukus (1916–2003), Canadian football quarterback
- Frank Stukus (1918–2001), Canadian football fullback, brother of Annis and Bill
