= Eric Chipper =

Canadian football player (1915–1996)

Profile
- Positions: Halfback & Lineman

Personal information
- Born: 1915
- Died: 1996 (aged 80–81)

Career information
- College: none - Ottawa Strathcona (Jr.)

Career history
- 1938–42: Ottawa Rough Riders
- 1943: Ottawa Combines
- 1944: Ottawa Trojans
- 1945–50: Ottawa Rough Riders

Awards and highlights
- Grey Cup champion (1940); Jeff Russel Memorial Trophy (1948); CFL All-Star (1945)

Eric Chipper (1915–1996) was an all-star and Grey Cup champion Canadian football player, playing from 1938 to 1950.

Starting with the Ottawa Rough Riders in 1938, Chipper played halfback and (when George Fraser retired) was a league leading kicker. He won the Grey Cup in 1940. During the war years he played in the Ontario Rugby Football Union, with the Ottawa Combines in 1943 and the Ottawa Trojans in 1944. In 1945 he was selected as an all-star and in 1948 he won the Jeff Russel Memorial Trophy as the best player in the Interprovincial Rugby Football Union, on the strength of his 37 points (1 touchdown, 3 field goals, and 23 converts.)
