= Bill Stukus =

Canadian football player

Profile
- Positions: Quarterback, Safety

Personal information
- Born: May 15, 1916; Toronto, Ontario, Canada
- Died: June 19, 2003 (aged 87); Toronto, Ontario, Canada
- Listed height: 5 ft 9 in (1.75 m)
- Listed weight: 175 lb (79 kg)

Career information
- College: St. Michael's

Career history
- 1936–1941: Toronto Argonauts
- 1942–1943: Toronto RCAF Hurricanes
- 1945–1946: Toronto Indians
- 1947: Toronto Argonauts
- 1949–1951: Edmonton Eskimos

Awards and highlights
- 4× Grey Cup champion (1937, 1938, 1942, 1947); Imperial Oil Trophy (1942); 3× CFL All-Star (1939, 1942, 1945)

William Stukus (May 15, 1916 – June 19, 2003) was a Canadian professional football quarterback.

Stukus started with the Toronto Argonauts, winning a Grey Cup in 1937 and 1938, and being named an all-star. Perhaps his best season was in 1942, with the wartime all-military Toronto RCAF Hurricanes, when he was an all-star, won a third Grey Cup and was the Ontario Rugby Football Union Imperial Oil Trophy winner as MVP. He played with the Toronto Indians and then returned to the Argonauts in 1947, winning his fourth Grey Cup. He played 48 regular season and 17 playoff games for the Argos. He finished his career playing three seasons with the Edmonton Eskimos.

While serving in the RCAF during the war, he also had the good fortune to play in the famed Tea Bowl, where the Canadian Army football team defeated the American Army team 16–6 at White City Stadium on February 13, 1944 in London, England.

Bill was one of the famed Stukus brothers. Bill and his brothers Annis and Frank played together in the offensive backfield of the 1938 Grey Cup champion Argonaut team.
