= Tommy Waldon =

Canadian football player (born 1923)

Profile
- Position: Quarterback

Personal information
- Born: 1923 (age 102–103)

Career history
- 1945–1946: Toronto Argonauts

Awards and highlights
- Grey Cup champion (1945, 1946)

Thomas A. Waldon (born 1923) is a former Canadian football player who played for the Toronto Argonauts. He won the Grey Cup with them in 1945 and 1946. He played football at the University of Toronto and for the Toronto Balmy Beach Beachers. He also played for the Hamilton Tiger Cats, a team that compensated players, exceptional for the time. Despite poor eyesight, Tommy returned punts as well as playing QB, and in later life attributed his good hearing (“I’d listen for the ball to hit the ground and run towards the sound.”)to his punt return success. Tom was one of the first players to wear (glass) contact lenses on the field.

In 2013, he retired to Quesnel, British Columbia after a career in education and sales.
