= 1941 in Canadian football =

The Winnipeg Blue Bombers were again permitted to challenge for the Grey Cup following a rule dispute a year earlier. In a meeting of the previous two Grey Cup champions, the Blue Bombers prevailed, sending the coveted mug west for the third time.

== Canadian football news in 1941 ==
The Calgary Bronks left the WIFU and the Vancouver Grizzlies joined. The IRFU was renamed to Eastern Canada Union for one season.

The Hamilton Tigers did not participate in the Eastern Canada Union, due to World War II. The Toronto Balmy Beach Beachers of the ORFU joined. The Tigers would resume play in 1945.

== Regular season ==
=== Final regular season standings ===
Note: GP = Games played, W = Wins, L = Losses, T = Ties, PF = Points for, PA = Points against, Pts = Points

Western Interprovincial Football Union
Team	GP	W	L	T	PF	PA	Pts
**Winnipeg Blue Bombers**	8	6	2	0	92	19	12
**Regina Roughriders**	8	5	3	0	64	43	10
Vancouver Grizzlies	8	1	7	0	15	109	2

Eastern Canada Union
Team	GP	W	L	T	PF	PA	Pts
**Ottawa Rough Riders**	6	5	1	0	72	21	10
**Toronto Argonauts**	6	5	1	0	66	42	10
Toronto Balmy Beach Beachers	6	2	4	0	27	34	4
Montreal Bulldogs	6	0	6	0	12	80	0

Ontario Rugby Football Union
Team	GP	W	L	T	PF	PA	Pts
**Hamilton Wildcats**	6	5	0	1	122	28	11
Toronto Indians	6	2	2	2	46	55	6
Kitchener-Waterloo Panthers	6	0	5	1	30	115	1

- Bold text means that they had clinched the playoffs.

== Grey Cup playoffs ==
Note: All dates in 1941

=== League Finals ===
WIFU Finals
Winnipeg Blue Bombers @ Regina Roughriders
Game	Date	Away	Home
1	November 8	Winnipeg Blue Bombers 6	**Regina Roughriders 8**
2	November 11	Regina Roughriders 12	**Winnipeg Blue Bombers 18**
3	November 15	Regina Roughriders 2	**Winnipeg Blue Bombers 8**

- Winnipeg won the total-point series by 32–22. Winnipeg advanced to the Grey Cup game.

IRFU Finals
Toronto Argonauts @ Ottawa Rough Riders
Game	Date	Away	Home
1	November 8	**Toronto Argonauts 16**	Ottawa Rough Riders 8
2	November 15	**Ottawa Rough Riders 10**	Toronto Argonauts 1

- Ottawa won the total-point series by 18–17. Ottawa would play the Hamilton Wildcats (ORFU Champions) in the Eastern Finals.

=== Eastern Finals ===
Hamilton Wildcats (ORFU) @ Ottawa Rough Riders
Date	Away	Home
November 22	Hamilton Wildcats (ORFU) 2	**Ottawa Rough Riders 7**

- Ottawa advanced to the Grey Cup game.

== Playoff bracket ==
**Quarterfinals**
ERFU	Ottawa Rough Riders	8-10
ERFU	Toronto Argonauts	16-1
**EAST**
ORFU	Hamilton Wildcats
ORFU	BYE
WIFU	Winnipeg Blue Bombers
WIFU	BYE
**WEST**
WIFU	Regina Roughriders
WIFU	BYE

**Semifinals**
ERFU	Ottawa Rough Riders	7
ORFU	Hamilton Wildcats	2
WIFU	Winnipeg Blue Bombers	6-18-8
WIFU	Regina Roughriders	8-12-2

**Grey Cup final**
ERFU	Ottawa Rough Riders	16
WIFU	Winnipeg Blue Bombers	18

== Grey Cup Championship ==
November 29 29th Annual Grey Cup Game: Varsity Stadium – Toronto, Ontario
WIFU Champion	IRFU Champion
**Winnipeg Blue Bombers 18**	Ottawa Rough Riders 16
**The Winnipeg Blue Bombers were the 1941 Grey Cup Champions.**

== 1941 All Eastern Rugby Football Union All-Stars ==
Note: During this time most players played both ways, so the All-Star selections do not distinguish between some offensive and defensive positions.

- QB – Bill Stukus, Toronto Argonauts
- HB – Stan O'Neil, Ottawa Rough Riders
- HB – Bobby Coulter, Toronto Argonauts
- DHB - Tony Golab, Ottawa Rough Riders
- FW – Sammy Sward, Toronto Balmy Beach Beachers
- E – Jack Wedley, Toronto Argonauts
- E – Tony McCarthy, Ottawa Rough Riders
- C – Curly Moynahan, Ottawa Rough Riders
- G – George Fraser, Ottawa Rough Riders
- G – Len Staughton, Ottawa Rough Riders
- T – Bob Cosgrove, Toronto Argonauts
- T – Paul McGarry, Ottawa Rough Riders

== 1941 Western All-Stars ==
Note: During this time most players played both ways, so the All-Star selections do not distinguish between some offensive and defensive positions.

- QB – Art Stevenson, Winnipeg Blue Bombers
- FW – Ken Charlton, Regina Roughriders
- HB – Fritz Hanson, Winnipeg Blue Bombers
- HB – Jim Ladner, Winnipeg Blue Bombers
- FB – Dan Capraru, Regina Roughriders
- E – Larry Haynes, Vancouver Grizzlies
- E – Ches McCance, Winnipeg Blue Bombers
- C – Mel Wilson, Winnipeg Blue Bombers
- G – Maurice Williams, Regina Roughriders
- G – Les Lear, Winnipeg Blue Bombers
- T – Gord Gellhaye, Vancouver Grizzlies
- T – Lou Mogul, Winnipeg Blue Bombers

== 1941 Canadian Football Awards ==
- Jeff Russel Memorial Trophy (IRFU MVP) - Tony Golab (RB), Ottawa Rough Riders
- Imperial Oil Trophy (ORFU MVP) - Al Lenard - Hamilton Wildcats
