= 1942 in Canadian football =

With Canadians serving on battlefields across Europe and the Pacific, the first ever non-civilian Grey Cup took place in 1942. The Toronto RCAF Hurricanes defeated the Winnipeg RCAF Bombers on an icy field at Varsity Stadium in Toronto.

== Canadian football news in 1942 ==
The WIFU and the IRFU suspended operations for the duration of World War II. A couple of military teams based in Toronto, the RCAF Hurricanes and the Navy York Bulldogs, joined the regular ORFU teams like Balmy Beach and the Toronto Indians. The Ottawa Rough Riders continued operation, but as part of an Ottawa-based league. Out West, a three-team Winnipeg city league was formed with the Winnipeg Bombers, the University of Manitoba Bisons and a military team called the RCAF Flyers.

== Regular season ==
=== Final regular season standings ===
Note: GP = Games played, W = Wins, L = Losses, T = Ties, PF = Points for, PA = Points against, Pts = Points

Western Interprovincial Football Union

- No league play

Interprovincial Rugby Football Union

- No league play

Ontario Rugby Football Union
Team	GP	W	L	T	PF	PA	Pts
**Toronto RCAF Hurricanes**	10	8	1	1	180	61	17
**Toronto Balmy Beach Beachers**	10	7	3	0	125	89	14
Hamilton Wildcats	10	6	4	0	119	66	12
Toronto HMCS York Bulldogs	10	5	4	1	94	44	11
Toronto Indians	10	3	7	0	66	113	6
Kitchener-Waterloo Panthers	10	0	10	0	21	222	0

**Ottawa City Rugby Football Union**
Team	GP	W	L	T	PF	PA	Pts
**Ottawa Rough Riders**	4	3	1	0	66	13	6
**Ottawa RCAF Uplands**	4	3	1	0	53	31	6
Ottawa Civil Service	4	0	4	0	8	83	0

Winnipeg City League
Team	GP	W	L	T	PF	PA	Pts
**Winnipeg Bombers**	6	4	1	1	93	30	9
Winnipeg RCAF Flyers	5	3	1	1	60	42	7
University of Manitoba Bisons	5	0	5	0	25	106	0

- Bold text means that they had clinched the playoffs.

== Grey Cup playoffs ==
Note: All dates in 1942

=== Winnipeg City playoffs ===
Bombers vs. RCAF Flyers
Game	Date	Team 1	Team 2
1	October 31	RCAF Flyers 18	Bombers 14
2	November 3	Bombers 20	RCAF Flyers 11

- The Bombers won the total-point series by 34–29.

=== Ottawa City Finals ===
Ottawa RCAF Uplands @ Ottawa Rough Riders
Date	Away	Home
November 21	Ottawa RCAF Uplands 9	Ottawa Rough Riders 0

=== ORFU Finals ===
Toronto Balmy Beach @ Toronto RCAF Hurricanes
Date	Away	Home
November 25	Toronto Balmy Beach 0	Toronto RCAF Hurricanes 24

=== Western Finals ===
Regina Navy @ Winnipeg RCAF Bombers
Date	Away	Home
November 7	Regina Navy 6	Winnipeg RCAF Bombers 13

=== Eastern Finals ===
Toronto RCAF Hurricanes @ Ottawa RCAF Uplands
Date	Away	Home
November 28	Toronto RCAF Hurricanes 18	Ottawa RCAF Uplands 13

== Playoff bracket ==
Union Finals
ORFU	Toronto RCAF Hurricanes	24
ORFU	Toronto Balmy Beach	0
EAST
Ottawa City	Ottawa RCAF Uplands	9
Ottawa City	Ottawa Rough Riders	0
Winnipeg City	Winnipeg RCAF Bombers	14-20
Winnipeg City	Winnipeg RCAF Flyers	18-11
WEST
SRFU	No Game

Semifinals
ORFU	Toronto RCAF Hurricanes	18
Ottawa City	Ottawa RCAF Uplands	13
Winnipeg City	Winnipeg RCAF Bombers	13
SRFU	Regina Navy	6

Grey Cup final
ORFU	Toronto RCAF Hurricanes	8
Winnipeg City	Winnipeg RCAF Bombers	5

== Grey Cup Championship ==
December 5 30th Annual Grey Cup Game: Varsity Stadium - Toronto, Ontario
Toronto RCAF Hurricanes 8	Winnipeg RCAF Bombers 5
Toronto RCAF Hurricanes are the 1942 Grey Cup Champions.

== 1942 Ottawa City Senior Rugby Football Union All-Stars selected by Canadian Press ==
Note: During this time most players played both ways, so the All-Star selections do not distinguish between some offensive and defensive positions.

- QB – P/O Bobby Coulter, Ottawa RCAF Uplands
- FW – Joseph "Curley" Moynahan, Ottawa Rough Riders
- HB – P/O Tony Golab, Ottawa RCAF Uplands
- HB – Tommy Daley, Ottawa Rough Riders
- DB – Arnie McWatters, Ottawa Rough Riders
- DB – Thain Simon, Ottawa RCAF Uplands
- E – Pete O'Conner, Ottawa Rough Riders
- E – Hart Findley, Ottawa RCAF Uplands
- E – Jack Beull, Ottawa RCAF Uplands
- C – Doug Turner, Ottawa RCAF Uplands
- G – Leo Seguin, Ottawa Rough Riders
- G – George Fraser, Ottawa Rough Riders
- T – F/O George Sprague, Ottawa RCAF Uplands
- T – Eric Chipper, Ottawa Rough Riders

== 1942 Canadian Football Awards ==
- Jeff Russel Memorial Trophy (IRFU MVP) – no award given due to World War II
- Imperial Oil Trophy (ORFU MVP) - Bill Stukus - Toronto RCAF Hurricanes
