= Jack Wedley =

Canadian football player

No. 79
- Positions: Offensive End, Defensive halfback

Personal information
- Born: September 15, 1917; England
- Died: September 29, 2003 (aged 85–86); Gilford, Ontario, Canada
- Listed height: 5 ft 10.5 in (1.79 m)
- Listed weight: 160 lb (73 kg)

Career information
- High school: Northern Secondary School (Toronto)

Career history
- 1936: Toronto Balmy Beach Beachers
- 1937–1941: Toronto Argonauts
- 1942: Toronto Navy Bulldogs
- 1943: Halifax Navy
- 1944: St. Hyacinthe-Donnacona Navy
- 1945–1950: Toronto Argonauts
- 1951: Saskatchewan Roughriders

Awards and highlights
- 7× Grey Cup champion (1937, 1938, 1944, 1945, 1946, 1947, 1950); 2× CFL All-Star (1941, 1945)

Jack Wedley (September 15, 1917 – September 29, 2003) was an all-star and Grey Cup champion Canadian football player, playing from 1937 to 1951.

Born in England, Wedley came to Canada in his youth and played playground football with the city champion Moss Park team. After high school, he graduated to the ORFU's Toronto Balmy Beach Beachers.

Starting in 1936 he went on to a record setting career. His first stint with the Toronto Argonauts lasted 5 seasons and netted him a Grey Cup championship. During World War II he played for several Navy teams; Toronto Navy Bulldogs and Halifax Navy, and in 1944 another Grey Cup with St. Hyacinthe-Donnacona Navy. He returned to the Double Blue in 1945 for six more seasons and four more Cups, having played 90 games, 14 playoff games, and six Cup matches for the Boatmen. He finish his career in 1951 with the Saskatchewan Roughriders where he just missed yet another championship with their close Cup defeat.

In all, Wedley collected seven Grey Cup championships, the most by any player until his record was later tied by Bill Stevenson and Hank Ilesic. He was also an all-star in 1941 and 1945 with the Argos.

Wedley would go on to coach junior football, starting with the ORFU Oshawa Raiders intermediate team in 1953.

He died September 29, 2003.
