= Annis Stukus =

Canadian football player and coach (1914–2006)

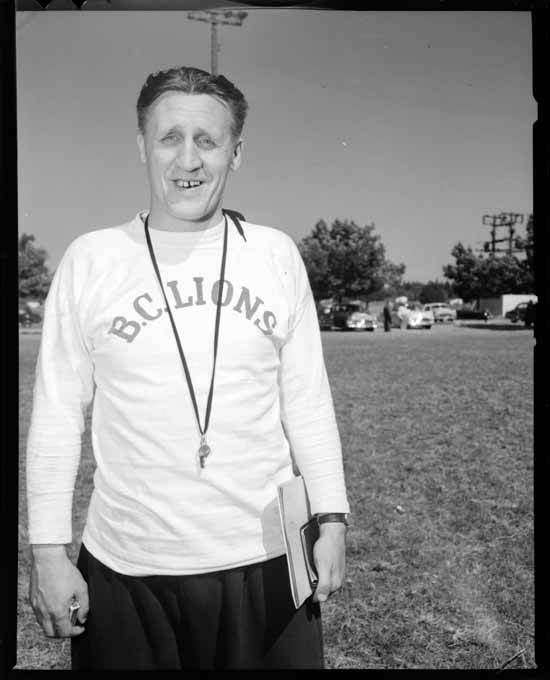
- Stukus in 1954

Profile
- Positions: Quarterback, Kicker

Personal information
- Born: October 25, 1914; Toronto, Ontario, Canada
- Died: May 20, 2006 (aged 91); Canmore, Alberta, Canada
- Listed height: 6 ft 0 in (1.83 m)
- Listed weight: 205 lb (93 kg)

Career history

Playing
- 1935–1941: Toronto Argonauts
- 1942: Toronto/Oakwood Indians
- 1943: Balmy Beach
- 1944: HMCS York Bulldogs
- 1945–1946: Toronto Indians
- 1949–1951: Edmonton Eskimos

Coaching
- 1949–1951: Edmonton Eskimos
- 1953: Vancouver Cubs
- 1954–1955: BC Lions

Operations
- 1954–1955: BC Lions

Awards and highlights
- 2× Grey Cup champion (1937, 1938); 2× CFL All-Star (1938, 1943); Canada's Sports Hall of Fame (1991)
- Canadian Football Hall of Fame (Class of 1974)

Annis Paul Stukus (October 25, 1914 – May 20, 2006) was a Canadian professional football player, journalist, coach, broadcaster, and executive. He was the first head coach of the Edmonton Eskimos and the BC Lions of the Western Interprovincial Football Union (now the West Division of the Canadian Football League) and the first general manager of the Winnipeg Jets of the World Hockey Association.

== Playing ==
Stukus was born in Toronto, Ontario. He played for the Toronto Argonauts from 1935 to 1941, leading the team to Grey Cup victories in 1937 and 1938 (playing 45 regular season and 14 playoff games). He then played for the Oakwood Indians (1942), Balmy Beach (1943), HMCS York Bulldogs (1944) and the Toronto Indians (1945, 1946), all Toronto-based teams. He played alongside his brothers Bill and Frank on the Argonauts and Indians and the trio played together in the offensive backfield of the 1938 Grey Cup champion Argonaut team. After his playing career ended, Stukus became a sportswriter for the Toronto Star.

== Coaching ==
In 1949, Stukus was hired as the head coach of the Edmonton Eskimos, which were reentering the Western Interprovincial Football Union after a ten year absence. He was chosen over Cincinnati Bearcats football coach Ray Nolting due to his knowledge of the Canadian game. Stukus not only assembled a roster from scratch, but promoted the sport throughout the city, leading to the growth of junior and high school football in Edmonton. Edmonton compiled a 4–10 in its inaugural season. The following year, Edmonton went 7–7 and beat the Saskatchewan Roughriders 24 to 1 in the Western Semi-Final. Edmonton defeated the Winnipeg Blue Bombers 17 to 16 in the first game of the Western Finals, but dropped the final two of the best-of-three series. Edmonton finished the 1951 season with an 8–6 record and were eliminated from the postseason by the Roughriders after losing the third game of the Western Finals by a single point. Stukus left at the end of the season to return to the Toronto Star.

In February 1953, Stukus signed a three-year contract to become the first head coach and general manager of Vancouver's expansion football club – the BC Lions. As the Lions would not begin play until 1954, Stukus spent his first in Vancouver promoting the sport. This included putting together an amateur team to play a series of exhibition games. The Lions went 1–15 in 1954 and 5–11 in 1955.

== Journalism ==
Stukus' contract was not renewed after 1955 season and he became a football writer for the Vancouver Sun. In 1958, he became a foreign correspondent for the paper and covered the Second Taiwan Strait Crisis from Quemoy. In 1961, he returned to Toronto as a sportswriter for the Telegram and a commentator for the CFL on CTV. In 1967, he appeared in an episode of Quentin Durgens, M.P. as a member of parliament from Manitoba.

== Front office ==
In 1967, Stukus signed a four-year contract as general manager of the Vancouver Canucks of the minor pro Western Hockey League. The team was preparing to move into the new Pacific Coliseum and was making a push for entry into the National Hockey League. He was fired on June 28, 1968 for "services unsatisfactory" and sued for wrongful termination. Following his dismissal, Stukus was the sports director at CFUN/CKVN and was an unsuccessful candidate for the Social Credit Party in North Vancouver-Seymour during the 1969 British Columbia general election.

From 1971 to 1974, Stukus was the general manager of the Winnipeg Jets of the newly-formed World Hockey Association. He was responsible for team operations, public relations, and season ticket sales.

== Later life ==
After leaving the Jets, Stukus returned to CFUN. He was replaced by Tom Larscheid in 1983.

The CFL's annual award for coach of the year is named in his honour. He was elected into the Canadian Football Hall of Fame and the Canadian Sports Hall of Fame.

He died at his home in Canmore, Alberta, at age 91 on May 20, 2006.

| Preceded by Position created | General Manager of the Winnipeg Jets; 1972–74 | Succeeded by Rudy Pilous |
