= 1945 in Canadian football =

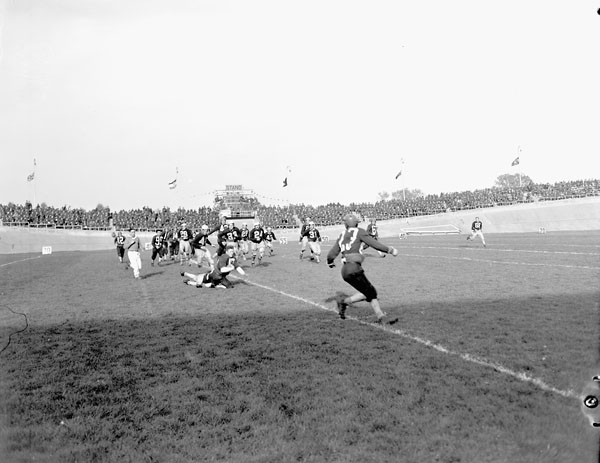
Football game between the 4th Canadian Armoured Division Atoms and the 1st Canadian Army Red and Blue Bombers

Football returned to relative normal in 1945 following the conclusion of World War II. Two rivals from the pre-war years met once again in the annual Grey Cup, but on this occasion, the Winnipeg Blue Bombers were no match for the Toronto Argonauts. For Winnipeg, it was the worst loss by a western team in the Grey Cup since 1923 when Queen's University routed the Regina Roughriders 54–0.

== Canadian Football News in 1945 ==
On Thursday, September 27 a new football team was formed in Calgary. On October 10, it was decided that the new team would play as the Calgary Stampeders. The Stampeders joined the WIFU with blue and gold colours.

The IRFU would resume play, but the WIFU still suspended operations.

== Regular season ==
=== Final regular season standings ===
Note: GP = Games Played, W = Wins, L = Losses, T = Ties, PF = Points For, PA = Points Against, Pts = Points

Western Interprovincial Football Union

- NO LEAGUE PLAY

**Interprovincial Rugby Football Union**
Team	GP	W	L	T	PF	PA	Pts
**Ottawa Rough Riders**	6	5	1	0	105	40	10
**Toronto Argonauts**	6	5	1	0	92	44	10
Hamilton Tigers	6	1	5	0	36	68	2
Montreal Hornets	6	1	5	0	32	113	2

Ontario Rugby Football Union
Team	GP	W	L	T	PF	PA	Pts
**Toronto Indians**	8	7	1	0	124	150	14
**Toronto Balmy Beach Beachers**	8	6	2	0	112	66	12
Ottawa Trojans	7	3	4	0	56	78	6
Hamilton Wildcats	8	3	5	0	60	151	6
Windsor Rockets	7	0	7	0	20	126	0

- Bold text means that they have clinched the playoffs.

== Grey Cup playoffs ==
Note: All dates in 1945

=== Semifinals ===
WIFU semifinals – game 1
Calgary Stampeders @ Regina Roughriders
Date	Away	Home
October 27	**Calgary Stampeders 3**	Regina Roughriders 1

WIFU semifinals – game 2
Regina Roughriders @ Calgary Stampeders
Date	Away	Home
November 3	Regina Roughriders 0	**Calgary Stampeders 12**

=== Finals ===
IRFU Finals – Game 1
Toronto Argonauts @ Ottawa Rough Riders
Date	Away	Home
November 3	**Toronto Argonauts 27**	Ottawa Rough Riders 8

IRFU Finals – Game 2
Toronto Argonauts @ Ottawa Rough Riders
Date	Away	Home
November 10	Toronto Argonauts 6	**Ottawa Rough Riders 10**

- Toronto won the total-point series by 33–18. Toronto will play the Toronto Balmy Beach Beachers (ORFU Champions) in the Eastern finals.

WIFU Finals
Winnipeg Blue Bombers @ Calgary Stampeders
Date	Away	Home
November 10	**Winnipeg Blue Bombers 9**	Calgary Stampeders 6

- Winnipeg advances to the Grey Cup game.

ORFU Finals – Game 1
Toronto Indians @ Toronto Balmy Beach Beachers
Date	Away	Home
November 14	Toronto Indians 1	**Toronto Balmy Beach Beachers 2**

ORFU Finals – Game 2
Toronto Balmy Beach Beachers @ Toronto Indians
Date	Away	Home
November 17	**Toronto Balmy Beach Beachers 15**	Toronto Indians 0

- Toronto won the total-point series by 17–1. Toronto will play the Toronto Argonauts (IRFU Champions) in the Eastern finals.

=== Eastern Finals ===
Toronto Argonauts @ Toronto Balmy Beach Beachers (ORFU)
Date	Away	Home
November 17	**Toronto Argonauts 14**	Toronto Balmy Beach Beachers (ORFU) 2

- Toronto advances to the Grey Cup game.

== Playoff bracket ==
**Quarterfinals**
IRFU	Ottawa Rough Riders	8-10
IRFU	Toronto Argonauts	27-6
**EAST**
ORFU	Toronto Indians	1-0
ORFU	Toronto Balmy Beach	2-15
WIFU	Winnipeg Blue Bombers
WIFU	BYE
**WEST**
WIFU	Calgary Stampeders	3-11
WIFU	Regina Roughriders	1-0

**Semifinals**
IRFU	Toronto Argonauts	14
ORFU	Toronto Balmy Beach	2
WIFU	Winnipeg Blue Bombers	9
WIFU	Calgary Stampeders	6

**Grey Cup final**
IRFU	Toronto Argonauts	35
WIFU	Winnipeg Blue Bombers	0

== Grey Cup Championship ==
December 1 33rd Annual Grey Cup Game: Varsity Stadium – Toronto, Ontario
WIFU Champion	IRFU Champion
Winnipeg Blue Bombers 0	**Toronto Argonauts 35**
**The Toronto Argonauts are the 1945 Grey Cup Champions**

- Note: WIFU semifinal playoff dates are not confirmed, nor is Eastern Final date. However, since the regular season in the East ended October 27, and all other playoff dates, as well as Grey Cup date are accurate, it is reasonable to assume the above dates are accurate.

== 1945 Interprovincial Rugby Football Union All-Stars ==
NOTE: During this time most players played both ways, so the All-Star selections do not distinguish between some offensive and defensive positions.

- QB – Billy Myers, Toronto Argonauts
- HB – Royal Copeland, Toronto Argonauts
- HB – Joe Krol, Toronto Argonauts
- FB – Tony Golab, Ottawa Rough Riders
- E – Dick Groom, Hamilton Tigers
- E – Jack Wedley, Toronto Argonauts
- FW – Ken Charlton, Ottawa Rough Riders
- C – Curly Moynahan, Ottawa Rough Riders
- G – George Fraser, Ottawa Rough Riders
- G – Eddie Remigis, Hamilton Tigers
- T – Eric Chipper, Ottawa Rough Riders
- T – Les Ascot, Toronto Argonauts
- T – Steve Levantis, Toronto Argonauts

== 1945 Ontario Rugby Football Union All-Stars ==
NOTE: During this time most players played both ways, so the All-Star selections do not distinguish between some offensive and defensive positions.

- QB – Bill Stukus, Toronto Indians
- HB – Doug Pyzer, Toronto Indians
- HB – Ross McKelvey, Toronto Indians
- DB – Sam Sward, Toronto Balmy Beach Beachers
- E – Len Wright, Hamilton Wildcats
- E – Johnny Farmer, Toronto Indians
- FW – Fred Kijek, Toronto Indians
- C – Bob Cosgrove, Toronto Balmy Beach Beachers
- G – George Mountain, Hamilton Wildcats
- G – Len Staughton, Toronto Balmy Beach Beachers
- G – Harry "Suze" Turner, Toronto Balmy Beach Beachers
- T – George Sprague, Ottawa Trojans
- T – Don Durno, Toronto Indians

== 1945 Canadian Football Awards ==
- Jeff Russel Memorial Trophy (IRFU MVP) – George Fraser (OG), Ottawa Rough Riders
- Imperial Oil Trophy (ORFU MVP) - Arnie McWatters - Ottawa Trojans
