= Tony Golab =

Canadian football player (1919–2016)

No. 72
- Positions: Halfback, FW

Personal information
- Born: January 17, 1919; Windsor, Ontario, Canada
- Died: October 16, 2016 (aged 97); Ottawa, Ontario, Canada
- Listed height: 6 ft 2 in (1.88 m)
- Listed weight: 210 lb (95 kg)

Career history

Playing
- 1938: Sarnia Imperials
- 1939–1941: Ottawa Rough Riders
- 1942: Ottawa Uplands (RCAF)
- 1945–1950: Ottawa Rough Riders

Coaching
- 1952–1953: Royal Military College of Canada
- 1954–1957: Royal Military College of Canada

Operations
- 1959: Atlantic Football Conference
- 1968–1969: Montreal Alouettes

Awards and highlights
- Grey Cup champion (1940); Jeff Russel Memorial Trophy (1941); Lionel Conacher Award (1941); 5× CFL East All-Star (1938, 1940, 1945, 1947, 1948); Ottawa Rough Riders #72 retired
- Canadian Football Hall of Fame (Class of 1964)

Anthony Charles Golab, CM (January 17, 1919 – October 16, 2016) was a Canadian professional football halfback and flying wing who played in the Ontario Rugby Football Union and Interprovincial Rugby Football Union for 11 years with the Sarnia Imperials, Ottawa Rough Riders, and Ottawa Uplands. He was born in Windsor, Ontario.

Golab played with the Ottawa Rough Riders from 1939 to 1950. He was part of the 1939, 1941, and 1948 Grey Cup finalist teams and was part of the winning 1940 Grey Cup champions. He was an Eastern All-Star at halfback in 1938, 1940, and 1945 and at flying wing in 1947 and 1948.

In 1964, he was elected to the Canadian Football Hall of Fame. In 1975, he was inducted into Canada's Sports Hall of Fame. In 1985, he was made a Member of the Order of Canada. In 1997, he was inducted into the Ontario Sports Hall of Fame. He died at the Perley Veterans Health Centre in Ottawa, Ontario in October 2016 at the age of 97.
