= Dick Gregory (Canadian football) =

Canadian football player (born 1929)

Profile
- Positions: Halfback & Kicker

Personal information
- Born: April 15, 1929 (age 97); Billings, Montana, U.S.
- Listed height: 5 ft 10 in (1.78 m)
- Listed weight: 175 lb (79 kg)

Career information
- High school: Billings
- College: Minnesota
- NFL draft: 1952: 22nd round, 260th overall pick

Career history
- Saskatchewan Roughriders (1952); Toronto Balmy Beach Beachers (1953); Sarnia Imperials (1957)

Awards and highlights
- ORFU All-Star - 1953; ORFU Imperial Oil Trophy - 1953

Richard Allen Gregory (born April 15, 1929) is a Canadian football player.

A graduate of Billings High School and the University of Minnesota and selected 260th overall in the 22nd round by the Chicago Bears in the 1952 NFL draft, Gregory came to Canada to play professionally. He started with the Saskatchewan Roughriders in 1952, but it was the next year when he had a career season. Playing with the Toronto Balmy Beach Beachers he scored 98 points in 10 games (best in both the ORFU or CFL), helped win the league championship, was an all-star, and won the Imperial Oil Trophy as league MVP. After a try out with the Green Bay Packers, he returned to the ORFU in 1957, playing a season with the Sarnia Imperials.
