= Art Scullion =

Canadian football player (1930-2000)

Profile
- Position: End

Personal information
- Born: October 22, 1930; Toronto, Ontario, Canada
- Died: March 7, 2000 (aged 69)
- Listed height: 6 ft 3 in (1.91 m)
- Listed weight: 215 lb (98 kg)

Career history
- 1951–1954: Toronto Argonauts
- 1955: Hamilton Tiger-Cats
- 1957–1960: Calgary Stampeders

Awards and highlights
- Grey Cup champion (1952)

Arthur Gerald Joseph Scullion (October 22, 1930 – March 7, 2000) was a Canadian professional football player who played for the Toronto Argonauts, Hamilton Tiger-Cats, and Calgary Stampeders. He won the Grey Cup with them in 1952. He previously played for the Toronto Balmy Beach Beachers. He died in 2000 at the age of 69.
