= Ted Courtney =

Canadian football player

Profile
- Positions: Guard, Tackle

Career history
- 1945–1948: Toronto Argonauts

Awards and highlights
- Grey Cup champion (1945, 1946, 1947)

Ted Courtney was a Canadian professional football player who played for the Toronto Argonauts. He won the Grey Cup with them in 1945, 1946 and 1947.
