= Fred Kijek =

Profile
- Positions: Fullback, Punter, Flying Wing

Personal information
- Born: October 4, 1919; Hamilton, Ontario, Canada
- Died: March 21, 1986 (aged 66)

Career history
- 1940: Hamilton Tigers
- 1941: Toronto Argonauts
- 1942–1943: Toronto RCAF Hurricanes
- 1944: Camp Borden RCAF Fliers
- 1945–1946: Toronto Indians
- 1947–1949: Montreal Alouettes
- 1950–1951: Hamilton Tiger-Cats

Awards and highlights
- 2× Grey Cup champion (1942, 1949); 2× CFL All-Star (1942, 1945)

Bronislaus "Fred" Kijek (1919–1986) was a Grey Cup champion and All-Star fullback in the early days of Canadian football. He was also an excellent punter and flying wing.

The son of Joseph Kijek and Mary Buita, Kijek was a well traveled football player. During World War II he played with his hometown Hamilton Tigers, the Toronto Argonauts (playing five regular season and two playoff games), the Toronto RCAF Hurricanes (with whom he won his first Grey Cup), and the Camp Borden RCAF Fliers. He played for the Toronto Indians for a couple of seasons, then joined the inaugural Montreal Alouettes team in 1946. He won his second Grey Cup with them in 1949, his "terrific" punting being a key to victory. He returned home for his final two seasons with the Hamilton Tiger-Cats.

Kijek was twice an Ontario Rugby Football Union all star. He died on March 21, 1986.
