= George Fraser (Canadian football) =

Canadian football player (1911–1992)

Profile
- Positions: Guard, Kicker

Personal information
- Born: 1911; Perthshire, Scotland
- Died: December 9, 1992 (aged 80–81)

Career information
- College: none

Career history

Playing
- 1932–1942: Ottawa Rough Riders
- 1943: Ottawa Combines
- 1944: Ottawa Trojans
- 1945: Ottawa Rough Riders

Coaching
- 1942, 1946: Ottawa Rough Riders

Awards and highlights
- Grey Cup champion (1940); Jeff Russel Memorial Trophy (1945); 4× CFL All-Star (1938–1941)

Gerorge Fraser (1911 – December 9, 1992) was a Canadian football player, playing from 1932 to 1945.

Born in Perthshire, Scotland and coming to Canada in 1921, Fraser played all of his career with Ottawa-based teams. Starting with the Ottawa Rough Riders in 1932, he played guard and became a league leading kicker, was named an all-Canadian all-star in 1938, 1939 and 1940, and won the Grey Cup in 1940. He also played in the Grey Cup games of 1936, 1939 and 1941. In 1941 he scored 11 of Ottawa's 16 points. In 1942 he was playing coach with the Riders. During the war years he played in the Ontario Rugby Football Union, with the Ottawa Combines in 1943 and the Ottawa Trojans in 1944. He finished his player career on a high note in 1945 with the Rough Riders, winning the Jeff Russel Memorial Trophy as the best player in the Interprovincial Rugby Football Union.

Fraser also coached the Riders in 1942 and 1946, compiling an 8 win, 5 loss and 2 tie record, and losing the only playoff game he coached. He was assistant coach in 1947. From 1957 through 1962 he was an on field official in the CFL, the only person ever to have played, coached and officiated in the league.
