= Cece Foderingham =

Canadian football player

Profile
- Positions: Guard, Tackle

Personal information
- Born: August 12, 1919; Toronto, Ontario, Canada
- Died: January 29, 1983 (aged 63); Toronto, Ontario, Canada

Career history
- 1941–1942: Toronto RCAF Hurricanes
- 1947–1948: Toronto Argonauts

Awards and highlights
- 2× Grey Cup champion (1942, 1947)

William Cecil "Cece" Foderingham (August 12, 1919 – January 29, 1983) was a Canadian professional football player who played for the Toronto RCAF Hurricanes and the Toronto Argonauts. He won the Grey Cup with both teams, first in 1942 and again in 1947.
