= Jimmy Lander =

American football player (1912–1989)

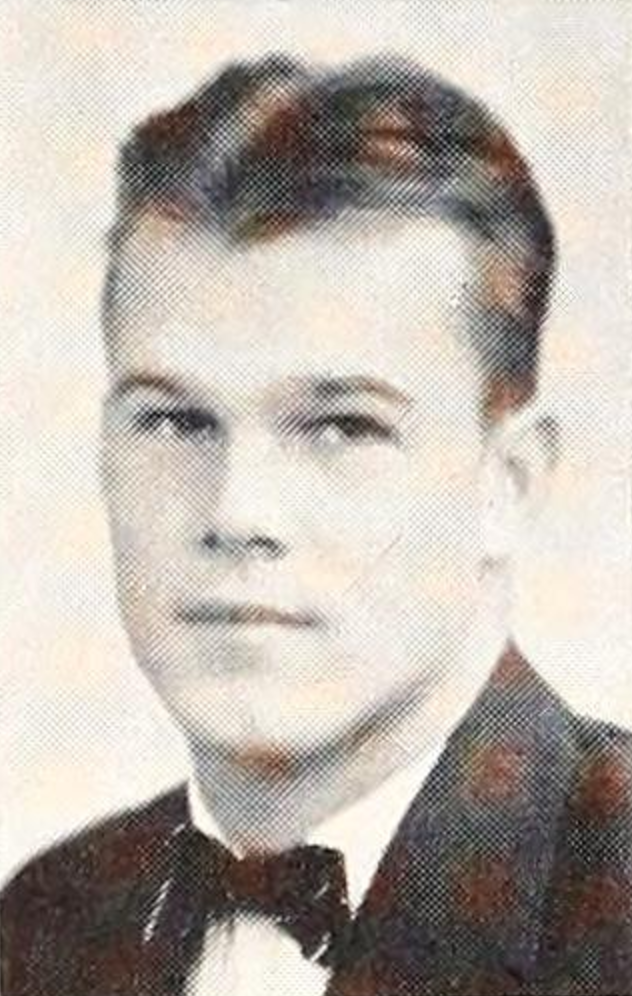
- Lander pictured in Royal purple 1936, Kansas State yearbook

Profile
- Positions: Quarterback, Halfback

Personal information
- Born: October 14, 1912; Kansas, U.S.
- Died: June 21, 1989 (aged 76); San Diego County, California, U.S.
- Listed weight: 185 lb (84 kg)

Career information
- College: Kansas State

Career history
- 1941: Winnipeg Blue Bombers

Awards and highlights
- Grey Cup champion (1941)

James Ellis Lander (October 14, 1912 – June 21, 1989) was an American gridiron football player who played Canadian football for the Winnipeg Blue Bombers. He won the Grey Cup with them in 1941.
