= Billy Myers (Canadian football) =

Canadian football player (1923–2019)

Profile
- Position: Halfback

Personal information
- Born: September 7, 1923; Saint John, New Brunswick, Canada
- Died: April 13, 2019 (aged 95); Richmond Hill, Ontario, Canada
- Listed height: 5 ft 7 in (1.70 m)
- Listed weight: 132 lb (60 kg)

Career history
- 1945–1948: Toronto Argonauts

Awards and highlights
- Grey Cup champion (1945, 1946)

Billy "Bubbles" Myers (September 7, 1923 – April 13, 2019) was a Canadian professional football player who played for the Toronto Argonauts. He won the Grey Cup with them in 1945 and 1946. He previously played football with the Vaughan Road Academy, University of Toronto and the Toronto Balmy Beach Beachers. After his football career, he coached football from 1955 to 1985 at Earl Haig Collegiate. Myers died in Richmond Hill, Ontario in 2019 at the age of 95.
