= Windsor Royals (football) =

General information
- Founded: 1945; 81 years ago
- Folded: 1952; 74 years ago
- Stadium: Windsor Stadium
- Headquartered: Windsor, Ontario, Canada
- Colours: Red, White, and Blue

Personnel
- Head coach: Jack Alexander (1952)

League / conference affiliations
- Ontario Rugby Football Union

The Windsor Royals were a football team from Windsor, Ontario and a member of the Ontario Rugby Football Union, a league that preceded the Canadian Football League and contested for the Grey Cup until the team folded after the 1952 season.

== History ==
The Windsor football club first began as the Windsor Rockets in 1945 as a member of the Ontario Rugby Football Union where they primarily played their home games out of Jackson Park. They finished the 1945 season winless, and their fortunes would not improve by much over the course of their eight-year history. The club never finished above .500, never finished higher than 3rd place, and never qualified for the post-season. The team was known as the Rockets until 1950, when they were renamed the Windsor Royals.

On October 21, 1952, it was announced that the Windsor Royals had withdrawn from the ORFU, meaning that their three remaining games would be cancelled. The Royals had lost all nine games that season and had not won a game since 1950. As a result, attendance at games was dwindling, causing problems with funding and being able to pay players. While there were plans to come back in 1953, those plans never came to fruition, and the Windsor football club folded after the 1952 season.

== Seasons ==
Season	W	L	T	PF	PA	Pts	Finish	Playoffs
1945	0	7	0	20	126	0	5th, ORFU	Missed playoffs
1946	3	7	0	61	138	6	5th, ORFU	Missed playoffs
1947	4	6	0	86	138	8	5th, ORFU	Missed playoffs
1948	0	8	1	40	245	1	4th, ORFU	Missed playoffs
1949	5	7	0	142	108	10	3rd, ORFU	Missed playoffs
1950	2	6	0	52	176	4	3rd, ORFU	Missed playoffs
1951	0	10	0	27	286	0	4th, ORFU	Missed playoffs
1952	0	9	0	60	274	0	4th, ORFU	Folded after nine games

- The Windsor Royals were scheduled to play 12 games in 1952, but the last three were canceled after the club withdrew from play. The Royals stopped competing in the ORFU after this season.
