= Arnie McWatters =

Canadian football player

Profile
- Positions: Quarterback, halfback

Personal information
- Born: Sarnia, Ontario, Canada

Career information
- College: Sarnia Collegiate Institute and Technical School

Career history
- 1935–38: Sarnia Imperials
- 1939–42: Ottawa Rough Riders
- 1943: Ottawa Combines
- 1944–47: Ottawa Trojans

Awards and highlights
- 2× Grey Cup champion (1936, 1940); Imperial Oil Trophy (1945); 2× CFL All-Star (1936, 1942)

Arnie McWatters was a Canadian quarterback and halfback in the Ontario Rugby Football Union.

Coming straight from high school, McWatters played for his hometown Sarnia Imperials from 1935 to 1938, with his finest season being 1936, when he won the Grey Cup and was an all-star. He next played four seasons with the Ottawa Rough Riders where he won another Grey Cup in 1940 and was an all-star in 1942. After one season with the Ottawa Combines, he finished his career playing four seasons for the Ottawa Trojans, the highlight coming in 1945 when he won the Imperial Oil Trophy as OFRU most valuable player.

He later coached the University of Ottawa and Carleton University football teams. In 1991 he was elected to the Sarnia Lambton Sports Hall of Fame.
