= Lou Mogul =

Canadian gridiron football player

Profile
- Positions: Guard, T

Personal information
- Born: c. 1909; Winnipeg, Manitoba, Canada
- Died: January 4, 1966 (aged 56); Regina, Saskatchewan, Canada
- Listed height: 6 ft 3 in (1.91 m)
- Listed weight: 225 lb (102 kg)

Career information
- College: North Dakota State

Career history
- 1932–1943: Winnipeg Blue Bombers
- 1946: Montreal Alouettes
- 1949: Edmonton Eskimos

Awards and highlights
- 3× Grey Cup champion (1935, 1939, 1941)

Lou Mogul (c. 1909 – January 4, 1966) was a Canadian professional football player who played for the Winnipeg Blue Bombers, Montreal Alouettes, and Edmonton Eskimos. He won the Grey Cup with Winnipeg in 1935, 1939 and 1941. He played college football at North Dakota State University.
