= Mel Wilson =

Canadian football player (1917–2007)

Profile
- Positions: Centre, Defensive tackle

Personal information
- Born: April 3, 1917; Winnipeg, Manitoba, Canada
- Died: July 29, 2007 (aged 90); Winnipeg, Manitoba, Canada
- Listed height: 6 ft 2 in (1.88 m)
- Listed weight: 230 lb (104 kg)

Career information
- High school: Kelvin High School
- College: none

Career history
- 1937–41: Winnipeg Blue Bombers
- 1942: Winnipeg RCAF Bombers
- 1943: Winnipeg United Services Combines
- 1945–47: Winnipeg Blue Bombers
- 1948: Montreal Alouettes
- 1949–51: Calgary Stampeders

Awards and highlights
- 2× Grey Cup champion (1939, 1941); 4× CFL All-Star (1941, 1946, 1947, 1949)

Melford Russel Wilson (April 3, 1917 – July 29, 2007) was an all-star and record-setting Grey Cup champion Canadian football player, playing from 1937 to 1951.

A Winnipeg native, Wilson played his first football with St. John's College, later playing two seasons at Kelvin High School. In 1936 he captained the St. John's Roamers, who defeated the Moose Jaw Millers 13-5 to win the Western Canada Junior football championship.

In 1937 he joined his hometown Winnipeg Blue Bombers for a 5-year stretch, playing in 4 Grey Cup games, and winning two in 1939 and 1941 (in which scored a touchdown). In 1942 he joined the citywide all-star team, the Winnipeg RCAF Bombers, for the playoffs, losing another Grey Cup. He played 1943 with the Winnipeg United Services Combines and did not play in 1944.

In 1945 he rejoined the Bombers for 3 seasons, playing in 3 more Grey Cup losses. He signed with the Montreal Alouettes for 12 games in 1948. He finished his career with 3 more seasons with the Calgary Stampeders and was part of their 1949 Grey Cup losing team.

In all, Wilson played in nine Grey Cup championships, the most by any player until his record was later tied by six other players. He was also an all-star in 1941, 1946 and 1947 with the Bombers and in 1949 with the Stampeders.

After he retired he was a successful amateur athlete, winning trophies in golf, curling, racquetball and competitive ballroom dancing. He worked with the Manitoba Labour Board, Winnipeg Hydro, retiring, age 80, as a commissionaire at the provincial legislature.

He was inducted into the Winnipeg Football Club Hall of Fame in 1985 and the Manitoba Sports Hall of Fame in 2004.

He died, age 90, in Winnipeg on July 29, 2007.
