= 18th Grey Cup =

1930 Canadian Football championship game

| Regina Roughriders | Toronto Balmy Beach Beachers |
|---|---|
| (4–0) | (4–0) |
| 6 | 11 |
| Head coach: Al Ritchie | Head coach: Alex Ponton |
| | 1 | 2 | 3 | 4 | Total |
|---|---|---|---|---|---|
| Regina Roughriders | 0 | 0 | 6 | 0 | 6 |
| Toronto Balmy Beach Beachers | 3 | 7 | 0 | 1 | 11 |
- Date: December 6, 1930
- Stadium: Varsity Stadium
- Location: Toronto
- Attendance: 3,914

The 18th Grey Cup was played on December 6, 1930, before 3,914 fans at the Varsity Stadium at Toronto.

The Toronto Balmy Beach Beachers defeated the Regina Roughriders 11–6. Regina scored the first touchdown for a western club in a Grey Cup game.
