= Toronto RCAF Hurricanes =

Canadian air force rugby team in World War II

General information
- Founded: 1942; 84 years ago
- Folded: 1943; 83 years ago
- Headquartered: Toronto, Ontario, Canada

League / conference affiliations
- Ontario Rugby Football Union

Championships
- League championships: 0; 30th Grey Cup

The Toronto RCAF Hurricanes was a member of the Ontario Rugby Football Union and was formed during the Second World War after both the Western Interprovincial Football Union and Interprovincial Rugby Football Union suspended operations and teams disbanded for the war. The team was composed of football players who had joined the Royal Canadian Air Force, and would go on to win the 30th Grey Cup in 1942.

After the win, fifteen members of the team went on to operational service with the RCAF in Europe during the war. Seven of those men were killed in combat: Eddie Thompson, Lloyd Langley, Ed Poscavage, Eddie Burton, Jack Buckmaster, George Oliphant and Bob Sarvis.

== 1942 Grey Cup ==
As Canadians were deeply affected by the mounting losses overseas, the Toronto RCAF Hurricanes were formed and invited to compete for the Grey Cup in an effort to boost the country's morale. As their victories accumulated, their matches began drawing audiences that had not been witnessed in a decade.

On December 5, 1942, the Toronto RCAF Hurricanes defeated the Winnipeg RCAF Bombers in an 8-5 win. Due to the timing of the game, the playing field conditions were poor, with mud, turf, and patches of ice. It was suggested to the Canadian Rugby Union that the Dominion Championship be held in November in future to avoid poor field conditions. Over 12,000 fans attended the game at Varsity Stadium.

== 1942 Grey Cup Line Up ==
- QB – Bill Stukus
- FW – Fred Kijek
- HB – Eddie Thompson
- HB – Jack Alexander
- HB – Jack Perry
- E – Ed Poscavage
- E – Eddie Burton
- C – Jake Gaudaur
- G – Paul McGarry
- G – Lloyd Langley
- T – Art Evans
- T – Don Durno

Alternates: Don Crowe, John Buckmaster, Jack Taylor, Cece Foderingham, George Oliphant, Art West, Bob Sarvis, John Poplowsky, Charlie Prince, Victor S.(Red) Reynolds, Joey Richman, Jimmy Partridge

Coach: Lew Hayman

== ORFU season-by-season ==
Season	W	L	T	PF	PA	Pts	Finish	Playoffs
1942	8	1	1	180	61	17	First	Won 30th Grey Cup
1943	7	2	1	133	67	15	Third	-

== Notable players ==
- Bill Stukus
- Eddie Thompson
- Fred Kijek
- Bob Cosgrove
- Jake Gaudaur

== The Photograph ==
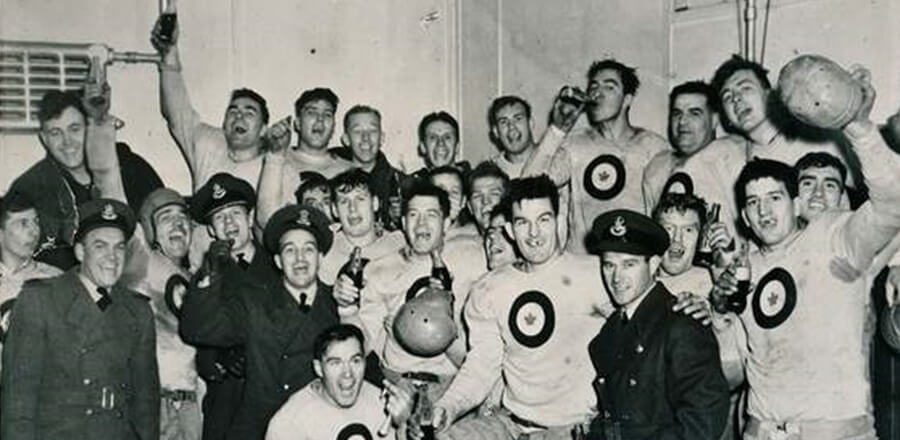
Photograph of the RCAF Hurricanes celebrating their 1942 Grey Cup Win

In 2012, in partnership with Infly Field Productions, The Sports Network debuted their documentary The Photograph: Engraved on a Nation.

The documentary, directed by Manfred Becker, celebrates the 100th anniversary of the Grey Cup and focuses on Jake Gaudaur. Gaudaur's daughters, Jackie and Diane, tell the story behind the photograph of the RCAF Hurricanes celebrating their Grey Cup win in 1942.

The documentary aired on Friday, November 9, 2012.
