= Bob Cosgrove =

American rugby player

Profile
- Positions: Center, Guard, Tackle

Career information
- College: University of Montana

Career history
- 1938–40: Calgary Bronks
- 1941: Toronto Argonauts
- 1942: Toronto Balmy Beach Beachers
- 1943: Toronto RCAF Hurricanes
- 1945–46: Toronto Balmy Beach Beachers
- 1947: Toronto Indians
- 1948: Toronto Balmy Beach Beachers
- 1949: Toronto Argonauts

Awards and highlights
- 4× CFL All-Star (1941, 1942, 1943, 1945); Imperial Oil Trophy (1943)

Bob Cosgrove (June 2, 1915 – October 13, 1981) was an offensive lineman in the Ontario Rugby Football Union.

A graduate of the University of Montana Cosgrove began his football career in the WIFU with the Calgary Bronks. He turned professional in the east with Toronto Argonauts in 1941, but moved to the ORFU the next season with the Toronto Balmy Beach Beachers where he was an all-star.

Perhaps his best season was 1943 with the wartime Toronto RCAF Hurricanes, when he was again an all-star and winner of the Imperial Oil Trophy as the ORFU most valuable player.

Cosgrove later played for several Toronto teams: the Beachers, the Toronto Indians, the Beachers again when they merged with the Indians, and finally another year with the Argos (he played 13 regular season and 2 playoff games with the Boatmen in his two years).
