= Rube Ludwig =

Canadian professional football player

No. 37
- Positions: Guard, Tackle

Personal information
- Born: c. 1920; Winnipeg, Manitoba, Canada
- Died: July 5, 1991 (aged 71); Montreal, Quebec, Canada
- Listed height: 6 ft 1 in (1.85 m)
- Listed weight: 235 lb (107 kg)

Career history
- 1941, 1945: Winnipeg Blue Bombers
- 1946–1948: Calgary Stampeders

Awards and highlights
- Grey Cup champion (1941,1948)

Rubin Ludwig (c. 1920 – July 5, 1991) was a Canadian professional football player who played for the Calgary Stampeders and Winnipeg Blue Bombers. He played in 4 Grey Cups with Winnipeg in 1941 and 1945, winning in 1941. Also played with Calgary in 1947 and 1948. He again won the Grey Cup with the Stampeders in 1948. He previously played junior football in Winnipeg, Manitoba. He died after a long illness in 1991.
