= Winnipeg RCAF Bombers =

General information
- Founded: 1942
- Folded: 1943
- Headquartered: Winnipeg, Manitoba

League / conference affiliations
- Winnipeg City League; Western Canada Armed Services Rugby Football Union

Championships
- League championships: 0; 2 league championships

The Winnipeg RCAF Bombers were a Canadian football team during World War II. They lost the 30th Grey Cup and 31st Grey Cup games.

In 1942, the Winnipeg Blue Bombers didn't have any competition for the regular season so they created their own competition. With an abundance of players available, the Blue Bombers split the players into two teams. The civilian men played for a team known simply as the Bombers and the servicemen played for the RCAF Flyers. A third team in the Winnipeg City League was the University of Manitoba Bisons who were a junior team.

Upon completion of the 1942 Winnipeg City League season, the teams were dissolved and a new combined team was formed for playoff competition. On November 4, 1942, the Winnipeg RCAF Bombers were created and 34 players were selected to the team. Of the 34 players, 16 players came from the Bombers, 15 players represented the RCAF Flyers and the remaining 3 players were Manitoba Bisons. As the RCAF & Bombers teams made up the majority of the team, it was decided to call the combined team the Winnipeg RCAF Bombers.

In addition to creating a stronger team, the combined team served another purpose. The war efforts were the number one concern at the time and there was no guarantee that the servicemen would be available for the Grey Cup game. By forming a combined team, the Blue Bombers ensured that they would have a competitive team if some or all of the players got called into active military duty.

The 1942 Winnipeg RCAF Bombers played their first game on November 7, 1942 against the Regina Navy football team. The RCAF Bombers won the game 13-6 and advanced to the Grey Cup. On December 5, 1942, the Toronto RCAF Hurricanes defeated the Winnipeg RCAF Bombers 8-5.

The Winnipeg Blue Bombers kept the RCAF Bombers moniker for the 1943 season and they played in the Armed Services Rugby League with two other teams (Winnipeg United Services Combines & Regina All-Services Roughriders). The Winnipeg RCAF Bombers easily won the regular season as they went a perfect 6-0. They defeated the All-Services Roughriders in the two-game total-points series 12-0 and they advanced to the Grey Cup. On November 27, 1943, the Hamilton Flying Wildcats defeated the Winnipeg RCAF Bombers 23-14.

The team suspended operations for the 1944 season and when reorganized in 1945, they reverted to being the Winnipeg Blue Bombers.
