= 15th Grey Cup =

1927 Canadian Football championship game

Hamilton Tigers	Toronto Balmy Beach Beachers
(5–1)	(5–1)
6	9
Head coach: Mike Rodden	Head coach: Dr. Harry Hobbs
	1	2	3	4	Total
Hamilton Tigers	0	0	6	0	6
Toronto Balmy Beach Beachers	7	2	0	0	9
- Date: November 26, 1927
- Stadium: Varsity Stadium
- Location: Toronto
- Attendance: 13,676

The 15th Grey Cup was played on November 26, 1927, before 13,676 fans at the Varsity Stadium at Toronto.

The Toronto Balmy Beach Beachers defeated the Hamilton Tigers 9–6.
