= Aldon Lewis Lenard =

Canadian athlete (1921–2007)

Aldon Lewis Lenard (January 6, 1921 in northern Italy – February 23, 2007 in Kingston, Ontario, Canada) was an athlete, university professor, athletics administrator, coach, and referee.

Lenard was born in Italy and moved to Canada with his family at age three. They settled in Windsor, Ontario, where Lenard completed high school and played a range of sports, including football, basketball, and track and field. He played semi-professional football with the Hamilton Flying Wildcats and the Hamilton Tigers (today merged into the Hamilton Tiger-Cats of the Canadian Football League) in the Ontario Rugby Football Union for two seasons, and was a quarterback, kicker, and defender. He was a national All-Star for two seasons.

He joined the Royal Canadian Navy in 1941, served for four years during World War II, and won a number of field events at service meets, such as the discus and the javelin.

At the war's end, Lenard enrolled in the Physical and Health Education (today the Kinesiology and Health Studies) program at Queen's University. He played football and starred at quarterback, and won the Jenkins Trophy as the outstanding student-athlete in his graduating year, 1950. He was a conference All-Star for two seasons. He was a member of the first-ever class to graduate from Queen's with undergrad degrees in physical and health education. He also played varsity basketball, golf, track and field, swimming, and softball for Queen's.

Lenard then enrolled in a Master's program at the University of Michigan. He did his doctorate at the University of Illinois, and returned to Queen's in 1954 to join the faculty, teaching both undergraduate and graduate courses. He was eventually appointed as full professor.

He became an assistant football coach at Queen's in 1954, and stayed with that until 1970, contributing to Queen's first Vanier Cup title in 1968 under head coach Frank Tindall; Queen's also won eight Yates Cup titles during that stretch, out of 17 seasons. There was no true Canadian national university football championship prior to 1965, but the Old Four league, which comprised Queen's, the University of Toronto, McGill University, and the University of Western Ontario, was generally respected as the top university football league in the country.

Lenard also coached the golf team with success for many years into the 1980s, winning several conference titles.

He was appointed in 1963 as Athletic Director for Queen's, and served in that post for 20 years, until 1983. During that time, from 1972, the Ontario University Athletics Association (OUAA, today Ontario University Athletics (OUA)) group unified its operations to include all provincial institutions which wanted to compete, under one league structure; before that, there had been several separate leagues. Lenard led the move to overcome resistance to change. Today, the OUA, with 19 member institutions, is the largest university sports conference in the world.

Under Lenard's leadership, Queen's expanded from 19 to 42 varsity teams, the most in the country, and fielded teams in every available varsity sport. Queen's also opened a new and greatly expanded athletics complex in 1971, to meet rising enrollment from baby-boomers who were reaching university age.

Lenard was elected President of the National Athletic Director's Association in 1972, and Vice-President of the Canadian Interuniversity Athletic Union (CIAU, today Canadian Interuniversity Sport (CIS)) in 1973. He served as Chairman of the CIAU Administrative Council from 1973 to 1974, Chairman of the OUAA Administrative Council from 1974 to 1976, and President of the OUAA from 1980 to 1988.

He was also a basketball referee for 12 seasons, and managed the Kingston City Basketball League.

Lenard was a recipient of the J.P. Loosemore Award from the OUAA for outstanding service to university athletics. He was inducted into the Queen's University Golden Gaels Football Hall of Fame, the Queen's University Golden Gaels Coaches' Hall of Fame, and the Kingston and District Sports Hall of Fame.

Lenard wrote the book How to Play Canadian Football.

He had won the inaugural Kingston City Golf Championship in 1957, and many more golf club championships and local events. Lenard continued to compete very avidly and successfully at golf, bowling, and curling, until suffering a stroke in 2001 at age 80, from which he lost the use of his right side. His final years were quiet, but he lived to see the planning for the Queen's Centre, the next generation Athletics and Student Life Centre for the campus. This new project was the most complex and most expensive (slated for $230 million) ever undertaken at any Canadian university, and had its groundbreaking ceremony on March 2, 2007.

Lenard died at age 86 in Kingston on February 23, 2007. His wife Jean, whom he had married in 1946, died ten days later, on March 7, 2007.
