= 25th Grey Cup =

1937 Canadian Football championship game

Winnipeg Blue Bombers	Toronto Argonauts
(4–4)	(5–1)
3	4
Head coach: Bob Fritz	Head coach: Lew Hayman
	1	2	3	4	Total
Winnipeg Blue Bombers	1	1	0	1	3
Toronto Argonauts	3	1	0	0	4
- Date: December 11, 1937
- Stadium: Varsity Stadium
- Location: Toronto
- Attendance: 11,522

The 25th Grey Cup was played on December 11, 1937, before 11,522 fans at Varsity Stadium at Toronto.

The Toronto Argonauts defeated the Winnipeg Blue Bombers 4–3.

Until 2021, this was the latest in the calendar year that any Grey Cup was played. The record was broken by one day at the 108th Grey Cup, which was played on December 12 due to the 2021 CFL season being delayed by the COVID-19 pandemic in Canada.
