= Ken Charlton (Canadian football) =

Canadian football player (born 1920)

Profile
- Position: Running back

Personal information
- Born: April 20, 1920; Regina, Saskatchewan, Canada
- Died: May 1, 2004 (aged 84); Burnaby, British Columbia, Canada

Career history
- 1941: Regina Roughriders
- 1942: Winnipeg RCAF Bombers
- 1943: Regina All Services All-Stars
- 1945–1947: Ottawa Rough Riders
- 1948–1954: Saskatchewan Roughriders

Awards and highlights
- 8× CFL All-Star (1941, 43, 45, 46, 48–51)
- Canadian Football Hall of Fame (Class of 1992)

Kenneth Charlton (April 20, 1920 – May 1, 2004) was a Canadian professional football running back for the Saskatchewan Roughriders. He was elected to the Canadian Football Hall of Fame in 1992. He was also named to the Roughriders Plaza of Honour and to the Saskatchewan Sports Hall of Fame.

== Early life ==
Ken Charlton grew up in Regina and played high school football at Central Collegiate. He played his junior football with the Regina West End Juniors (1938) and Regina Park Dale (1939-40).

== Professional career ==
He signed with the Regina Roughriders in 1941 and was named to the CFL All-Star team his rookie year. Charlton joined the Royal Canadian Air Force and was stationed in Winnipeg, so he became a member of the Winnipeg RCAF Bombers on their way for the Grey Cup. Charlton returned to football after a hiatus during the war, joining the Roughriders in 1943 and making the CFL All-Star team once more.

He joined the Ottawa Rough Riders the following year as a halfback and punter, and was a member of the CFL All-Star team in 1945 and 1946. Charlton returned to Saskatchewan and finished his career with the Saskatchewan Roughriders from 1948 to 1954. Charlton rushed for 498 yards on 76 attempts in 1950, and his 19.1 yard average per pass reception was the best in the West. In 1953, he averaged 42.2 yards per punt and was the West's leading punt returner with a 12.1 yard average. He was captain of the Roughriders for four years and appeared in his second Grey Cup in 1951. He was a member of the CFL All-Star team with the Roughriders in 1948, 1949, 1950, and 1951. He was a member of the CFL team that toured Korea in 1954, and retired later that year.

Charlton was inducted into the Canadian Football Hall of Fame in 1992 and the Saskatchewan Roughrider Plaza of Honour in 1988 for his outstanding football career. He was inducted in the Saskatchewan Sports Hall of Fame on June 14, 1986, and in 2004 he became an Honorary Inductee of the Regina Sports Hall of Fame.

== Awards ==
- All-Western Flying Wing: 1941
- All-Eastern Flying Wing: 1945, 1946
- All-Western Running Back: 1948, 1949
- Grey Cup Participation: 1942, 1951
