= 26th Grey Cup =

1938 Canadian Football championship game

Winnipeg Blue Bombers	Toronto Argonauts
(6–2)	(5–1)
7	30
Head coach: Red Threlfall	Head coach: Lew Hayman
	1	2	3	4	Total
Winnipeg Blue Bombers	4	3	0	0	7
Toronto Argonauts	0	5	1	24	30
- Date: December 10, 1938
- Stadium: Varsity Stadium
- Location: Toronto
- Attendance: 18,778

The 26th Grey Cup was played on December 10, 1938, before 18,778 fans at Varsity Stadium at Toronto.

The Toronto Argonauts defeated the Winnipeg Blue Bombers 30–7.
