= Ontario Rugby Football Union =

Early amateur Canadian football league

The Ontario Rugby Football Union (ORFU) was an early amateur Canadian football league comprising teams in the Canadian province of Ontario. The ORFU was founded on Saturday, January 6, 1883, and in 1903 it became the first major competition to adopt the Burnside rules, from which the modern Canadian football code would evolve. The ORFU converted from a senior level to an intermediate level league after 1960, and had ceased to exist by 1974. The ORFU operated a league competition for junior teams, from 1890 to 1970.

== History ==
W. A. Hewitt was vice-president of the ORFU for the 1905 and 1906 seasons, and a representative of the Toronto Argonauts. He sought for ORFU to have uniform rules of play with the Canadian Rugby Union (CRU), with a preference to use the snap-back system of play used in Ontario. When the CRU did not adopt the system, his motion was approved for the ORFU to adopt the CRU rules in 1906. In December 1906, The Gazette reported that a proposal originated from Ottawa for the ORFU and the Quebec Rugby Football Union to merge, which would allow for higher calibre of play and create rivalries. Hewitt helped organize the meeting which established the Interprovincial Rugby Football Union (IRFU) in 1907.

For most of the first half of the 20th century, the ORFU was one of the stronger unions in Canada, and its champion was a frequent fixture in the Grey Cup even as the game became increasingly professionalized in the 1930s.

During World War II, the Ontario-based military teams played in the ORFU, filling the gap during the suspension of play by the IRFU (Toronto Navy – H.M.C.S. York played out of Varsity Stadium, using the Toronto Argonauts' equipment and uniforms.) The Toronto RCAF Hurricanes were the last amateur team to win the Grey Cup in 1942. Many from the ranks of the military teams in the ORFU became stars in the CFL after the war.

=== Decline ===
With the return of peace, the ORFU found it increasingly difficult to compete in a sport dominated by the IRFU and the Western Interprovincial Football Union, which had both become fully professional. Indeed, by then it was the only fully amateur union still challenging for the Grey Cup. Even so, it retained enough prestige that it played the WIFU champion for a berth in the Grey Cup final. The IRFU was reluctant to accept the WIFU as a full equal, even after the Calgary Stampeders won the national title in 1948. While the IRFU would go on to win the next five Grey Cups after that, it generally triumphed in close contests against WIFU opposition who had consistently outclassed ORFU champions in successive Grey Cup semifinals.

Following the unexpected triumph of the Edmonton Eskimos in the 1954 Grey Cup, it was increasingly apparent that the WIFU's quality of play had become the equal of the IRFU, and the Western union soon made it publicly known that a playoff with the ORFU was no longer desirable. Meanwhile, the IRFU had secured a contract with the National Broadcasting Company. Informed by NBC executives that the continued presence of amateur teams in Grey Cup competition was harmful to the image of Canadian football in the United States, the IRFU quickly reversed its stance and entered into informal discussions with the WIFU. Although the Canadian Rugby Union constitution nominally prevented the professional unions from outright barring amateurs from challenging for the Grey Cup, they nevertheless came to a gentlemen's agreement to coordinate their schedules so that their respective championships would be awarded about a week before the Grey Cup, thus leaving no feasible date to contest an inter-union Grey Cup semifinal.

When the ORFU protested, the professional unions threatened to resign from the CRU and create their own national championship. Realizing this would leave them merely competing for a trophy of far diminished stature, the ORFU subsequently withdrew from Grey Cup competition in exchange for a promise that they would be permitted to challenge for the trophy again if their calibre of play improved. In reality there was virtually no chance of this occurring since the only practical means of improving their quality of play would have been for the ORFU to become a professional union, an arrangement its clubs lacked the financial resources to sustain.

The professional unions would go on to create the Canadian Football Council and effectively assumed control of organizing Grey Cup competition from the CRU. Although amateurs would not be formally locked out of Grey Cup play until 1958, when the CFC became the modern Canadian Football League and formally took ownership of the Grey Cup, these earlier developments effectively heralded the start of the modern era of Canadian football.

The ORFU ceased to operate as a true senior league after 1960 championship between the London Lords and the Port Huron Raiders, but it continued play at the intermediate level. Eventually the word "senior" came to replace the word "intermediate." By 1974, the ORFU had ceased to exist. However, the junior Ontario Rugby Football Union which was formed in 1890 lasted until the 1970 season.

== Notable teams ==
- Toronto Football Club (1883–1895)
- Toronto Argonauts (1898–1906)
- Toronto Athletic Club (1896), Toronto Athletic Club-Lornes (1897)
- Hamilton Tigers 1883–1906, 1948–1949
- Ottawa Football Club (1883–1897), Ottawa Rough Riders (1898–1906)
- Ottawa College Football Club (1885–1889, 1892–1898)
- Kingston Granites (1899–1901)
- Toronto Parkdale Canoe Club (1909–1910, 1912–1913, 1920–1923) 4 time ORFU champions, lost Grey Cup in 1909, 1913
- Hamilton Alerts – 1st Grey Cup Champions of the ORFU in 1912 (1911–1912, another team played by the name in 1940)
- Toronto Balmy Beach – 2 time Grey Cup Champions: 1927, 1930 (1924–1957)
- Sarnia Imperials – 2 time Grey Cup Champions: 1934, 1936 (1928–1955)
- Toronto Amateur Athletic Club – ORFU Champion 1908 and 1910
- Toronto Rugby and Athletic Association – ORFU Champion 1915, 1919 and 1920
- Hamilton (Flying) Wildcats – Grey Cup Champions: 1943 (1941–1947)
- Toronto Indians (1941–1948)
- Toronto RCAF Hurricanes – Grey Cup Champions: 1942 (1942–1943)
- Ottawa Trojans (1943–1947) ORFU Champion 1947
- Windsor Rockets (1945–1950), Windsor Royals (1951–52)
- Brantford Redskins (1952–1953)
- Kitchener-Waterloo Dutchmen (1953–1959) ORFU Champion 1954–1957
- London Lords (1956–1970)
- Rochester (NY) Rockets (1956)
- Detroit Raiders (1959)
- Port Huron Raiders (1960)
- Sarnia Golden Bears ORFU Champion (1958–59)
- Bramalea Satellites (1967–1970)

== Champions ==
Year	Champion
1883	Toronto Football Club
1884	Toronto Football Club
1885	Ottawa College Football Club
1886	Ottawa College Football Club
1887	Ottawa College Football Club
1888	Ottawa College Football Club
1889	Ottawa College Football Club
1890	Hamilton Tigers
1891	Osgoode Hall
1892	Osgoode Hall
1893	Queen's University
1894	Queen's University
1895	University of Toronto Varsity Football Club
1896	University of Toronto Varsity Football Club
1897	Hamilton Tigers
1898	Ottawa Rough Riders
1899	Kingston Granites
1900	Ottawa Rough Riders
1901	Toronto Argonauts
1902	Ottawa Rough Riders
1903	Hamilton Tigers
1904	Hamilton Tigers
1905	Hamilton Tigers
1906	Hamilton Tigers
1907	Peterborough Quakers
1908	Toronto Amateur Athletic Club
1909	Toronto Parkdale Canoe Club
1910	Toronto Amateur Athletic Club
1911	Hamilton Alerts
1912	Hamilton Alerts (Grey Cup champions)
1913	Toronto Parkdale Canoe Club
1914	Hamilton Rowing Club
1915	Toronto Rugby and Athletic Association
1916	No season: World War I
1917	No season: World War I
1918	No season: World War I
1919	Torontos
1920	Torontos
1921	Toronto Parkdale Canoe Club
1922	Toronto Parkdale Canoe Club
1923	Hamilton Rowing Club
1924	Toronto Balmy Beach
1925	Toronto Balmy Beach
1926	Toronto Balmy Beach
1927	Toronto Balmy Beach (Grey Cup champions)
1928	University of Toronto Seconds
1929	Sarnia Imperials
1930	Toronto Balmy Beach (Grey Cup champions)
1931	Sarnia Imperials
1932	Sarnia Imperials
1933	Sarnia Imperials
1934	Sarnia Imperials (Grey Cup champions)
1935	Sarnia Imperials
1936	Sarnia Imperials (Grey Cup champions)
1937	Sarnia Imperials
1938	Sarnia Imperials
1939	Sarnia Imperials
1940	Toronto Balmy Beach
1941	Hamilton Flying Wildcats
1942	Toronto RCAF Hurricanes (Grey Cup champions)
1943	Hamilton Flying Wildcats (Grey Cup champions)
1944	Hamilton Flying Wildcats
1945	Toronto Balmy Beach
1946	Toronto Balmy Beach
1947	Ottawa Trojans
1948	Hamilton Tigers
1949	Hamilton Tigers
1950	Toronto Balmy Beach
1951	Sarnia Imperials
1952	Sarnia Imperials
1953	Toronto Balmy Beach
1954	Kitchener-Waterloo Dutchmen
1955	Kitchener-Waterloo Dutchmen
1956	Kitchener-Waterloo Dutchmen
1957	Kitchener-Waterloo Dutchmen
1958	Sarnia Golden Bears
1959	Sarnia Golden Bears
1960	London Lords

=== Most championships ===
- 12 – Sarnia Imperials (1929, 1931–1939, 1951–52)
- 10 – Toronto Balmy Beach (1924–1927, 1930, 1940, 1945–46, 1950, 1953)
- 8 – Hamilton Tigers (1890, 1897, 1903–1906, 1948–49)
- 5 – Ottawa College Football Club (1885–1889)
- 4 – Toronto Parkdale Canoe Club (1909, 1913, 1921–22)
- 4 – Kitchener-Waterloo Dutchmen (1954–1957)
- 3 – Toronto Football Club 1883–84, Toronto Argonauts (1901)
- 3 – Ottawa Rough Riders (1898, 1900, 1902)
- 3 – Toronto Rugby and Athletic Association (1915, 1919–20)
- 3 – Hamilton Flying Wildcats (1941, 1943–44)
- 2 – Osgoode Hall (1891–92)
- 2 – Queen's University (1893–94)
- 2 – University of Toronto Varsity (1895, 1896)
- 2 – Toronto Amateur Athletic Club (1908, 1910)
- 2 – Hamilton Alerts (1911–12)
- 2 – Hamilton Rowing Club (1914, 1923)
- 2 – Sarnia Golden Bears (1958–59)

== Imperial Oil Trophy ==
The Imperial Oil Trophy was awarded to the league's most valuable player.

- 1934 Norm Perry – Sarnia Imperials
- 1935 Hugh "Bummer" Stirling – Sarnia Imperials
- 1936 Syd Reynolds – Toronto Balmy Beach Beachers
- 1937 Ormond Beach – Sarnia Imperials
- 1938 John Ferraro – Montreal Nationals
- 1939 Eddie Thompson – Toronto Balmy Beach Beachers
- 1940 Nick Paithouski – Sarnia 2/26 Battery
- 1941 Al Lenard – Hamilton Wildcats
- 1942 Bill Stukus – Toronto RCAF Hurricanes
- 1943 Bob Cosgrove – Toronto RCAF Hurricanes
- 1944 Joe Krol – Hamilton Wildcats
- 1945 Arnie McWatters – Ottawa Trojans
- 1946 Frank Gnup – Hamilton Wildcats
- 1947 Bob Paffrath – Toronto Indians
- 1948 Frank Filchock – Hamilton Tigers
- 1949 Don "Sleepy" Knowles – Sarnia Imperials
- 1950 Carl Galbreath – Toronto Balmy Beach Beachers
- 1951 Bruce Mattingly – Sarnia Imperials
- 1952 John Pont – Toronto Balmy Beach Beachers
- 1953 Dick Gregory – Toronto Balmy Beach Beachers
- 1954 Bob Celeri – Kitchener-Waterloo Dutchmen
- 1955 Bob Celeri – Kitchener-Waterloo Dutchmen

== See also ==
- Canadian Football League
- Quebec Rugby Football Union
