= 28th Grey Cup =

1940 Canadian Football championship game

Ottawa Rough Riders	Toronto Balmy Beach Beachers
(5–1)	(6–0)
8	2
Head coach: Ross Trimble	Head coach: Alex Ponton
	1	2	3	4	Total
Ottawa Rough Riders	0	1	1	6	8
Toronto Balmy Beach Beachers	0	1	1	0	2
- Date: November 30, 1940
- Stadium: Varsity Stadium
- Location: Toronto
- Attendance: 4,998

28th Grey Cup
Toronto Balmy Beach Beachers	Ottawa Rough Riders
(6–0)	(5–1)
5	12
Head coach: Alex Ponton	Head coach: Ross Trimble
	1	2	3	4	Total
Toronto Balmy Beach Beachers	5	0	0	0	5
Ottawa Rough Riders	1	0	7	4	12
- Date: December 7, 1940
- Stadium: Lansdowne Park
- Location: Ottawa
- Attendance: 1,700

The 28th Grey Cup was played as a two-game series with the first game played on November 30, 1940, before 4,998 fans at Varsity Stadium in Toronto. The second game was played on December 7, 1940, with cold weather and snow contributing to a small attendance of 1,700 fans, at Lansdowne Park in Ottawa. This two-game series format was set up as a result of the Canadian Rugby Union disallowing the Winnipeg Blue Bombers the right to play in the title game due to a rule dispute. Consequently, what would have been the Eastern Final game became a two-game Grey Cup series.

The Ottawa Rough Riders defeated the Toronto Balmy Beach Beachers by a total-points score of 20–7.
