= Varsity Stadium =

Sports stadium at the University of Toronto St. George

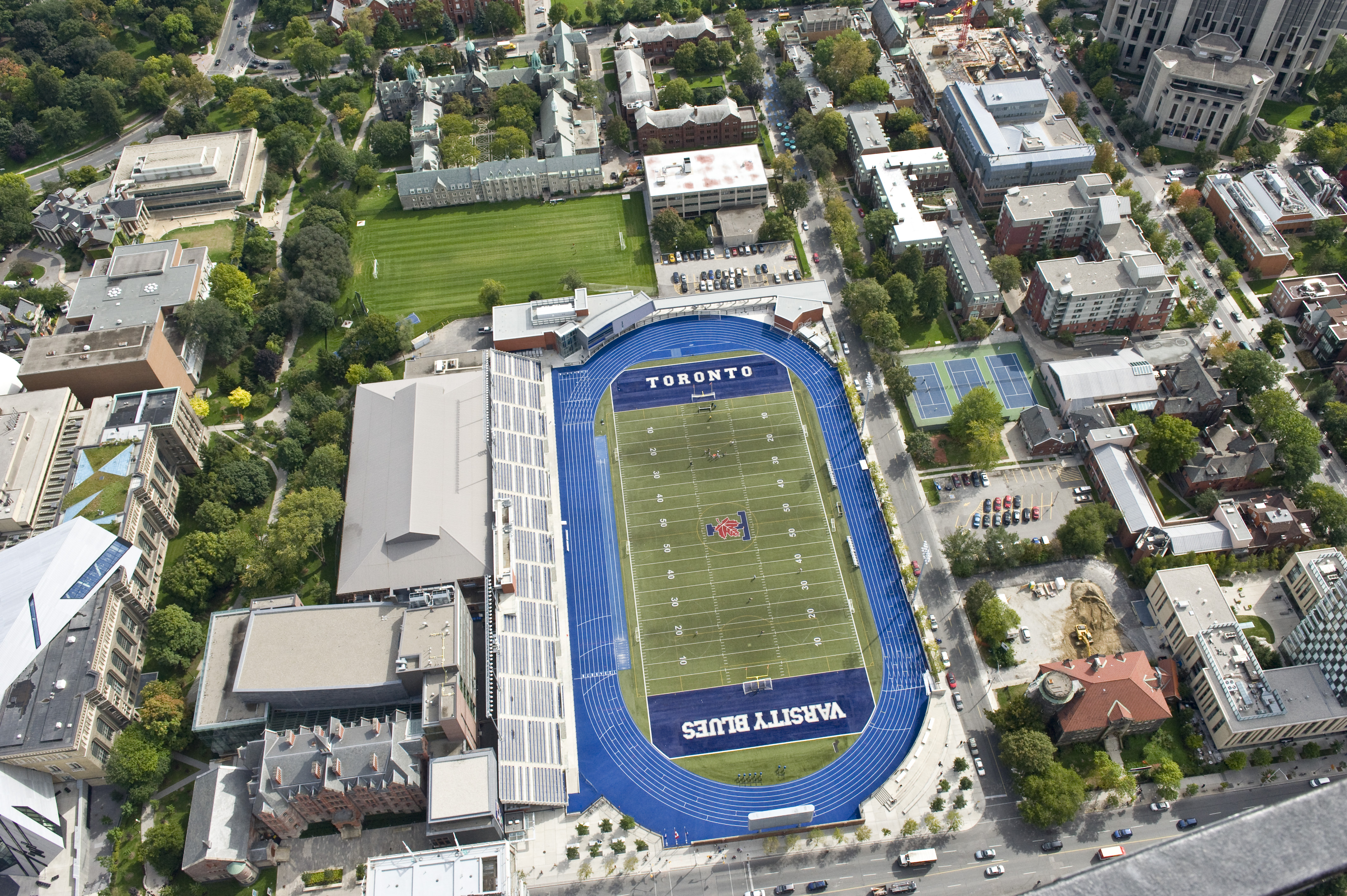
- Aerial view of the stadium and Varsity Centre complex in 2010
- Interactive map of Varsity Stadium
- Address: 299 Bloor Street West; Toronto, Ontario; Canada
- Location: University of Toronto St. George
- Coordinates: 43°40′01″N 79°23′50″W
- Owner: University of Toronto
- Operator: University of Toronto Athletics
- Capacity: 500 (1898–1910); 10,500 (1911–23); 16,000 (1924–49); 21,739 (1950–2001); 1,500 (2003–05); 5,000 (2007–present)
- Type: Stadium
- Surface: Grass (1898–2005); Polytan Ligaturf (2006–2024); FieldTurf Vertex CORE (2024–present)
- Current use: Football; Soccer; Rugby union
- Public transit: at St. George

Construction
- Opened: 1898 (athletic grounds); 1911 (first stadium); 2007 (present stadium)
- Expanded: 1924, 1950
- Demolished: 2002 (first stadium)
- Cost: $61.7 million
- Architects: Craig and Madill (1929–1930); Diamond+Schmitt Architects (2007)

Tenants
- Toronto Varsity Blues (U Sports) teams: football, soccer, rugby (1898–present); Toronto Rush (UFA) (2013–2017, 2019–present); North Toronto Nitros (L1O) (2016–2018); Toronto Lynx (USL) (1997–2001); Toronto Blizzard (NASL/APSL) (1984, 1993); Toronto Metros-Croatia (NASL) (1975–78); Toronto Rifles (ConFL) (1966–1967); Toronto City (USA) (1967); Toronto Falcons (NPSL/NASL) (1967–68); Toronto Argonauts (IRFU/CFL) (1898–1907, 1916–1958); Vanier Cup (1965–72, 1976–88)

Varsity Stadium is an outdoor collegiate stadium of the University of Toronto located at the "Varsity Centre & Arena", a sports complex on the St. George campus that also includes Varsity Arena. It is located on the northern edge of the campus in Toronto, Ontario, Canada. Athletic events have been hosted on the site since 1898; the current stadium was built in 2007 to replace the original permanent stadium built in 1911. Varsity Stadium is also a former home of the Toronto Argonauts, and has previously hosted the Grey Cup, the Vanier Cup, several matches of the 1976 Summer Olympics soccer tournament, and the final game of the North American Soccer League's 1984 Soccer Bowl series (which was also the last game played by the original NASL).

The stadium is home to the Toronto Varsity Blues football, soccer, and rugby teams. It is also the home field for the Toronto Rush professional Ultimate Frisbee Association team.

== History ==
Athletic teams of the University of Toronto have used the site as an athletic ground since 1898. In 1911, the university opened Varsity Stadium.

=== First stadium ===
Canadian sprinter Percy Williams set a world record in the 100 metres with a time of 10.3 seconds at Varsity Stadium during the Canadian Track and Field Championships in 1930.

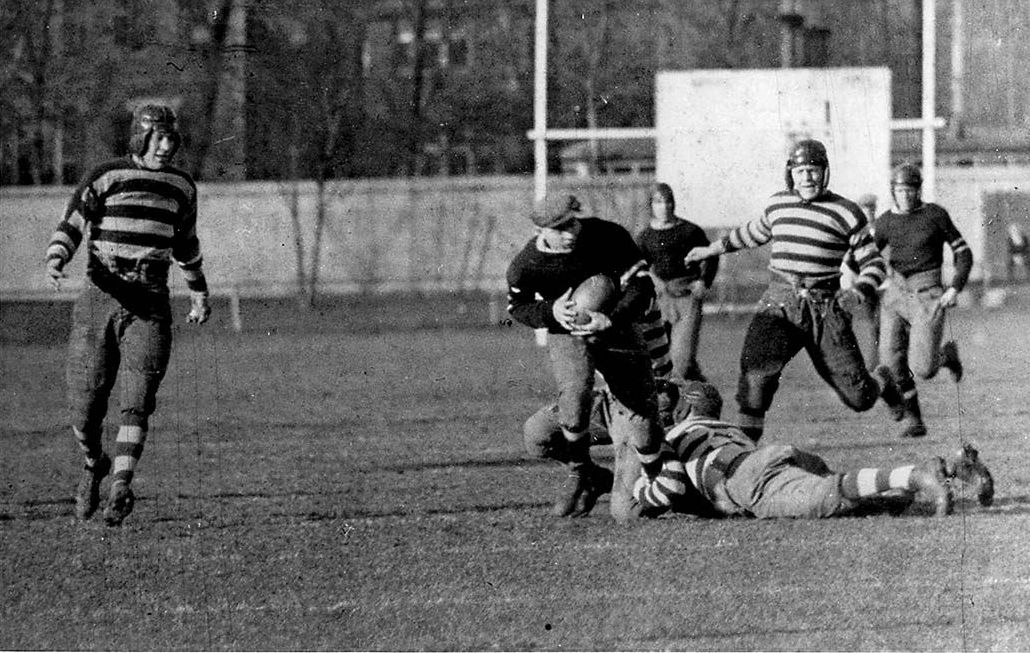
A game between the Toronto Argonauts and the Ottawa Rough Riders at the old Varsity Stadium, November 1924.

Varsity Stadium has for its entire history been host to the University of Toronto's collegiate Canadian football team, the Varsity Blues. However it was, until the opening of Exhibition Stadium in 1959, the home of the Toronto Argonauts of what would become the Canadian Football League. Although it has not hosted a meaningful CFL game in almost half a century, it still holds the record for the number of times any stadium has hosted the Canadian professional football championship game, the Grey Cup. Capacity of the stadium has varied with time, but peaked at about 22,000 in the 1950s although, with the use of temporary bleachers, a record crowd of 27,425 watched the Edmonton Eskimos defeat the Montreal Alouettes 50–27 in the 1956 Grey Cup final. Perhaps the most famous Canadian football game played in the Stadium was the 1950 Mud Bowl for the Grey Cup championship.

During the 1976 Summer Olympics, Varsity Stadium hosted several soccer matches, and was the site of the semi-final game between Brazil and Poland.

The NASL's Toronto Metros-Croatia used Varsity Stadium through 1978, before moving to Exhibition Stadium. They returned six years later as the Toronto Blizzard and again made it their home for the 1984 season. On October 3, 1984, before 16,842 fans, the last game ever contested in the original North American Soccer League was played at Varsity Stadium when the Chicago Sting defeated the Blizzard 3–2 to win the deciding game of 1984 Soccer Bowl Series. The NASL would fold before the start of the next season.

In mid-1986, Varsity Stadium played host to the World Lacrosse Championships, a tournament featuring the United States, Canada, England, and Australia. The US defeated Canada in the final, 18–9.

The new Toronto Blizzard returned to Varsity in 1987 as part of the Canadian Soccer League but would move to the smaller Centennial Park Stadium as a cost-cutting move. They returned in 1993 as a member of the American Professional Soccer League but again were forced to move, this time to Lamport Stadium, again due to financial difficulties. Varsity Stadium continued to host the Canadian intercollegiate championship, the Vanier Cup (as it had been for most years from 1965 to 1988 [with exception of 1973–75]), but that too moved to larger quarters such as SkyDome (now known as Rogers Centre) as the popularity of the collegiate championship grew.

Canada's national soccer team played several matches at Varsity Stadium, including crucial World Cup qualifying matches versus Costa Rica in 1985 and Mexico in 1993. In 1988, Canada hosted the Sir Stanley Matthews Cup at Varsity Stadium. Friendly matches versus Germany and the Netherlands were also staged in 1994.

Minor league professional soccer team Toronto Lynx moved into the stadium in 1997 but was forced to move to Centennial Park Stadium due to the impending demolition of the historic facility.

The stadium was demolished mid-2002 after the cost of maintaining the large facility was far more than it generated in revenue. At that time, several structural sections of the stadium were being held up by temporary repairs, and the future integrity of the structure was in question. The field and track were retained after the demolition. During the demolition and re-building of the site Toronto Varsity Blues relocated to Birchmount Stadium in Scarborough.

=== Second stadium ===
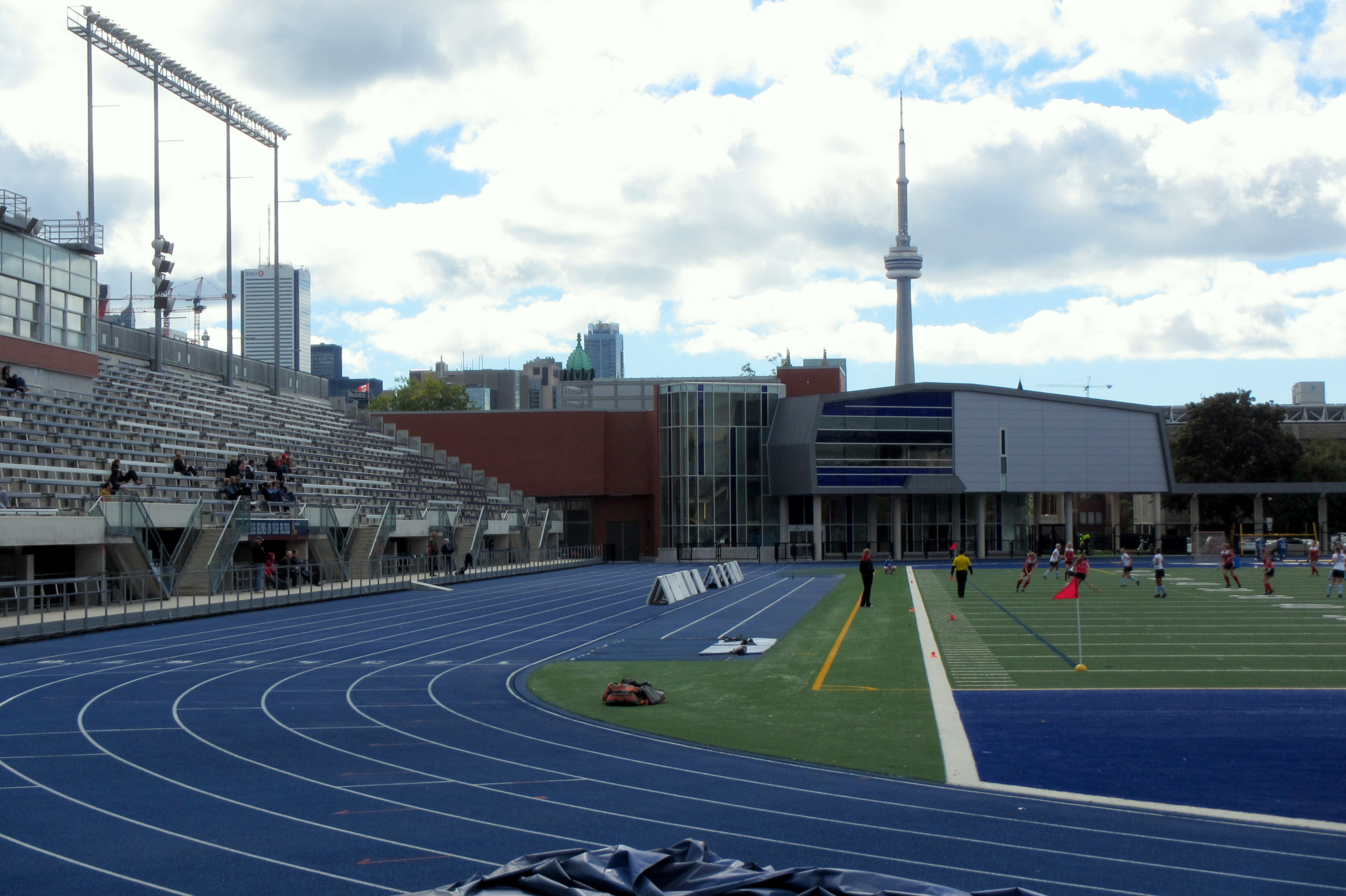
Seats at the new Varsity Stadium are closer to the adjacent arena, making the two structures into a conjoined complex.

From 2003 through 2005, temporary seating of about 1,500 was installed to permit the use of the field for intercollegiate games. The name Varsity Field was used from 2002 to 2006 during the period when the old stadium was demolished and the new stadium was being built.

A plan to build a new 25,000 seat multi-purpose stadium on the site in 2005 was voted down by the governing council of the University of Toronto due to concerns over its cost. The facility was then planned to be built on the grounds of York University but that too failed. At the time of its demolition, Varsity Stadium was the second largest capacity stadium in Canada with a grass field, after Commonwealth Stadium in Edmonton, Alberta (however, that stadium has since switched to an artificial playing surface). The stadium opened in 2007.

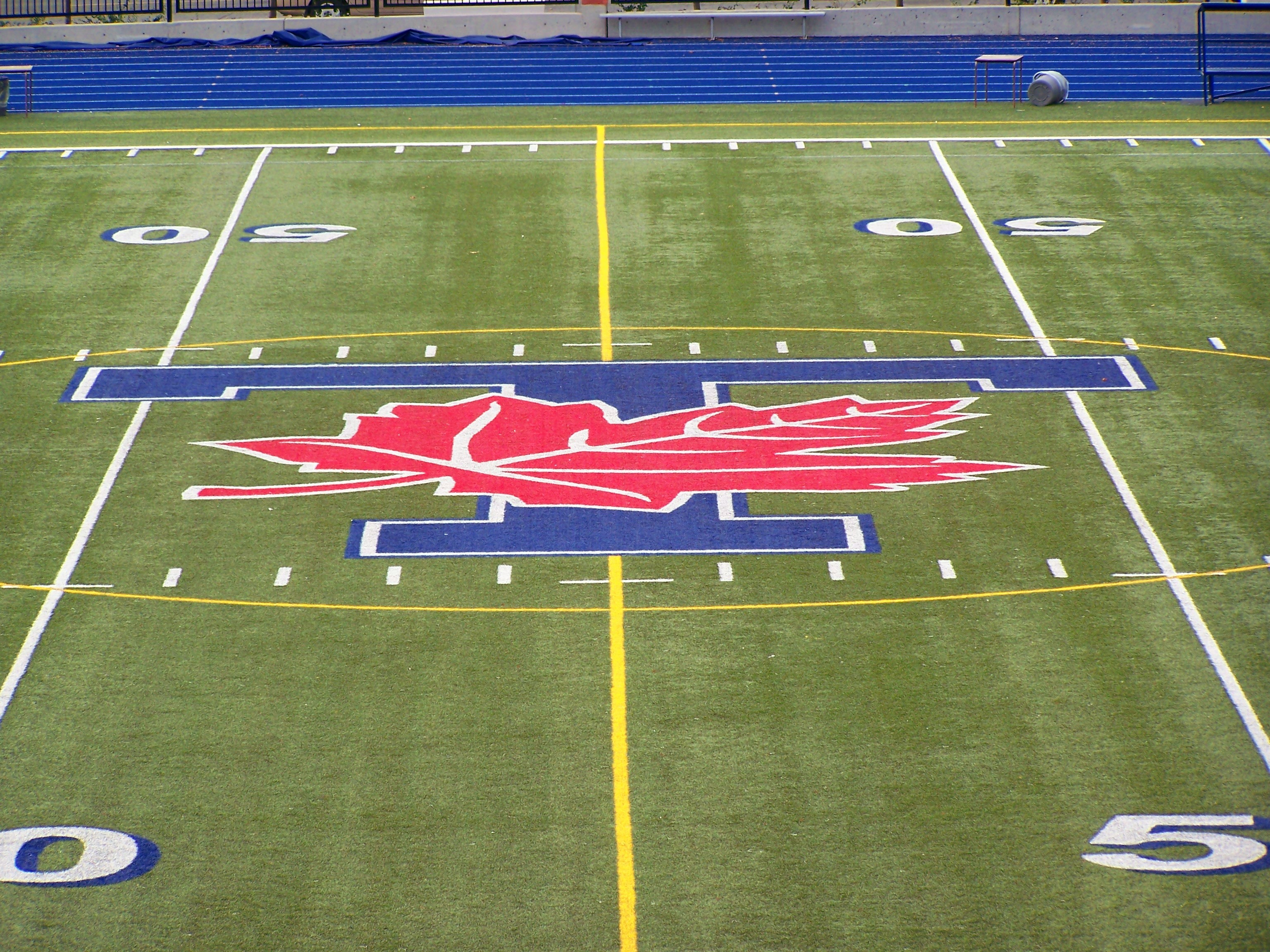
The Varsity Blues "T-leaf" logo on the stadium field.

Facilities and features built in the first phase of the stadium's reconstruction include an IAAF Class II 400m eight-lane track, artificial field turf (FIFA 2 Star rated surface by Polytan), and a winter bubble enabling use during inclement weather. The multi-use capability was one of the main reasons that the plan was passed by the governing council, as opposed to the 25,000-seat stadium. Compared to the old Varsity Stadium, the seating is closer to Varsity Arena, almost making the two structures one conjoined complex. Part of the red brick wall along Bloor Street was maintained for historic purposes, but the new facility is much more open and visible from the streets overall. The new facilities are designed by Diamond and Schmitt Architects.

Following the renovation, the Argonauts returned to the stadium, hosting their 2013 preseason game at their former home. Their 2014 and 2015 preseason home games were also scheduled for the stadium.

For the 2015 Pan American Games the facility hosted archery between July 14 and 18. During the games, the facility was configured to hold roughly 2,000 spectators per session. The facility also hosted the archery events of the 2015 Parapan American Games

== Major events ==
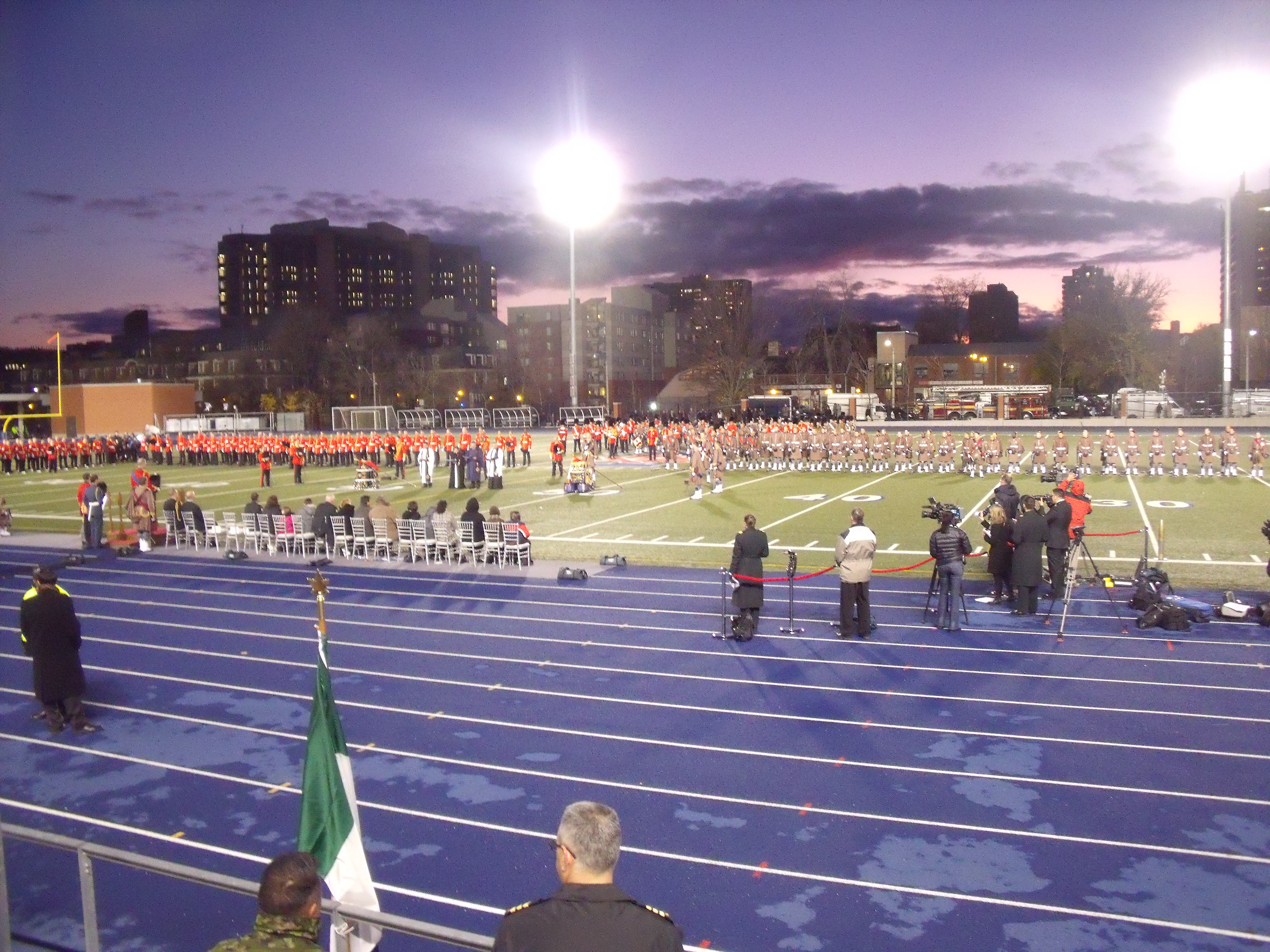
The Presentation of Colours for the Royal Regiment of Canada and the Toronto Scottish Regiment was held at Varsity Stadium.

In addition to hosting several University of Toronto athletic programs, the stadium has also hosted several events including military, musical, and sporting games.

=== Music ===
The stadium has also been host to several concerts, most notably the 1969 Toronto Rock and Roll Revival on September 13, which Rolling Stone once called the second most important event in rock & roll history. This concert led to the production of a documentary, Sweet Toronto, as well as John Lennon's Live Peace In Toronto album. Performers included: The Doors, Plastic Ono Band, Bo Diddley, Chicago Transit Authority (later renamed "Chicago"), Tony Joe White, Alice Cooper, Jerry Lee Lewis, Chuck Berry, Cat Mother & the All Night Newsboys, Gene Vincent, Junior Walker & the All Stars, Little Richard, Doug Kershaw, Screaming Lord Sutch, Nucleus, Milkwood, and Whiskey Howl.

Kiss performed at the stadium during their Destroyer Tour on September 6, 1976. Rush performed at the stadium on September 2, 1979, during their Permanent Waves Warm-up Tour.

=== Sports ===
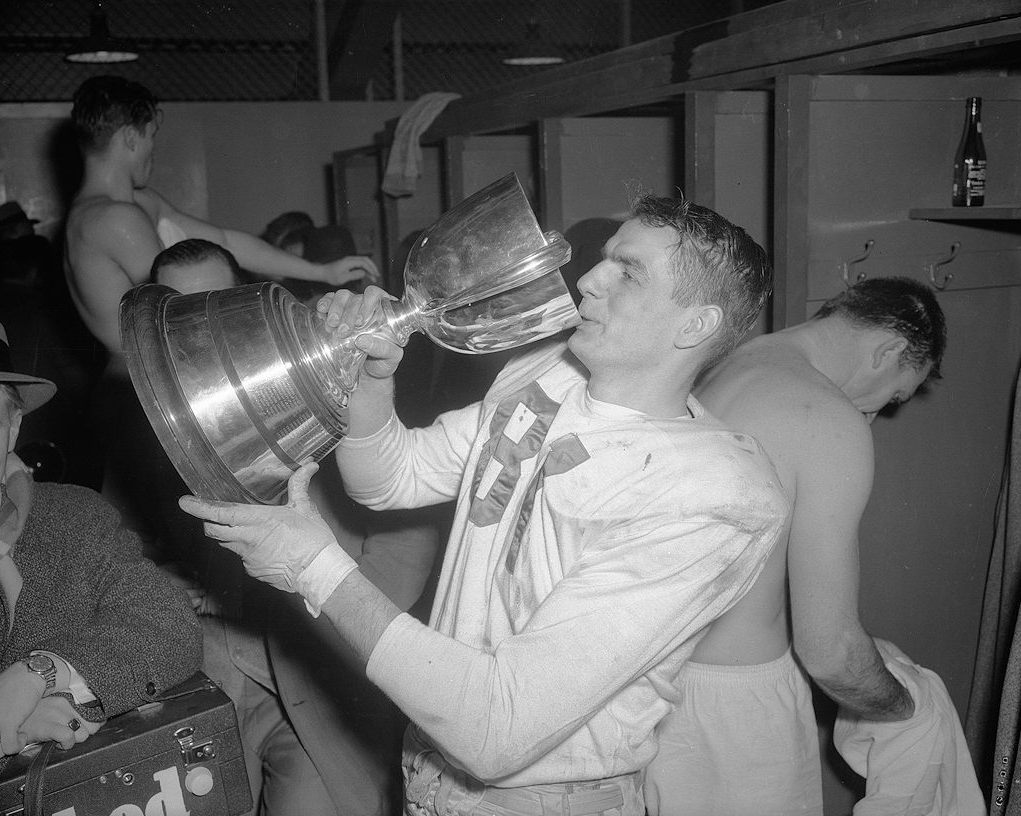
Don Getty celebrates with the Grey Cup in the locker room of Varsity Stadium, after the 44th Grey Cup game

Grey Cups at Varsity Stadium
Game	Date	Winning team	Score	Losing team	Attendance
3rd	November 25, 1911	University of Toronto Varsity Blues (3)	14–7	Toronto Argonauts	13,687
6th	December 5, 1914	Toronto Argonauts	14–2	University of Toronto Varsity Blues	10,500
7th	November 20, 1915	Hamilton Tigers (2)	13–7	Toronto Rowing Association	2,808
8th	December 4, 1920	University of Toronto Varsity Blues (4)	16–3	Toronto Argonauts	10,088
9th	December 3, 1921	Toronto Argonauts (2)	23–0	Edmonton Eskimos	9,558
11th	December 1, 1923	Queen's University (2)	54–0	Regina Rugby Club	8,629
12th	November 29, 1924	Queen's University (3)	11–2	Toronto Balmy Beach	5,978
14th	December 4, 1926	Ottawa Senators (2)	10–7	Toronto Varsity Blues	8,276
15th	November 26, 1927	Toronto Balmy Beach	9–6	Hamilton Tigers	13,676
18th	December 6, 1930	Toronto Balmy Beach (2)	11–6	Regina Roughriders	3,914
22nd	November 24, 1934	Sarnia Imperials	20–12	Regina Roughriders	8,900
24th	December 5, 1936	Sarnia Imperials (2)	26–20	Ottawa Rough Riders	5,883
25th	December 11, 1937	Toronto Argonauts (4)	4–3	Winnipeg Blue Bombers	11,522
26th	December 10, 1938	Toronto Argonauts (5)	30–7	Winnipeg Blue Bombers	18,778
28th	November 30, 1940	Ottawa Rough Riders	8–2	Toronto Balmy Beach	4,998
29th	November 29, 1941	Winnipeg Blue Bombers (3)	18–16	Ottawa Rough Riders	19,065
30th	December 5, 1942	Toronto RCAF Hurricanes	8–5	Winnipeg RCAF Bombers	12,455
31st	November 27, 1943	Hamilton Flying Wildcats	23–14	Winnipeg RCAF Bombers	16,423
33rd	December 1, 1945	Toronto Argonauts (6)	35–0	Winnipeg Blue Bombers	18,660
34th	November 30, 1946	Toronto Argonauts (7)	28–6	Winnipeg Blue Bombers	18,960
35th	November 29, 1947	Toronto Argonauts (8)	10–9	Winnipeg Blue Bombers	18,885
36th	November 27, 1948	Calgary Stampeders	12–7	Ottawa Rough Riders	20,013
37th	November 26, 1949	Montreal Alouettes	28–15	Calgary Stampeders	20,087
38th	November 25, 1950	Toronto Argonauts (9)	13–0	Winnipeg Blue Bombers	27,101
39th	November 24, 1951	Ottawa Rough Riders (4)	21–14	Saskatchewan Roughriders	27,341
40th	November 29, 1952	Toronto Argonauts (10)	21–11	Edmonton Eskimos	27,391
41st	November 28, 1953	Hamilton Tiger-Cats	12–6	Winnipeg Blue Bombers	27,313
42nd	November 27, 1954	Edmonton Eskimos	26–25	Montreal Alouettes	27,328
44th	November 24, 1956	Edmonton Eskimos (3)	50–27	Montreal Alouettes	39,417
45th	November 30, 1957	Hamilton Tiger-Cats (2)	32–7	Winnipeg Blue Bombers	27,425

Vanier Cups at Varsity Stadium
Game	Date	Winning team	Score	Losing team
1st	November 20, 1965	Toronto	14–7	Alberta
2nd	November 19, 1966	St. F.X.	40–14	Waterloo Lutheran
3rd	November 25, 1967	Alberta	10–9	McMaster
4th	November 22, 1968	Queen's	42–14	Waterloo Lutheran
5th	November 21, 1969	Manitoba	24–15	McGill
6th	November 21, 1970	Manitoba (2)	38–11	Ottawa
7th	November 20, 1971	Western	15–14	Alberta
8th	November 25, 1972	Alberta (2)	20–7	Waterloo Lutheran
12th	November 19, 1976	Western (3)	29–13	Acadia
13th	November 19, 1977	Western (4)	48–15	Acadia
14th	November 18, 1978	Queen's (2)	16–3	UBC
15th	November 17, 1979	Acadia	34–12	Western
16th	November 29, 1980	Alberta (3)	40–21	Ottawa
17th	November 28, 1981	Acadia (2)	18–12	Alberta
18th	November 20, 1982	UBC	39–14	Western
19th	November 19, 1983	Calgary	31–21	Queen's
20th	November 24, 1984	Guelph	22–13	Mount Allison
21st	November 30, 1985	Calgary (2)	25–6	Western
22nd	November 22, 1986	UBC (2)	25–23	Western
23rd	November 21, 1987	McGill	47–11	UBC
24th	November 19, 1988	Calgary (3)	52–23	Saint Mary's

1976 Summer Olympics Football Matches at Varsity Stadium
Date	Team #1	Result	Team #2	Round	Attendance
July 18, 1976	Brazil	0–0	East Germany	Group A	21,643
July 19, 1976	Israel	0–0	Guatemala	Group B	9,500
July 21, 1976	North Korea	3–1	Canada	Group D	12,638
July 25, 1976	Brazil	4–1	Israel	Quarter-finals	18,601
July 27, 1976	Poland	2–0	Brazil	Semi-finals	21,743

2015 Pan Am Games at Varsity Stadium
Game	Date
Archery	July 14–18, 2015

== See also ==
- Birchmount Stadium – City of Toronto
- Rob Ford Stadium – City of Toronto
- Lamport Stadium – City of Toronto
- Monarch Park Stadium – Toronto District School Board
- Metro Toronto Track and Field Centre – City of Toronto
- Rosedale Field – City of Toronto
- York Lions Stadium – York University

Events and tenants
Preceded by Rosedale Field	Home of the Toronto Argonauts; 1898–1907	Succeeded by Rosedale Field
Preceded by Rosedale Field	Home of the Toronto Argonauts; 1916–1958	Succeeded by Exhibition Stadium
