= Toronto Indians =

Football team

General information
- Founded: 1941; 85 years ago
- Folded: 1949; 77 years ago
- Stadium: Oakwood Stadium
- Headquartered: Toronto, Ontario, Canada

Personnel
- Head coach: Ted Reeve (1948)

Nickname
- The Tribe

League / conference affiliations
- Ontario Rugby Football Union

The Toronto Indians were a football team from Toronto, Ontario and a member of the Ontario Rugby Football Union, a league that preceded the Canadian Football League. After the Toronto Balmy Beach Beachers moved to the Interprovincial Rugby Football Union in 1941, the Indians began play in the ORFU to fill the void. Ironically, these two teams would merge in 1948 and would continue to be known as the Beachers after that season.

== History ==
The Indians were respectable in their first season of senior competition as the team finished in 2nd place in the ORFU with a .500 record while the league had three teams. For the next three seasons, however, the team would finish near the bottom of the standings winning only four of 25 games with the team missing the playoffs every year. Their fortunes would change, though, as the Indians qualified for the playoffs in each of the next three seasons, including a first-place finish in 1945. Despite their regular season success, the Indians would not have the same fortune in the post-season, having never won a playoff game.

On April 20, 1948, it was announced that the Indians would merge with the Toronto Balmy Beach Beachers and assumed the name Toronto Beaches-Indians for that one season. The amalgamation took place due to the difficulty that the two teams were having in competing for fan support, in addition to the competition from the IRFU's Toronto Argonauts. The team finished in 2nd place that year with a 5-4 record, but lost to the Hamilton Tigers (who had transferred to the ORFU from the more competitive IRFU that year) in the ORFU Finals. On January 4, 1949, the club announced that the amalgamation would end and the Toronto Balmy Beach Beachers would resume play while the Indians would fold.

== Canadian Football Hall of Famers ==
- Jake Gaudaur
- Annis Stukus

== ORFU season-by-season ==
Season	W	L	T	PF	PA	Pts	Finish	Playoffs
1941	2	2	2	46	55	6	2nd, ORFU	Missed playoffs
1942	3	7	0	66	113	6	5th, ORFU	Missed playoffs
1943	1	8	0	36	180	2	6th, ORFU	Missed playoffs
1944	0	6	0	19	168	0	4th, ORFU	Missed playoffs
1945	7	1	0	124	150	14	1st, ORFU	Lost ORFU Finals
1946	8	1	1	176	66	17	2nd, ORFU	Lost ORFU Semi-Finals
1947	4	5	1	99	120	9	4th, ORFU	Lost ORFU Semi-Finals
1948	5	4	0	124	86	10	2nd, ORFU	Lost ORFU Finals

== Oakwood Stadium ==
The Indians played at Oakwood Stadium near Oakwood Avenue and St. Clair Avenue West from 1941 to 1949. After the team left it was used as a racecar track in 1951.

Originally built on Crang farm in 1920s, it served as home field for Oakwood Collegiate Institute and the site is now Luciano's No Frills supermarket.
