= Halfback (Canadian football) =

Canadian football position

The halfback in Canadian football, and most commonly the Canadian Football League, currently refers to the defensive back rather than the running back, as in American football. The defensive halfback lines up inside covering the slotback. They are usually slightly larger than the cornerback to assist the linebackers in stopping the run. They can also be seen backing off the line early, to counter the forward motion of a slotback, which is allowed before the snap in Canadian football.

The cause of the difference in naming between the two positions between the American and Canadian game, which otherwise uses the same names for positions, stems from the early history of the game. In both games, the early formations featured identical offensive and defensive formations, with seven down linemen and four players (five in Canada) in the backfield. Thus, both the offence and defence had quarterbacks, halfbacks and fullbacks. Over the course of the 20th century, the American and Canadian games both placed an increased emphasis on forward passing, resulting in both offensive and defensive formations spreading out and morphing into modern formations. Furthermore, the abolition of the one-platoon system in the 1940s led to a tendency for position names being used on only one side of the ball. The American game, which still held a significant running component (modern American football is more balanced between both running and passing), kept two running backs, which led to the retention of the "halfback" and "fullback" identifications on that side of the ball.

In Canadian football, however, passing was (and still is) a greater portion of the game (due in part to the larger field and one less down in that game) and only one running back was regularly used, leading to the offensive distinction between halfback and fullback eventually becoming obsolete. Historically, the offensive halfback was similar to a slotback and lined up off the tight end, running sweeps, pass patterns and performing blocking duties, but could also run out of the backfield in front of the fullback, much like a standard running back in American football.

The rough equivalents of the halfback position in American football are the strong safety and nickelback.
