= Ottawa Trojans =

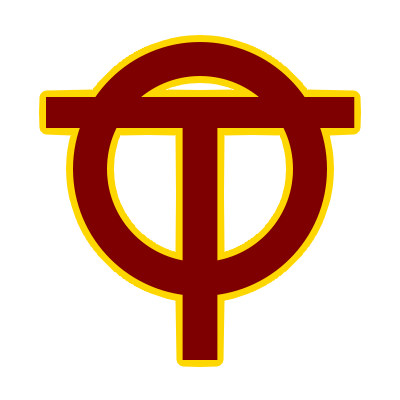
Logo

General information
- Founded: 1943; 83 years ago
- Folded: 1948; 78 years ago (Amalgamated with Ottawa Rough Riders in 1948)
- Stadium: Lansdowne Park
- Headquartered: Ottawa, Ontario, Canada
- Colours: Red and Gold

Personnel
- Head coach: Gordie Perry (1943–1944); Arnie McWatters (1945–1946); Wally Masters (1947)

League / conference affiliations
- Ontario Rugby Football Union

The Ottawa Trojans were a Canadian football team based in Ottawa, Ontario and competed in the Ontario Rugby Football Union from 1943 to 1947. After winning the 1947 ORFU championship, the team would merge with the Ottawa Rough Riders in 1948.

== History ==
The team was first admitted into the ORFU on Friday, July 16, 1943, and played for one season as the Ottawa Combines, supplanting the Kitchener-Waterloo Panthers as the sixth team. The club was renamed the Trojans prior to the 1944 season and wore red and blue uniforms. The team had their most successful season in 1947 where they won the ORFU championship before losing the East Final to the Toronto Argonauts. After the 1947 season, they amalgamated with the Ottawa Rough Riders after the Riders were given exclusive rights to Ottawa's Lansdowne Park playing fields. The new football organization would be known as the Ottawa Rough Riders Football Club and would compete in the 1948 Grey Cup before finally winning it in 1951.

== Seasons ==
Season	W	L	T	PF	PA	Pts	Finish	Playoffs
1943	2	7	0	68	129	4	4th, ORFU	Missed playoffs
1944	3	3	0	74	74	6	3rd, ORFU	Missed playoffs
1945	3	4	0	56	78	6	3rd, ORFU	Missed playoffs
1946	0	10	0	36	127	0	6th, ORFU	Missed playoffs
1947	5	4	1	148	133	11	3rd, ORFU	Lost Eastern Finals
