= 30th Grey Cup =

1942 Canadian Football championship game

| Winnipeg RCAF Bombers | Toronto RCAF Hurricanes |
|---|---|
| (4–1–1) | (8–1–1) |
| 5 | 8 |
| Head coach: Red Threlfall | Head coach: Lew Hayman |
| | 1 | 2 | 3 | 4 | Total |
|---|---|---|---|---|---|
| Winnipeg RCAF Bombers | 0 | 0 | 5 | 0 | 5 |
| Toronto RCAF Hurricanes | 0 | 2 | 5 | 1 | 8 |
- Date: December 5, 1942
- Stadium: Varsity Stadium
- Location: Toronto
- Attendance: 12,455

The 30th Grey Cup was played on December 5, 1942, before 12,455 fans at Varsity Stadium at Toronto.

The Toronto RCAF Hurricanes defeated the Winnipeg RCAF Bombers 8–5.
