= Toronto Balmy Beach Beachers =

Canadian football team based in Toronto, Ontario

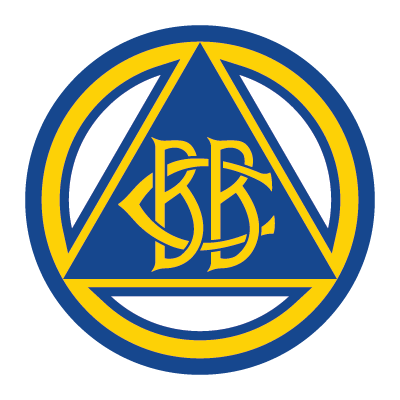
Logo

General information
- Founded: 1924; 102 years ago
- Folded: 1957; 69 years ago
- Stadium: Varsity Stadium
- Headquartered: Toronto, Ontario, Canada
- Colours: Old Gold and Blue

League / conference affiliations
- Ontario Rugby Football Union; ORFU Group 2 (1928); ORFU Eastern (1929–1931)

Championships
- Grey Cup wins: 2; 15th Grey Cup, 18th Grey Cup

The Toronto Balmy Beach Beachers were a Canadian football team based in Toronto, Ontario and a member of the Ontario Rugby Football Union, a league that preceded the Canadian Football League. Spanning three decades, they appeared in four Grey Cup championships, winning twice in 1927 and 1930, and were the longest lasting member of the ORFU.

== History ==
The Beachers were runners-up to the national title in their first season of play in 1924 when they lost to Queen's University in the 12th Grey Cup game. They would go on to win the Grey Cup three years later in 15th Grey Cup, defeating the IRFU's Hamilton Tigers. After another three years, the Beachers would again return to the Grey Cup and were once again victorious, winning the 18th Grey Cup in 1930 in Canadian football over the Regina Roughriders. The Beachers would go on to win the ORFU championship 10 times in their history.

Due to the dominance of the Sarnia Imperials, the Beachers otherwise had very little success in the 1930s, qualifying for the playoffs three other times that decade, only to lose the ORFU Final to the Imperials. It wasn't until 1940 that the team made it back to the Grey Cup, when they lost to the Ottawa Rough Riders in the 28th Grey Cup game, the only Grey Cup to be played as a two-game series. They would continue to see futility as the team would not return to the Grey Cup for the remainder of their history.

On April 20, 1948, it was announced that the Beachers would merge with the Toronto Indians and assumed the name Toronto Beaches-Indians for that one season. The amalgamation took place due to the difficulty that the two teams were having in competing for fan support, in addition to the competition from the IRFU's Toronto Argonauts. The team finished in 2nd place that year with a 5–4 record, but lost to the Hamilton Tigers (who had transferred to the ORFU from the more competitive IRFU that year) in the ORFU Finals. On January 4, 1949, the club announced that the amalgamation would end and the Toronto Balmy Beach Beachers would resume play while the Indians would fold.

In 1953 they won the ORFU Championship and played in the Grey Cup semi-final against the Winnipeg Blue Bombers, losing in a hard fought game. The team struggled in the 1950s as the "Big Four" eastern teams and the five "Western Conference" teams began importing American players. The Beach was unable to pay the big salaries of the other two leagues and maintained an all-Canadian team which became increasingly less competitive. Despite a winning record (6–4) in 1956, their 1957 season was a disaster, losing all twelve games by a combined score of 570–35; the team folded at season's end. Many Canadian Balmy Beach players played with the "Big Four" and "Western Conference" teams and have since entered the Canadian Football Hall of Fame.

== Canadian Football Hall of Famers ==
- Ab Box
- Dean Griffing
- Ted Reeve
- Mike Rodden
- Annis Stukus
- Bill Zock

== Season-by-season ==
Season	W	L	T	PF	PA	Pts	Finish	Playoffs
1924	3	1	0	28	30	6	1st, ORFU	Lost 12th Grey Cup
1925	5	1	0	73	37	10	1st, ORFU	Lost East Semi-Final
1926	5	0	0	47	18	10	1st, ORFU	Lost East Final
1927	5	1	0	100	19	10	1st, ORFU	Won 15th Grey Cup
1928	4	0	0	103	6	8	1st, ORFU Group 2	Lost ORFU Semi-Final
1929	6	0	0	104	27	12	1st, ORFU Eastern	Lost ORFU Final
1930	4	0	0	74	44	8	1st, ORFU Eastern	Won 18th Grey Cup
1931	3	1	0	52	4	6	1st, ORFU Eastern	Lost ORFU Final
1932	4	1	1	60	40	9	2nd, ORFU	Missed playoffs
1933	3	2	0	52	64	6	2nd, ORFU	Missed playoffs
1934	0	6	0	32	84	0	4th, ORFU	Missed playoffs
1935	2	2	0	59	17	4	2nd, ORFU	Lost ORFU Finals
1936	3	1	0	62	35	6	2nd, ORFU	Lost ORFU Final
1937	1	1	1	41	23	3	2nd, ORFU	Missed playoffs
1938	3	3	0	73	33	6	3rd, ORFU	Missed playoffs
1939	3	2	1	58	27	7	3rd, ORFU	Missed playoffs
1940	6	0	0	75	12	12	1st, ORFU	Lost 28th Grey Cup
1941	2	4	0	27	34	4	3rd, ECU	Missed playoffs
1942	7	3	0	125	89	14	2nd, ORFU	Lost ORFU Final
1943	8	2	0	148	74	16	2nd, ORFU	Lost ORFU Final
1944	4	2	0	105	33	8	2nd, ORFU	Lost ORFU Final
1945	6	2	0	112	66	12	2nd, ORFU	Lost Eastern Final
1946	6	4	0	112	64	12	3rd, ORFU	Lost Eastern Final
1947	7	3	0	103	100	14	2nd, ORFU	Lost ORFU Semi-Finals
1948	5	4	0	124	86	10	2nd, ORFU	Lost ORFU Finals
1949	1	11	0	55	290	2	4th, ORFU	Missed playoffs
1950	6	2	0	162	100	12	1st, ORFU	Lost Eastern Finals
1951	7	3	0	173	124	14	2nd, ORFU	Lost ORFU Finals
1952	8	3	0	215	156	16	2nd, ORFU	Lost ORFU Finals
1953	8	4	0	252	145	16	3rd, ORFU	Lost Grey Cup Semi-Final
1954	1	11	0	169	280	2	3rd, ORFU	Missed playoffs
1955	1	11	0	101	319	2	3rd, ORFU	Missed playoffs
1956	6	4	0	203	183	12	2nd, ORFU	Lost ORFU Semi-Finals
1957	0	12	0	35	570	13	4th, ORFU	Missed playoffs
