= Louis Segatore =

Profile
- Positions: Guard, Tackle

Personal information
- Born: Montreal, Quebec, Canada
- Died: November 2000

Career information
- College: Loyola College

Career history
- 1935: Montreal AAA Winged Wheelers
- 1937: Montreal Indians
- 1938: Montreal Cubs
- 1939: Montreal Royals
- 1940–41: Montreal Bulldogs
- 1943: Verdun Grads
- 1944: St. Hyacinthe-Donnacona Navy

Awards and highlights
- Grey Cup champion (1944)

Louis Segatore was a Grey Cup champion Canadian Football League player. He was a lineman.

A native Montrealer, Segatore played football with Loyola College. He was a fixture with nearly every team that played in Montreal during the pre-CFL days. He started with the famed Montreal AAA Winged Wheelers during their final season, and played with the Montreal Indians, Montreal Cubs, Montreal Royals and Montreal Bulldogs prior to World War Two. After the war shut down many teams, he coached and played with the Verdun Grads in 1943, and the next year won the Grey Cup with the St. Hyacinthe-Donnacona Navy team. He later coached high school football in Montreal for many years. His brother, Orlando Segatore, was a Grey Cup champion with the Montreal Alouettes.
