= Canadian Football Hall of Fame =

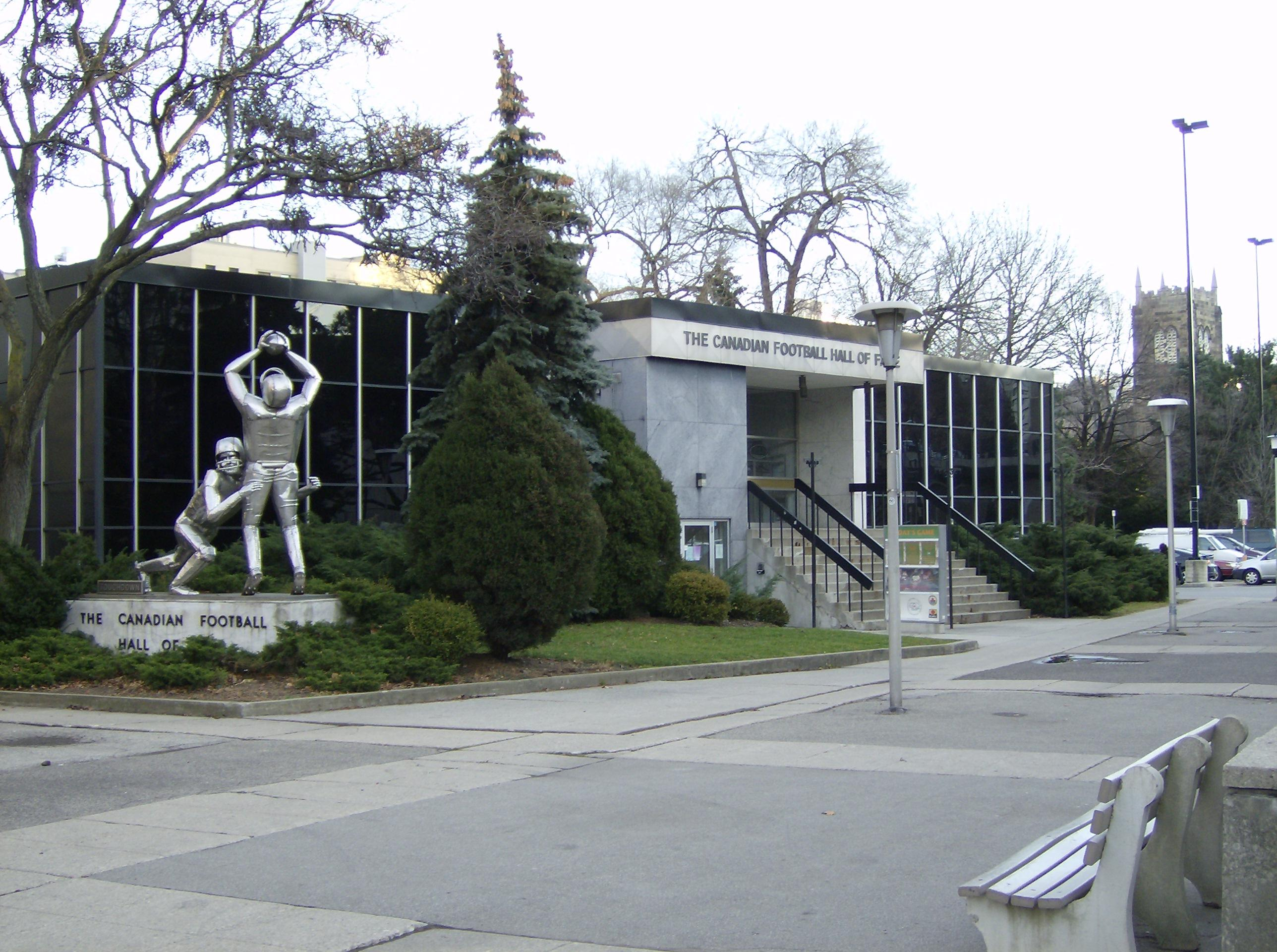
- The old venue for the Hall of Fame and Museum in 2007
- Established: 1972
- Location: Tim Hortons Field; 64 Melrose Avenue North, Hamilton, Ontario, Canada
- Type: Canadian football museum
- Executive director: Eric Noivo
- Website: www.cfhof.ca

The Canadian Football Hall of Fame (CFHOF) is a not-for-profit corporation, located in Hamilton, Ontario, that celebrates achievements in Canadian football. It is maintained by the Canadian Football League (CFL). It includes displays about the CFL, Canadian university football and Canadian junior football history.

The Hall previously had a main feature in the central portion of the museum where the metal busts of inducted members were displayed prior to the physical building being closed. There were also featured displays that highlight each CFL team's history, and an interactive field goal kicking exhibit. The CFHOF is currently changing to a de-centralized model, which does not include a main museum building.

Once during every CFL season, the Hall sponsors the induction ceremony of former players. Included in the "Hall of Fame Weekend" is a regular season game, usually (but not always) affiliated with the Hamilton Tiger-Cats. Traditionally, the inducted players will come to the Hall and make an acceptance speech in front of the building where their newly sculpted bust is unveiled. A player must be retired from the game for at least three years before being eligible for consideration. A Hall of Fame voting committee is composed of sports writers, selected CFL executives and inducted members.

== History ==
The Canadian Football Hall of Fame officially opened on November 28, 1972. The building was designed by Munro Ploen & Associates of Hamilton. Originally located in downtown Hamilton, it moved to Tim Hortons Field, home of the Hamilton Tiger-Cats, in 2016. The Canadian Football Hall of Fame was awarded to the City of Hamilton in June 1963 following the invitation of Mayor Lloyd Douglas Jackson. The Hamilton Parks Board offered a space near Civic Stadium. In 1963, Ivan Miller, former sports editor of The Hamilton Spectator, was named the first curator. Soon after, the Board of Education purchased the land and building. The Hall moved to its new location in 1972 and closed on September 19, 2015. In 2015, responsibility for the museum moved from the City of Hamilton to the CFL.

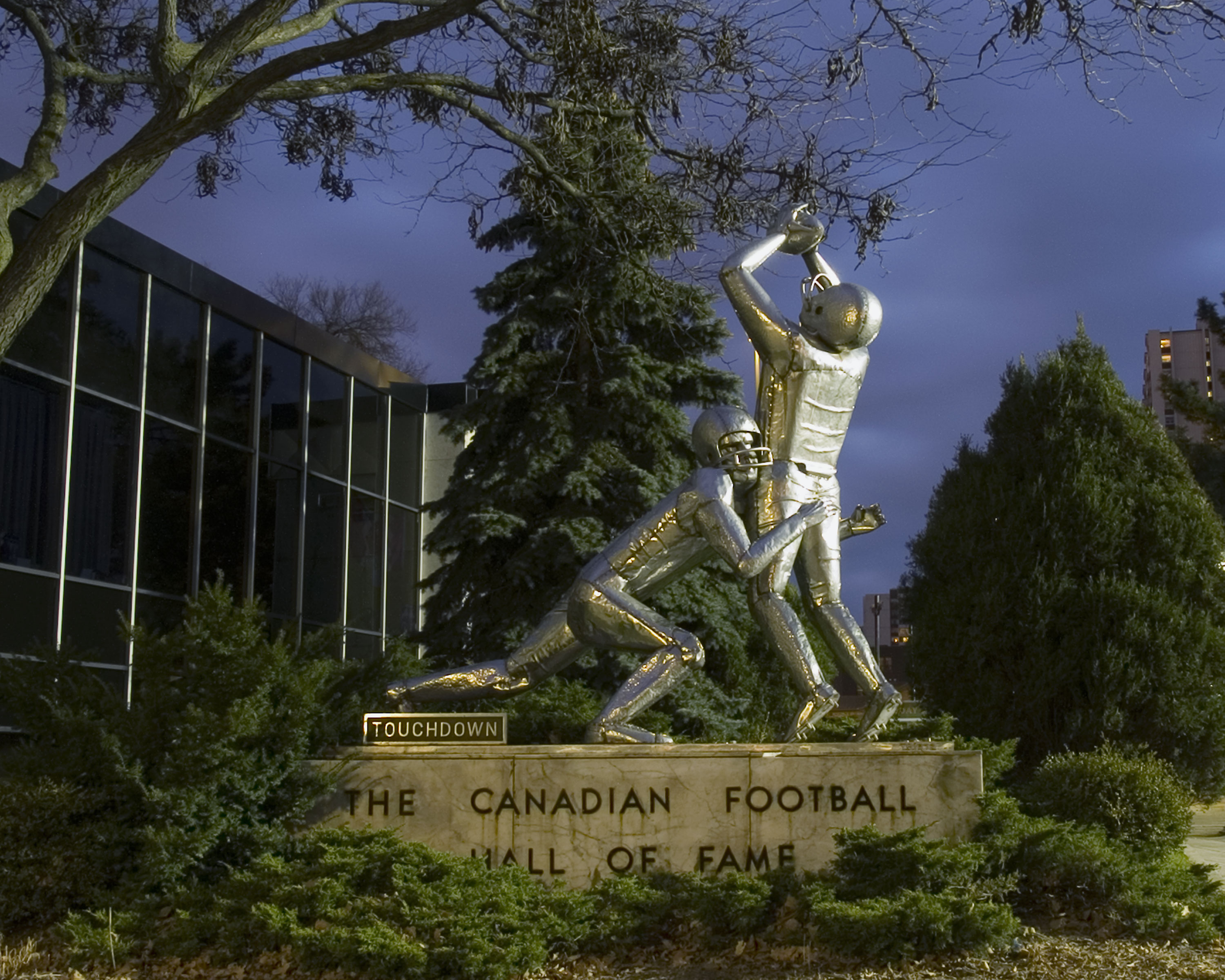
Touchdown sculpture was located outside the Hall of Fame until 2018.

The old Canadian Football Hall of Fame building was easily identified by the slightly-larger-than-life metal sculpture Touchdown, featuring a successful receiver being tackled. The sculpture has since been moved to Tim Hortons Field Gate 3. Tim Hortons Field also has 3 display areas – the Grey Cup display at Gate 3, the Media Hall of Fame Wing in the press box area, and the main display area in the premium level concourse. The main display area will feature all 296 busts (as of March 2018) and rotating displays of various artifacts. The displays are accessible during Hamilton Tiger-Cats home games (club-level display open to all ticket holders 15 minutes after the end of the game). The CFHOF also has travelling displays for different CFL team home fields, the Grey Cup, and other events.

== Canadian Football Hall of Famers ==
=== A ===
- Jack Abendschan – player (K/OG), 2012 (Saskatchewan Roughriders 1965–75).
- Bob Ackles – builder, 2002 (BC Lions as general manager 1975–86, president 2002–2008, and other duties since 1954).
- Junior Ah You – player (DE), 1997 (Montreal Alouettes 1972–81).
- Roger Aldag – player (C/OG), 2002 (Saskatchewan Roughriders 1976–91).
- Damon Allen – player (QB), 2012 (Edmonton Eskimos 1985–88, 1993–94; Ottawa Rough Riders 1989–91; Hamilton Tiger-Cats 1992; Memphis Mad Dogs 1995; BC Lions 1996–2002; Toronto Argonauts 2003–2007).
- Kelvin Anderson – player (RB), 2017 (Calgary Stampeders 1996–2002).
- Tony Anselmo – builder, 2009 (Calgary Stampeders as manager and other tasks 1973-2009).
- Ron Atchison – player (C/MG/DT), 1978 (Saskatchewan Roughriders 1952–68).

=== B ===
- Len Back – builder, 1971 (Hamilton Tigers as manager 1928–40, 1945–49; Hamilton Flying Wildcats as manager 1941–43; Hamilton Tiger-Cats as manager 1950–80).
- Byron Bailey – player (FB/DB), 1975 (BC Lions 1954–64).
- R. Harold Bailey – builder, 1965 (ORFU president 1941; CRU president 1942–45).
- Bill Baker – player (DE), 1994 (Saskatchewan Roughriders 1968–73, 1977–78; BC Lions 1974–76).
- Harold Ballard – builder, 1987 (Hamilton Tiger-Cats as owner and president 1978–89).
- Brandon Banks – player (WR/RS), 2026 (Hamilton Tiger-Cats 2013–2021; Toronto Argonauts 2022).
- Donald Barker – builder, 1999 (for his role in developing league officiating since the 1960s).
- John Barrow – player (OT/DT), 1976 (Hamilton Tiger-Cats 1957–70; Toronto Argonauts as General Manager 1971–75).
- Danny Bass – player (LB), 2000 (Toronto Argonauts 1980; Calgary Stampeders 1981–83; Edmonton Eskimos 1984–91).
- Harry Batstone – player (HB), 1963 (Toronto Argonauts 1919–21; Queen's University 1922–28, later as coach 1929–31).
- Greg Battle – player (LB), 2007 (Winnipeg Blue Bombers 1987–93, 1997–98; Las Vegas Posse/Ottawa Rough Riders 1994; Memphis Mad Dogs 1995; Saskatchewan Roughriders 1996).
- Ormond Beach – player (LB), 1963 (Sarnia Imperials 1934–37).
- Al Benecick – player (OG/OT), 1996 (Saskatchewan Roughriders 1959–68; Edmonton Eskimos 1969).
- Paul Bennett – player (DB), 2002 (Toronto Argonauts 1977–80, 1984; Winnipeg Blue Bombers 1980–83; Hamilton Tiger-Cats 1984–87).
- Sam Berger – builder, 1993 (Ottawa Rough Riders as director, president, a part owner 1930s–1969; Montreal Alouettes as owner and president 1969–81; Canadian Football League president 1964, 1971).
- Leroy Blugh - player (DE), 2015 (Edmonton Eskimos 1989-2000; Toronto Argonauts 2001-2003).
- John Bonk – player (C), 2008 (Hamilton Tiger-Cats 1972–73; Winnipeg Blue Bombers 1973–1985).
- Josh Bourke - player (OL), 2023 (Montreal Alouettes 2007-2015; Toronto Argonauts 2016).
- John Bowman - player (DE), 2023 (Montreal Alouettes 2006-2020).
- Ab Box – player (HB/P), 1965 (Toronto Balmy Beach Beachers 1930–31, 1935–38; Toronto Argonauts 1932–34).
- David Braley – builder, 2012 (Hamilton Tiger-Cats as owner 1987–90; BC Lions as owner 1997–2020; Interim CFL commissioner 2002; Toronto Argonauts as owner 2010–2015).
- Joe Breen – player (RB), 1963 (University of Toronto 1914–15, 1919–20; Toronto Parkdale Canoe Club 1921–23; Toronto Argonauts 1924–25); University of Western Ontario 1929–34 as coach.
- Johnny Bright – player (RB), 1970 (Calgary Stampeders 1952–54; Edmonton Eskimos 1954–64).
- Clyde Brock – player (OT), 2020 (Saskatchewan Roughriders 1965-1975).
- Dieter Brock – player (QB), 1995 (Winnipeg Blue Bombers 1974–83; Hamilton Tiger-Cats 1983–84).
- Tom Brook – builder, 1975 (Calgary Stampeders as club organizer and president 1948–51, director 1956–58).
- Doug Brown – player (DT), 2016 (Calgary Stampeders 1997; Winnipeg Blue Bombers 2001–11).
- D. Wes Brown – builder, 1963 (Ottawa Rough Riders 40-year executive beginning in 1936, holding the roles of director, treasurer, secretary, and other duties).
- Tom Brown – player (LB/MG), 1984 (BC Lions 1961–67).
- Less Browne – player (DB), 2002 (Hamilton Tiger-Cats 1984–88;Winnipeg Blue Bombers 1989–91; Ottawa Rough Riders 1992; BC Lions 1993–94).
- Paul Brule – player (RB/DB), 2018 (Winnipeg Blue Bombers 1968-1971; Montreal Alouettes 1972)
- Wally Buono – builder, 2014 (Calgary Stampeders as head coach 1990–2002; BC Lions as head coach 2003–11 and 2016–2018).
- Willie Burden – player (RB), 2001 (Calgary Stampeders 1974–81).
- Henry Burris - player (QB), 2020 (Ottawa Redblacks, Calgary Stampeders, Saskatchewan Roughriders, Hamilton Tiger-Cats (1997-2017))

=== C ===
- Ben Cahoon – player (WR), 2014 (Montreal Alouettes 1998–2010).
- Anthony Calvillo – player (QB), 2017 (Las Vegas Posse 1994, Hamilton Tiger-Cats 1995–1997, Montreal Alouettes 1998–2013).
- Bob Cameron – player (P), 2010 (Winnipeg Blue Bombers 1980–2002).
- Hugh Campbell – builder, 2000 (Saskatchewan Roughriders as player 1963–68, 1969; Edmonton Eskimos as head coach 1977–82, General manager 1986–97, president and CEO 1998–2006).
- Jerry Campbell – player (LB), 1996 (Calgary Stampeders 1966–68, 1976; Ottawa Rough Riders 1968–75).
- Tom Casey – player (RB), 1964 (Hamilton Wildcats 1949; Winnipeg Blue Bombers 1950–54, 1956).
- Ken Charlton – player (RB/FW), 1992 (Saskatchewan Roughriders 1941, 1948–54; Winnipeg RCAF Bombers 1942; Regina All-Services Roughriders 1943; Ottawa Rough Riders 1945–47).
- Freddie Childress – player (OT), 2020 (Shreveport Pirates 1994; Birmingham Barracudas 1995; Calgary Stampeders 1996-2003; Saskatchewan Roughriders 2004-2006).
- Arthur Chipman – builder, 1969 (Winnipeg Blue Bombers as president 1944–48; WIFU president 1949 and CRU president 1952).
- Bryan Chiu – player (C), 2025 (Montreal Alouettes 1997-2009).
- Frank Clair – builder, 1981 (Toronto Argonauts as head coach 1950–54; Ottawa Rough Riders as head coach 1956–69, general manager 1970–78).
- Bill Clarke – player (OT/DT), 1996 (Saskatchewan Roughriders 1951–64).
- Tom Clements – player (QB), 1994 (Ottawa Rough Riders 1975–78; Saskatchewan Roughriders 1979; Hamilton Tiger-Cats 1979, 1981–83; Winnipeg Blue Bombers 1983–87).
- Mike "Pinball" Clemons – player (RB/KR), 2008 (Toronto Argonauts 1989–2000).
- Tommy Joe Coffey – player (WR/K), 1977 (Edmonton Eskimos 1959–60, 1962–66; Hamilton Tiger-Cats 1967–72; Toronto Argonauts 1973).
- Marvin Coleman – player (CB/KR), 2024 (Calgary Stampeders 1994-2000; Winnipeg Blue Bombers 2001-2003).
- Lionel Conacher – player (K/R), 1963 (Toronto Torontos (ORFU) 1920; Toronto Argonauts 1921–22; Toronto Crosse & Blackwell Chefs 1934).
- Peter Connellan – builder, 2012 (Calgary Dinos as head coach 1977–95).
- Rod Connop – player (OL), 2005 (Edmonton Eskimos 1982–97).
- Ralph W. Cooper – builder, 1992 (Hamilton Tiger-Cats organized the Hamilton merger in 1950, and as president 1950–52; various other roles within the league until the 1970s).
- Jeremaine Copeland – player (WR), 2025 (Montreal Alouettes 2001-2004; Calgary Stampeders 2005-2009; Toronto Argonauts 2010-2011).
- Royal Copeland – player (HB/DB), 1988 (HMCS York Navy 1944; Toronto Argonauts 1945–49, 1952–56; Calgary Stampeders 1950–51).
- Jon Cornish – player (RB), 2019 (Calgary Stampeders 2007-2015).
- Jim Corrigall – player (DE), 1990 (Toronto Argonauts 1970–81).
- Frank Cosentino – builder, 2018.
- Bruce Coulter – builder, 1997 (McGill University as head coach 1958–61; various directorships and presidencies with Canadian university sports).

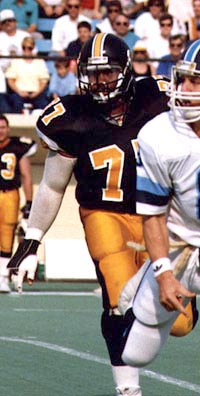
Grover Covington

- Grover Covington – player (DE), 2000 (Hamilton Tiger-Cats 1981–91).
- Chip Cox – player (LB), 2022 (Montreal Alouettes 2006–18).
- Ernie Cox – player (C), 1963 (Hamilton Tigers 1921–31).
- Larry Crawford - player (DE), 2023 (BC Lions 1981-1989; Toronto Argonauts 1989).
- Ross Craig – player (RB), 1964 (Hamilton Alerts 1911–12; Hamilton Tigers 1913–15, 1919–20).
- Hec Crighton – builder, 1985 (served on CRU rules committee in 1947; instrumental in creation of university championship game).
- Carl Cronin – player (QB/LB/K), 1967 (Winnipeg 'Pegs 1932–33; Calgary Bronks 1935–39 as coach).
- Andrew Currie – builder, 1974 (officiating and rules committee 1935–70).
- Gord Currie – builder, 2005 (amateur football coach, notably with the Regina Rams 1965–76).
- Bernie Custis – builder, 1998 (amateur and college football coach 1958–88, notably with McMaster in the 1980s).
- Dave Cutler – player (K), 1998 (Edmonton Eskimos 1969–84).
- Wes Cutler – player (T/E/R), 1968 (University of Toronto 1931–32; Toronto Argonauts 1933–38).

=== D ===
- Peter Dalla Riva – player (TE), 1993 (Montreal Alouettes 1968–81).
- Andrew P. Davies – builder, 1969 (Ottawa Rough Riders as player/coach 1920s, executive officer, and team physician until 1948).
- Eddie Davis - player (DB), 2015 (Birmingham Barracudas 1995; Calgary Stampeders 1996-2000; Saskatchewan Roughriders 2001-2009).
- John DeGruchy – builder, 1963 (president of the CRU 1925, 1930, 1935; president of the ORFU for 25 years).
- Dave Dickenson – player (QB), 2015 (Calgary Stampeders 1996-2000, 2008; BC Lions 2003-2007).

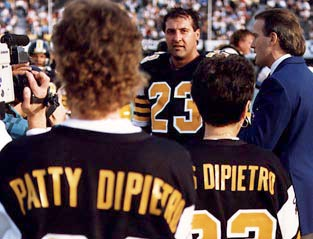
Rocky DiPietro

- Rocky DiPietro – player (SB/WR), 1997 (Hamilton Tiger-Cats 1978–91).
- George Dixon – player (RB), 1974 (Montreal Alouettes 1959–65).
- Paul Dojack – builder, 1978 (30 years of officiating in the west; officiating supervisor in 1971–72).
- Weston Dressler – player 2024 (Saskatchewan Roughriders 2008-2015; Winnipeg Blue Bombers 2016-2018).
- Eric Duggan – builder, 1981 (Calgary Bronks as player 1936; Edmonton Eskimos player 1927–32, executive 1949–60).
- Jacques Dussault - builder, 2023.
- Seppi DuMoulin – builder, 1963 (Hamilton Tigers as player 1894–1906 and later as team president; Winnipeg Blue Bombers honorary coach 1919; later president of WCRFU, ORFU, and IRFU; instrumental in development of football in west during 1900–1920).
- Matt Dunigan – player (QB), 2006 (Edmonton Eskimos 1983–87; BC Lions 1988–89; Toronto Argonauts 1990–91; Winnipeg Blue Bombers 1992–94; Birmingham Barracudas 1995; Hamilton Tiger-Cats 1996; Calgary Stampeders 2004 as coach/GM).

=== E ===
- Ray Elgaard – player (SB), 2002 (Saskatchewan Roughriders 1983–96).
- Solomon Elimimian - player (LB), 2023 (BC Lions 2010-2018; Saskatchewan Roughriders 2019-2020).
- Abe Eliowitz – player (QB/P), 1969 (Ottawa Rough Riders 1933–35; Montreal Indians 1936–37).
- Eddie Emerson – player (C/FB/LB), 1963 (Ottawa Rough Riders 1912–15, 1919–35, 1937, as team president 1930–31, 1947–51).
- Ron Estay – player (DE), 2003 (BC Lions 1972–73; Edmonton Eskimos 1973–82).
- Sam Etcheverry – player (QB), 1969 (Montreal Alouettes 1952–60).
- Keith Evans – builder, 2022 (Calgary Colts 1965–2019).
- Terry Evanshen – player (WR), 1984 (Montreal Alouettes 1965, 1970–73; Calgary Stampeders 1966–69; Hamilton Tiger-Cats 1974–77; Toronto Argonauts 1978).
- Jim Evenson – player (RB), 2026 (BC Lions 1968–72; Ottawa Rough Riders 1973–74).

=== F ===
- Lloyd Fairbanks - player (OG/OT), 2023 (Calgary Stampeders 1975-82, 1989-91; Montreal Concordes 1983-1985; Montreal Alouettes 1986; Hamilton Tiger-Cats 1987-1988).
- Bernie Faloney – player (QB), 1974 (Edmonton Eskimos 1954; Hamilton Tiger-Cats 1957–64; Montreal Alouettes 1965–66; BC Lions 1967).
- Cap Fear – player (OW), 1967 (Toronto Argonauts 1919–25; Montreal AAA Winged Wheelers 1927; Hamilton Tigers 1928–32).
- Dave Fennell – player (DT), 1990 (Edmonton Eskimos 1974–83).
- Mervyn Fernandez – player, 2019 (BC Lions 1982-86 & 1994)
- Johnny Ferraro – player (P/K/QB/FB), 1966 (Hamilton Tigers 1934–35; Montreal Indians 1936–37, 1940; Montreal Nationals (ORFU 1938–39).
- Dan Ferrone – player (OG), 2013 (Toronto Argonauts 1981–88, 1990–92; Calgary Stampeders 1989).
- Norm Fieldgate – player (DE/OE/LB/DB), 1979 (BC Lions 1954–67).
- Scott Flagel – player (DB), 2025 (Winnipeg Blue Bombers 1982-87; Calgary Stampeders 1988; Hamilton Tiger-Cats 1988-1989; Ottawa Rough Riders 1989-1991).
- Willie Fleming – player (RB), 1982 (BC Lions 1959–66).
- Scott Flory – player, 2018 (Montreal Alouettes 1999-2013).
- Darren Flutie – player (WR), 2007 (BC Lions 1991–96; Edmonton Eskimos 1996–97; Hamilton Tiger-Cats 1998–2002).
- Doug Flutie – player (QB), 2008 (BC Lions 1990–91; Calgary Stampeders 1992–95; Toronto Argonauts 1996–1997).
- Chris Flynn – player (QB), 2011 (Saint Mary's Huskies 1987–1990; Ottawa Rough Riders 1996).
- Sidney Forster – builder, 2001 (instrumental in amateur football, notably the Northern Football Conference as coach and president).
- William C. Foulds – builder, 1963 (University of Toronto as player 1908–10; Toronto Argonauts as head coach 1911, 1914–15; various positions in CRU).
- Gino Fracas – builder, 2011 (University of Alberta as head coach 1963–66; University of Windsor as head coach 1968–87).
- Bill Frank – player (OT/DT), 2001 (BC Lions 1962–64; Toronto Argonauts 1965–68; Winnipeg Blue Bombers 1968–76).
- Brian Fryer – player (WR), 2013 (University of Alberta 1972–1975, Edmonton Eskimos 1978–85; Ottawa Rough Riders 1985).
- Greg B. Fulton – builder, 1995 (major statistician for the CFL from 1966 to 1973 and a member of rules committee).

=== G ===
- Tony Gabriel – player (TE), 1984 (Hamilton Tiger-Cats 1971–74; Ottawa Rough Riders 1975–81).
- Gene Gaines – player (HB), 1994 (Montreal Alouettes 1961, 1970–76; Ottawa Rough Riders 1962–1969).

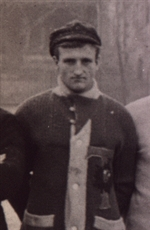
Hugh Gall

- Hugh Gall – player (HB/K), 1963 (University of Toronto 1908–12, 1914 as coach; Toronto Parkdale Canoe Club 1913).
- Jake Gaudaur – builder, 1984 (Hamilton Tigers and Hamilton Tiger-Cats as player 1940, 1948–53, director 1952–53, president 1954–55, general manager 1956–67; Toronto Argonauts as player 1941; Toronto RCAF Hurricanes as player 1942; Toronto Indians as player 1945–46; Montreal Alouettes as player 1947; CFL commissioner 1968–84).
- Ed George – player (OL), 2005 (Montreal Alouettes 1970–74; Hamilton Tiger-Cats 1978–80).
- Frank M. Gibson – builder, 1996 (Hamilton Tiger-Cats as organizing the merger in 1950 and serving in various executive roles until 1983).
- Tony Golab – player (RB/FW), 1964 (Sarnia Imperials 1938; Ottawa Rough Riders 1939–41, 1945–50; Ottawa RCAF Uplands 1942).
- Vince Goldsmith – player (DE, LB), 2024 (Saskatchewan Roughriders 1981-83, 1988-90; Toronto Argonauts 1984; Calgary Stampeders 1985-87).
- Miles Gorrell – player (OT), 2013 (Calgary Stampeders 1978–82; Ottawa Rough Riders 1982; Montreal Concordes 1982–85; Hamilton Tiger-Cats 1985–91, 1996; Winnipeg Blue Bombers 1992–95).
- Bud Grant – builder, 1983 (Winnipeg Blue Bombers as player 1953–56, later as head coach 1957–66). He was the first coach to be a member of both the Canadian Football Hall of Fame and the Pro Football Hall of Fame (NFL).
- Tommy Grant – player (RB), 1995 (Hamilton Tiger-Cats 1956–68; Winnipeg Blue Bombers 1969).
- Herb Gray – player (DE/OG), 1983 (Winnipeg Blue Bombers 1956–65).
- S. J. Green – player (WR), 2024 (Montreal Alouettes 2007-2016; Toronto Argonauts 2017-2019).
- Terry Greer – player (WR), 2019, (Toronto Argonauts 1980–85).

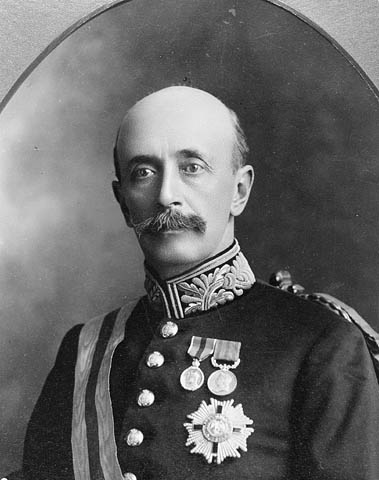
Albert Grey, 4th Earl Grey

- Albert Grey, 4th Earl Grey – builder, 1963 (for donating the Grey Cup trophy in 1909).
- Dean Griffing – player (C), 1965 (Regina Roughriders 1936–43, later as team manager 1953–57; Toronto Balmy Beach Beachers 1944; Calgary Stampeders 1945–47, also as coach/part owner;).
- Harry Crawford Griffith – builder, 1966 (University of Toronto as player/head coach 1908–10; president of the CRU 1913 and later served on rules committee).

=== H ===
- Darryl Hall – player (LB, DB), 2025 (Calgary Stampeders 1990-92, 1996-2000).
- Sydney Halter – builder, 1966 (Winnipeg Blue Bombers as executive 1934–53; first commissioner of the CFL 1958–66).
- Tracy Ham – player (QB), 2010 (Edmonton Eskimos 1987–92; Toronto Argonauts 1993; Baltimore Stallions 1994–95; Montreal Alouettes 1996–99).
- Frank Hannibal – builder, 1963 (Winnipeg Blue Bombers as president 1934–36, 1941, instrumental in bringing the Grey Cup west for the first time).
- Fritz Hanson – player (RB), 1963 (Winnipeg Blue Bombers 1935–46; Calgary Stampeders 1947–48).
- Rodney Harding – player (DT), 2016 (Toronto Argonauts 1985–94; Memphis Mad Dogs 1995; Calgary Stampeders 1996).
- Dickie Harris – player (DB), 1998 (Montreal Alouettes 1972–80; Montreal Concordes 1982).
- Wayne Harris – player (LB), 1976 (Calgary Stampeders 1961–72).
- Herm Harrison – player (LB/TE), 1993 (Calgary Stampeders 1964–72).
- Larry Haylor – builder, 2014 (University of Saskatchewan as coach 1971–73; University of Western Ontario as coach 1984–2006).
- Lew Hayman – builder, 1975 (Toronto Argonauts as coach 1932–40, later as executive 1955–83; Toronto RCAF Hurricanes as coach 1941–45; Montreal Alouettes as club organizer, coach, GM, and part owner 1946–54).
- John Helton – player (DE/DT), 1985 (Calgary Stampeders 1969–78; Winnipeg Blue Bombers 1979–82).
- Ed Henick – builder, 2003 (amateur football coach, promoter, and organizer, notably with Saskatoon Hilltops 1947–1964).
- Garney Henley – player (DB/WR), 1979 (Hamilton Tiger-Cats 1960–75).
- Larry Highbaugh – player (DB), 2004 (BC Lions 1971–72; Edmonton Eskimos 1972–83).
- Tom Hinton – player (G), 1991 (BC Lions 1958–66).
- Condredge Holloway – player (QB), 1998 (Ottawa Rough Riders 1975–80; Toronto Argonauts 1981–86; BC Lions 1987).
- Jim Hopson – builder, 2019
- Dick Huffman – player (OT/DT), 1987 (Winnipeg Blue Bombers 1951–55; Calgary Stampeders 1956–57).
- John Hufnagel – builder, 2020
- Billy Hughes – builder, 1974 (Montreal AAA Winged Wheelers as coach 1919–22; Queen's University as coach 1922–26; Ottawa Rough Riders as coach 1935–36; Lachine RCAF Manning Pool (QRFU) as coach 1942–43).
- Charleston Hughes – player (DE), 2026 (Calgary Stampeders 2008, 2009–17; Hamilton Tiger-Cats 2018; Saskatchewan Roughriders 2018–20, 2022; Toronto Argonauts 2021).
- Tommy Hugo – player (C, LB), 2018 (Montreal Alouettes 1953-59).

=== I ===
- Hank Ilesic – player (P, PK), 2018 (Edmonton Eskimos 1977-82, 2001; Toronto Argonauts 1983-93; Hamilton Tiger-Cats 1994-95; BC Lions 1998).
- Jake Ireland – builder, 2013 (Referee 1979–2008).
- Bob Isbister – player (FW), 1965 (Hamilton Tigers 1906–15, 1919).
- Frank "Pop" Ivy – builder, 2026 (Edmonton Eskimos as coach 1954–57).

=== J ===
- Russ Jackson – player (QB), 1973 (Ottawa Rough Riders 1958–69; Toronto Argonauts 1975–76 as coach).
- Jack Jacobs – player (QB), 1963 (Winnipeg Blue Bombers 1950–54).
- Eddie James – player (FW), 1963 (Regina Roughriders 1920s–1930s; Regina Pats 1928; Winnipeg St. John's 1930, 1932; Winnipeg 'Pegs 1935).
- Gerry James – player (RB), 1981 (Winnipeg Blue Bombers 1952–55, 1957–62; Saskatchewan Roughriders 1964).
- Ray Jauch – builder 2024
- Alondra Johnson – player (LB), 2009 (BC Lions 1989–90; Calgary Stampeders 1991–2003; Saskatchewan Roughriders 2004).
- Brent Johnson – player (DE), 2018 (BC Lions 2001–2011).
- Glen Johnson – builder, 2025 (spent 24 years as a CFL on-field official)
- Will Johnson – player (DL), 2021 (Calgary Stampeders 1989–1996; Saskatchewan Roughriders 1997).
- Tyrone Jones – player (LB), 2012 (Winnipeg Blue Bombers 1983–87, 1989–1991; Saskatchewan Roughriders 1992; BC Lions 1993).
- Bobby Jurasin – player (DE), 2006 (Saskatchewan Roughriders 1986–1997; Toronto Argonauts 1998).

=== K ===
- Greg Kabat – player (FW/G/QB), 1996 (Winnipeg Blue Bombers 1933–1940; Vancouver Grizzlies, 1941 as player/coach).
- Joe Kapp – player (QB), 1984 (Calgary Stampeders 1959–61; BC Lions 1961–66).
- Jerry Keeling – player (DB/QB), 1989 (Calgary Stampeders 1961–72; Ottawa Rough Riders 1973–75; Hamilton Tiger-Cats 1975).
- Brian Kelly – player (WR), 1991 (Edmonton Eskimos 1979–87).
- Ellison Kelly – player (G/T/DE/LB), 1992 (Hamilton Tiger-Cats 1960–70; Toronto Argonauts 1971–72).
- Danny Kepley – player (LB), 1996 (Edmonton Eskimos 1975–84).
- Eagle Keys – builder, 1990 (Montreal Alouettes as player 1949–51; Edmonton Eskimos as player 1952–54 and as coach 1959–63; Saskatchewan Roughriders as coach 1965–70; BC Lions as coach 1971–75).
- Norm Kimball – builder, 1991 (Edmonton Eskimos as president and COO 1961–1985; Montreal Alouettes as partial owner 1986–87).
- Tuffy Knight – builder, 2007 (Wilfrid Laurier University as coach 1966–83; Toronto Argonauts as Director of Player Personnel 1984–88; University of Waterloo as coach 1988–97).
- Robert A. Kramer – builder, 1987 (Saskatchewan Roughriders as president 1951–53, 1961–65; president WIFU 1960).
- Joe Krol – player (RB/QB), 1963 (Hamilton Flying Wildcats 1942–44; Toronto Argonauts 1945–52, 1955).
- Norman Kwong – player (RB), 1969 (Calgary Stampeders 1948–50; Edmonton Eskimos 1951–60).

=== L ===
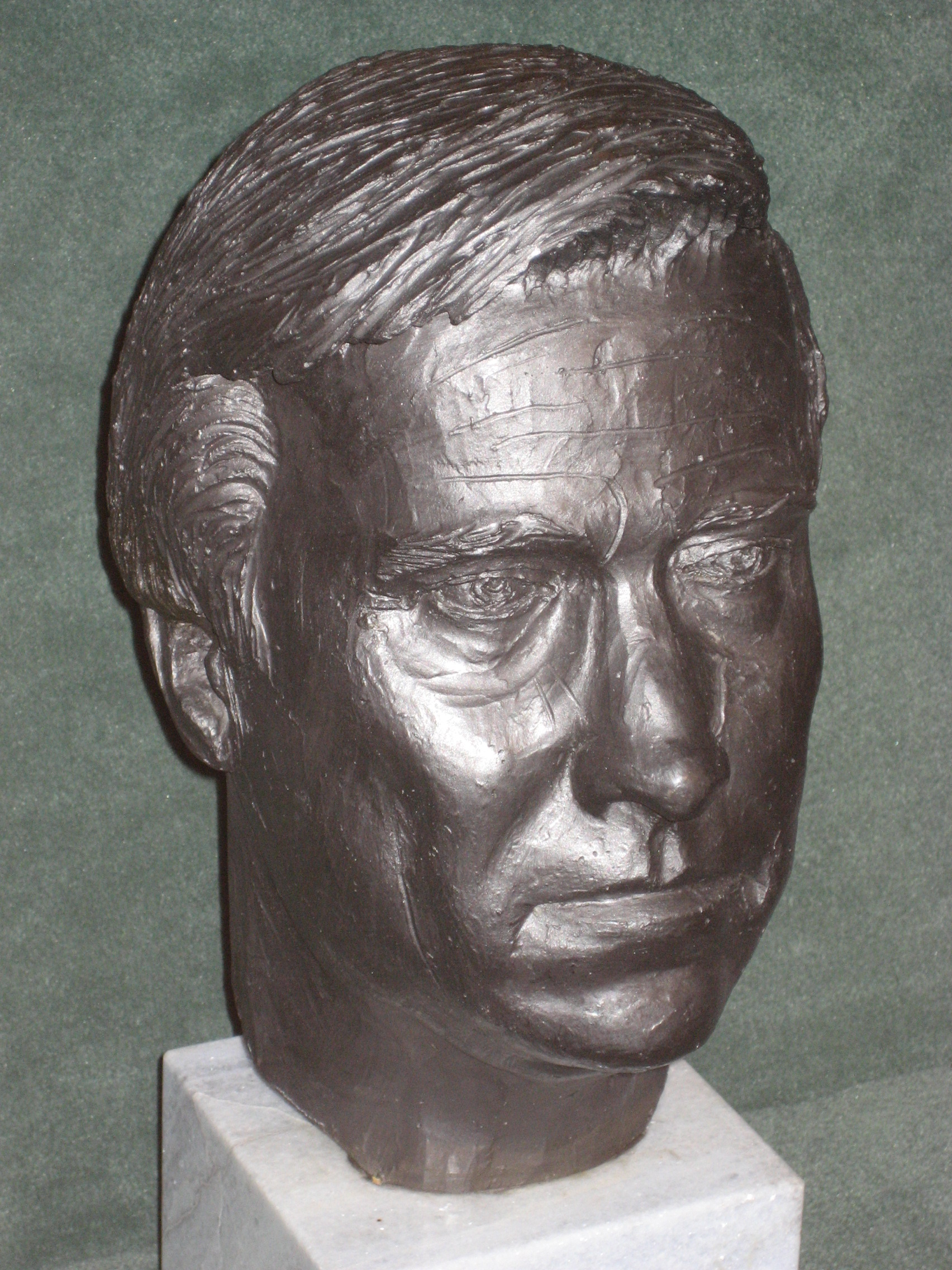
Ron Lancaster, Canadian Football Hall of Fame

- Éric Lapointe – player (RB), 2012 (Mount Allison University 1995–98).
- Ron Lancaster – player (QB), 1982 (Ottawa Rough Riders 1960–62; Saskatchewan Roughriders 1963–78, later as coach 1979–80; Edmonton Eskimos as coach 1991–97; Hamilton Tiger-Cats as coach 1998–2003, 2006).
- Ed Laverty – builder 2024
- Smirle Lawson – player (RB), 1963 (University of Toronto 1908–10; Toronto Argonauts 1911–14).
- Pep Leadley – player (RB/K), 1963 (Hamilton Tigers 1919–20, 1926–30; Queen's University 1921–25).
- Les Lear – player (OL/DL), 1974 (Winnipeg Blue Bombers 1938–41; Winnipeg RCAF Bombers 1942–43; Calgary Stampeders as player/coach 1948).
- Ken Lehmann – player (LB), 2011 (Ottawa Rough Riders 1964–71; BC Lions 1972).
- Marv Levy - builder, 2021 (Montreal Alouettes 1973-77 as coach), the second coach to be a member of both the Canadian Football Hall of Fame and the Pro Football Hall of Fame (NFL).
- Leo Lewis – player (RB), 1973 (Winnipeg Blue Bombers 1955–66).
- Nik Lewis – player (SB), 2021 (Calgary Stampeders 2004–2014; Montreal Alouettes 2015–2018).
- Moe Lieberman – builder, 1973 (University of Alberta as player 1915; Edmonton Eskimos as player 1921–22, manager 1922, director 1930s, and club organizer and director 1949–57).
- Don Loney – builder, 2013 (St. Francis Xavier University as coach 1957–73).
- Neil Lumsden – player (RB), 2014 (University of Ottawa 1972–75; Toronto Argonauts 1976–78; Hamilton Tiger-Cats 1978–79; Edmonton Eskimos 1980–85).
- Earl Lunsford – player (FB), 1983 (Calgary Stampeders 1956, 1959–63).
- Marv Luster – player (OE/DB), 1990 (Montreal Alouettes 1961–64, 1973–74; Toronto Argonauts 1964–72).
- Don Luzzi – player (OT/DT), 1985 (Calgary Stampeders 1958–69).

=== M ===
- Gene Makowsky – player (OT), 2015 (Saskatchewan Roughriders 1995–2011).
- Don Matthews – builder, 2011 (Edmonton Eskimos as assistant coach 1977–82; BC Lions as head coach 1983–87; Toronto Argonauts as head coach 1990, 1996–98, 2008; Saskatchewan Roughriders as head coach, 1991–93; Baltimore Stallions as head coach 1994–95; Edmonton Eskimos as head coach 1999–2000; Montreal Alouettes as head coach 2002–06).
- Harry McBrien – builder, 1978 (for officiating and rules committee; CRU executive 1951–1966; Grey Cup coordinator 1958–68).
- Jimmy McCaffrey – builder, 1967 (Ottawa Rough Riders as manager 1923–59; president IRFU and CRU).
- Paul McCallum – player (K/P), 2022 (BC Lions 1993/94, 2006–14, 2016; Ottawa Rough Riders 1993, Saskatchewan Roughriders 1994–2005, 2015).
- Dave McCann – builder, 1966 (Ottawa Rough Riders as player 1907–15, coach 1925–27; CRU president 1927, rules committee until 1958).
- Chester McCance – player (K/E), 1976 (Winnipeg Blue Bombers 1937–41, 1945; Winnipeg RCAF Bombers 1942–43; Montreal Alouettes 1946–50).
- Frank McCrystal – builder, 2025 (longtime Regina Rams coach)
- Don McDonald – builder, 2016 (administrator of minor football in Saskatchewan and the Saskatoon Hilltops).
- Frank McGill – player (QB), 1965 (McGill University 1910s; Montreal AAA Winged Wheelers 1910s–1920s).
- George McGowan – player (WR), 2003 (Edmonton Eskimos 1971–78).
- Danny McManus – player (QB), 2011 (Winnipeg Blue Bombers 1990–92; BC Lions 1993–95; Edmonton Eskimos 1996–97; Hamilton Tiger-Cats 1998–2005; Calgary Stampeders 2006).
- Donald McNaughton – builder, 1994 (coordinated the Schenley Awards, 1963–88).
- Don McPherson – builder, 1983 (Saskatchewan Roughriders as president 1956–57; BC Lions chaired the reorganization committee 1962).
- Ed McQuarters – player (DT), 1988 (Saskatchewan Roughriders 1966–74).
- John P. Metras – builder, 1980 (St. Michael's College (ORFU) as player 1933–34; University of Western Ontario as assistant coach 1935–38, head coach 1939–69, and other roles).
- Barron Miles – player (DB), 2018 (Montreal Alouettes 1998-2004; BC Lions 2005-2009).
- Rollie Miles – player (RB/DB/LB), 1980 (Edmonton Eskimos 1951–61).
- Sean Millington – player (RB), 2026 (Edmonton Eskimos 1991, 1999; BC Lions 1991–97, 2000–02; Winnipeg Blue Bombers 1998; Toronto Argonauts 2005).
- Jim Mills – player (OT), 2009 (BC Lions 1986–93/95; Ottawa Rough Riders 1994).
- Derrell Mitchell – player (WR), 2016 (Toronto Argonauts 1997–03; Edmonton Eskimos 2004–06; Toronto Argonauts 2007).
- Douglas Mitchell – builder, 2021 (CFL commissioner 1984–1988 (BC Lions as a player 1960).
- Percival Molson – player (RB/K), 1963 (McGill University 1898–1901; Montreal AAA Winged Wheelers 1902–06).
- Joe Montford – player (DE), 2011 (Shreveport Pirates 1995; Hamilton Tiger-Cats 1996–2001, 2003–04; Toronto Argonauts 2002; Edmonton Eskimos 2005–2006).
- Ken Montgomery – builder, 1970 (Edmonton Eskimos as president 1952–54; president CRU and WIFU).
- Warren Moon – player (QB), 2001 (Edmonton Eskimos 1978–83). As of 2026, the only player to be a member of both the Canadian Football Hall of Fame and the Pro Football Hall of Fame (NFL).
- Frank Morris – player (OG/DT), 1983 (HMCS York Navy 1942; HMCS Stadacona Navy 1943–44; Toronto Argonauts 1945–49; Edmonton Eskimos 1950–58).
- Teddy Morris – player, 1964 (Toronto Argonauts 1931–39, later as assistant coach 1940–41, head coach 1945–49; HMCS York Navy as coach 1942–44).
- Angelo Mosca – player (DT/OT/MG), 1987 (Hamilton Tiger-Cats 1958–59, 1962–72; Ottawa Rough Riders 1960–61; Montreal Alouettes 1962).
- Cal Murphy – builder, 2004 (BC Lions as assistant coach 1972–75, head coach 1975–76; Montreal Alouettes as assistant coach 1977; Edmonton Eskimos as assistant coach 1978–82; Winnipeg Blue Bombers as head coach, GM, 1983–96; Saskatchewan Roughriders as head coach 1999).
- James Murphy – player (WR), 2000 (Winnipeg Blue Bombers 1982–90).

=== N ===
- Don Narcisse – player (WR), 2010 (Saskatchewan Roughriders 1987–99).
- Roger Nelson – player (OT/DT/OG/OT), 1985 (Edmonton Eskimos 1954, 1956–67).
- Ray Nettles – player (LB), 2005 (BC Lions 1972–77; Toronto Argonauts 1977; Hamilton Tiger-Cats 1978; Ottawa Rough Riders 1979; Calgary Stampeders 1980).
- Peter Neumann – player (DE), 1979 (Hamilton Tiger-Cats 1951–64).
- Jack Newton – builder, 1964 (University of Toronto player/captain 1907–09; Toronto Argonauts player/coach 1912; Sarnia Imperials coach 1919–29).

=== O ===
- Bob O'Billovich – builder, 2015
- Red O'Quinn – player (E), 1981 (Montreal Alouettes 1952–59, later as general manager; Ottawa Rough Riders as general manager).
- Mike O'Shea – player (LB), 2017 (Toronto Argonauts 1996–99; Hamilton Tiger-Cats 2000; Toronto Argonauts 2001–08).
- Uzooma Okeke – player (OT), 2014 (Shreveport Pirates 1994–1995; Ottawa Rough Riders 1996; Montreal Alouettes 1997–2010).
- Jovan Olafioye – player (OL), 2025 (BC Lions 2010-2016, 2018; Montreal Alouettes 2017).
- Chad Owens – player (WR/KR), 2024 (Montreal Alouettes 2009; Toronto Argonauts 2010-2015; Hamilton Tiger-Cats 2016; Saskatchewan Roughriders 2017).

=== P ===
- Tony Pajaczkowski – player (DE/G), 1988 (Calgary Stampeders 1955–65; Montreal Alouettes 1966–67).
- Jackie Parker – player (QB/HB/WR/K/P), 1971 (Edmonton Eskimos 1954–62; Toronto Argonauts 1963–65; BC Lions 1968).
- James Parker – player (LB/DE), 2001 (Edmonton Eskimos 1980–83; BC Lions 1984–89; Toronto Argonauts 1990–91).
- Lui Passaglia – player (K/P), 2004 (BC Lions 1976–2000).

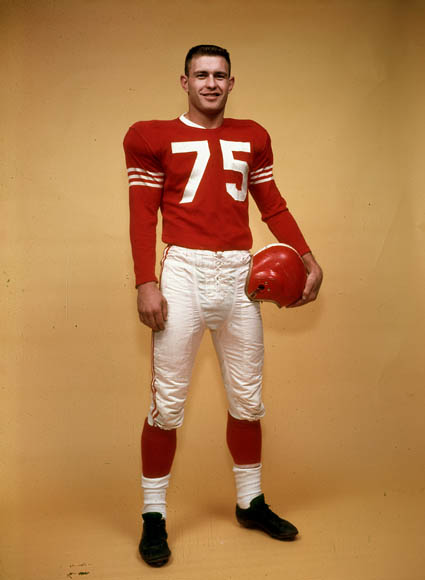
Hal Patterson

- Hal Patterson – player (OE/DB), 1971 (Montreal Alouettes 1954–60; Hamilton Tiger-Cats 1961–67).
- Elfrid Payton – player (DE), 2010 (Winnipeg Blue Bombers 1991–93, 2000, 2004; Shreveport Pirates 1994; Baltimore Stallions 1994–95; Montreal Alouettes 1996–99; Toronto Argonauts 2001; Edmonton Eskimos 2002–03).
- Gordon Perry – player (RB), 1970 (Montreal AAA Winged Wheelers 1928–34).
- Norm Perry – player (RB), 1963 (Sarnia Imperials 1928–35).
- Rudy Phillips – player (OG), 2009 (Ottawa Rough Riders 1981–84; Edmonton Eskimos 1986–87; Calgary Stampeders 1988).
- Joe Pistilli – builder, 2010 (Quebec Junior Football League as manager and other tasks 1967–2022).
- Allen Pitts – player (WR), 2006 (Calgary Stampeders 1990–2000).
- Ernie Pitts – player, 2019 (Winnipeg Blue Bombers 1957-69).
- Willie Pless – player (LB), 2005 (Toronto Argonauts1986–89; BC Lions 1990; Edmonton Eskimos 1991–98; Saskatchewan Roughriders 1999).
- Ken Ploen – player (QB/DB), 1975 (Winnipeg Blue Bombers 1957–67).
- Joe Poplawski – player (SB), 1998 (Winnipeg Blue Bombers 1978–86).
- Ken Preston – builder, 1990 (Queen's University as player 1936–39; Winnipeg Blue Bombers as player 1941–42; Ottawa Rough Riders as player 1945; Saskatchewan Roughriders as player 1940, 1943, player/coach 1946–48, and general manager 1958–78).
- Mike Pringle – player (RB), 2008 (Edmonton Eskimos 1992, 2003–04; Sacramento Gold Miners 1993; Baltimore Stallions 1994–95; Montreal Alouettes 1996–2002).

=== Q ===
- Silver Quilty – player (FW), 1966 (University of Ottawa 1907–1912; Ottawa Rough Riders 1913; McGill University 1914).

=== R ===
- Moe Racine – player (OT/K), 2014 (Ottawa Rough Riders 1958–74).
- Dave Raimey – player (RB/KR), 2000 (Winnipeg Blue Bombers 1965–68; Toronto Argonauts 1969–74).
- Ricky Ray – player (QB), 2022 (Edmonton Eskimos 2002–03, 2005–11; Toronto Argonauts 2012–18).
- Russ Rebholz – player (RB/QB), 1963 (Winnipeg St. John's 1932; Winnipeg Blue Bombers 1933–38).
- Larry Reda – builder, 2015
- George Reed – player (RB), 1979 (Saskatchewan Roughriders 1963–75).
- Ted Reeve – player, 1963 (Toronto Argonauts 1923; Toronto Balmy Beach Beachers 1924–30, later as coach 1945–46; Queen's University as coach 1933–38; Montreal Royals as coach 1939; Toronto Beaches Indians as coach, 1948).
- Dave Ridgway – player (K), 2003 (Saskatchewan Roughriders 1982–95).
- Frank Rigney – player (OT), 1984 (Winnipeg Blue Bombers 1958–67).
- Al Ritchie – builder, 1963 (Saskatchewan Roughriders as manager 1921–28 and coach 1930–32, 1935, 1942).
- Dave Ritchie – builder, 2022 (Montreal Concordes / Alouettes as assistant coach 1983–87, 1995, as head coach 1997–98; Winnipeg Blue Bombers as assistant coach 1990–91, as head coach 1999–2004; Ottawa Rough Riders as assistant coach 1992; BC Lions as head coach 1993–95, as assistant coach 2005–07).
- Charles Roberts – player (RB), 2014 (Winnipeg Blue Bombers 2001–08; BC Lions 2008).
- Larry Robinson – player (DB/K/R), 1998 (Calgary Stampeders 1961–75).
- Rocco Romano – player (OG), 2007 (Calgary Stampeders 1987, 1992–2000; Toronto Argonauts 1988; Ottawa Rough Riders 1989; BC Lions 1990–91).
- Mike Rodden – builder, 1964 (Queen's University as player 1910–13, coach 1916; McGill University as player 1914; Toronto Parkdale Canoe Club as player 1915, coach 1921–22; Toronto Argonauts as player 1919–20, coach 1920, 1926; Toronto Balmy Beach Beachers as coach 1924; Hamilton Tigers as coach 1927–30, 1937).
- Paul Rowe – player (RB), 1964 (Calgary Bronks 1938–40; Calgary Stampeders 1945–50).
- Martin Ruby – player (OT/DT), 1974 (Saskatchewan Roughriders 1951–57).
- Jeff Russel – player (RB), 1963 (Royal Military College of Canada 1917–20; McGill University 1920–22; Montreal AAA Winged Wheelers 1922–25).
- Joe Ryan – builder, 1968 (Winnipeg Blue Bombers as manager 1931–41).

=== S ===
- Ralph Sazio – builder, 1988 (Hamilton Tiger-Cats as player 1950–53, head coach 1963–67, general manager 1968–75, 1980, president 1973–77, vice-president of football operations 1978–80; Toronto Argonauts as president 1981–90).
- Stan Schwartz – builder, 2017 (Calgary Stampeders as assistant coach 1976–84, as president 1996–2004)
- Tom Scott – player (SB), 1998 (Winnipeg Blue Bombers 1974–77; Edmonton Eskimos 1978–83; Calgary Stampeders 1984).
- Vince Scott – player (DG), 1982 (Hamilton Wildcats 1949; Hamilton Tiger-Cats 1950, 1952–62).
- Dick Shatto – player (FB/HB/SB/F), 1975 (Toronto Argonauts 1954–65).
- Frank "Shag" Shaughnessy – builder, 1963 (McGill University as coach 1912–28).
- Tom Shepherd – builder, 2008 (Saskatchewan Roughriders as president 1966–present).
- Roy Shivers – builder, 2022 (BC Lions as assistant coach 1983–85, as personnel manager 1986–89, 2008–17, Calgary Stampeders as personnel manager 1990–94, 1996–99, Birmingham Barracudas as general manager 1995, Saskatchewan Roughriders as general manager 2000–06).
- Hap Shouldice – builder, 1977 (mostly for contributions to league rules and officiating including the CFL's first director of officiating in 1972).
- Geroy Simon – player (WR), 2017 (Winnipeg Blue Bombers 1999–2000, BC Lions 2001–2012, Saskatchewan Roughriders 2013)
- Ben Simpson – player (HB/K), 1963 (Queen's University 1899–1903; Hamilton Tigers 1904–10).
- Bob Simpson – player (FW/RB/DB), 1976 (Windsor Rockets 1949; Ottawa Rough Riders 1950–62).
- Jimmie Simpson – builder, 1985 (Hamilton Tigers as player 1928–38; Hamilton Flying Wildcats as player 1943–44; Hamilton Tiger-Cats as trainer 1953–74; also for officiating 1945–56).
- Karl Slocomb – builder, 1989 (Winnipeg Blue Bombers as executive 1940s–1950s, president 1953; later as president of WIFU 1956 and CRU 1960).
- Frank Smith – builder, 2019
- Larry Smith - builder, 2023
- Victor Spencer – builder, 2006 (Hamilton Tigers as player BC Lions as club organizer, director, and executive in the 1950s, serving other roles since then).
- David Sprague – player (RB/DT), 1963 (Hamilton Tigers 1930–32; Ottawa Rough Riders 1933–40).
- Harry Spring – builder, 1976 (Meraloma Club (BCRFU) as president 1937; BC Lions as treasurer 1955–56, vice-president 1957, and president 1958–59).
- Milt Stegall – player (SB), 2012 (Winnipeg Blue Bombers 1995–2008).
- Orlondo Steinauer – player (S), 2021 (Ottawa Rough Riders 1996; Hamilton Tiger-Cats 1997–2000; Toronto Argonauts 2001–2008).
- Art Stevenson – player (RB/QB/K), 1969 (Winnipeg Blue Bombers 1937–41).
- Ron Stewart – player (RB), 1977 (Queen's University 1953–57; Ottawa Rough Riders 1958–70).
- Bummer Stirling – player (K/RB), 1966 (Sarnia Imperials 1929–38).
- Annis Stukus – builder, 1974 (Toronto Argonauts as player 1935–41; Toronto Oakwood Indians as player/coach 1942; Toronto Balmy Beach Beachers as player 1943; HMCS York Navy Bulldogs as player 1944; Toronto Indians as player 1945–46; Edmonton Eskimos as player 1949–50, coach/general manager 1949–51; BC Lions as coach/general manager 1954–55).
- Don Sutherin – player (DB/K), 1992 (Hamilton Tiger-Cats 1958, 1960–66; Ottawa Rough Riders 1967–69; Toronto Argonauts 1970).
- Bill Symons – player (HB), 1997 (BC Lions 1966; Toronto Argonauts 1967–73).

=== T ===
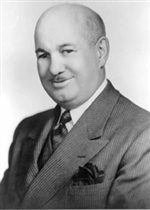
Piffles Taylor

- Piffles Taylor – builder, 1963. (University of Toronto as player pre-WWI; Regina Roughriders as player 1914–16, 1919–20, later as president 1934–36; Regina Boat Club as player 1920–21 and coach 1922–23; later president of WIFU and CRU).
- Dave Thelen – player (RB), 1989 (Ottawa Rough Riders 1958–64; Toronto Argonauts 1965–66).
- Dick Thornton – player (DB/KR), 2022 (Winnipeg Blue Bombers 1961–66; Toronto Argonauts 1967–72).
- Calvin Tiggle – player (LB), 2026 (Toronto Argonauts 1994–95, 2000–01; Hamilton Tiger-Cats 1996–99).
- Brian Timmis – player (OT), 1963 (Ottawa Seconds (QRFU) 1919; Regina Roughriders 1920–22; Ottawa Rough Riders 1923; Hamilton Tigers 1924–38).
- Tim Tindale – player (RB), 2022 (Western Mustangs 1990–1994).
- Frank Tindall – builder, 1984 (Toronto Argonauts as player 1933–34; Queen's University as coach 1939–75).
- Buddy Tinsley – player (OT/DT), 1982 (Winnipeg Blue Bombers 1950–60).
- Andy Tommy – player (FW/HB), 1989 (Ottawa Rough Riders 1933–41, 1946–47; Toronto Argonauts 1945).
- Brian Towriss – builder, 2017 (Saskatchewan Huskies as assistant coach 1980–83; as coach 1984–2016).
- Herb Trawick – player (OT), 1975 (Montreal Alouettes 1946–57).
- Joe Tubman – player (HB/K), 1968 (Ottawa Rough Riders 1919–31).
- Whit Tucker – player (HB/F), 1993 (University of Western Ontario 1960–61; Ottawa Rough Riders 1962–70).

=== U ===
- Ted Urness – player (G/T/C), 1989 (Saskatchewan Roughriders 1961–70).
- Larry Uteck – builder, 2020

=== V ===
- Kaye Vaughan – player (OG/OT/DT), 1978 (Ottawa Rough Riders 1953–64).
- Terry Vaughn – player (SB/WR), 2011 (Calgary Stampeders 1995–98; Edmonton Eskimos 1999–2004; Montreal Alouettes 2005; Hamilton Tiger-Cats 2006).
- Greg Vavra – player (QB), 2020 (Calgary Stampeders 1984-85; BC Lions 1986-87; Edmonton Elks 1988).
- Pierre Vercheval – player (OG), 2007 (Edmonton Eskimos 1988–92; Toronto Argonauts 1993–97; Montreal Alouettes 1998–2001).

=== W ===
- Virgil Wagner – player (RB/HB), 1980 (Montreal Alouettes 1946–54).
- Chris Walby – player (OT), 2003 (Montreal Alouettes 1981; Winnipeg Blue Bombers 1981–96).
- Mike Walker – player (DT), 2021 (Hamilton Tiger Cats 1982–1989; Edmonton Eskimos 1990–1991).
- Clair Warner – builder, 1965 (Saskatchewan Roughriders as player 1924–32, executive 1934–70, president 1941).
- Bert Warwick – builder, 1964 (Winnipeg St. John's as player; Winnipeg Blue Bombers as coach 1945, executive; later as executive of CRU/CFL).
- Glen Weir – player (DT), 2009 (Montreal Alouettes 1972–1981; Montreal Concordes 1982–84).
- Bob Wetenhall – builder, 2015
- Huck Welch – player (RB/K), 1964 (Hamilton Tigers 1928–29, 1935–37); Montreal AAA Winged Wheelers 1930–34).
- James West – player (LB), 2016 (Calgary Stampeders 1982–84; Winnipeg Blue Bombers 1985–92; BC Lions 1993).
- Tom Wilkinson – player (QB), 1987 (Toronto Argonauts 1967–70; BC Lions 1971; Edmonton Eskimos 1972–81).
- David Williams – player (WR), 2019 (BC Lions 1988–89; Ottawa Rough Riders 1990; Edmonton Eskimos 1991; Toronto Argonauts 1991–92; Winnipeg Blue Bombers 1993–95).
- Gizmo Williams – player (KR/WR), 2006 (Edmonton Eskimos 1986–2000).
- Al Wilson – player (OL), 1997 (BC Lions 1972–86).
- Don Wilson – player (DB), 2021 (Edmonton Eskimos 1987–1989, 1993–1994, 1998; Toronto Argonauts 1990–1992, 1995–1996; BC Lions 1997).
- Seymour Wilson – builder, 1984 (Hamilton Tigers as player 1930–37; officiating 1938–70).
- Earl Winfield – player (WR/KR), 2013 (Hamilton Tiger-Cats 1987–97).
- Harvey Wylie – player (DB/KR), 1980 (Calgary Stampeders 1956–64).

=== Y ===
- Dan Yochum – player (OT), 2004 (Montreal Alouettes 1972–1980; Edmonton Eskimos 1980).
- Jim Young – player (WR), 1991 (Queen's University 1961–63; BC Lions 1967–79).

=== Z ===
- Ben Zambiasi – player (LB), 2004 (Hamilton Tiger-Cats 1978–87; Toronto Argonauts 1988).
- Bill Zock – player (G/T), 1984 (Toronto Argonauts 1937–41; Toronto Balmy Beach Beachers 1942–44; Edmonton Eskimos 1951–54).

== Football reporters of Canada ==
In addition to builders of the sport, and players, the Hall of Fame also has a section dedicated towards broadcasters and reporters of the sport.

=== Inductees ===
- Ernie Afaganis, 1988
- Tony Allen, 1981
- Perc Allen, 1991
- Ralph Allen, 1990
- Jeff Avery, 2017
- John Badham, 1995
- Mike Beamish, 2014
- Eric Bishop, 1987
- Bob Bratina, 1998
- Rheaume Brisebois, 1982
- Stephen Brunt, 2007
- Ernie Calcutt, 2017
- Dink Carroll, 1986
- Tom Casey, 2004
- Don Chevrier, 2016
- Rick Cluff, 1999
- Cam Cole, 2002
- Jim Coleman, 1980
- Jim Cox, 1997
- Gordon Craig, 1996
- Chris Cuthbert, 2014
- Steve Daniel, 2024
- Darrell Davis, 2006
- Vern DeGeer, 1981
- Dave Dryburgh, 1981
- Pierre Dufault, 2001
- Milt Dunnell, 1986
- Johnny Esaw, 1984
- Trent Frayne, 1987
- Bob Frewin, 1990
- Paul Friesen, 2025
- Kent Gilchrist, 2005
- Bill Good, Sr., 1982
- Paul Graham, 2018
- Bryan Hall, 1989
- Vicki Hall, 2023
- Bob Hanley, 1992
- Bob Hooper, 2021
- Bob Hughes, 1990
- Jim Hunt, 1987
- Gorde Hunter, 1983
- Jon Hynes, 2023
- Bob Irving, 1997
- Dale Isaac, 2003
- Mal Isaac, 2003
- Terry Jones, 2002
- Jim Kearney, 1993
- Graham Kelly, 2002
- George Kent, 1988
- Terry Kielty, 1991
- Farhan Lalji, 2024
- Eddie MacCabe, 1985
- Al Maki, 2006
- Pat Marsden, 1989
- Norm Marshall, 1989
- Peter Martin, 2000
- Jack Matheson, 1986
- Rick Matsumoto, 1994
- Al McCann, 1993
- J. P. McConnell, 1996
- Wes McKnight, 1985
- Paul McLean, 2009
- Tom Melville, 1988
- Ivan Miller, 1979
- Steve Milton, 2012
- Bob Moir, 1985
- Dave Naylor, 2015
- Ken Newans, 1991
- Andy O'Brien, 1980
- Basil O'Meara, 1979
- Judy Owen, 2025
- Bernie Pascall, 2021
- Joe Pascucci, 2015
- Hal Pawson, 1983
- Bob Picken, 1992
- Jim Proudfoot, 1992
- Tony Proudfoot, 2008
- Pierre Proulx, 1985
- Gillis Purcell, 1987
- Dan Ralph, 2012
- Ted Reeve, 1979
- Al Ruckaber, 2005
- Lloyd Saunders, 1986
- Chris Schultz, 2023
- Bill Selnes, 2013
- Fred Sgambati, 1989
- Hal Sigurdson, 1994
- Steve Simmons, 2019
- Doug Smith, 1983
- Maurice Smith, 1982
- Mark Stephen, 2013
- Bill Stephenson, 1988
- Annis Stukus, 1980
- Glen Suitor, 2022
- Jack Sullivan, 1994
- Erwin Swangard, 1984
- Ed Tait, 2011
- Jim Taylor, 1989
- Larry Tucker, 2019
- Lowell Ullrich, 2014
- Henry Viney, 1980
- Gord Walker, 1982
- Hal Walker, 1979
- Jack Wells, 1981
- John Wells, 1995
- Bill Westwick, 1984
- Ed Willes, 2022
- Brian Williams, 2010
- Don Wittman, 1990
- Herb Zurkowsky, 2008

== Hall of Fame Game ==
Season	Date	Road team	Score	Home team	Score		Television
2003	September 14	Winnipeg	19	Calgary	21		TSN
2004	October 1	Edmonton	27	Hamilton	30		TSN
2005	September 30	Edmonton	14	Hamilton	40		TSN
2006	September 30	BC	28	Hamilton	8		TSN
2007	September 15	Winnipeg	34	Hamilton	4		TSN
2008	September 19	Winnipeg	25	Hamilton	23		TSN
2009	September 26	Toronto	24	Winnipeg	29		TSN
2010	August 12	BC	13	Saskatchewan	37		TSN
2011	September 17	BC	32	Calgary	19		TSN
2012	November 3	Montreal	11	Winnipeg	19		TSN
2013	October 5	Montreal	47	Edmonton	24		TSN/RDS/ESPN3
2014	September 21	Calgary	15	Montreal	31		TSN/RDS/ESPN2
2015	August 22	Calgary	34	Saskatchewan	31		TSN
2016	September 16	Montreal	17	Hamilton	20		TSN/RDS
2017	September 15	Saskatchewan	27	Hamilton	19		TSN/RDS
2018	September 15	Calgary	43	Hamilton	28		TSN/RDS
2019	August 10	BC	34	Hamilton	35		TSN/RDS
2020 & 2021	June 18, 2022	Calgary	33	Hamilton	30	OT	TSN
2022	September 17	Winnipeg	31	Hamilton	48		TSN/RDS
2023	September 16	Winnipeg	23	Hamilton	29		TSN
2024	September 14	Ottawa	21	Hamilton	37		CTV/RDS2
2025	September 20	Edmonton	27	Hamilton	29		TSN/RDS2

== See also ==
- TSN Top 50 CFL Players
- List of attractions in Hamilton, Ontario
- List of Pro Football Hall of Fame inductees
