= 1938 Ottawa Rough Riders season =

Canadian football team season

- Head coach: Ross Trimble
- Home stadium: Lansdowne Park

Results
- Record: 5–1
- League place: 1st, IRFU
- Playoffs: Lost in IRFU Finals

The 1938 Ottawa Rough Riders finished in first place in the Interprovincial Rugby Football Union with a 5–1 record, but lost in the IRFU Finals to the Toronto Argonauts.

== Regular season ==
=== Standings ===
Interprovincial Rugby Football Union
Team	GP	W	L	T	PF	PA	Pts
Ottawa Rough Riders	6	5	1	0	141	41	10
Toronto Argonauts	6	5	1	0	151	52	10
Hamilton Tigers	6	2	4	0	61	122	4
Montreal Cubs	6	0	6	0	30	168	4

=== Schedule ===
Week	Date	Opponent	Results	
Week	Date	Opponent	Score	Record
1	Oct 8	vs. Montreal Cubs	W 37–0	1–0
2	Oct 15	at Hamilton Tigers	W 42–6	2–0
3	Oct 22	at Toronto Argonauts	L 6–10	2–1
4	Oct 29	vs. Toronto Argonauts	W 15–13	3–1
5	Nov 5	vs. Hamilton Tigers	W 23–9	4–1
6	Nov 12	at Montreal Cubs	W 18–3	5–1

== Postseason ==
Round	Date	Opponent	Results	
Round	Date	Opponent	Score	Record
IRFU Final #1	Nov 19	at Toronto Argonauts	L 1–9	5–2
IRFU Final #2	Nov 26	vs. Toronto Argonauts	L 3–5	5–3
