= Tommy Burns (Canadian football) =

Canadian football player (1910–1942)

Profile
- Positions: Flying Wing, Tackle

Personal information
- Born: July 9, 1910; Montreal, Quebec, Canada
- Died: April 4, 1942 (aged 31); Liverpool, Nova Scotia, Canada
- Listed weight: 204 lb (93 kg)

Career information
- College: none - Montreal C.N.R. Juniors

Career history
- 1931–32: Montreal AAA Winged Wheelers
- 1932–35: Toronto Argonauts
- 1936–37: Montreal Indians
- 1938: Montreal Nationals
- 1939: Montreal Westmounts
- 1940–41: Montreal Bulldogs

Awards and highlights
- 2× Grey Cup champion (1931, 1933); 4× CFL East All-Star (1934, 37, 38, 39)

Tommy Burns (July 9, 1910 – April 4, 1942) was a Canadian football player. He was an all-star and Grey Cup champion in the Interprovincial Rugby Football Union and the Ontario Rugby Football Union, playing from 1931 to 1941.

A hometown boy, coming from the Montreal C.N.R. Juniors, Burns won a Grey Cup with the Montreal AAA Winged Wheelers in 1931, his rookie season. He left home for a four-year stay with the Toronto Argonauts, where he won another Cup in 1933 and was selected an all-star in 1934. He then returned to Montreal and played with nearly every team the city had to offer. In the 1936 and 1937 seasons, he played for the Montreal Indians, but in 1938 he left the IRFU for the ORFU and the Montreal Nationals and, in 1939, the Montreal Westmounts. He finished with two seasons playing for the Montreal Bulldogs. He was an all-star in 1937, 1938 and 1939.

Burns suffered a fatal accident on April 4, 1942. While working in Nova Scotia for Montreal firm J. P. Porter & Sons, the brake drum of a dredge he was working upon came apart, instantly killing him.
