= 1940 Ottawa Rough Riders season =

Canadian football team season

- Head coach: Ross Trimble
- Home stadium: Lansdowne Park

Results
- Record: 5–1
- Division place: 1st, IRFU
- Playoffs: Won Grey Cup

The 1940 Ottawa Rough Riders finished in first place in the Interprovincial Rugby Football Union with a 5–1 record and won the Grey Cup.

== Regular season ==
=== Standings ===
Interprovincial Rugby Football Union
Team	GP	W	L	T	PF	PA	Pts
Ottawa Rough Riders	6	5	1	0	116	40	10
Toronto Argonauts	6	4	2	0	58	79	8
Hamilton Tigers	6	2	4	0	45	73	4
Montreal Royals	6	1	5	0	39	66	2

=== Schedule ===
Week	Date	Opponent	Results	
Week	Date	Opponent	Score	Record
1	Oct 5	at Hamilton Tigers	W 21–1	1–0
2	Oct 12	vs. Montreal Royals	W 19–0	2–0
3	Oct 19	vs. Toronto Argonauts	W 41–6	3–0
4	Oct 26	at Toronto Argonauts	L 9–11	3–1
5	Nov 2	at Montreal Royals	W 7–4	4–1
6	Nov 9	vs. Hamilton Tigers	W 19–18	5–1

== Postseason ==
Round	Date	Opponent	Results	
Round	Date	Opponent	Score	Record
IRFU Final #1	Nov 16	vs. Toronto Argonauts	W 12–1	6–1
IRFU Final #2	Nov 23	at Toronto Argonauts	W 8–1	7–1
Grey Cup Game 1	Nov 30	at Toronto Balmy Beach	W 8–2	8–1
Grey Cup Game 2	Dec 7	vs. Toronto Balmy Beach	W 12–5	9–1
