= 1938 Toronto Argonauts season =

CFL team season

- Head coach: Lew Hayman
- Home stadium: Varsity Stadium

Results
- Record: 5–1
- Division place: 2nd, IRFU
- Playoffs: Won Grey Cup

The 1938 Toronto Argonauts season was the 52nd season for the team since the franchise's inception in 1873. The team finished in second place in the Interprovincial Rugby Football Union with a 5–1 record and qualified for the playoffs for the third consecutive season. The Argonauts defeated the Ottawa Rough Riders in a two-game total-points IRFU Final series before winning the Eastern Final over the Sarnia Imperials. The defending champion Argonauts defeated the Winnipeg Blue Bombers in the 26th Grey Cup game by a score of 30–7, winning the franchise's fifth Grey Cup championship. It was also the first time that the Argonauts had repeated as champions as this was a rematch of the previous year's Grey Cup game.

== Preseason ==
Game	Date	Opponent	Results		Venue	Attendance
Game	Date	Opponent	Score	Record	Venue	Attendance
A	Sat, Sept 24	vs. Toronto Balmy Beach	L 2–7	0–1	Varsity Stadium	10,000

== Regular season ==
=== Standings ===
Interprovincial Rugby Football Union
Team	GP	W	L	T	PF	PA	Pts
Ottawa Rough Riders	6	5	1	0	141	41	10
Toronto Argonauts	6	5	1	0	151	52	10
Hamilton Tigers	6	2	4	0	61	122	4
Montreal Cubs	6	0	6	0	30	168	0

=== Schedule ===
Week	Game	Date	Opponent	Results	
Week	Game	Date	Opponent	Score	Record
1	1	Sat, Oct 8	vs. Hamilton Tigers	W 21–8	1–0
2	2	Sat, Oct 15	at Montreal Cubs	W 25–2	2–0
3	3	Sat, Oct 22	vs. Ottawa Rough Riders	W 10–6	3–0
4	4	Sat, Oct 29	at Ottawa Rough Riders	L 13–15	3–1
5	5	Sun, Nov 6	vs. Montreal Cubs	W 58–13	4–1
6	6	Sun, Nov 13	at Hamilton Tigers	W 24–8	5–1

== Postseason ==
Round	Date	Opponent	Results		Venue
Round	Date	Opponent	Score	Record	Venue
IRFU Final Game 1	Sat, Nov 19	vs. Ottawa Rough Riders	W 9–1	1–0	Varsity Stadium
IRFU Final Game 2	Sat, Nov 26	at Ottawa Rough Riders	W 5–3	2–0	Lansdowne Park
Eastern Final	Sat, Dec 3	vs. Sarnia Imperials	W 25–8	3–0	Varsity Stadium
Grey Cup	Sat, Dec 10	vs. Winnipeg Blue Bombers	W 30–7	4–0	Varsity Stadium

=== Grey Cup ===
December 10 @ Varsity Stadium (Attendance: 18,778)

Team	Q1	Q2	Q3	Q4	Total
Winnipeg Blue Bombers	4	3	0	0	7
Toronto Argonauts	0	5	1	24	30
