= 1941 Ottawa Rough Riders season =

Canadian football team season

- Head coach: Ross Trimble
- Home stadium: Lansdowne Park

Results
- Record: 5–1
- Division place: 1st, ECU
- Playoffs: Lost Grey Cup

The 1941 Ottawa Rough Riders finished in first place in the Interprovincial Rugby Football Union with a 5–1 record, but failed to defend as Grey Cup champions as the team lost the 29th Grey Cup to the Winnipeg Blue Bombers.

== Regular season ==
=== Standings ===
Interprovincial Rugby Football Union
| Team | GP | W | L | T | PF | PA | Pts |
|---|---|---|---|---|---|---|---|
| Ottawa Rough Riders | 6 | 5 | 1 | 0 | 72 | 21 | 10 |
| Toronto Argonauts | 6 | 5 | 1 | 0 | 66 | 42 | 10 |
| Toronto Balmy Beach Beachers | 6 | 2 | 4 | 0 | 27 | 34 | 4 |
| Montreal Royals | 6 | 0 | 6 | 0 | 12 | 80 | 0 |

=== Schedule ===
| Week | Date | Opponent | Results | |
| Week | Date | Opponent | Score | Record |
|---|---|---|---|---|
| 1 | Sept 27 | vs. Montreal Royals | W 18–5 | 1–0 |
| 2 | Oct 4 | at Toronto Argonauts | L 3–7 | 1–1 |
| 3 | Oct 11 | vs. Toronto Balmy Beach Beachers | W 13–1 | 2–1 |
| 4 | Oct 18 | at Toronto Balmy Beach Beachers | W 3–0 | 3–1 |
| 5 | Oct 25 | vs. Toronto Argonauts | W 24–6 | 4–1 |
| 6 | Nov 1 | at Montreal Royals | W 11–2 | 5–1 |

== Postseason ==
| Round | Date | Opponent | Results | |
| Round | Date | Opponent | Score | Record |
|---|---|---|---|---|
| IRFU Final #1 | Nov 8 | vs. Toronto Argonauts | W 16–8 | 6–1 |
| IRFU Final #2 | Nov 15 | at Toronto Argonauts | W 10–1 | 7–1 |
| Eastern Final | Nov 22 | vs. Hamilton Wildcats | W 7–2 | 8–1 |
| Grey Cup | Nov 29 | Winnipeg Blue Bombers | L 16–18 | 8–2 |
