= Bill Davies (Canadian football) =

Canadian football player

Profile
- Positions: Fullback, Flying Wing, Tackle

Personal information
- Born: January 25, 1916; Montreal, Quebec, Canada
- Died: May 28, 1990 (aged 74)

Career information
- College: none - Montreal Catholic High School

Career history
- 1936–37: Montreal Indians
- 1938: Montreal Nationals
- 1939: Montreal Royals
- 1940–41: Montreal Bulldogs
- 1943: Verdun Grads
- 1945: Montreal Hornets
- 1946: Montreal Alouettes

Awards and highlights
- CFL All-Star (1939); Jeff Russel Memorial Trophy (1939)

Bill Davies (January 25, 1916 – May 28, 1990) was an all-star football player in the Ontario Rugby Football Union and the Interprovincial Rugby Football Union, playing from 1936 to 1946.

Coming straight from high school in 1936, Davies first suited up for the Montreal Indians. He ended up playing for nearly every team in his hometown: Montreal Nationals, Montreal Royals, Montreal Bulldogs, Verdun Grads and the Montreal Hornets.

Davies best season was with the winless Montreal Royals in 1939. As one of the league's "brightest stars" and "outstanding as a secondary defenseman", he won the Jeff Russel Memorial Trophy as the best player in the IRFU. He concluded his career in 1946, playing four games as one of the inaugural Montreal Alouettes.

Davies later took up coaching, leading the Lakeshore Junior Alouettes from 1952 to 1957, winning six straight Quebec Junior championships and a national championship in 1953. He died May 28, 1990.
