= 1938 in Canadian football =

For the second consecutive season the Toronto Argonauts and Winnipeg Blue Bombers met for the Grey Cup. The Argonauts won the game.

== Canadian football news in 1938 ==
The Edmonton Eskimos joined the WIFU and adopted the colours of blue and white. They would withdraw from the union in 1940.

== Regular season ==
=== Final regular season standings ===
Note: GP = Games played, W = Wins, L = Losses, T = Ties, PF = Points for, PA = Points against, Pts = points

Western Interprovincial Football Union
Team	GP	W	L	T	PF	PA	Pts
**Calgary Bronks**	8	6	2	0	50	27	12
**Winnipeg Blue Bombers**	8	6	2	0	114	63	12
**Regina Roughriders**	8	4	4	0	69	55	8
Edmonton Eskimos	8	0	8	0	29	117	0

Interprovincial Rugby Football Union
Team	GP	W	L	T	PF	PA	Pts
**Ottawa Rough Riders**	6	5	1	0	141	41	10
**Toronto Argonauts**	6	5	1	0	151	52	10
Hamilton Tigers	6	2	4	0	61	122	4
Montreal Cubs	6	0	6	0	30	168	0

Ontario Rugby Football Union
Team	GP	W	L	T	PF	PA	Pts
**Sarnia Imperials**	6	3	1	2	95	27	8
**Montreal Nationals**	6	3	1	2	77	42	8
Toronto Balmy Beach	6	3	3	0	73	33	6
Peterborough Orfuns	6	1	5	0	15	158	2

*Bold text means that they had clinched the playoffs.

British Columbia Rugby Football Union
Team	GP	W	L	T	PF	PA	Pts
**North Shore Lions**	8	7	1	0	110	24	15
University of British Columbia Thunderbirds	6	5	1	0	57	18	15
Knights of Columbus	8	3	5	0	43	56	6
Vancouver Meralomas	8	0	8	0	3	115	0

*UBC games are worth 3 points in the standings.

== Grey Cup playoffs ==
Note: All dates in 1938

=== Semifinals ===
WIFU semifinals
Date	Away	Home
October 29	Regina Roughriders 0	Winnipeg Blue Bombers 13

ORFU finals
Game	Date	Away	Home
1	November 19	Sarnia Imperials 9	Montreal Nationals 5
2	November 26	Sarnia Imperials 15	Montreal Nationals 0

- Sarnia won the total-point series by 24–5. Sarnia would play the Toronto Argonauts (IRFU Champions) in the Eastern finals.

IRFU finals
Game	Date	Away	Home
1	November 19	Toronto Argonauts 9	Ottawa Rough Riders 1
2	November 26	Toronto Argonauts 5	Ottawa Rough Riders 3

- Toronto won the total-point series by 14–4. Toronto would play the Sarnia Imperials (ORFU Champions) in the Eastern Finals.

=== Finals ===
Western finals
Game	Date	Away	Home
1	November 5	Winnipeg Blue Bombers 12	Calgary Bronks 7
2	November 12	Calgary Bronks 2	Winnipeg Blue Bombers 13

- Winnipeg won the total-point series by 25–9. Winnipeg advanced to the Grey Cup game.

Eastern finals
Date	Away	Home
December 3?	Toronto Argonauts 25	Sarnia Imperials (ORFU) 8

- Toronto advanced to the Grey Cup game.

== Playoff bracket ==
Quarterfinals
IRFU	Toronto Argonauts	9-5
IRFU	Ottawa Rough Riders	1-3
EAST
ORFU	Sarnia Imperials	9-15
ORFU	Montreal Nationals	5-0
WIFU	Calgary Bronks
WIFU	BYE
WEST
WIFU	Winnipeg Blue Bombers	13
WIFU	Regina Roughriders	0

Semifinals
IRFU	Toronto Argonauts	25
ORFU	Sarnia Imperials	8
WIFU	Calgary Bronks	7-2
WIFU	Winnipeg Blue Bombers	12-13

Grey Cup final
IRFU	Toronto Argonauts	30
WIFU	Winnipeg Blue Bombers	7

== Grey Cup Championship ==
December 10 26th Annual Grey Cup Game: Varsity Stadium – Toronto, Ontario
WIFU Champion	IRFU Champion
Winnipeg Blue Bombers 7	Toronto Argonauts 30
The Toronto Argonauts were the 1938 Grey Cup Champions.

- Note: Eastern Final Playoff date is not confirmed; however, since the regular season in the East ended November 12, and all other playoff dates, as well as Grey Cup date are accurate, it is reasonable to assume the above date is accurate.

== 1938 Eastern (combined IRFU & ORFU) All-Stars selected by Canadian Press ==
Note: During this time, most players played both ways, so the All-Star selections do not distinguish between some offensive and defensive positions.

=== 1st Team ===
- QB – Annis Stukus, Toronto Argonauts
- FW – Ted Morris, Toronto Argonauts
- HB – Johnny Ferraro, Montreal Nationals
- HB – Hugh Sterling, Sarnia Imperials
- HB – Art West, Toronto Argonauts
- E – Wes Cutler, Toronto Argonauts
- E – Bernie Thompson, Toronto Argonauts
- C – George Willis, University of Western Ontario
- G – Charles "Tiny" Hermann, Ottawa Rough Riders
- G – Bob Reid, Toronto Balmy Beach Beachers
- T – Dave Sprague, Ottawa Rough Riders
- T – Mike Clawson, Sarnia Imperials

=== 2nd Team ===
- QB – Ab Box, Toronto Balmy Beach Beachers
- FW – Ernie Hempey, Montreal Nationals
- HB – Murray Griffin, Ottawa Rough Riders
- HB – Herb Westman, McGill University
- HB – Bob Isbister, Toronto Argonauts
- E – Tony McCarthy, Ottawa Rough Riders
- E – Syd Reynolds, Toronto Balmy Beach Beachers
- C – Joseph "Curley" Moynahan, Ottawa Rough Riders
- G – Alex Fleming, Montreal Nationals
- G – George Fraser, Ottawa Rough Riders
- T – Tommy Burns, Montreal Indians
- T – Bunny Wadsworth, Ottawa Rough Riders

== 1938 Ontario Rugby Football Union All-Stars ==
Note: During this time, most players played both ways, so the All-Star selections do not distinguish between some offensive and defensive positions.

- QB – Ab Box, Toronto Balmy Beach Beachers
- FW – Ernie Hempey, Montreal Nationals
- HB – Johnny Ferraro, Montreal Nationals
- HB – Eddie Thompson, Toronto Balmy Beach Beachers
- DB – Hugh Sterling, Sarnia Imperials
- E – Syd Reynolds, Toronto Balmy Beach Beachers
- E – Eddie Burton, Montreal Nationals
- C – Dave Ryan, Montreal Nationals
- G – Bob Reid, Toronto Balmy Beach Beachers
- G – Alex Fleming, Montreal Nationals
- T – Mike Clawson, Sarnia Imperials
- T – Tommy Burns, Montreal Nationals

== 1938 Canadian football awards ==
- Jeff Russel Memorial Trophy (IRFU MVP) – Wes Cutler (DE), Toronto Argonauts
- Imperial Oil Trophy (ORFU MVP) - John Ferraro - Montreal Nationals
