= Martin Platz =

Profile
- Position: End

Career history
- 1939–1940: Winnipeg Blue Bombers

Awards and highlights
- Grey Cup champion (1939)

Martin J. Platz was a Canadian professional football player who played for the Winnipeg Blue Bombers. He won the Grey Cup with them in 1939.

He was the son of Leo Platz, had brothers Waldemar and Paul, and sisters Margaret, Helen and Ruth. He served in World War II with the Royal Canadian Air Force. In August 1941, he was reported as being held as a prisoner of war, having been missing since July 7, 1941. In 1947, he was living in Hamilton, Ontario.
