= 1939 in Canadian football =

The Winnipeg Blue Bombers played in their third consecutive Grey Cup final. A last-second rouge gave Winnipeg its second title in five years.

== Regular season, final standings ==
Column headings: GP = Games played, W = Wins, L = Losses, T = Ties, PF = Points for, PA = Points against, Pts = Points

**Western Interprovincial Football Union**
Team	GP	W	L	T	PF	PA	Pts
**Winnipeg Blue Bombers**	12	10	2	0	201	103	20
**Regina Roughriders**	12	6	6	0	84	136	12
**Calgary Bronks**	11	4	7	0	144	123	8
Edmonton Eskimos	11	3	8	0	80	147	6

**Interprovincial Rugby Football Union**
Team	GP	W	L	T	PF	PA	Pts
**Ottawa Rough Riders**	6	5	1	0	145	44	10
**Toronto Argonauts**	6	4	1	1	58	43	9
Hamilton Tigers	6	2	4	0	29	84	4
Montreal Royals	6	0	5	1	23	84	1

Ontario Rugby Football Union
Team	GP	W	L	T	PF	PA	Pts
**Montreal Westmounts**	6	4	1	1	71	45	9
**Sarnia Imperials**	6	3	1	2	70	38	8
Toronto Balmy Beach	6	3	2	1	58	27	7
Peterborough Orfuns	6	0	6	0	16	105	0

- Bold text means that they have clinched the playoffs

British Columbia Rugby Football Union
Team	GP	W	L	T	PF	PA	Pts
**University of British Columbia Thunderbirds**	6	6	0	0	108	25	12
Knights of Columbus	6	4	2	0	63	63	8
North Shore Lions	6	2	4	0	48	51	4
Victoria Revellers	6	0	6	0	25	105	0

== BCRFU playoffs ==
Note: All dates in 1939

=== BCRFU semifinals ===
Date	Away	Home
November 18	North Shore Lions 0	University of British Columbia Thunderbirds 12

University of British Columbia Thunderbirds advance to BCRFU finals

Date	Away	Home
November 18	Knights of Columbus 1	Victoria Revellers 6

Victoria Revellers advance to BCRFU finals

=== BCRFU final ===
Date	Away	Home
November 25	Victoria Revellers 6	University of British Columbia Thunderbirds 17

University of British Columbia Thunderbirds win the BCRFU championship

== Grey Cup playoffs ==
Note: All dates in 1939

=== Semifinals ===
WIFU Semifinals
Calgary Bronks @ Regina Roughriders
Probable date	Away	Home
November 4	Calgary Bronks 24	Regina Roughriders 17

ORFU Finals
Game	Date	Away	Home
1	November 18	Montreal Westmounts 1	Sarnia Imperials 13
2	November 25	Sarnia Imperials 18	Montreal Westmounts 13

- Sarnia won the total-point series by 31–14 and played the Ottawa Rough Riders (IRFU Champions) in the Eastern Finals.

IRFU Finals
Game	Date	Away	Home
1	November 18	Ottawa Rough Riders 11	Toronto Argonauts 0
2	November 25	Ottawa Rough Riders 28	Toronto Argonauts 6

- Ottawa won the total-point series by 39–6 and played the Sarnia Imperials (ORFU Champions) in the Eastern Finals.

=== Finals ===
Western Finals
Game	Date	Away	Home
1	November 11	Calgary Bronks 13	Winnipeg Blue Bombers 7
2	November 18	Winnipeg Blue Bombers 28	Calgary Bronks 7

- Winnipeg won the total-point series by 35–20 and advanced to the Grey Cup game.

Eastern Finals
Ottawa Rough Riders (IRFU) @ Sarnia Imperials (ORFU)
Date	Away	Home
December 2	Ottawa Rough Riders 23	Sarnia Imperials (ORFU) 1

- Ottawa advanced to the Grey Cup game.

== Playoff bracket ==
Quarterfinals
IRFU	Ottawa Rough Riders	11-28
IRFU	Toronto Argonauts	0-6
EAST
ORFU	Montreal Westmounts	1-13
ORFU	Sarnia Imperials	12-18
WIFU	Winnipeg Blue Bombers
WIFU	BYE
WEST
WIFU	Regina Roughriders	17
WIFU	Calgary Bronks	24

Semifinals
IRFU	Ottawa Rough Riders	23
ORFU	Sarnia Imperials	1
WIFU	Winnipeg Blue Bombers	7+28
WIFU	Calgary Bronks	13+7

Grey Cup final
IRFU	Ottawa Rough Riders	7
WIFU	Winnipeg Blue Bombers	8

== Grey Cup Championship ==
December 9 27th Annual Grey Cup Game: Lansdowne Park – Ottawa, Ontario
WIFU Champion	IRFU Champion
Winnipeg Blue Bombers 8	Ottawa Rough Riders 7
The Winnipeg Blue Bombers became the 1939 Grey Cup Champions

== 1939 Interprovincial Rugby Football Union All-Stars ==
NOTE: During this time most players played both ways, so the All-Star selections do not distinguish between some offensive and defensive positions.

- QB – Bill Stukus, Toronto Argonauts
- FW – Bill Davies, Montreal Royals
- HB – Red Storey, Toronto Argonauts
- HB – Bill Isbister, Hamilton Tigers
- FB – Tony Golab, Ottawa Rough Riders
- E – Tony McCarthy, Ottawa Rough Riders
- E – Bernie Thornton, Toronto Argonauts
- C – George Willis, Toronto Argonauts
- G – Charles "Tiny" Hermann, Ottawa Rough Riders
- G – Len Staughton, Ottawa Rough Riders
- T – Bunny Wadsworth, Ottawa Rough Riders
- T – Dave Sprague, Ottawa Rough Riders

== 1939 Ontario Rugby Football Union All-Stars ==
NOTE: During this time most players played both ways, so the All-Star selections do not distinguish between some offensive and defensive positions.

- QB – Clayton "Curly" Krug, Peterborough Orfuns
- FW – Joe Woodcock, Sarnia Imperials
- HB – Bernie Moroz, Sarnia Imperials
- HB – Eddie Thompson, Toronto Balmy Beach Beachers
- DB – Johnny Ferraro, Montreal Westmounts
- E – Ike Norris, Sarnia Imperials
- E – Leo Deadey, Peterborough Orfuns
- C – Harry Living, Sarnia Imperials
- G – Bob Reid, Toronto Balmy Beach Beachers
- G – Pat Bulter, Sarnia Imperials
- T – Cliff Parsons, Sarnia Imperials
- T – Tommy Burns, Montreal Westmounts

== 1939 Canadian Football Awards ==
- Jeff Russel Memorial Trophy (IRFU MVP) – Bill Davies (FW), Montreal Royals
- Imperial Oil Trophy (ORFU MVP) - Eddie Thompson - Toronto Balmy Beach Beachers
