= Edmonton Eskimos (disambiguation) =

The Edmonton Eskimos are a Canadian Football League team, known since 2021 as the Edmonton Elks.

Edmonton Eskimos may also refer to:

- Edmonton Rugby Foot-ball Club, known at times as the Eskimos
- Edmonton Eskimos Football Club (1938)
- Edmonton Eskimos (baseball)
- Edmonton Eskimos (ice hockey)
