= Alan Haycock =

Canadian football player

Profile
- Positions: Forward, Halfback

Personal information
- Born: c. 1917

Career history
- 1939: Winnipeg Blue Bombers

Awards and highlights
- Grey Cup champion (1939)

Alan Haycock (born c. 1917) was a Canadian football player who played for the Winnipeg Blue Bombers. He won the Grey Cup with them in 1939.
