= Isbister =

Isbister may refer to:

== People ==
- Alexander Kennedy Isbister (1822–1883), Canadian explorer
- Bob Isbister (1885–1963), CFL football player
- Bob Isbister Jr., Canadian Football League player in the 1930s and 1940s, son of the above
- Brad Isbister (born 1977), NHL hockey player
- Clair Isbister (1915–2008), Australian paediatrician
- James Isbister (1833–1915), Métis founder of Prince Albert, Saskatchewan, Canada
- Katherine Isbister, American game and human computer interaction researcher and designer
- Malcolm Isbister (1850–1920), Scottish-born Canadian politician
- Rod Isbister (born 1963), ice hockey player in the 1980s

== Places ==
- Isbister, Shetland, village in Shetland, Scotland
- Loch of Isbister, Whalsay, Shetland Islands
- Isbister, Orkney, Scotland, site of the Tomb of the Eagles
- Isbister Lake, lake in Saskatchewan, Canada
