= Desgagnés =

Desgagnés is a Canadian surname. Notable people with the surname include:

- Jean-Simon Desgagnés (born 1998), Canadian steeplechase runner
- Jean-Yves Desgagnés, Canadian political activist
- Nathalie Sinclair-Desgagné (born 1988), Canadian politician
