= Neil Taylor =

Neil Taylor may refer to:

- Neil Taylor (cricketer, born 1959), English cricketer
- Neil Taylor (cricketer, born 1964), English cricketer
- Neil Taylor (footballer) (born 1989), Welsh footballer
- Neil Taylor (journalist) (born 1959), English music journalist
- Neil Taylor (guitarist) (born 1961), English guitarist
- Neil Taylor (Neighbours), fictional character from the soap opera Neighbours
- Piffles Taylor (1893/4–1946), Canadian World War I pilot, Canadian football player, coach, and executive
