= Hal Davidson =

Canadian football player

Profile
- Positions: G, C

Personal information
- Born: c. 1912

Career history
- 1939–1940: Winnipeg Blue Bombers

Awards and highlights
- Grey Cup champion (1939)

Hal Davidson (born c. 1912) was a Canadian football player who played for the Winnipeg Blue Bombers. He won the Grey Cup with them in 1939.
