= Boudrias =

Boudrias is a Canadian surname. Notable people with the surname include:

- André Boudrias (1943–2019), Canadian ice hockey player
- Christine Boudrias (born 1972), Canadian short track speed skater
- Luc Boudrias (born 1960), Canadian sound engineer
- Michel Boudrias (born 1977), Canadian politician
