= Carl Krisko =

Canadian football player

Profile
- Positions: G, Halfback

Personal information
- Born: c. 1917

Career history
- 1938–1940: Winnipeg Blue Bombers

Awards and highlights
- Grey Cup champion (1939)

Carl Krisko was a Canadian football player who played for the Winnipeg Blue Bombers. He won the Grey Cup with them in 1939.
