= 1940 Toronto Argonauts season =

CFL team season

- Head coach: Lew Hayman
- Home stadium: Varsity Stadium

Results
- Record: 4–2
- Division place: 2nd, IRFU
- Playoffs: Lost IRFU Final

The 1940 Toronto Argonauts season was the 54th season for the team since the franchise's inception in 1873. The team finished in second place in the Interprovincial Rugby Football Union with a 4–2 record and qualified for the playoffs, but lost the two-game total-points IRFU Final series to the Ottawa Rough Riders.

== Preseason ==
Game	Date	Opponent	Result	Record	Venue	Attendance
A	September 28	vs. Toronto Balmy Beach	L 3–12	0–1	Varsity Stadium	9,113

== Regular season ==
=== Standings ===
Interprovincial Rugby Football Union
Team	GP	W	L	T	PF	PA	Pts
Ottawa Rough Riders	6	5	1	0	116	40	10
Toronto Argonauts	6	4	2	0	58	79	8
Hamilton Tigers	6	2	4	0	45	73	4
Montreal Football Club	6	1	5	0	39	66	2

=== Schedule ===
Week	Date	Opponent	Final score	Record
1	Oct 5	at Montreal Football Club	W 9–8	1–0
2	Oct 12	vs. Hamilton Tigers	W 17–5	2–0
3	Oct 19	at Ottawa Rough Riders	L 6–41	2–1
4	Oct 26	vs. Ottawa Rough Riders	W 11–9	3–1
5	Nov 2	at Hamilton Tigers	L 0–5	3–2
6	Nov 9	vs. Montreal Football Club	W 15–11	4–2

== Postseason ==
Game	Date	Opponent	Result	Venue
IRFU Final Game 1	Nov 16	at Ottawa Rough Riders	L 1–12	Lansdowne Park
IRFU Final Game 2	Nov 23	vs. Ottawa Rough Riders	L 1–8	Varsity Stadium
