= 1941 Toronto Argonauts season =

CFL team season

- Head coach: Lew Hayman
- Home stadium: Varsity Stadium

Results
- Record: 5–1
- Division place: 2nd, ERFU
- Playoffs: Lost ERFU Final

The 1941 Toronto Argonauts season was the 55th season for the team since the franchise's inception in 1873. The team finished in second place in the Eastern Rugby Football Union with a 5–1 record and qualified for the playoffs, but lost the two-game total-points ERFU Final series to the Ottawa Rough Riders.

== Regular season ==
=== Standings ===
Eastern Rugby Football Union
Team	GP	W	L	T	PF	PA	Pts
Ottawa Rough Riders	6	5	1	0	72	21	10
Toronto Argonauts	6	5	1	0	66	42	10
Toronto Balmy Beach Beachers	6	2	4	0	27	34	4
Montreal Bulldogs	6	0	6	0	12	80	0

=== Schedule ===
As part of the festivities marking the centenary of Queen's University, the regular-season game between the Argos and Bulldogs on 18 October was played at Richardson Stadium in Kingston, Ontario by agreement between the organizers and the Montreal club.

Week	Date	Opponent	Result	Record
1	Sept 27	vs. Toronto Balmy Beach Beachers	W 9–6	1–0
2	Oct 4	vs. Ottawa Rough Riders	W 7–3	2–0
3	Oct 11	vs. Montreal Bulldogs	W 24–3	3–0
4	Oct 18	at Montreal Bulldogs (in Kingston)	W 12–1	4–0
5	Oct 25	at Ottawa Rough Riders	L 6–24	4–1
6	Nov 1	vs. Toronto Balmy Beach Beachers	W 8–5	5–1

== Postseason ==
Game	Date	Opponent	Result	Record	Venue
ERFU Final Game 1	Nov 8	at Ottawa Rough Riders	W 16–8	1–0	Lansdowne Park
ERFU Final Game 2	Nov 15	vs. Ottawa Rough Riders	L 1–10	1–1	Varsity Stadium
