= Peterborough Orfuns =

Canadian football team

General information
- Founded: 1938; 88 years ago
- Folded: 1939; 87 years ago
- Headquartered: Peterborough, Ontario

League / conference affiliations
- Ontario Rugby Football Union

The Peterborough Orfuns were a Canadian football team in the Ontario Rugby Football Union (ORFU) that played in the 1938 and 1939 seasons. The name (pronounced like "orphans") was a play on the league name: O R F Uns. The team later competed in an intermediate league between Senior ORFU and Junior football, reaching the national championship game three times. In 1952, they lost 31–18 to the Norwood/St. Boniface Legionaries of Manitoba then in 1954 lost 16–12 to the Winnipeg Rams. In 1955, they finally became national champions.

== ORFU season-by-season ==
Season	W	L	T	PF	PA	Pts	Finish	Playoffs
1938	1	5	0	15	158	2	4th, IRFU	Last place
1939	0	6	0	16	105	0	4th, IRFU	Last place
