= Joe Tubman =

Canadian football player (1897–1975)

Profile
- Positions: Fullback, Placekicker

Personal information
- Born: August 18, 1897; Ottawa, Ontario, Canada
- Died: November 29, 1975 (aged 78); Ottawa, Ontario, Canada

Career history
- 1919–1931: Ottawa Rough Riders
- Canadian Football Hall of Fame (Class of 1968)

Robert Joseph Tubman (August 18, 1897 – November 29, 1975) was a Canadian football player and referee and Ottawa businessman. He was a member of two Grey Cup championship teams.

== Playing career ==
Tubman was a star football player in the Canadian Football League for thirteen seasons for the Ottawa Rough Riders, then known as the Ottawa Senators. Tubman led his team to two Grey Cup wins, in 1925 and 1926. After retiring from the field, Tubman worked as a referee for 15 years.

== Awards ==
He was inducted into the Canadian Football Hall of Fame in 1968 and into the Canada's Sports Hall of Fame in 1975.

== Personal life ==
He died in 1975, and was interred in Pinecrest Cemetery in Ottawa.
