= Jack Sullivan (journalist) =

Canadian journalist and writer (1913–1992)

- Born: September 15, 1913; Toronto, Ontario, Canada
- Died: June 11, 1992 (aged 78); Langley, British Columbia, Canada
- Known for: The Canadian Press sports editor
- Awards: Canada's Sports Hall of Fame; Canadian Football Hall of Fame

John Arthur Sullivan (September 15, 1913 – June 11, 1992) was a Canadian journalist and writer. He worked for The Canadian Press from 1929 to 1975, where he served as the sports editor for 27 years, and covered the Olympic Games, the Stanley Cup, the Commonwealth Games, and the Grey Cup. He amassed background information on players, coaches, when no previous database had existed, which was subsequently used as a reference by sports media across Canada. He later served as the head researcher for the Canadian Broadcasting Corporation in preparation for coverage of the 1976 Summer Olympics. He was inducted into the builder category of Canada's Sports Hall of Fame in 1983, and was posthumously inducted into the Football Reporters of Canada section of the Canadian Football Hall of Fame in 1994.

== Journalism and writing ==
John Arthur Sullivan was born on September 15, 1913, in Toronto, Ontario. The Canadian Press (CP) hired him as a courier at age 16 in 1929, then promoted him to the editorial staff in 1937. In 1948, he became the first person to serve as the sports editor for CP. He oversaw the sports department at CP for 27 years, and covered a variety of events including the Olympic Games, the Commonwealth Games, the Stanley Cup, and the Grey Cup. During this time, he amassed background information on the sports, players, and coaches, when little information was previously available. His collection of information was subsequently used for decades by sports media in Canada.

Sullivan authored three books. His book, The Stanley Cup: First official history of hockey's most famous trophy, 1893–1957, was published in 1958. He also researched stories and statistics related to the Grey Cup, wrote The Grey Cup Story released in 1955, then expanded on his work with The Grey Cup story: The dramatic history of football's most coveted award, released in 1974. He retired from CP in 1975, then worked for the Canadian Broadcasting Corporation as its head researcher until 1976. He prepared the information kits on the athletes used by the CBC for the 1976 Summer Olympics in Montreal.

== Personal life ==
Sullivan was married to Jackie, and had one son and one daughter. He resided in Toronto for many years before relocating to Langley, British Columbia. He died after a six-month illness in Langley, on June 11, 1992, and was interred in St. Mary's Catholic Cemetery in Barrie, Ontario.

== Awards and legacy ==
Sullivan's columns were described by his colleagues as entertaining, informative, accurate, and balanced. Toronto Star sports editor Milt Dunnell referred to Sullivan as "the newsman's newsman".

Sullivan was inducted into the builder category of Canada's Sports Hall of Fame in 1983, and was posthumously inducted into the Football Reporters of Canada section of the Canadian Football Hall of Fame in 1994.
