= Abe Eliowitz =

American gridiron football player (1910–1981)

Profile
- Positions: Running back, wide receiver

Personal information
- Born: November 10, 1910; New York, New York, U.S.
- Died: November 19, 1981 (aged 71); Livonia, Michigan, U.S.

Career information
- College: Michigan State University

Career history
- 1933–1935: Ottawa Rough Riders
- 1936–1937: Montreal Indians

Awards and highlights
- 5× CFL All-Star (1933–1937); Jeff Russel Memorial Trophy (1935)
- Canadian Football Hall of Fame (Class of 1969)

Abe Eliowitz (November 10, 1910 – November 19, 1981) was a star football player in American college football and in the days before the Canadian Football League (CFL). He also played college baseball.

== Early life and education ==
Eliowitz attended Michigan State University from 1930 to 1932. In 1931, Eliowitz was named an All America all-star honorable mention, and received the first MVP (Governor of Michigan) award ever given by Michigan State, and the Spartans finished with a record of 5–3–1.

In 1932, Abe was co-captain and was named Grantland Rice All America honorable mention as MSU had its best season during his career, compiling a record of 7–1–0. An all-around athlete, Eliowitz played on the baseball team and is sixth all-time in school history in triples in a season with six (1931), and triples in a career with 10.

Eliowitz always attracted attention, as both a college and professional player, with his highly skilled left-handed passing and punting.

== Career ==
After graduating, Eliowitz went to Canada to play football. He played five seasons (1933–1937), three with the Ottawa Rough Riders and two with the Montreal Indians. He was an all-star five times as a running back and as a flying wing. In 1935, he led the Interprovincial Rugby Football Union with 62 points and was the winner of the Jeff Russel Memorial Trophy for fair play and sportsmanship. He was inducted into the Canadian Football Hall of Fame in 1969.

After playing in Canada, he became a physical education teacher in the Detroit school system and continued to coach football, winning city league championships at Denby and Cooley High School.

He was married to Gertrude Lipman on July 26, 1933, in Detroit and later to Ida Sara Lachman on February 14, 1945, in Detroit.
