= Canadian name =

Canadian naming conventions vary based on whether one is Indigenous, English Canadian, or French Canadian.

== English Canadian names ==
In English-speaking Canada, names follow much the same convention as they do in the United Kingdom and United States. Usually the "first name" (as described in e.g. birth certificates) is what a child goes by, although a middle name (if any) may be preferred—both also known as "given names." The "last name" is usually taken from a child's parents, which may be from either or both (joined by hyphenation). (Note: Middle names are optional and are generally only used on official documentation (multiple middle names are rare but officially recognized).) Outside Quebec (with its distinct civil law system), either spouse has the right to assume the other's last name, as long as it is not intended for the purposes of fraud. Getting married does not result in a legal change of name nor automatically change identification records. (Note: Marriage certificate is considered proof.)

It is not uncommon to see names that follow patterns differing from the English and French naming conventions.

== French Canadian names ==
=== Given names in Quebec ===
In French Canada, up until the late 1960s, Catholic children often were given three names at birth (usually not hyphenated): the first, Marie or Joseph, were honorific in nature to honor the mother and legal father of Jesus. The second was usually the name of the godfather or godmother, while the third and last given name was the name used in everyday situations. Thus, a child prenamed Joseph Bruno Jean on his birth or baptismal certificate would indicate the baby was a boy, the godfather's first name was Bruno and that the child would be called Jean (and not Joseph) for all intents and purposes of everyday life. A real-life example of this naming convention was that of Canadian prime minister Jean Chrétien, who was born Joseph Jacques Jean Chrétien.

Although it is still permitted to list multiple names on a birth certificate, it is uncommon for people to even be aware of their other given names, and the practice of using religious names became increasingly rarer after the Quiet Revolution as baptism ceremonies gradually became less common. The Quebec government, prior to 2023, officially recommended not using more than four given names; since then, a hard limit of four given names applies.

=== Surnames in Quebec ===
Currently, most couples give the child the surname of the father, though the Quebec civil code allows a couple to combine at most two of their surnames, with or without hyphens. Thus a couple named Joseph Bouchard-Tremblay and Marie Dion-Roy could give to their children the surnames Bouchard, Tremblay, Dion, Roy, Bouchard-Tremblay, Dion-Roy, Bouchard-Dion, Bouchard-Roy, and so on.

Following traditional French custom, Quebec women did not change their legal names upon marriage, but were referred to by their husband's surname in common speech. This latter practice fell out of favour following the Quiet Revolution, and spouses now retain their surnames after marriage in all contexts. A name change for marriage is difficult or impossible to do if desired, as requests to adopt a husband's name after marriage are typically denied.

=== The "nom-dit" tradition ===
Until the late 19th century, several families also had a nom-dit tradition. This was a family nickname (literally a 'said name'). The origins of the noms-dits were various. Some noms-dits were the war-name of the first settler, while he was a soldier: Hébert dit Jolicœur (Pretty Heart, cf. Braveheart), Thomas dit Tranchemontagne (mountain chopper). Some denoted the place of origin of the first settler: Langevin (Anjou), Barbeau dit Poitevin (Poitou). Others denoted a characteristic of the person or of his dwelling: Lacourse, Lépine, Larivière.

== Indigenous Canadian names ==
Many, if not most, Indigenous Canadians (primarily in this First Nations and Métis people, but also Inuit to an extent) carry European surnames, and most of those are French names, either because of intermarriage with French Canadian and Métis men and indigenous women or because a surname was assigned to an indigenous person by a French-speaking Christian missionary. The most notable example is the Cardinal family, which started with a few French Canadians moving to the West and now includes thousands of Cree and Métis people in Alberta, Saskatchewan and beyond. Other examples would include Belcourt. Other European groups have contributed notably to indigenous, and especially Métis names, such as Isbister (Scottish), Hardisty (English) and so on.

On the Great Plains, many First Nations people have surnames that are direct English translations of an ancestor's given name. Often these are multiple words long; examples would be Born with a Tooth (Blackfoot), Chief-Moon (Blood), or Whiteknife (Cree).

For others, a name in their ancestral language is rendered in English or French spelling such as Tootoosis (Plains Cree), Newashish (Atikamekw), or Yahgulanaas (Haida).

Some people have a legal or baptismal name in English or French and separate name in their ancestral language, for example Oronhyatekha (Mohawk), who was also called Peter Martin.

== Use of titles in Canadian English ==
Courtesy titles may be used on official documents in Canada, and are frequently used in formal situations such as business correspondence or meetings.

As in other English-speaking countries, the following courtesy titles are used by default or can be chosen by the bearer when completing a form or application:

- Mr. (Mister) (referencing any man)
- Mrs. (Missus) (referencing a married, widowed, or divorced woman)
- Miss (Miss) (referencing a single young woman)
- Ms. (Miz) (referencing a woman of any age without specifying her marital status).

When referring to a woman whose marital status one does not know, it is common to write Ms., but no specific rules apply. Using a courtesy title in a non-formal situation may be construed as wrong and awkward.

Although each person has one of the above titles in their name, other titles may be acquired through various ways, including education and employment. The titles of Dr. (doctor) and Prof. (Professor) are common examples. When referring to such individuals in a professional context (such as a medical doctor's practice), these titles are often used instead of their given name. For instance, a doctor named Mark Roberts could be referred to as "Dr. Roberts". While an individual might be fine with being referred to without their title, it is generally frowned upon to do so without asking.

The parliamentary titles Hon. (honourable) or Rt. Hon. (right honourable) are given to the justices of the Supreme Court of Canada, serving cabinet ministers, either federal or provincial/territorial and in some cases are retained for life; for example in the case of retired prime ministers and those who were appointed to the Queen's Privy Council for Canada (federal cabinet ministers and others appointed to the Council from time to time). Senators are designated with the prenominal title Sen. (Senator) while in office.

Foreign titles, such as Sir and Count, are not used; the acceptance of foreign honours by Canadian citizens is not permitted under the Nickle resolution and subsequent Acts of Parliament.

== Suffixes ==
Suffixes always come after the family name, and are also acquired for various reasons. Suffixes are only used in oral communication when necessary, and are also rarely written on the wish of the individual bearing the suffix.

The most common suffixes are Sr. (Senior) and Jr. (Junior). When an individual names their child after themselves or another family member (not necessarily immediate), that individual then bears the suffix Sr. and the offspring bears the suffix Jr., which may also be replaced with II (the second). The suffix "III" is used after either Jr or II and like subsequent numeric suffixes, does not need to happen in one family line. For example, if John and Bob Gruber are brothers and if Bob has a son before John, he will call his son John, II. If John now has a son, his son is John, Jr. As time passes, the III suffix goes to the first born of either John Jr or John II. This is how it is possible and correct for a Jr. to father a IV. Such suffixes are rare amongst French-Canadians due to the strongly generational nature of most French given names.

Other completely accepted suffixes include:

- M.D. (Medical Doctor)
- Ph.D. (Doctor of Philosophy)
- MP (Member of Parliament), for federal elected politicians
- Abbreviations for provincially elected politicians:
  - MLA (Member of the Legislative Assembly)
  - MPP (Member of Provincial Parliament, Ontario only)
  - MNA (Member of the National Assembly, Quebec only)
  - MHA (Member of the House of Assembly, Newfoundland and Labrador only)

MP and its provincial or territorial equivalents may be followed by the name of the constituency in which that member was elected. For example: Buddy Johnson, M.P. London North-Centre. However, the constituency name or similar designations are not shown of official documents outside of parliament and is never used in casual communication.

Postnominals granted under the Canadian honour system include PC (Privy Councillor, granted to federal cabinet ministers and some other senior politicians including leaders of opposition parties); CM (Member of the Order of Canada); OC (Officer of the Order of Canada); and CC (Companion of the Order of Canada, the highest rank of that order). For a list of other postnominals, including professional titles and orders, provincial honours, and honours in gift of the Crown, see List of post-nominal letters in Canada.

== See also ==
- List of most common Canadian surnames
