= John DeGruchy =

Canadian football player

Personal information
- Born: December 15, 1860; London, UK
- Died: January 23, 1940 (aged 79); Toronto

Career history
- 1900–1935: Ontario Rugby Football Union
- 1925, 1930, 1935: Canadian Rugby Union
- Canadian Football Hall of Fame (Class of 1963)

John DeGruchy (December 15, 1860 – January 23, 1940) was the president of the Ontario Rugby Football Union for 25 years, and he promoted the Thanksgiving Day Classic between the Sarnia Imperials and the Toronto Balmy Beach Beachers. He was inducted into the Canadian Football Hall of Fame in 1963 and into the Canada's Sports Hall of Fame in 1975.
