= Orlando Segatore =

Canadian football player (1923–2016)

Profile
- Positions: Guard, Tackle

Personal information
- Born: July 28, 1923; Montreal, Quebec, Canada
- Died: 19 February 2016 (aged 92); Toronto, Ontario, Canada

Career information
- CJFL: Rosemont Bombers

Career history
- 1946–49, 1951: Montreal Alouettes

Awards and highlights
- Grey Cup champion (1949)

Orlando Segatore (July 28, 1923 - February 19, 2016) was a Canadian professional football player. A lineman, Segatore was a Grey Cup champion Canadian Football League player in 1949.

A native Montrealer, Segatore played football with the Rosemont Bombers junior team. He was a player with the inaugural Montreal Alouettes in 1946 and was part of the Larks first Grey Cup championship in 1949. He played 40 games for the Als over five seasons, having missing the 1950 season due to a contract dispute. His brother, Louis Segatore, was also a Grey Cup champion.
