= James S. Dixon Trophy =

Canadian Football League trophy

The James S. Dixon Trophy is a Canadian Football League trophy, formerly awarded to the East Division champions. The winner of this trophy faced the winner of the N. J. Taylor Trophy for the Grey Cup. Both the James S. Dixon Trophy and N. J. Taylor Trophy were retired in 2004.

The Dixon Trophy was originally presented in 1912 by James S. Dixon of Hamilton to the Inter-Provincial Rugby Football Union to represent its championship, which it continually did even as the IRFU changed names to the present-day East Division. In 1995, as part of the failed American expansion, it was presented to the winners of the South Division.

== James S. Dixon Trophy winners ==
- Bold text represents the eventual Grey Cup champions.
- 2003 – Montreal Alouettes
- 2002 – **Montreal Alouettes**
- 2001 – Winnipeg Blue Bombers
- 2000 – Montreal Alouettes
- 1999 – **Hamilton Tiger-Cats**
- 1998 – Hamilton Tiger-Cats
- 1997 – **Toronto Argonauts**
- 1996 – **Toronto Argonauts**
- 1995 – **Baltimore Stallions**
- 1994 – Baltimore CFLers
- 1993 – Winnipeg Blue Bombers
- 1992 – Winnipeg Blue Bombers
- 1991 – **Toronto Argonauts**
- 1990 – **Winnipeg Blue Bombers**
- 1989 – Hamilton Tiger-Cats
- 1988 – **Winnipeg Blue Bombers**
- 1987 – Toronto Argonauts
- 1986 – **Hamilton Tiger-Cats**
- 1985 – Hamilton Tiger-Cats
- 1984 – Hamilton Tiger-Cats
- 1983 – **Toronto Argonauts**
- 1982 – Toronto Argonauts
- 1981 – Ottawa Rough Riders
- 1980 – Hamilton Tiger-Cats
- 1979 – Montreal Alouettes
- 1978 – Montreal Alouettes
- 1977 – **Montreal Alouettes**
- 1976 – **Ottawa Rough Riders**
- 1975 – Montreal Alouettes
- 1974 – **Montreal Alouettes**
- 1973 – **Ottawa Rough Riders**
- 1972 – **Hamilton Tiger-Cats**
- 1971 – Toronto Argonauts
- 1970 – **Montreal Alouettes**
- 1969 – **Ottawa Rough Riders**
- 1968 – **Ottawa Rough Riders**
- 1967 – **Hamilton Tiger-Cats**
- 1966 – Ottawa Rough Riders
- 1965 – **Hamilton Tiger-Cats**
- 1964 – Hamilton Tiger-Cats
- 1963 – **Hamilton Tiger-Cats**
- 1962 – Hamilton Tiger-Cats
- 1961 – Hamilton Tiger-Cats
- 1960 – **Ottawa Rough Riders**
- 1959 – Hamilton Tiger-Cats
- 1958 – Hamilton Tiger-Cats
- 1957 – **Hamilton Tiger-Cats**
- 1956 – Montreal Alouettes
- 1955 – Montreal Alouettes
- 1954 – Montreal Alouettes
- 1953 – **Hamilton Tiger-Cats**
- 1952 – **Toronto Argonauts**
- 1951 – **Ottawa Rough Riders**
- 1950 – **Toronto Argonauts**
- 1949 – **Montreal Alouettes**
- 1948 – Ottawa Rough Riders
- 1947 – **Toronto Argonauts**
- 1946 – **Toronto Argonauts**
- 1945 – **Toronto Argonauts**
- 1944 – not awarded
- 1943 – not awarded
- 1942 – not awarded
- 1941 – Ottawa Rough Riders
- 1940 – **Ottawa Rough Riders**
- 1939 – Ottawa Rough Riders
- 1938 – **Toronto Argonauts**
- 1937 – **Toronto Argonauts**
- 1936 – Ottawa Rough Riders
