= Piffles Taylor =

Canadian football player and coach (1895–1947)

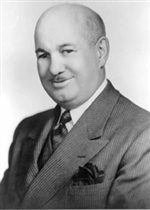
Piffles Taylor

Neil Joseph "Piffles" Taylor (March 29, 1895 – May 24, 1947) was a Canadian World War I pilot, Canadian football player, coach, and executive. He was "largely responsible for the development of football in Western Canada".

Born in Collingwood, Ontario, and raised in Yellow Grass, Saskatchewan, he studied law and played collegiately at the University of Toronto before joining the Regina Rugby Club in 1914. In 1916, he joined the Royal Flying Corps and became a fighter pilot. He lost an eye when he was shot down and spent a year in a German prisoner of war camp during World War I. His brother Sam, also a pilot, was shot down and killed.

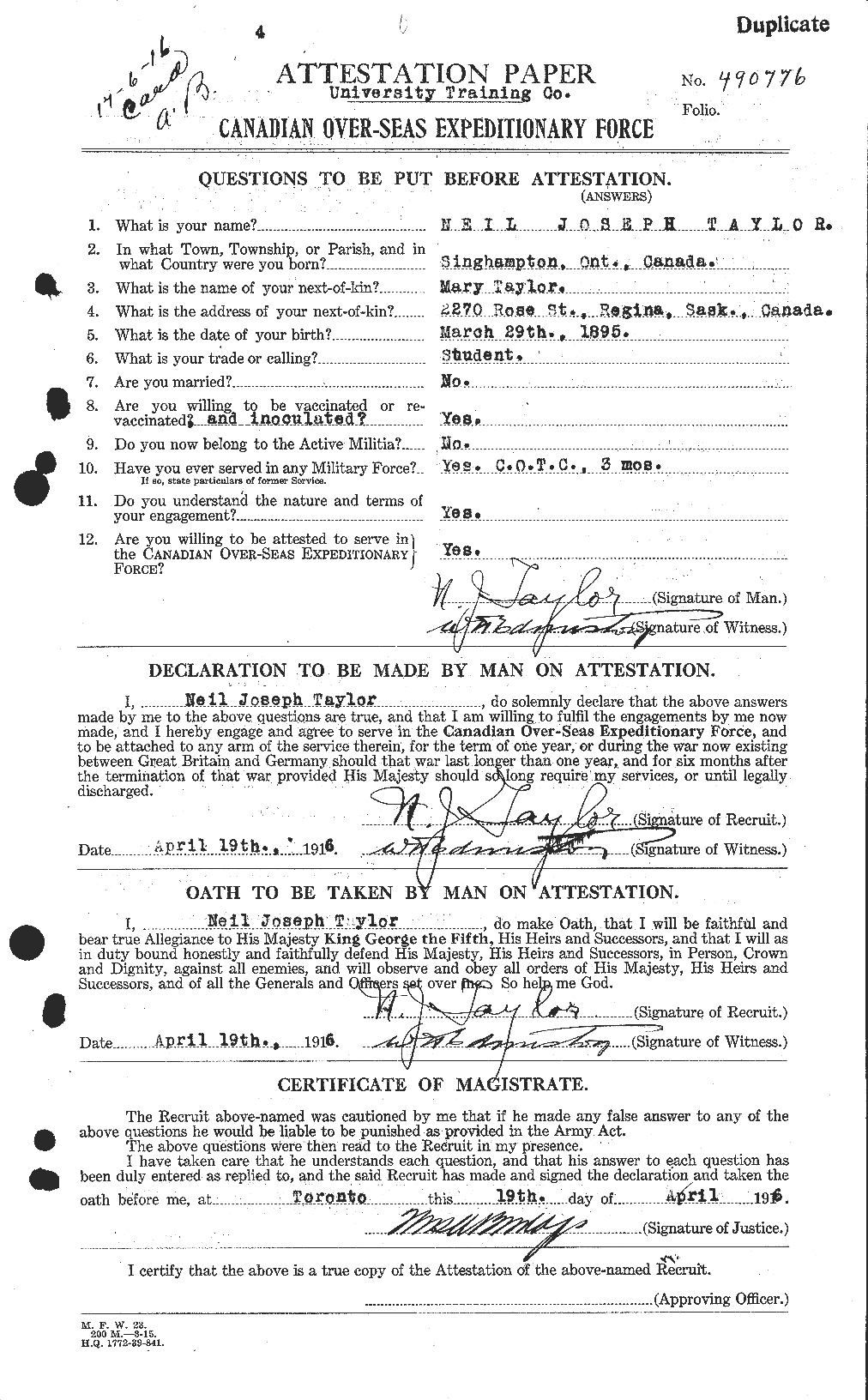
Neil Joseph "Piffles" Taylor Recruitment Form

Despite the loss of an eye, Taylor returned to the Regina RC in 1919, quarterbacking the team to the Hugo Ross Trophy over Calgary. He played for them through 1921, and served as their coach in 1922 and 1923. He joined the newly renamed Regina Roughriders as their executive in 1926. In 1934, he was named team president, a post he held until 1937, when he was briefly president of the Western Interprovincial Football Union. He presided over the WIFU again from 1941 to 1942, and served as president of the Canadian Rugby Union in 1946 before his sudden death the same year. He was posthumously inducted to the Order of the British Empire.

The home of the Roughriders, Park de Young, was renamed the now-defunct Taylor Field in his honour in 1947, and the Hugo Ross Trophy, awarded annually to the champions of the WIFU, was replaced with the N. J. Taylor Trophy in 1948. Taylor was posthumously inducted to the Canadian Football Hall of Fame in 1963. In 2006, the street directly in front of the now-defunct stadium's west entrance was renamed Piffles Taylor Way.
