= Yahgulanaas =

Yahgulanaas is a surname. Notable people with the surname include:

- Lisa Hageman Yahgulanaas, Canadian Haida weaver
- Michael Nicoll Yahgulanaas (born 1954), Canadian visual artist, author, and public speaker
