= Montreal Westmounts =

General information
- Founded: 1939; 87 years ago
- Folded: 1939; 87 years ago
- Headquartered: Montreal, Quebec, Canada

League / conference affiliations
- Ontario Rugby Football Union

Montreal Westmounts was a Canadian football team in Ontario Rugby Football Union. The team played in the 1939 season.

== Canadian Football Hall of Famers ==
- John Ferraro

== ORFU season-by-season ==
Season	W	L	T	PF	PA	Pts	Finish	Playoffs
1939	4	1	1	71	45	9	1st, ORFU	Lost Final
