= Edmonton Eskimos Football Club (1938) =

Edmonton Eskimos

General information
- Founded: 1938
- Folded: 1939
- Stadium: Clarke Stadium
- Headquartered: Edmonton, Alberta

League / conference affiliations
- Western Interprovincial Football Union

The Edmonton Eskimos were a Canadian football team in the Western Interprovincial Football Union. The team played in the 1938 and 1939 seasons. The team took advantage of the new Clarke Stadium as their home field, but the Second World War led to the team's demise. This was the second of three incarnations of the Eskimos name; previously the name was used from 1908 to 1924 and 1928 and 1929, and later in 1949 a new Edmonton team used it until 2020.

== WIFU season-by-season ==
| Season | G | W | L | T | PF | PA | Finish | Playoffs |
|---|---|---|---|---|---|---|---|---|
| 1938 | 8 | 0 | 8 | 0 | 29 | 117 | 1st | |
| 1939 | 11 | 3 | 8 | 0 | 80 | 147 | 2nd | |
