= Bob Isbister =

Canadian football player and official (1885–1963)

Profile
- Position: Flying wing

Personal information
- Born: June 9, 1885; Hamilton, Ontario, Canada
- Died: April 29, 1963 (aged 77); Hamilton, Ontario, Canada

Career history
- 1905–1915, 1919: Hamilton Tigers

Awards and highlights
- Grey Cup champion (1913)
- Canadian Football Hall of Fame (Class of 1965)

Robert "Big Bob" Isbister Sr. (June 9, 1885 – April 29, 1963) was a star football player in the Ontario Rugby Football Union 1905-1906 and then in the Big Four (IRFU) 1907-1915, 1919 for twelve seasons for the Hamilton Tigers. After retiring, he was a referee.

Isbister was born in Hamilton, Ontario, and died in Hamilton, Ontario. He was inducted into the Canadian Football Hall of Fame in 1965 and into the Canada's Sports Hall of Fame in 1975.

His son Bob Isbister Jr. was also an all-star Grey Cup champion Canadian football player, with the Toronto Argonauts.
