= Wes Cutler =

Canadian football wide receiver

Profile
- Position: Wide receiver

Personal information
- Born: February 17, 1911; Toronto, Ontario, Canada
- Died: June 10, 1956 (aged 45); Toronto, Ontario, Canada

Career information
- College: University of Toronto

Career history
- 1933–1938: Toronto Argonauts

Awards and highlights
- 3× Grey Cup champion (1933, 1937, 1938); Jeff Russel Memorial Trophy (1938)
- Canadian Football Hall of Fame (Class of 1968)

Wesley Cutler (February 17, 1911 – June 10, 1956) was a star football player in the Canadian Football League (CFL) for six seasons for the Toronto Argonauts. He was inducted into the Canadian Football Hall of Fame in 1968 and into the Canada's Sports Hall of Fame in 1975.
