= John Ferraro (Canadian football) =

American gridiron football player (1910–1981)

Johnny Ferraro
Profile
- Position: Halfback/Kicker

Personal information
- Born: 1910; Buffalo, New York, U.S.
- Died: September 28, 1981 (aged 70); Bridgewater, New Jersey, U.S.

Career information
- College: Cornell

Career history
- 1934–1935: Hamilton Tigers
- 1936–1937: Montreal Indians
- 1938: Montreal Nationals
- 1939: Montreal Westmounts
- 1940: Montreal Bulldogs

Awards and highlights
- 4× CFL All-Star (1935, 1937 1938, 1939); Imperial Oil Trophy (1938)
- Canadian Football Hall of Fame (Class of 1966)

John James Ferraro (1910 – September 28, 1981) was an American gridiron football player. He was an all-star football player in the Ontario Rugby Football Union and the Interprovincial Rugby Football Union. He was inducted into the Canadian Football Hall of Fame in 1966 and the Cornell Athletic Hall of Fame in 1978.

A graduate of Cornell University in 1934 with a degree in hotel administration, he captained both the football and basketball teams and was a member of the Quill and Dagger society. He came to Canada in 1934 and played two seasons with the Hamilton Tigers of the IRFU and played in the Grey Cup. Ferraro then moved to Montreal where he played for 4 teams. Starting in 1936, he suited up for the Montreal Indians, Montreal Nationals, Montreal Westmounts and Montreal Bulldogs. He was also playing coach of the Tigers and Indians.

Ferraro won the Imperial Oil Trophy in 1938 as MVP in the ORFU. He donated the trophy to the widow of Ormond Beach, a previous MVP who lost his life in an accident. The donors of the award sent a new trophy to Ferraro.

Ferraro was married to Edna Letts, of Scotia, New York. He died aged 70, on September 28, 1981, at the Bridgewater Convalescent Center in Bridgewater, New Jersey.
