= Bob Isbister Jr. =

Profile
- Positions: Halfback, Punter

Personal information
- Born: Hamilton, Ontario
- Listed height: 6 ft 2 in (1.88 m)

Career information
- College: University of Toronto

Career history
- 1937–38: Toronto Argonauts
- 1939: Hamilton Tigers
- 1942–43: Halifax Navy

Awards and highlights
- 2× Grey Cup champion (1937, 1938); 3× CFL All-Star (1937, 1938, 1939)

Bob Isbister Jr. was an all-star and Grey Cup champion Canadian football player, playing from 1937 to 1943. He was the son of Canadian football hall-of-famer Bob Isbister.

A graduate of the University of Toronto and a star with the Varsity Blues, Isbister joined the Toronto Argonauts for a brief but successful football career. Playing only 11 regular season games and 6 playoff games for the Boatmen, he won two Grey Cup championships and was twice an all-star. He was transferred by his employer to Hamilton in 1939, where he joined his father's team, the Hamilton Tigers, and was once again an all-star selection.

Isbister joined the RCN during World War II and played two final seasons with the Halifax Navy squad.
