= Bernard Wadsworth =

Canadian football player (1914–1966)

Bernard "Bunny" Wadsworth
No. 53
- Positions: Defensive lineman & offensive lineman

Personal information
- Born: c. 1914
- Died: January 23, 1966 (aged 51); Toronto, Ontario, Canada

Career history
- 1934–41: Ottawa Rough Riders

Awards and highlights
- Grey Cup champion (1940); 3× CFL All-Star (1938, 1939, 1940)

John Bernard "Bunny" Wadsworth (c. 1914 – January 23, 1966) was an all-star and Grey Cup champion Canadian football lineman. Playing in the early days of the Ottawa Rough Riders, before the Canadian Football League was formed, Wadsworth's career spanned eight seasons, and included three all-star selections and the 1940 Grey Cup championship. He was honored as a member of the Rough Rider "Half Century" team.

He and his wife Catherine (née Kehoe) had six children, one of whom was Michael "Mike" Wadsworth, Canadian football player, lawyer, businessman, sports analyst and Canadian Ambassador to the Republic of Ireland. He died at a hospital in Toronto in 1966 from kidney disease, aged 51.
