= Montreal Cubs =

Canadian rugby football team

- Founded: 1938; 87 years ago
- Folded: 1938; 87 years ago
- Based in: Montreal, Quebec, Canada
- League: Interprovincial Rugby Football Union

Montreal Cubs was a Canadian football team in Interprovincial Rugby Football Union. The team played in the 1938 season.

== IRFU season-by-season ==
Season	W	L	T	PF	PA	Pts	Finish	Playoffs
1938	0	6	0	30	168	0	4th, IRFU	Last Place
