= Montreal Royals (football) =

- Founded: 1939; 86 years ago
- Folded: 1939; 86 years ago
- Based in: Montreal, Quebec, Canada
- League: Interprovincial Rugby Football Union

Montreal Royals was a Canadian football team in Interprovincial Rugby Football Union. The team played in the 1939 season.

== Notable players ==
- Bill Davies

== IRFU season-by-season ==
Season	W	L	T	PF	PA	Pts	Finish	Playoffs
1939	0	5	1	23	84	8	4th, IRFU	Last Place
