= Montreal Nationals =

- Founded: 1937
- Folded: 1938
- Based in: Montreal, Quebec
- League: Quebec Rugby Football Union; Ontario Rugby Football Union

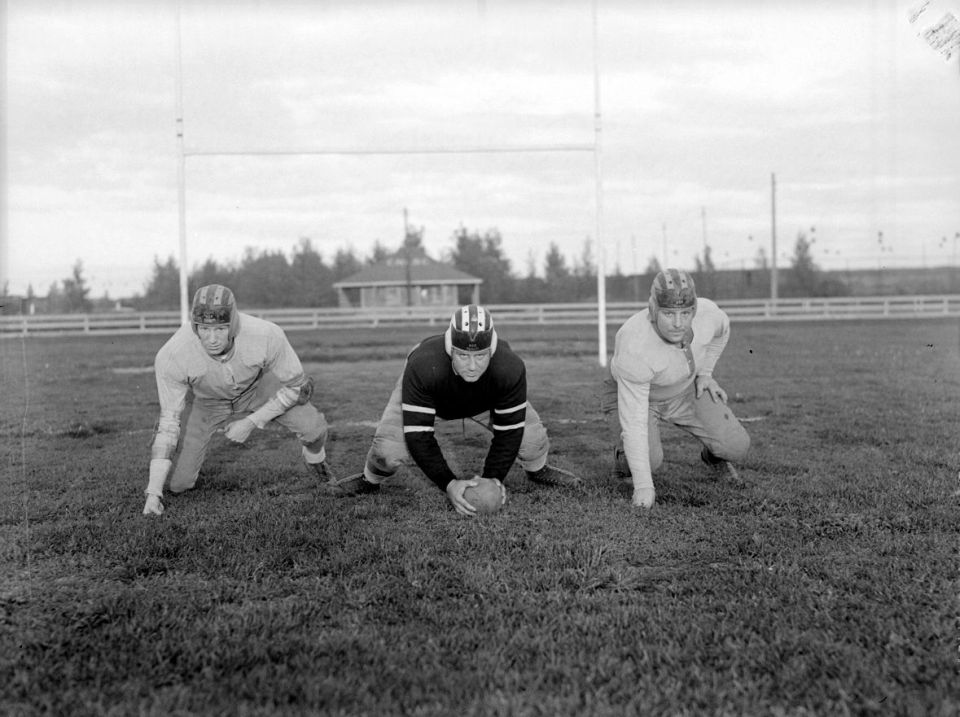
Fleming, Pat Ryan and Terry, players of the Montreal Nationals football team, posing with one knee on the ground and in suits.

The Montreal Nationals were a Canadian football team in the Ontario Rugby Football Union. The team played during the 1938 season. They were preceded by the CNR Nationals, who played for one year in 1937 in the short-lived revival of Quebec Rugby Football Union; this team formed the basis for the ORFU team.

== Canadian Football Hall of Famers ==
- John Ferraro

== QRFU & ORFU seasons ==
Season	League	W	L	T	PF	PA	Pts	Finish	Playoffs
1937	QRFU	3	2	1	54	48	9	2nd	-
1938	ORFU	3	1	2	77	42	8	2nd	-
