= Ross Trimble =

Canadian football player (1908–1950)

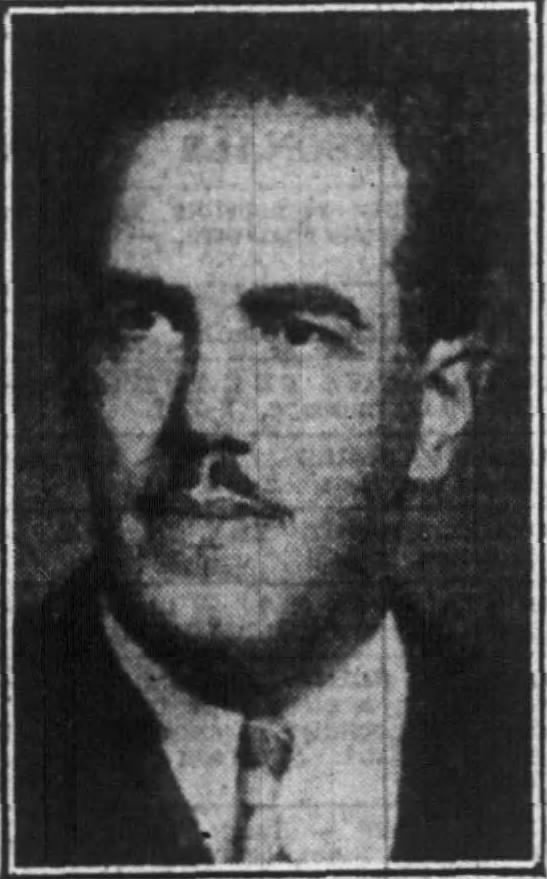

Profile
- Positions: Player, Coach

Personal information
- Born: 1908; Toronto, Ontario, Canada
- Died: March 24, 1950 (aged 41–42); Toronto, Ontario, Canada

Career history

Playing
- 1927–1930s: Toronto Balmy Beach Beachers

Coaching
- 1937–1941, 1945: Ottawa Rough Riders

Awards and highlights
- 3x Grey Cup champion (1927, 1930, 1940)

W. Ross Trimble (1908 – March 24, 1950) was a Canadian professional football player and coach, who was the head coach of the Ottawa Rough Riders for 6 seasons (1937–1941, 1945). They appeared in 3 Grey Cups while Trimble was coach, winning 1. Trimble also had won 2 Grey Cups with the Toronto Balmy Beach Beachers in the 1920s and 1930s. He died suddenly on March 24, 1950, at the age of 42. It was less than a week after the death of his 4 year old daughter.
