= Montreal Indians =

- Founded: 1936; 89 years ago
- Folded: 1937; 88 years ago
- Based in: Montreal, Quebec, Canada
- League: Interprovincial Rugby Football Union

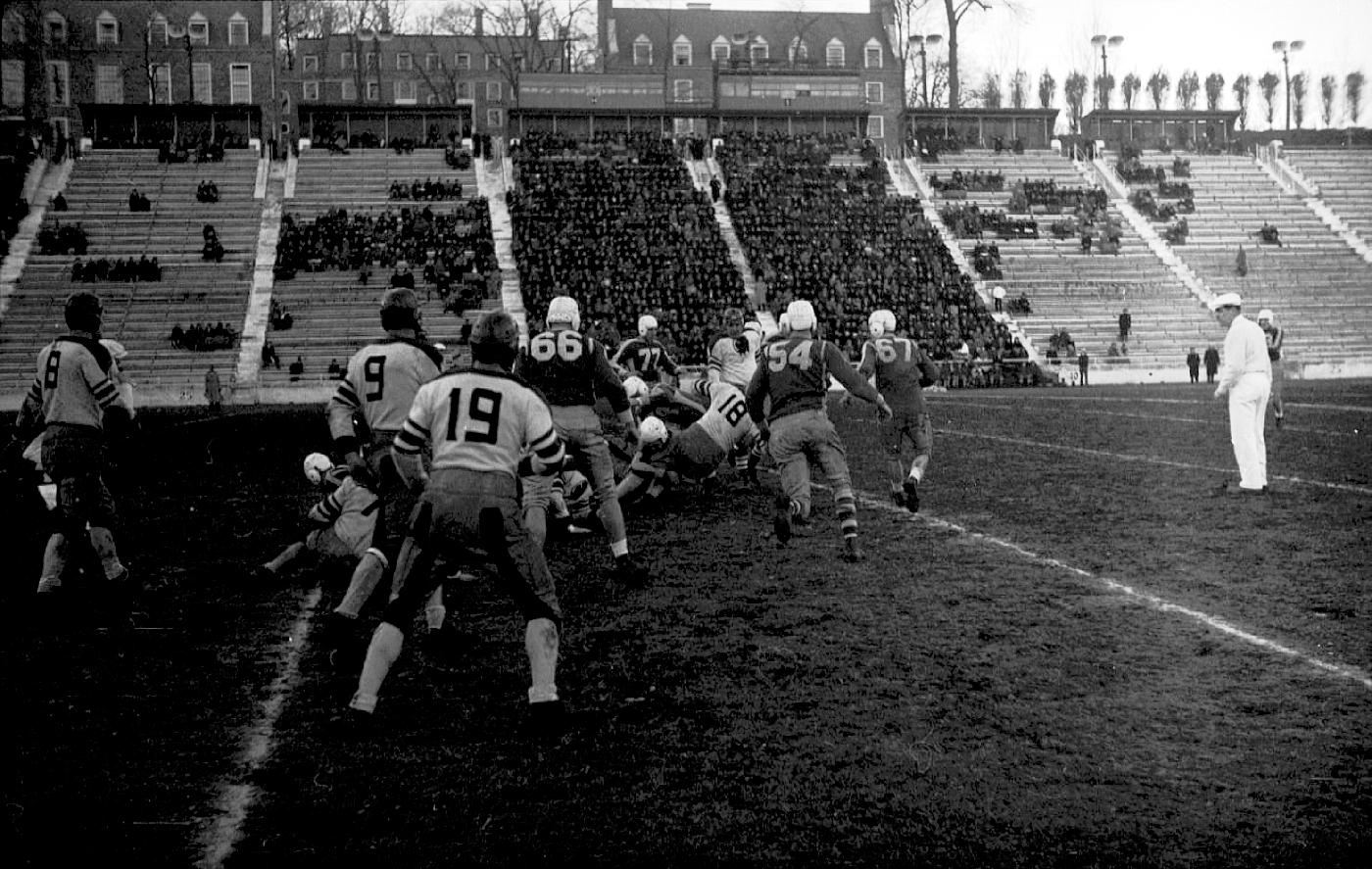
The Montreal Indians play the Toronto Argonauts at Percival Molson Memorial Stadium, November 6, 1937.

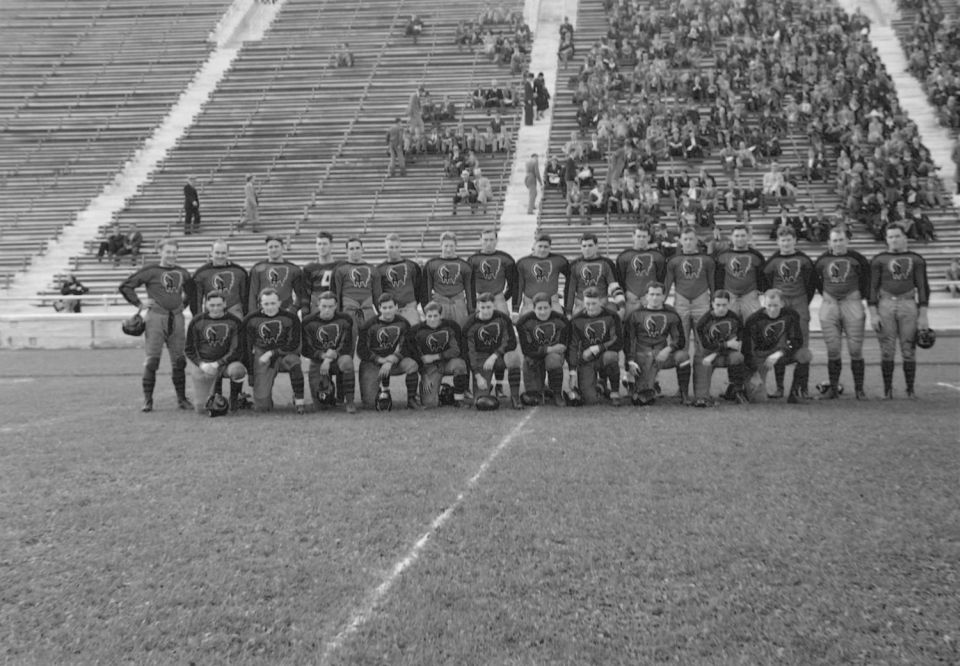
Football team "Montreal Indians" field Percival Molson Stadium of McGill University in Montreal.

Montreal Indians was a Canadian football team in the Interprovincial Rugby Football Union. The team played in the 1936 and 1937 seasons.

== Canadian Football Hall of Famers ==
- Abe Eliowitz
- John Ferraro

== IRFU season-by-season ==
Season	W	L	T	PF	PA	Pts	Finish	Playoffs
1936	2	4	0	45	59	4	4th, IRFU	Last Place
1937	2	4	0	35	49	4	4th, IRFU	Last Place
