= Montreal Bulldogs =

Canadian football team

- Founded: 1940
- Folded: 1941
- Based in: Montreal, Quebec
- League: Interprovincial Rugby Football Union

Montreal Bulldogs was a Canadian football team in Interprovincial Rugby Football Union. The team played in the 1940 and 1941 seasons. During their first season the team did not have a nickname, and was simply called Montreal Football Club, until the next season.

== Canadian Football Hall of Famers ==
- John Ferraro

== IRFU season-by-season ==
Season	W	L	T	PF	PA	Pts	Finish	Playoffs
1940	1	5	0	39	66	2	4th, IRFU	Last Place
1941	0	6	0	12	80	0	4th, IRFU	Last Place
