= List of Canadian Football League seasons =

This is a list of Canadian Football League (CFL) seasons, including seasons in Canadian football prior to the CFL's founding in 1958.

== Pre-CFL seasons ==
Years in Canadian Football
1880s			1882	1883	1884	1885	1886	1887	1888	1889
1890s	1890	1891	1892	1893	1894	1895	1896	1897	1898	1899
1900s	1900	1901	1902	1903	1904	1905	1906	1907	1908	1909
1910s	1910	1911	1912	1913	1914	1915	1916	1917	1918	1919
1920s	1920	1921	1922	1923	1924	1925	1926	1927	1928	1929
1930s	1930	1931	1932	1933	1934	1935	1936	1937	1938	1939
1940s	1940	1941	1942	1943	1944	1945	1946	1947	1948	1949
1950s	1950	1951	1952	1953	1954	1955	1956	1957		

== CFL seasons ==
=== Early CFL (1958–1986) ===
After the merger of the Big Four and WIFU, the first 29 CFL seasons each consisted of nine teams playing in the same nine cities. In 1961, inter-conference play began during the regular season. Until 1973, Western Canadian teams played 16 games, while Eastern Canadian teams played 14 games. Since then, all teams played 16 games per season until the season was expanded to 18 games in 1986.

Season	West		East		Grey Cup	
Season	GP	Top record	GP	Top record	No.	Champion
1958	16	Winnipeg Blue Bombers (13–3)	14	Hamilton Tiger-Cats (10–3–1)	46th	Winnipeg Blue Bombers
1959	16	Winnipeg Blue Bombers (12–4)	14	Hamilton Tiger-Cats (10–4)	47th	Winnipeg Blue Bombers
1960	16	Winnipeg Blue Bombers (14–2)	14	Toronto Argonauts (10–4)	48th	Ottawa Rough Riders
1961	16	Winnipeg Blue Bombers (13–3)	14	Hamilton Tiger-Cats (10–4)	49th	Winnipeg Blue Bombers
1962	16	Winnipeg Blue Bombers (11–5)	14	Hamilton Tiger-Cats (9–4–1)	50th	Winnipeg Blue Bombers
1963	16	BC Lions (12–4)	14	Hamilton Tiger-Cats (10–4)	51st	Hamilton Tiger-Cats
1964	16	BC Lions (11–2–3)	14	Hamilton Tiger-Cats (10–3–1)	52nd	BC Lions
1965	16	Calgary Stampeders (12–4)	14	Hamilton Tiger-Cats (10–4)	53rd	Hamilton Tiger-Cats
1966	16	Saskatchewan Roughriders (9–6–1)	14	Ottawa Rough Riders (11–3)	54th	Saskatchewan Roughriders
1967	16	Calgary Stampeders (12–4)	14	Hamilton Tiger-Cats (10–4)	55th	Hamilton Tiger-Cats
1968	16	Saskatchewan Roughriders (12–3–1)	14	Ottawa Rough Riders (9–3–2)	56th	Ottawa Rough Riders
1969	16	Saskatchewan Roughriders (13–3)	14	Ottawa Rough Riders (11–3)	57th	Ottawa Rough Riders
1970	16	Saskatchewan Roughriders (14–2)	14	Hamilton Tiger-Cats (8–5–1)	58th	Montreal Alouettes
1971	16	Calgary Stampeders (9–6–1)	14	Toronto Argonauts (10–4)	59th	Calgary Stampeders
1972	16	Winnipeg Blue Bombers (10–6)	14	Hamilton Tiger-Cats (11–3)	60th	Hamilton Tiger-Cats
1973	16	Edmonton Eskimos (9–5–2)	14	Ottawa Rough Riders (9–5)	61st	Ottawa Rough Riders
1974	16	Edmonton Eskimos (10–5–1)	16	Montreal Alouettes (9–5–2)	62nd	Montreal Alouettes
1975	16	Edmonton Eskimos (12–4)	16	Ottawa Rough Riders (10–5–1)	63rd	Edmonton Eskimos
1976	16	Saskatchewan Roughriders (11–5)	16	Ottawa Rough Riders (9–6–1)	64th	Ottawa Rough Riders
1977	16	Edmonton Eskimos (10–6)	16	Montreal Alouettes (11–5)	65th	Montreal Alouettes
1978	16	Edmonton Eskimos (10–4–2)	16	Ottawa Rough Riders (11–5)	66th	Edmonton Eskimos
1979	16	Edmonton Eskimos (12–2–2)	16	Montreal Alouettes (11–4–1)	67th	Edmonton Eskimos
1980	16	Edmonton Eskimos (13–3)	16	Hamilton Tiger-Cats (8–7–1)	68th	Edmonton Eskimos
1981	16	Edmonton Eskimos (14–1–1)	16	Hamilton Tiger-Cats (11–4–1)	69th	Edmonton Eskimos
1982	16	Edmonton Eskimos (11–5)	16	Toronto Argonauts (9–6–1)	70th	Edmonton Eskimos
1983	16	BC Lions (11–5)	16	Toronto Argonauts (12–4)	71st	Toronto Argonauts
1984	16	BC Lions (12–3–1)	16	Toronto Argonauts (9–6–1)	72nd	Winnipeg Blue Bombers
1985	16	BC Lions (13–3)	16	Hamilton Tiger-Cats (8–8)	73rd	BC Lions
1986	18	Edmonton Eskimos (13–4–1)	18	Toronto Argonauts (10–8)	74th	Hamilton Tiger-Cats

=== Current era (1987–present) ===
Since 1987, the number of teams has changed several times, but the CFL has retained an 18-game schedule. Since 2014, the CFL includes nine teams in the same cities as it had from 1958 to 1986.

Season	Teams	West top record	East top record	Grey Cup	
Season	Teams	West top record	East top record	No.	Champion
1987	8	BC Lions (12–6)	Winnipeg Blue Bombers (12–6)	75th	Edmonton Eskimos
1988	8	Edmonton Eskimos (11–7)	Toronto Argonauts (14–4)	76th	Winnipeg Blue Bombers
1989	8	Edmonton Eskimos (16–2)	Hamilton Tiger-Cats (12–6)	77th	Saskatchewan Roughriders
1990	8	Calgary Stampeders (11–6–1)	Winnipeg Blue Bombers (12–6)	78th	Winnipeg Blue Bombers
1991	8	Edmonton Eskimos (12–6)	Toronto Argonauts (13–5)	79th	Toronto Argonauts
1992	8	Calgary Stampeders (13–5)	Winnipeg Blue Bombers (11–7)	80th	Calgary Stampeders
1993	9	Calgary Stampeders (15–3)	Winnipeg Blue Bombers (14–4)	81st	Edmonton Eskimos
1994	12	Calgary Stampeders (15–3)	Winnipeg Blue Bombers (13–5)	82nd	BC Lions
Season	Teams	North top record	South top record	Grey Cup	
Season	Teams	North top record	South top record	No.	Champion
1995	13	Calgary Stampeders (15–3)	Baltimore Stallions (15–3)	83rd	Baltimore Stallions
Season	Teams	West top record	East top record	Grey Cup	
Season	Teams	West top record	East top record	No.	Champion
1996	9	Calgary Stampeders (13–5)	Toronto Argonauts (15–3)	84th	Toronto Argonauts
1997	8	Edmonton Eskimos (12–6)	Toronto Argonauts (15–3)	85th	Toronto Argonauts
1998	8	Calgary Stampeders (12–6)	Hamilton Tiger-Cats (12–5–1)	86th	Calgary Stampeders
1999	8	BC Lions (13–5)	Montreal Alouettes (12–6)	87th	Hamilton Tiger-Cats
2000	8	Calgary Stampeders (12–5–1)	Montreal Alouettes (12–6)	88th	BC Lions
2001	8	Edmonton Eskimos (9–9)	Winnipeg Blue Bombers (14–4)	89th	Calgary Stampeders
2002	9	Edmonton Eskimos (13–5)	Montreal Alouettes (13–5)	90th	Montreal Alouettes
2003	9	Edmonton Eskimos (13–5)	Montreal Alouettes (13–5)	91st	Edmonton Eskimos
2004	9	BC Lions (13–5)	Montreal Alouettes (14–4)	92nd	Toronto Argonauts
2005	9	BC Lions (12–6)	Toronto Argonauts (11–7)	93rd	Edmonton Eskimos
2006	8	BC Lions (13–5)	Montreal Alouettes (10–8)	94th	BC Lions
2007	8	BC Lions (14–3–1)	Toronto Argonauts (11–7)	95th	Saskatchewan Roughriders
2008	8	Calgary Stampeders (13–5)	Montreal Alouettes (11–7)	96th	Calgary Stampeders
2009	8	Saskatchewan Roughriders (10–7–1)	Montreal Alouettes (15–3)	97th	Montreal Alouettes
2010	8	Calgary Stampeders (13–5)	Montreal Alouettes (12–6)	98th	Montreal Alouettes
2011	8	BC Lions (11–7)	Winnipeg Blue Bombers (10–8)	99th	BC Lions
2012	8	BC Lions (13–5)	Montreal Alouettes (11–7)	100th	Toronto Argonauts
2013	8	Calgary Stampeders (14–4)	Toronto Argonauts (11–7)	101st	Saskatchewan Roughriders
2014	9	Calgary Stampeders (15–3)	Hamilton Tiger-Cats (9–9)	102nd	Calgary Stampeders
2015	9	Edmonton Eskimos (14–4)	Ottawa Redblacks (12–6)	103rd	Edmonton Eskimos
2016	9	Calgary Stampeders (15–2–1)	Ottawa Redblacks (8–9–1)	104th	Ottawa Redblacks
2017	9	Calgary Stampeders (13–4–1)	Toronto Argonauts (9–9)	105th	Toronto Argonauts
2018	9	Calgary Stampeders (13–5)	Ottawa Redblacks (11–7)	106th	Calgary Stampeders
2019	9	Saskatchewan Roughriders (13–5)	Hamilton Tiger-Cats (15–3)	107th	Winnipeg Blue Bombers
~~2020~~	9	Cancelled due to the COVID-19 pandemic in Canada			
2021 (Note: 14-game season due to the COVID-19 pandemic in Canada)	9	Winnipeg Blue Bombers (11–3)	Toronto Argonauts (9–5)	108th	Winnipeg Blue Bombers
2022	9	Winnipeg Blue Bombers (15–3)	Toronto Argonauts (11–7)	109th	Toronto Argonauts
2023	9	Winnipeg Blue Bombers (14–4)	Toronto Argonauts (16–2)	110th	Montreal Alouettes
2024	9	Winnipeg Blue Bombers (11–7)	Montreal Alouettes (12–5–1)	111th	Toronto Argonauts
2025	9	Saskatchewan Roughriders (12–6)	Hamilton Tiger-Cats (11–7)	112th	Saskatchewan Roughriders
2026	9	Edmonton Elks (13–5)	Montreal Alouettes (14–4)	113th	Edmonton Elks
2027	9			114th	
