= 1884 Dominion Championship =

1884 Canadian rugby football championship

Montreal Football Club	Toronto Football Club
(3–0)	(4–0)
30	0
	1	2	Total
Montreal Football Club	14	16	30
Toronto Football Club	0	0	0
- Date: November 6, 1884
- Stadium: University Lawn (University of Toronto)
- Location: Toronto, Ontario
- Referee: P. M. Bankier
- Attendance: 1,500

The 1884 Rugby Football Championship of the Dominion was a Canadian football game that determined the Senior Rugby Football champion of Canada for the 1884 season. The game was played on Thanksgiving Day on November 6, 1884 on the University lawn at the University of Toronto in Toronto, Ontario. The Quebec Rugby Football Union (QRFU) champion Montreal Football Club defeated the Ontario Rugby Football Union (ORFU) champion Toronto Football Club with a 30–0 victory in the first ever game to decide a national champion, as directed by the Canadian Rugby Football Union.

== Background ==
The QRFU and the ORFU had been formed in 1883 to organize play in their provincial jurisdictions. In the following year, on February 7, 1884, the Canadian Rugby Football Union was formed to provide a regulatory body for Rugby Football in Canada along with establishing a national championship game. This game was established to determine a champion between the Quebec and Ontario challenge cup champions.

=== Toronto Football Club ===
The Toronto Football Club had won the ORFU Challenge Cup in 1883 and repeated as Ontario champions in 1884 after posting victories over Peterborough, University of Toronto, Hamilton, and Ottawa. The Toronto club wore maroon jerseys with white pants in the championship game.

=== Montreal Football Club ===
The Montreal Football Club had also won their provincial championship in 1883 and also repeated as champions in 1884 after defeating Britannia, Kingston, and McGill. The Montreal team wore red and black barred jerseys with white pants in this game.

== Game summary ==
Montreal won the coin toss and elected to play down field and with the wind in the first half. The game kicked off at 3:20pm local time with Montreal establishing dominance early and moving the ball upfield to bring the ball within the Toronto ten-yard line. Unable to return a kick by Montreal's Stirling from their own end, Toronto gave up a rouge and Montreal led 1–0. Following the ensuing kickoff, Montreal moved the ball downfield again with Drummond returning a ball from the scrimmage past the Toronto goal line for a try (four points). The following kick at goal, from a difficult angle, was missed by Hodgson, keeping the score 5–0 for Montreal. On the next series, after Toronto's failed attempt to kick the ball upfield, Montreal brought the ball back downfield and Toronto was forced to concede a rouge again. It could have been worse as Cleghorn from Montreal had actually crossed the Toronto goal line but was ruled to have received the ball from a forward pass. On the next possession, Montreal re-gained the ball with Louson running downfield then making a pass to Cleghorn who ran across the Toronto line for a try. Stirling was successful on the kick at goal (four points), so Montreal added a total of eight points to bring the score to 14–0 where it remained until the end of the half.

In the second half, Toronto now had the wind advantage and optimism, but Aldwell muffed the ball on Montreal's kickoff. The ball was forced upfield toward Toronto's goal line until it finally crossed in the northwest corner of the field where Stirling jumped on the ball and scored the try for Montreal. Hodgson missed the long kick at goal with the wind playing a factor and the score was then 18–0. Toronto's McCallum returned the ball near midfield, but following a scrimmage, Montreal's G. L. Cains returned the ball the other way and after passing to Cleghorn, he continued the charge. Toronto was able to get the ball back and, after a series of passes, the ball was returned to midfield by Aldwell before being tackled by Montreal's F. L. Cains. After several scrimmages in the middle of the field, Toronto kicked the ball which went directly to Montreal's Drummond. It was then placed for a kick at goal attempt by R. Campbell, who missed, and the ball was recovered by Toronto's Aldwell in goal. He attempted to kick the ball back out, but it deflected off of the goal post and was recovered in goal by Montreal's Stirling who scored the try as well as the ensuing kick conversion to bring the score to 26–0.

Following the kickoff, Toronto's Maclennan returned the ball downfield with McCallum effectively dribbling the ball then running with it toward Montreal's end. McCallum then drop kicked the ball into Montreal's territory, but they soon showed their dominance again. Montreal's Cleghorn brought the ball back on an effective run to midfield where it was recovered by Drummond who returned the ball all the way to Toronto's goal line where he touched down for the try. Stirling missed the kick at goal and the score became 30–0 where the game was called shortly thereafter.

=== Gameday lineups ===
Montreal	Position	Toronto
W. Hodgson	Backs	Maclennan
A. D. Fry	Backs	Macfarlane
H. R. Drummond	Halfbacks	L. Aldwell
A. E. Abbott	Halfbacks	Muntz
W. R. Miller	Quarters	O. Morphy
R. Stirling	Quarters	Torrance
R. Campbell (C)	Forwards	E. Hume Blake (C)
A. J. Campbell	Forwards	A. H. Vankoughnet
G. L. Cains	Forwards	V. Armstrong
F. L. Cains	Forwards	J. McAndrew
W. Cleghorn	Forwards	J. McCallum
J. Louson	Forwards	F. W. Thomas
J. Fulton	Forwards	A. B. Cameron
J. H. Rodgers	Forwards	W. L. Marsh
P. Barton	Forwards	A. J. Boyd
