= 1906 Dominion Championship =

Hamilton Tigers	McGill
(6–0)	(4–2)
29	3
	1	2	3	4	Total
Hamilton Tigers	14	12	2	1	29
McGill	0	2	0	1	3
- Date: December 1, 1906
- Location: McGill University; Montreal, Quebec
- Referee: W.B. Hendry
- Attendance: 2,000

The 1906 Dominion Championship was a Canadian football game that was played on December 1, 1906, between the Hamilton Tigers and the McGill University Seniors, that determined the Senior Rugby Football champion of Canada. The Ontario Rugby Football Union champion Tigers defeated the Canadian Intercollegiate Rugby Football Union champion McGill squad 29–3 to their first Dominion Championship. This was the second appearance in the title game for the Tigers with the first coming in 1897. This was the first and only appearance of a McGill team in the Dominion Championship game.

== Background ==
In 1905, the Tigers refused to travel to the home of the Quebec Rugby Football Union (QRFU) champion Ottawa Rough Riders that year and were banned by the Canadian Rugby Union (CRU) from playing in the Dominion Championship despite having a perfect record. In 1906, the CRU stated that if the Tigers wanted to qualify for the Dominion Final, they would have to defeat the 1906 QRFU champion Montreal Club by Quebec rules and the 1906 CIRFU champion McGill University club by college rules. At the time, the ORFU played with Burnside rules. Despite these challenges, Hamilton defeated Montreal 11–6 in the Dominion Semi-Final before dominating the Dominion Final against McGill and coasting to a 29–3 victory.
