= 1906 in Canadian football =

The 1906 Canadian football season was the 15th season of organized play since the Canadian Rugby Union (CRU) was founded in 1892 and the 24th season since the creation of the Ontario Rugby Football Union (ORFU) and the Quebec Rugby Football Union (QRFU) in 1883. The season concluded with the Hamilton Tigers defeating the McGill University Seniors in the 1906 Dominion Championship game.

== Canadian football news in 1906 ==
Specifications were first made for the size of football, where the ball had to be 11 inches long, 23 inches in circumference and 13 3/4 ounces in weight.

Goals from the Field and Free Kicks were increased to four points in the ORFU. Games were four 15-minute quarters in length. CIRFU lowered Goals from the Field to four points and Free Kicks to three points. Calgary City Rugby Football Club was formed March 14 at Calgary City Hall.

The Manitoba Rugby Football Union saw the four teams play an unbalanced schedule. Each team could earn a maximum of 30 points on the season. The value for a win was determined by the formula (30 divided by number of games scheduled). The Winnipeg Football Club was awarded 5 points per win; the Winnipeg Rowing Club and the St.John's Rugby Football Club were awarded 6 points per win and the Brandon Football Club was awarded 7.5 points per win.

The Winnipeg Rugby Football Club had difficulty getting a full team to show up to games and they folded midway through the season. The Winnipeg Rugby Football Club defaulted one game to each of the other teams. The final game of the season between the Rowing Club and the St.John's was not played as the Winnipeg Rowing Club had already been crowned as champions.

== Regular season ==
=== Final regular season standings ===
Note: GP = Games Played, W = Wins, L = Losses, T = Ties, PF = Points For, PA = Points Against, Pts = Points

**Ontario Rugby Football Union**
| Team | GP | W | L | T | PF | PA | Pts |
|---|---|---|---|---|---|---|---|
| **Hamilton Tigers** | 6 | 5 | 1 | 0 | 169 | 34 | 10 |
| Toronto Argonauts | 6 | 4 | 2 | 0 | 129 | 51 | 8 |
| Toronto Victorias | 6 | 2 | 3 | 1 | 29 | 110 | 5 |
| Peterborough Pets | 6 | 0 | 5 | 1 | 38 | 170 | 1 |

Quebec Rugby Football Union
| Team | GP | W | L | T | PF | PA | Pts |
|---|---|---|---|---|---|---|---|
| **Montreal Football Club** | 6 | 6 | 0 | 0 | 211 | 22 | 12 |
| Ottawa Rough Riders | 6 | 4 | 2 | 0 | 75 | 49 | 8 |
| St. Patrick's College | 6 | 1 | 5 | 0 | 45 | 169 | 2 |
| Montreal Westmounts | 6 | 1 | 5 | 0 | 43 | 134 | 2 |

**Intercollegiate Rugby Football Union**
| Team | GP | W | L | T | PF | PA | Pts |
|---|---|---|---|---|---|---|---|
| **McGill** | 6 | 4 | 2 | 0 | 97 | 72 | 8 |
| Toronto | 6 | 3 | 3 | 0 | 74 | 36 | 6 |
| Ottawa | 6 | 3 | 3 | 0 | 42 | 110 | 6 |
| Queen's | 6 | 2 | 4 | 0 | 89 | 84 | 4 |

*Bold text means that they have clinched the playoffs

Manitoba Rugby Football Union
| Team | GP | W | L | T | PF | PA | Pts |
|---|---|---|---|---|---|---|---|
| Winnipeg Rowing Club | 4 | 4 | 0 | 0 | 59 | 7 | 24 |
| Brandon Football Club | 4 | 3 | 1 | 0 | 19 | 31 | 22.5 |
| St.John's Rugby Football Club | 4 | 1 | 3 | 0 | 8 | 52 | 6 |
| Winnipeg Rugby Football Club | 6 | 1 | 5 | 0 | 26 | 22 | 5 |

== League Champions ==
| Football Union | League Champion |
|---|---|
| CIRFU | McGill University |
| ORFU | Hamilton Tigers |
| QRFU | Montreal Football Club |
| MRFU | Winnipeg Football Club |

== Playoffs ==
=== Dominion Semi-Final ===
| Away | Home |
|---|---|
| Hamilton Tigers 11 | Montreal Football Club 6 |

- Hamilton advances to the Dominion Championship.

== Dominion Championship ==
December 1 1906 Dominion Championship Game: McGill University - Montreal, Quebec
| Hamilton Tigers 29 | McGill 3 |
Hamilton Tigers are the 1906 Dominion Champions
