= 1905 Dominion Championship =

| Ottawa Rough Riders | Toronto Varsity |
|---|---|
| (6–0) | (6–0) |
| 9 | 11 |
| | 1 | 2 | 3 | 4 | Total |
|---|---|---|---|---|---|
| Ottawa Rough Riders | 7 | 0 | 2 | 0 | 9 |
| Toronto Varsity | 1 | 4 | 0 | 6 | 11 |
- Date: November 25, 1905
- Stadium: Rosedale Field
- Location: Toronto, Ontario
- Referee: Herbert Molson (1st half); Dr. G. Dalton (2nd half)
- Attendance: 7,000

The 1905 Dominion Championship was a Canadian football game that was played on November 25, 1905 at Rosedale Field in Toronto, Ontario that determined the Senior Rugby Football champion of Canada for the 1905 season. The Canadian Intercollegiate Rugby Football Union (CIRFU) champion Toronto University team defeated the Quebec Rugby Football Union (QRFU) champion Ottawa Rough Riders in an 11–9 comeback victory to win their second Dominion Championship. This was the third appearance in the title game for Varsity and the fourth appearance for the Rough Riders while also being their first loss in the championship game.

== Background ==
This was the first national championship game played since 1902 since there had been disputes for the previous two years as to which rules to play under. The Ontario Rugby Football Union (ORFU) champion Hamilton Tigers finished their season with a 6–0 record and challenged the Rough Riders for the Dominion Championship. However, the Tigers did not want to travel to Ottawa to play the game and the Rough Riders did not want to go to Hamilton, so the Canadian Rugby Union (CRU) banned the Tigers from playing in the game (the Tigers also played with Burnside rules whereas the Rough Riders played with traditional rugby-style rules). With a third straight year of cancellations looming, the CRU reached a rules compromise with this game whereby the first half of the game would be played under QRFU rules and the second half would be played under CIRFU rules. The differences were primarily scoring-based, with tries worth four points and goal worth two points in the QRFU and tries being worth five points and goals being worth one point in the CIRFU. Additionally, in the first half, teams needed to gain five yards on third down while in the second half, teams needed 10 yards.
