= 1884 in Canadian football =

The following is an overview of the events of 1884 in Canadian football, primarily focusing on the senior teams that played in this era. This includes news, standings, playoff games, and championships. This was the second season since the creation of the Ontario Rugby Football Union (ORFU) and the Quebec Rugby Football Union (QRFU) in 1883 and the first since the re-establishment of the Canadian Rugby Football Union (CRFU). The season was highlighted by the first ever Rugby Football Dominion Championship where the Montreal Football Club defeated the Toronto Football Club by a score of 30 to 0.

== Canadian football news in 1884 ==
On February 7, 1884, the Canadian Rugby Football Union was formed to provide a regulatory body for Rugby Football in Canada along with establishing a national championship game. The QRFU adopted a point based system this year, adopting the ORFU model, as opposed to the previous year where they recorded the number of tries and goals scored.

== QRFU results ==
QRFU First Round
October 11, 1884 - Montreal, Quebec
Montreal Football Club	14–2	Britannia Football Club
October 11, 1884 - Lennoxville, Quebec
McGill College	50–0	Bishop's College

QRFU Second Round
October 18, 1884 - Montreal, Quebec
Montreal Football Club	21–0	McGill College

QRFU Friendly
October 25, 1884 - Montreal, Quebec
Britannia Football Club	16–0	McGill College

=== Quebec Challenge Cup ===
The Montreal Football Club and the Britannia Football Club played for the Quebec Challenge Cup. The teams proved evenly matched with Montreal only scoring one rouge in the entire game while the Brits did not score. Since Montreal did not record enough points, the game ended in a draw. Because Britannia was not able to defeat Montreal, Montreal retained their Quebec title and were declared the champions of Quebec.

QRFU Final
November 1, 1884 - Montreal, Quebec
Montreal Football Club	1–0	Britannia Football Club
Montreal retains the QRFU championship by draw

== ORFU results ==
At the beginning of the season, 14 Ontario rugby clubs were eligible to compete for the Ontario Challenge Cup. Five of these clubs either did not participate or forfeited immediately. The remaining nine teams competed in a series of sudden death matches until one undefeated team remained, being named the Ontario Rugby Challenge Cup champion.

ORFU First Round
October 11, 1884 - Strathroy, Ontario
Strathroy Football Club	20–2	London Football Club
October 11, 1884 - Peterborough, Ontario
Toronto Football Club	29–8	Peterborough Football Club
October 11, 1884 - Kingston, Ontario
Kingston, Queen's	4–0	Kingston, R. M. C.
Did not play, advanced to second round
Ottawa Football Club	1–0	Kingston Football Club (defaulted)
Hamilton Football Club	Bye	
Toronto University	Bye	

ORFU Second Round
October 18, 1884 - Hamilton, Ontario
Hamilton Football Club	6–4	Strathroy Football Club
October 18, 1884 - Toronto, Ontario
Toronto Football Club	24–0	Toronto University
October 19, 1884 - Ottawa, Ontario
Ottawa Football Club	19–7	Kingston, Queen's

ORFU Third Round
October 25, 1884 - Hamilton, Ontario
Toronto Football Club	24–4	Hamilton Football Club
Ottawa Football Club	Bye	

=== Ontario Challenge Cup ===
Prior to the scheduled final between Toronto and Ottawa, Ottawa declared forfeit due to seven of their players being unable to make the trip to Toronto. Given the short notice, since the Toronto club received the telegram one day before the scheduled match, the integrity of the Ottawa club was questioned since they had at least 35 members and appeared reluctant to send a replacement team that would only lose. Since tickets had been paid for, Toronto attempted to schedule a match with Hamilton, but were refused due to the justifiably short notice. Consequently, the Toronto Football Club were Ontario Challenge Cup champions due to Ottawa's forfeit.

ORFU Final
Scheduled for November 1, 1884 - Toronto, Ontario
Toronto Football Club	1–0	Ottawa Football Club (defaulted)
Toronto won the ORFU championship by forfeit

== Dominion Championship ==
1884 Dominion Championship
November 6, 1884 - University of Toronto Lawn - Toronto, Ontario
Montreal Football Club	30–0	Toronto Football Club
Montreal won the first ever Canadian Dominion Football Championship
