= 1905 in Canadian football =

The 1905 Canadian football season was the 14th season of organized play since the Canadian Rugby Union (CRU) was founded in 1892 and the 23rd season since the creation of the Ontario Rugby Football Union (ORFU) and the Quebec Rugby Football Union (QRFU) in 1883. The season concluded with the Toronto University team defeating the Ottawa Rough Riders in the 1905 Dominion Championship game.

== Canadian football news in 1905 ==
The Intercollegiate and Quebec Unions refused the Burnside Rules. For championship games, the CRU ruled the teams would use QRFU rules for the first half and the intercollegiate rules for the second half.

QRFU moved to four 15-minute quarters; Tries worth five points and Goals from Tries worth one point. CIRFU adopted 10-yard rule for three downs and the ORFU gave captains the option of playing four 15-minute quarters. Goals from the Field were increased to three points and the Fair Catch rule was replaced by a three-yard Punt Return rule.

The Toronto Football Club merged with the Toronto Argonauts in 1905, with W. A. Hewitt serving as manager. He also served as vice-president of the ORFU for the 1905 and 1906 seasons, and sought for uniform rules of play with the CRU, with a preference for the snap-back system of play used in Ontario.

== Regular season ==
=== Final regular season standings ===
Note: GP = Games played, W = Wins, L = Losses, T = Ties, PF = Points for, PA = Points against, Pts = Points

**Ontario Rugby Football Union**
Team	GP	W	L	T	PF	PA	Pts
**Hamilton Tigers**	6	6	0	0	248	23	12
Toronto Argonauts	6	4	2	0	67	74	8
Toronto Victorias	6	2	4	0	11	127	4
London Kickers	6	0	6	0	6	108	0

Quebec Rugby Football Union
Team	GP	W	L	T	PF	PA	Pts
**Ottawa Rough Riders**	6	6	0	0	126	36	12
Montreal Football Club	6	4	2	0	87	50	8
Montreal Westmounts	6	1	5	0	55	98	2
St. Patrick's College	6	1	5	0	40	124	2

**Intercollegiate Rugby Football Union**
Team	GP	W	L	T	PF	PA	Pts
**Toronto**	6	6	0	0	63	43	12
McGill	6	2	2	2	91	71	6
Ottawa	6	1	4	1	68	98	3
Queen's	6	1	4	1	75	105	3

Bold text means that they had clinched the playoffs.

Manitoba Rugby Football Union
Team	GP	W	L	T	PF	PA	Pts
Winnipeg Rowing Club	3	3	0	0	76	7	6
Winnipeg Rugby Football Club	3	2	1	0	28	23	4
Winnipeg Shamrocks	2	0	2	0	14	41	0
St.John's Rugby Football Club	2	0	2	0	3	50	0

== League Champions ==
Football Union	League Champion
CIRFU	University of Toronto
ORFU	Hamilton Tigers
QRFU	Ottawa Rough Riders
MRFU	Winnipeg Rowing Club

== Playoffs ==
- The ORFU champion Hamilton Tigers refused to play in Ottawa for the Dominion Semi-Final, so they were banned from the championship final by the CRU.

== Dominion Championship ==
November 25 1905 Dominion Championship Game: Rosedale Field - Toronto, Ontario
Ottawa Rough Riders 9	Toronto Varsity 11
Toronto Varsity were the 1905 Dominion Champions.
