= 1902 Dominion Championship =

Canadian football game

Ottawa Rough Riders	Ottawa College
(2–0)	(6–0)
5	0
	1	2	Total
Ottawa Rough Riders	5	0	5
Ottawa College	0	0	0
- Date: November 15, 1902
- Stadium: Ottawa College Grounds
- Location: Toronto, Ontario
- Referee: N. Lash
- Attendance: 6,000

The 1902 Dominion Championship was a Canadian football game that was played on November 15, 1902 at the Ottawa College Grounds in Ottawa, Ontario that determined the Senior Rugby Football champion of Canada for the 1902 season. The Ontario Rugby Football Union (ORFU) champion Ottawa Rough Riders defeated the Quebec Rugby Football Union (QRFU) champion, and defending national champion, Ottawa College in a 5–0 victory to win their third Dominion Championship. This was a re-match of the 1898 Dominion Championship game which the Rough Riders also won on the Ottawa College Grounds. The Rough Riders made their third appearance in the title game, all within five years, and it was the seventh appearance for Ottawa College with their only losses in the game coming from the Rough Riders.

== Background ==
This was the last national championship game to be played with 15 players for each team on the field as rule changes took place after this season, reducing that number to 14 in some unions and to 12 in others. It was also the last game to be played in just two halves and not four quarters. Rule changes to the game of rugby football became inconsistent between the ORFU, QRFU, and Canadian Intercollegiate Rugby Football Union (CIRFU) which led to disputes that ultimately resulted in the cancellation of future championship games until one was finally played again in 1905. The Rough Riders were favoured 2 to 1 to win the game, with even bets to double Ottawa College's score.

== Game summary ==
The Rough Riders won the toss and chose the north goal since there was a slight wind advantage playing from that side. Hal Walters opened the scoring after receiving a throw-in which he punted to touch-in-goal where he scored one point for the Rough Riders. This was the Rough Riders' first point to be scored in a first half all year, although the club had only played two other games, both against the Toronto Argonauts, due to the withdrawal of the Hamilton Tigers. Later in the first half, following a muffed punt return by Ottawa College's O'Brien, Walters received a pass from Jim McGee and was able to run over the goal line for a touchdown, making the score 5–0 in favour of the Rough Riders. The convert attempt failed, so the score total remained at five. In the second half, Ottawa College had the wind advantage, but the Rough Riders focused on retaining possession of the ball and College was unable to score. It was estimated that the Rough Riders had possession of the ball 80% of the time while Hal Walters himself had the ball 60% of the time. The strategy by the Rough Riders proved successful as they maintained their lead and won their third Canadian Dominion Championship.
