= Brockville Football Club =

General information
- Founded: 1899; 127 years ago
- Folded: 1902; 124 years ago
- Headquartered: Brockville, Ontario, Canada
- Colours: Unknown

League / conference affiliations
- Quebec Rugby Football Union

The Brockville Football Club was a team that played in the QRFU at the turn of the 20th century. They had great success early on in their history. In 1899, they finished in first place in the QRFU but lost to Ottawa College in the Quebec finals. They won the QRFU Championship in 1900 but lost in the Dominion Final to the Ottawa Rough Riders.

== QRFU season-by-season ==
Season	G	W	L	T	PF	PA	Finish	Playoffs
1899	6	4	2	0	82	20	1st	Lost to Ottawa College, 11-9, in the QRFU final
1900	6	6	0	0	171	16	1st	QRFU champion, lost to Ottawa Rough Riders, 17-10 in Dominion Championship
1901	6	3	3	0	48	65	3rd	
