= 1885 in Canadian football =

The following is an overview of the events of 1885 in Canadian football, primarily focusing on the senior teams that played in this era. This includes news, standings, playoff games, and championships. This was the third season since the creation of the Ontario Rugby Football Union (ORFU) and the Quebec Rugby Football Union (QRFU) and the second since the re-establishment of the Canadian Rugby Football Union (CRFU).

== Canadian football news in 1885 ==
In this season, the Canadian Rugby Football Union (CRFU) established a standard field size of 100 yards long by 65 yards wide.

=== Final regular season standings ===
Note: GP = Games Played, W = Wins, L = Losses, T = Ties, PF = Points For, PA = Points Against, Pts = Points

Quebec Rugby Football Union
Team	GP	W	L	T	PF	PA	Pts
Montreal Foot-Ball Club	2	2	0	0	62	0	4
McGill University	2	1	1	0	24	50	2
Britannia Football Club	1	0	1	0	0	16	0
Bishop's College	2	0	2	0	4	24	0

*Bold text means that they have clinched the playoffs

== League Champions ==
Football Union	League Champion
ORFU	Ottawa College
QRFU	Montreal Foot-Ball Club

== Playoffs ==
=== QRFU Final ===
**no QRFU Final**

=== ORFU Final Tie game ===
**ORFU Final**
**Ottawa College 21**	Ottawa Football Club 3

== Dominion Championship ==
November 12 1885 Dominion Championship Game: University of Toronto Lawn - Toronto, Ontario
**QRFU All-Stars 3**	ORFU All-Stars 0
