= 1902 in Canadian football =

== Canadian Football News in 1902 ==
The Hamilton Tigers ceased operations after one game, citing poor player turnout and a lack of ticket revenue. Consequently, Toronto Argonauts and Ottawa Rough Riders were the only two teams to play in the Ontario Rugby Football Union this season.

== Regular season ==
=== Final regular season standings ===
Note: GP = Games Played, W = Wins, L = Losses, T = Ties, PF = Points For, PA = Points Against, Pts = Points

**Ontario Rugby Football Union**
Team	GP	W	L	T	PF	PA	Pts
**Ottawa Rough Riders**	2	2	0	0	29	4	4
Toronto Argonauts	3	1	2	0	21	32	2
Hamilton Tigers	1	0	1	0	3	17	0

Quebec Rugby Football Union
Team	GP	W	L	T	PF	PA	Pts
**University of Ottawa**	6	6	0	0	126	12	12
Brockville Football Club	6	2	4	0	58	76	4
Montreal Football Club	6	2	4	0	38	85	4
Britannia Football Club	6	2	4	0	28	77	4

**Intercollegiate Rugby Football Union**
Team	GP	W	L	T	Pts
McGill Redmen	4	2	1	1	5
Varsity Blues	4	2	2	0	4
Queen's University	4	1	2	1	3

*Bold text means that they have clinched the playoffs

Manitoba Rugby Football Union
Team	GP	W	L	T	PF	PA	Pts
Winnipeg Rowing Club	4	4	0	0	52	12	8
Winnipeg Rugby Football Club	4	2	2	0	36	45	4
St.John's Rugby Football Club	4	0	4	0	37	68	0

== League Champions ==
Football Union	League Champion
CIRFU	McGill University
ORFU	Ottawa Rough Riders
QRFU	Ottawa College
MRFU	Winnipeg Rowing Club

== Playoffs ==
=== Dominion Championship ===
November 15 1902 Dominion Championship Game: Ottawa College Grounds - Ottawa, Ontario
Ottawa Rough Riders 5	Ottawa College 0
Ottawa Rough Riders are the 1902 Dominion Champions
