= 1887 in Canadian football =

The following is an overview of the events of 1887 in Canadian football, primarily focusing on the senior teams that played in this era. This includes news, standings, playoff games, and championships. This was the fifth season since the creation of the Ontario Rugby Football Union (ORFU) and the Quebec Rugby Football Union (QRFU).

== Canadian Football News in 1887 ==
The ORFU withdrew from the Canadian Rugby Football Union (CRFU) and the governing body ceased to function. The St.John's Rugby Football Club (St.John's) formed in October 1887. The St. John's team met the Winnipeg Football Club (Winnipegs) to determine the first ever Manitoba champions. After splitting the first two games, a third game was scheduled to determine the winner. The Winnipegs won by a goal and a try to nil. All games were scored using the challenge system which credited the team with the most goals as the winner. The games were unofficially scored using the points system used by the CRU in eastern Canada. Based on the points system, the Winnipegs won all three games.

=== Final regular season standings ===
Note: GP = Games Played, W = Wins, L = Losses, T = Ties, PF = Points For, PA = Points Against, Pts = Points

Quebec Rugby Football Union
Team	GP	W	L	T	PF	PA	Pts
Montreal Football Club	2	2	0	0	52	15	4
McGill University	2	1	1	0	8	23	2
Britannia Football Club	1	0	1	0	15	33	0
St. George's College	1	0	1	0	4	8	0

*Bold text means that they have clinched the playoffs

== League Champions ==
Football Union	League Champion
ORFU	Ottawa College
QRFU	Montreal Football Club

== Playoffs ==
=== QRFU Final ===
QRFU Final
Montreal Football Club 19	McGill University 0

=== ORFU City Final ===
ORFU Final
Hamilton Tigers 13	Ottawa Football Club 1

=== ORFU College Final ===
ORFU Final
Ottawa College 9	University of Toronto 0

=== ORFU Final ===
ORFU Final
Ottawa College 15	Hamilton Tigers 0

== Dominion Championship ==
November 5 1887 Dominion Championship Game: McGill Stadium - Montreal, Quebec
Ottawa College 10	Montreal Football Club 5
