= 1886 in Canadian football =

The following is an overview of the events of 1886 in Canadian football, primarily focusing on the senior teams that played in this era. This includes news, standings, playoff games, and championships. This was the fourth season since the creation of the Ontario Rugby Football Union (ORFU) and the Quebec Rugby Football Union (QRFU) and the second since the re-establishment of the Canadian Rugby Football Union (CRFU).

== Canadian Football News in 1886 ==
There was no Canadian championship this year. Initially, the Canadian Rugby Football Union (CRFU) had scheduled a second consecutive All-Star game to be played in Montreal on November 18, 1886. However, the ORFU was opposed and preferred a championship game between their champions and the champions of the QRFU. Additionally, the ORFU was disputing a proposed rule change that would allow for passing the ball back through the scrimmage, which was a significant deviation from rugby football. Consequently, the ORFU informed the QRFU winners, the Montreal Football Club, via telegram on November 15, that they would not be sending a team. At the CRFU annual meeting on November 18, the aforementioned rule change was adopted.

=== Final regular season standings ===
Note: GP = Games Played, W = Wins, L = Losses, T = Ties, PF = Points For, PA = Points Against, Pts = Points

Quebec Rugby Football Union
Team	GP	W	L	T	PF	PA	Pts
Montreal Football Club	2	2	0	0	27	6	4
Britannia Football Club	2	1	1	0	22	15	2
McGill University	2	0	2	0	9	37	0

*Bold text means that they have clinched the playoffs

== League Champions ==
Football Union	League Champion
ORFU	Ottawa College
QRFU	Montreal Football Club

== Playoffs ==
=== QRFU Final ===
No QRFU Final

=== ORFU Final ===
ORFU Final
Ottawa College 13	Toronto Football Club 0

== Dominion Championship ==
No dominion championship was played.
