= Football Association of Canada =

The Football Association of Canada may refer to...

- Canadian Soccer Association, known as the Football Association of Canada from 1952 to 1958.
- Football Canada, the governing body for Canadian gridiron football.
