= Football Ontario =

- Type: Provincial Sport Organization
- Headquarters: Guelph, Ontario
- Members: Paid by individual, team and/or league
- Official languages: English and French
- Executive Director: Aaron Geisler
- Website: ontariofootball.ca

Football Ontario, formerly known as the Ontario Football Alliance, is the official Provincial Sport Organization of Canadian football in the province of Ontario, based in Guelph. Football Ontario is also a member of Football Canada.
