= 1900 in Canadian football =

The following is an overview of the events of 1900 in Canadian football, primarily focusing on the senior teams that played in this era. This includes news, standings, playoff games, and championships.

== Canadian Football News in 1900 ==
The ORFU prohibited the use of CIRFU players and the CRU stated that players must block with their bodies and not hold opponents with their arms or hands.

== Regular season ==
=== Final regular season standings ===
Note: GP = Games Played, W = Wins, L = Losses, T = Ties, PF = Points For, PA = Points Against, Pts = Points

**Ontario Rugby Football Union**
Team	GP	W	L	T	PF	PA	Pts
**Ottawa Rough Riders**	6	4	2	0	89	26	8
**Toronto Argonauts**	6	4	2	0	82	42	8
Kingston Granites	6	3	3	0	26	71	6
Hamilton Tigers	6	1	5	0	32	90	2

Quebec Rugby Football Union
Team	GP	W	L	T	PF	PA	Pts
**Brockville Football Club**	6	6	0	0	171	16	12
Montreal Football Club	6	4	2	0	73	87	8
University of Ottawa	6	1	5	0	45	121	2
Britannia Football Club	6	1	5	0	41	106	2

**Intercollegiate Rugby Football Union**
Team	GP	W	L	T	Pts
McGill University	4	3	1	0	6
Queen's University	4	1	2	1	3
Toronto Varsity	4	1	2	1	3

*Bold text means that they have clinched the playoffs

Manitoba Rugby Football Union
Team	GP	W	L	T	PF	PA	Pts
Winnipeg Rugby Football Club	6	3	2	1	39	23	7
St.John's Rugby Football Club	6	2	3	1	23	39	5

== League Champions ==
Football Union	League Champion
CIRFU	Queen's
ORFU	Ottawa Rough Riders
QRFU	Brockville Football Club
MRFU	Winnipeg Rugby Football Club

== Playoffs ==
=== ORFU Playoff ===
Away	Home
Toronto Argonauts 12	Ottawa Rough Riders 20

- Ottawa advances to the Dominion Championship.

== Dominion Championship ==
November 24 1900 Dominion Championship Game: Rosedale Field - Toronto, Ontario
Brockville Football Club 10	Ottawa Rough Riders 17
Ottawa Rough Riders are the 1900 Dominion Champions
