= 1890 in Canadian football =

The following is an overview of the events of 1890 in Canadian football, primarily focusing on the senior teams that played in this era. This includes news, standings, playoff games, and championships. This was the eighth season since the creation of the Ontario Rugby Football Union (ORFU) and the Quebec Rugby Football Union (QRFU).

== Canadian Football News in 1890 ==
In the ORFU, the points awarded for a try were reduced from four points to two, which was implemented in some college games in the previous year. Since the 1889 champion Ottawa College team had retired from playing, all teams were in contention for the ORFU championship. The Hamilton Tigers and Queen's University qualified for the final, on neutral ground, in Toronto. The Tigers were leading 7–4 near the end of the game when the referee called time at 5:30pm due to darkness (The game had also started late). Queen's protested the decision to the ORFU and another match was scheduled despite Hamilton being awarded the cup. In the second game at Rosedale Field, the Tigers defeated Queen's 8–6.

After seven seasons of dominance by the Montreal Football Club and slumping fan attendance as a result of this, the QRFU executive committee changed the schedule to be more equitable. After Britannia lost to Montreal, they then played their second game to an 18–18 draw. In the next game, McGill University scored a try near the end of the game to deliver Montreal their first loss in the QRFU. McGill had thought they had won the Quebec title, but the QRFU executive announced that McGill would have to accept a challenge from the newly formed Victoria Football Club for the championship. Due to lack of experience, Victoria easily lost 41–0 and McGill won their first QRFU championship.

There was no Canadian Championship played this year.

=== Final regular season standings ===
Note: GP = Games Played, W = Wins, L = Losses, T = Ties, PF = Points For, PA = Points Against, Pts = Points

Quebec Rugby Football Union
Team	GP	W	L	T	PF	PA
McGill University	2	2	0	0	52	9
Montreal Football Club	3	1	1	1	46	38
Britannia Football Club	2	0	1	1	27	37
Victoria Football Club	1	0	1	0	0	41

*Bold text means that they have clinched the playoffs

== League Champions ==
Football Union	League Champion
ORFU	Hamilton Tigers
QRFU	McGill University
Northwest Championship	Winnipeg Rugby Football Club

== Playoffs ==
=== QRFU Final ===
QRFU Final
McGill University 41	Victoria Football Club 0
McGill University wins 1890 QRFU Championship

=== ORFU Semi-Final 1 ===
ORFU Semi-Final
Hamilton Tigers 40	Strathroy FC 1
Hamilton Tigers advance to the 1890 ORFU Championship

=== ORFU Semi-Final 2 ===
ORFU Semi-Final
Queen's University 29	University of Toronto 5
Queen's University advance to the 1890 ORFU Championship

=== ORFU Final ===
ORFU Final
Hamilton Tigers 8	Queen's University 6
Hamilton Tigers win 1890 ORFU Championship

== Dominion Championship ==
No dominion championship game was played.
