= 1901 in Canadian football =

== Canadian Football News in 1901 ==
The ORFU stated that all players must sign amateur cards. The CRU ruled that the ball was to be placed on the ground in line with the front foot of the Scrimmage before the lines could come together. John Thrift Meldrum Burnside's revised football rules were put into play in the University of Toronto Inter-faculty games, and later in the Mulock Cup championship games.

== Regular season ==
=== Final regular season standings ===
Note: GP = Games Played, W = Wins, L = Losses, T = Ties, PF = Points For, PA = Points Against, Pts = Points

**Ontario Rugby Football Union**
Team	GP	W	L	T	PF	PA	Pts
**Toronto Argonauts**	6	5	1	0	65	28	10
Ottawa Rough Riders	6	4	2	0	111	34	8
Hamilton Tigers	6	2	4	0	39	73	4
Kingston Granites	6	1	5	0	9	69	2

Quebec Rugby Football Union
Team	GP	W	L	T	PF	PA	Pts
**University of Ottawa**	6	4	2	0	124	32	8
Britannia Football Club	6	4	2	0	73	73	8
Brockville Football Club	6	3	3	0	48	65	6
Montreal Football Club	6	1	5	0	23	99	2

**Intercollegiate Rugby Football Union**
Team	GP	W	L	T	Pts
Varsity Blues	4	4	0	0	8
Queen's University	4	1	3	0	2
McGill Redmen	4	1	3	0	2

*Bold text means that they have clinched the playoffs

Manitoba Rugby Football Union
Team	GP	W	L	T	PF	PA	Pts
Winnipeg Rugby Football Club	6	4	2	0	49	35	8
St.John's Rugby Football Club	6	2	4	0	35	49	4

== League Champions ==
Football Union	League Champion
CIRFU	University of Toronto
ORFU	Toronto Argonauts
QRFU	Ottawa College
MRFU	Winnipeg Rugby Football Club

== Dominion Championship ==
November 23 1901 Dominion Championship Game: Montreal AAA Grounds - Montreal, Quebec
Toronto Argonauts 12	Ottawa College 12

November 28 1901 Dominion Championship Game: Montreal AAA Grounds - Montreal, Quebec
Toronto Argonauts 3	Ottawa College 18
Ottawa College are the 1901 Dominion Champions
