= 1894 in Canadian football =

== Canadian football news in 1894 ==
=== Final regular season standings ===
Note: GP = Games Played, W = Wins, L = Losses, T = Ties, PF = Points For, PA = Points Against, Pts = Points

Quebec Rugby Football Union
Team	GP	W	L	T	PF	PA	Pts
Ottawa College	4	4	0	0	83	33	8
Montreal Football Club	4	3	1	0	92	38	6
McGill University	4	2	2	0	36	46	4
Britannia Football Club	4	1	3	0	42	78	2
Ottawa City Football Club	4	0	4	0	22	80	0

Manitoba Rugby Football Union
Team	GP	W	L	T	PF	PA	Pts
Winnipeg Rugby Football Club	4	3	1	0	42	31	6
St.John's Rugby Football Club	4	1	3	0	31	42	0

*Bold text means that they have clinched the playoffs

== League Champions ==
Football Union	League Champion
ORFU	Queen's University
QRFU	Ottawa College
MRFU	Winnipeg Rugby Football Club
Northwest Championship	Regina NWMP

== Playoffs ==
=== QRFU Final ===
**QRFU Final** Game 1
**Ottawa College 14**	Montreal Football Club 11
**Ottawa College advance to the 1894 Dominion Championship**

=== ORFU Semi-Finals ===
**ORFU Dominion Semi-Final 1**
**Hamilton Tigers 22**	Osgoode Hall 1
**Hamilton Tigers advance to the ORFU Championship**

**ORFU Semi-Final 2**
**Queen's University**	Royal Military College
**Queen's University wins by forfeit and advances to the ORFU Championship**

=== ORFU Final ===
**ORFU Final**
Queen's University 19	Hamilton Tigers 10
**Queen's University advance to the 1894 Dominion Championship**

== Dominion Championship ==
November 17 1894 Dominion Championship Game: Rosedale Field - Toronto, Ontario
Ottawa College 8	Queen's University 7
**Ottawa College are the 1894 Dominion Champions**
