= 1889 in Canadian football =

The following is an overview of the events of 1889 in Canadian football, primarily focusing on the senior teams that played in this era. This includes news, standings, playoff games, and championships. This was the seventh season since the creation of the Ontario Rugby Football Union (ORFU) and the Quebec Rugby Football Union (QRFU).

== Canadian Football News in 1889 ==
In October 1889, L.A. Hamilton of Winnipeg donated a trophy which would represent the best team in the northwest (Manitoba & Northwest Territories). Commencing with the 1890–91 season, the Northwest Championship became a tournament played over a weekend (Usually in October but occasionally played in May). The Hamilton Cup was awarded annually to the champion of the tournament. The final championship game was won by St.John's Rugby Football Club of Winnipeg in May 1898.

In the ORFU, Ottawa College accepted two challenges from Queen's and won both games. The Toronto Argonauts won the right to challenge Ottawa College, which Ottawa won 17–2, in Ottawa. A second game between the Argonauts and Ottawa College was scheduled for November 16 in Kingston, Ontario, but Ottawa felt that it was unnecessary since they had already defeated Toronto at home and Queen's twice. The ORFU executive committee pressured Ottawa to complete the series and the students advised they would simply retire and yielded the cup. The ORFU then declared Toronto the winners, but the Argonauts did not want to accept the championship unless they earned it on the field, so the cup was returned to Ottawa College and they were named ORFU champions for a fifth straight season.

The QRFU adopted the challenge system which had been in place in the ORFU, whereby the defending champion would accept challenges for their championship. After defeating McGill, the Britannia Football Club earned the right to challenge the Montreal Football Club, who had also defeated McGill and Bishop's. Montreal won the QRFU title over Britannia 21–3. There was no Canadian Championship played this year.

== 1889 Season ==
=== Final regular season standings ===
Note: GP = Games Played, W = Wins, L = Losses, T = Ties, PF = Points For, PA = Points Against, Pts = Points

Quebec Rugby Football Union
Team	GP	W	L	T	PF	PA
Montreal Football Club	3	3	0	0	102	5
Britannia Football Club	2	1	1	0	14	28
Bishop's College	1	0	1	0	2	39
McGill University	2	0	2	0	7	53

*Bold text means that they have clinched the playoffs

== League Champions ==
Football Union	League Champion
ORFU	Ottawa College
QRFU	Montreal Football Club
Northwest Championship	Winnipeg Rugby Football Club

== Playoffs ==
=== QRFU Final ===
**QRFU Final**
Montreal Football Club 21	Brittania Football Club 3
**Montreal Football Club wins the 1889 QRFU Championship**

=== ORFU Final ===
**ORFU Final**
**Ottawa College 17**	Toronto Argonauts 2
**Ottawa College wins the 1889 ORFU Championship**

== Dominion Championship ==
No dominion championship game was played.
