= 1888 in Canadian football =

The following is an overview of the events of 1888 in Canadian football, primarily focusing on the senior teams that played in this era. This includes news, standings, playoff games, and championships. This was the sixth season since the creation of the Ontario Rugby Football Union (ORFU) and the Quebec Rugby Football Union (QRFU).

== Canadian Football News in 1888 ==
As a three-time champion, Ottawa College was awarded the ORFU Championship, provided that they defend it from challenges. Teams in the ORFU played for the right to contest, with the Hamilton Tigers emerging as the victor. However, the Ottawa College defense still handled them with ease and the team won 10–1.

With the Canadian Rugby Football Union (CRFU) ceasing operation and no governing body, an executive committee of the ORFU and QRFU champion teams arranged a Dominion Final to be played in Montreal on November 15, 1888. Ottawa College and the Montreal Football Club played to a 0–0 tie. With Montreal outplaying Ottawa College in the second half, they suggested an overtime period, but Ottawa declined and the 1888 championship ended in a tie.

=== Final regular season standings ===
Note: GP = Games Played, W = Wins, L = Losses, T = Ties, PF = Points For, PA = Points Against, Pts = Points

Quebec Rugby Football Union
Team	GP	W	L	T	PF	PA	Pts
Montreal Football Club	2	2	0	0	47	5	4
McGill University	1	0	1	0	0	33	0
Britannia Football Club	1	0	1	0	5	14	0

== League Champions ==
Football Union	League Champion
ORFU	Ottawa College
QRFU	Montreal Football Club

== Playoffs ==
=== QRFU Final ===
QRFU Final
Montreal Football Club 14	Brittania Football Club 5

=== ORFU Final ===
ORFU Final
Ottawa College 10	Hamilton Tigers 1

== Dominion Championship ==
November 15 1888 Dominion Championship Game: Montreal, Quebec
Ottawa College 0	Montreal Football Club 0
