= 1899 in Canadian football =

== Regular season ==
=== Final regular season standings ===
Note: GP = Games Played, W = Wins, L = Losses, T = Ties, PF = Points For, PA = Points Against, Pts = Points

**Ontario Rugby Football Union**
Team	GP	W	L	T	PF	PA	Pts
**Kingston Granites**	6	5	1	0	80	38	10
**Ottawa Rough Riders**	6	5	1	0	70	36	10
Toronto Argonauts	6	2	4	0	51	91	4
Hamilton Tigers	6	0	6	0	13	59	0

Quebec Rugby Football Union
Team	GP	W	L	T	PF	PA	Pts
**Brockville Football Club**	6	4	2	0	82	20	8
Ottawa College	6	4	2	0	55	58	8
Montreal Football Club	6	3	3	0	47	77	6
Britannia Football Club	6	1	5	0	32	61	2

*Bold text means that they have clinched the playoffs

Manitoba Rugby Football Union
Team	GP	W	L	T	PF	PA	Pts
St.John's Rugby Football Club	6	5	1	0	83	29	10
Winnipeg Rugby Football Club	6	1	5	0	29	83	6

== League Champions ==
Football Union	League Champion
CIRFU	University of Toronto
ORFU	Kingston Granites
QRFU	Ottawa College
MRFU	St.John's Rugby Football Club

== Playoffs ==
=== QRFU Final ===
**QRFU Final**
**Ottawa College 11**	Brockville Football Club 9
**Ottawa College wins the QRFU Championship**

=== ORFU Final ===
**ORFU Final**
**Kingston Granites 8**	Ottawa Football Club 0
**Kingston Granites wins the ORFU Championship**

== Dominion Championship ==
No dominion championship was played in 1899.
