= 1891 in Canadian football =

== Canadian football news in 1891 ==
On December 19, 1891, the Canadian Rugby (football) Union was formed as the new governing body of football in Canada. The CRU replaced the old CRFU of 1884–1887 and was to last until the birth of the Canadian Football League in 1958.

McGill beat Bishop's College 38–8 in an exhibition game on October 3, in Montreal.

=== Final regular season standings ===
Key: GP = games played, W = wins, L = losses, T = ties, PF = points for, PA = points against, Pts = points

Quebec Rugby Football Union
Team	GP	W	L	T	PF	PA	Pts
Montreal Football Club	3	2	1	0	92	38	4
McGill University	3	1	2	0	29	62	2
Britannia Football Club	1	1	1	0	21	56	2

== League Champions ==
Football Union	League Champion
ORFU	Osgoode Hall
QRFU	Montreal Football Club
Northwest Championship	Moosomin

== Playoffs ==
=== QRFU Final ===
QRFU Final
Montreal Football Club 33	McGill University 9
Montreal Football Club advance to the 1891 Dominion Championship

=== ORFU Semi-Finals ===
ORFU Semi-Final 1
Hamilton Tigers 69	London Kickers 0
Hamilton Tigers advance to the ORFU Championship

ORFU Semi-Final 2
Osgoode Hall 30	Ottawa Football Club 3
Osgoode Hall 42	Ottawa Football Club 0
Osgoode Hall advance to the ORFU Championship

=== ORFU Final ===
ORFU Final Game 1
Osgoode Hall 28	Hamilton Tigers 4
Osgoode Hall advance to the 1891 Dominion Championship

== Dominion Championship ==
November 21 1891 Dominion Championship Game: Montreal AAA Grounds - Montreal, Quebec
Osgoode Hall 21	Montreal Football Club 10
Osgoode Hall are the 1891 Dominion Champions
