= 1883 in Canadian football =

The following is an overview of the events of 1883 in Canadian football, primarily focusing on the senior teams that played in this era. This includes news, standings, playoff games, and championships. This was the first season of the creation of the Ontario Rugby Football Union (ORFU) and the Quebec Rugby Football Union (QRFU).

== Canadian Football News in 1883 ==
In this season, a point scoring system was established where a goal from field was worth six points, a try was worth four points, a safety was worth two points, and kicks to the deadline and rouges were worth one point. Each team had 15 players on the field at a time and each game was composed of two 45-minute halves. The Ontario Rugby Football Union was formed on January 6, 1883, and the Quebec Rugby Football Union would organize ten days later.

=== Final regular season standings ===
Note: GP = Games Played, W = Wins, L = Losses, T = Ties, PF = Points For, PA = Points Against, Pts = Points

Quebec Rugby Football Union
Team	GP	W	L	T	PF	PA	Pts
Montreal Football Club	4	3	0	1	5	1	7
Britannia Football Club	2	0	1	1	1	2	3
Quebec City Foot-Ball Club	1	0	1	0	0	1	0
McGill University Foot-Ball Club	1	0	1	0	0	2	0

- Bold text means that they have clinched the playoffs

== League Champions ==
Football Union	League Champion
ORFU	Toronto Foot-Ball Club
QRFU	Montreal Football Club
There were no playoff due to the Tie Schedule.

=== ORFU Semi-Finals ===
ORFU Semi-Final
**Ottawa Football Club 14**	Hamilton Tigers 9

=== ORFU Final ===
ORFU Final
**Toronto Foot-Ball Club 9**	Ottawa Football Club 7

=== Canadian Dominion Football Championship ===
No dominion championship was played.
