= Quebec Rugby Football Union =

Football league from Quebec

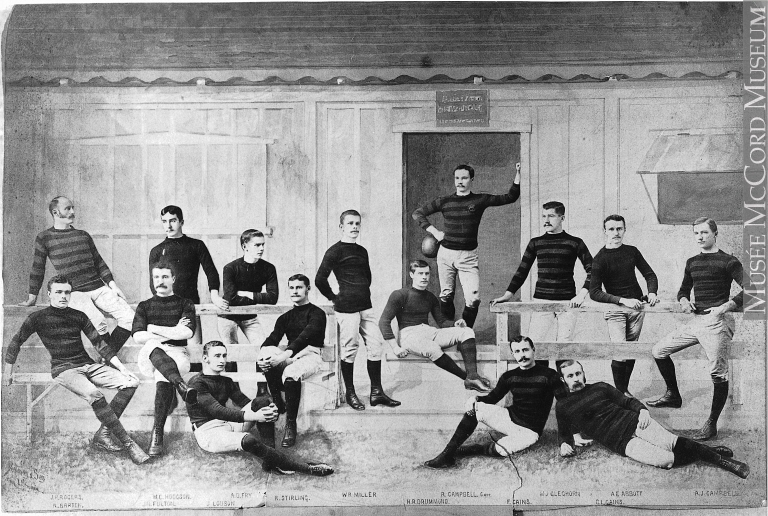
The Montreal Football Club in 1884.

The Quebec Rugby Football Union (QRFU) was a football league consisting of teams from Quebec and formed in 1883. Eastern Ontario teams like Ottawa City and Ottawa College joined in 1894.

== League formation and play ==
The QRFU was formed officially on January 16, 1883, 10 days after the Ontario Rugby Football Union. Teams from the QRFU would compete against member clubs of the ORFU for the Dominion Championship of the CRFU beginning the following season. The QRFU adopted the ORFU point-scoring system in 1884 with the formation of the Canadian Rugby Football Union. The Montreal Foot Ball Club claimed the first ever CRFU Championship 30–0 over the Toronto Football Club.

Teams of the QRFU played 15 men to a side, and did not adopt a down system until 1904, when it agreed that a team must make five yards on its third scrimmage, regardless of the gain or loss on the previous two, to keep possession of the ball.

== Scoring ==
The QRFU valued a goal from the field (field goal) as six points, a try (touchdown), goals from a try, penalties and free kicks as four points; two points for safety touches; and one point for kicks to the deadline, rouges and touch in goals.

== Teams ==
- McGill University (1883–1897)
- Montreal Football Club (1883–1906)
- Britannia Football Club (1882–1896, 1899–1903)
- Quebec City (1883, 1893)
- Bishop's College (1884–1885, 1889, 1891)
- St. George's College (1887)
- Victoria Football Club (1890)
- Ottawa City Football Club (1894–1897, 1903–1906) (suspended after the 1897 season for excessive rough play)
- Ottawa College (1894–1904)
- Kingston Granites (1898)
- Brockville Football Club (1899–1902)
- Westmount Football Club (1904–1906)
- St. Patrick Saints (1905–1906)

== QRFU Champions ==
Year	Champion
1883	Montreal Football Club
1884	Montreal Football Club
1885	Montreal Football Club
1886	Montreal Football Club
1887	Montreal Football Club
1888	Montreal Football Club
1889	Montreal Football Club
1890	McGill University
1891	Montreal Football Club
1892	Montreal Football Club
1893	Montreal Football Club
1894	Ottawa College
1895	Montreal Football Club
1896	Ottawa College
1897	Ottawa College
1898	Ottawa College
1899	Ottawa College
1900	Brockville Football Club
1901	Ottawa College
1902	Ottawa College
1903	Ottawa Rough Riders
1904	Ottawa College
1905	Ottawa Rough Riders
1906	Montreal Football Club
1907–36	No League
1937	Westmount
1938–42	No League
1943	Lachine RCAF Hurricanes
1944	St. Hyacinthe-Donnacona Navy

== Most QRFU Championships ==
- 11- Montreal Football Club (1883–89, 1891–93, 1895, 1906)
- 8- Ottawa College (1894, 1896–99, 1901–04)
- 1- McGill University (1890)
- 1- Ottawa Rough Riders 1905
- 1- Brockville Football Club 1900

== Incarnations of QRFU ==
The QRFU ceased operations in the 1907 after losing their best teams to the IRFU. The league returned in 1937 for a single season and made another return during World War II.

The league is not related to, nor shares any history, with the Quebec Rugby Federation, which administers rugby football in Quebec.

== See also ==
- Interprovincial Rugby Football Union (1907–1959)
- Ontario Rugby Football Union
