= Canadian Dominion Football Championship =

Former Canadian football competition

The Canadian Dominion Football Championship was awarded to the best amateur football team prior to the Grey Cup in 1909. Teams from the Ontario Rugby Football Union, Quebec Rugby Football Union, Interprovincial Rugby Football Union and the Canadian Intercollegiate Rugby Football Union would compete for the championship.

== Championship games ==
Game	Date	Winning team	League	Score	Losing team	League	Venue	City
1884	November 5, 1884	Montreal Football Club	QRFU	30–0	Toronto Argonauts	ORFU	University of Toronto	Toronto, Ontario
1885	November 12, 1885	QRFU All Stars	QRFU	3–0	ORFU All Stars	ORFU	University of Toronto	Toronto, Ontario
1886	No game							
1887	November 5, 1887	Ottawa College	ORFU	10–5	Montreal Football Club	QRFU	McGill University	Montreal, Quebec
1888	November 15, 1888	Tie game	ORFU	0–0	Ottawa College, Montreal Football Club	ORFU, QRFU	University of Ottawa	Ottawa, Ontario
1889	No game							
1890	No game							
1891	November 21, 1891	Osgoode Hall Law School	ORFU	21–10	Montreal Football Club	QRFU	Montreal AAA Grounds	Montreal, Quebec
1892	November 10, 1892	Osgoode Hall Law School	ORFU	45–15	Montreal Football Club	QRFU	Rosedale Field	Toronto, Ontario
1893	November 23, 1893	Queen's University	ORFU	29–11	Montreal Football Club	QRFU	Montreal AAA Grounds	Montreal, Quebec
1894	November 17, 1894	Ottawa College	QRFU	8–7	Queen's University	ORFU	Rosedale Field	Toronto, Ontario
1895	November 21, 1895	University of Toronto	ORFU	20–5	Montreal Football Club	QRFU	Montreal AAA Grounds	Montreal, Quebec
1896	November 21, 1896	Ottawa College	QRFU	12–8	University of Toronto	ORFU	Rosedale Field	Toronto, Ontario
1897	December 2, 1897	Ottawa College	QRFU	14–10	Hamilton Tigers	ORFU	Montreal AAA Grounds	Montreal, Quebec
1898	November 24, 1898	Ottawa Rough Riders	ORFU	11–1	Ottawa College	QRFU	University of Ottawa	Ottawa, Ontario
1899	No game							
1900	November 24, 1900	Ottawa Rough Riders	ORFU	17–0	Brockville Football Club	QRFU	Rosedale Field	Toronto, Ontario
1901	November 23, 1901	Ottawa College	QRFU	12–12	Toronto Argonauts	ORFU	Montreal AAA Grounds	Montreal, Quebec
1901	November 28, 1901	Ottawa College	QRFU	18–3	Toronto Argonauts	ORFU	Montreal AAA Grounds	Montreal, Quebec
1902	November 15, 1902	Ottawa Rough Riders	ORFU	5–0	Ottawa College	QRFU	University of Ottawa	Ottawa, Ontario
1903	No game							
1904	No game							
1905	November 25, 1905	University of Toronto	CIRFU	11–9	Ottawa Rough Riders	ORFU	Rosedale Field	Toronto, Ontario
1906	December 1, 1906	Hamilton Tigers	ORFU	29–3	McGill University	CIRFU	McGill University	Montreal, Quebec
1907	November 30, 1907	Montreal Football Club	QRFU	75–10	Peterborough Pets	ORFU	McGill University	Montreal, Quebec
1908	November 28, 1908	Hamilton Tigers	ORFU	21–17	University of Toronto	CIRFU	Rosedale Field	Toronto, Ontario
