= Canadian football =

Canadian team sport

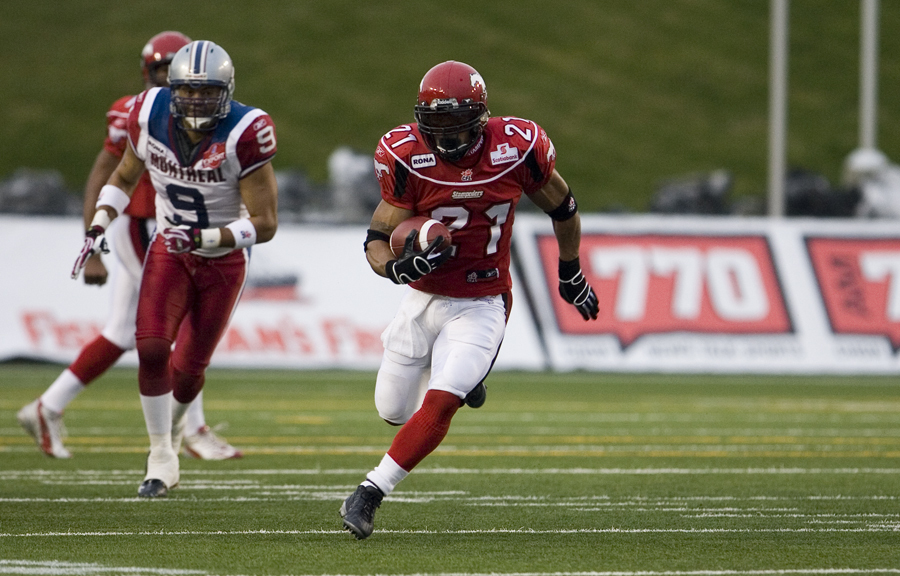
- Calgary Stampeders (in red) vs. Montreal Alouettes game in 2007
- Nicknames: Football; gridiron
- First played: November 9, 1861; 165 years ago at University College, Toronto

Characteristics
- Contact: Full
- Team members: 12
- Type: Team sport; ball game
- Equipment: Football; Football helmet; Pads (shoulder, hip, thigh, knee, tailbone, and optionally elbow pads)
- Venue: Football field (150 yards (137 m) long and 65 yards (59 m) wide)
- Glossary: Glossary of Canadian football

Presence
- Country or region: Canada
- Olympic: No

Canadian football, or simply football, is a sport in Canada in which two teams of 12 players compete on a field 110 yards (101 m) long and 65 yards (59 m) wide, attempting to advance a pointed oval-shaped ball into the opposing team's end zone.

Canadian and American football have shared origins and are closely related, but have some significant differences. Canadian football is played with three downs, goalposts in the front of the end zone, and twelve players on each side. American football has four downs, goalposts in the back of the end zone, and eleven players on each side. Canadian football is also played on a wider and longer field, with deeper end zones.

Rugby football, from which Canadian football developed, was first recorded in Canada in the early 1860s, taken there by British immigrants, possibly in 1824. Both the Canadian Football League (CFL), the sport's professional league, and Football Canada, the governing body for amateur play, trace their roots to 1880 and the founding of the Canadian Rugby Football Union. The CFL championship game, the Grey Cup, is one of Canada's biggest sporting events, attracting a large television audience.

Canadian football is also played at high school, junior, collegiate, and semi-professional levels. The Canadian Junior Football League and Quebec Junior Football League are for players aged 18–22. Post-secondary institutions compete in U Sports football for the Vanier Cup, and seniors in the Alberta Football League. The Canadian Football Hall of Fame is in Hamilton, Ontario.

== History ==
The first documented football match was a practice game played on November 9, 1861, at University College, University of Toronto (approximately 400 yards or 370 metres west of Queen's Park). One of the participants in the game involving University of Toronto students was Sir William Mulock, later chancellor of the school. A football club was formed at the university soon afterward, although its rules of play at this stage are unclear.

The first written account of a game played was on October 15, 1862, on the Montreal Cricket Grounds. It was between the First Battalion Grenadier Guards and the Second Battalion Scots Fusilier Guards resulting in a win by the Grenadier Guards 3 goals, 2 rouges to nothing. In 1864, at Trinity College, Toronto, F. Barlow Cumberland, Frederick A. Bethune, and Christopher Gwynn, devised rules based on rugby football. The game gradually gained a following, with the Hamilton Football Club (later the Hamilton Tiger-Cats) formed on November 3, 1869. Montreal Football Club was formed on April 8, 1872. Toronto Argonaut Football Club was formed on October 4, 1873, and the Ottawa Football Club (later the Ottawa Rough Riders) on September 20, 1876. Of those clubs, only the Toronto club is still in continuous operation today.

This rugby-football soon became popular at Montreal's McGill University. McGill challenged Harvard University to a two-game series in 1874, using a hybrid game of English rugby devised by the University of McGill.

The first attempt to establish a proper governing body and to adopt the current set of Rugby rules was the Foot Ball Association of Canada, organized on March 24, 1873, followed by the Canadian Rugby Football Union (CRFU) founded June 12, 1880, which included teams from Ontario and Quebec. Later both the Ontario Rugby Football Union and Quebec Rugby Football Union (ORFU and QRFU respectively) were formed (January 1883), and then the Interprovincial (1907) and Western Interprovincial Football Union (1936) (IRFU and WIFU). The CRFU reorganized into an umbrella organization forming the Canadian Rugby Union (CRU) in 1891. The immediate forerunner to the current Canadian Football League was established in 1956 when the IRFU and WIFU formed an umbrella organization, the Canadian Football Council (CFC). In 1958, the CFC left the CRU to become the "Canadian Football League" (CFL).

The Burnside rules closely resembling American football (which are similar rules developed by Walter Camp for that sport) that were incorporated in 1903 by the ORFU, were an effort to distinguish it from a more rugby-oriented game. The Burnside Rules had teams reduced to 12 men per side, introduced the snap-back system, required the offensive team to gain 10 yards on three downs, eliminated the throw-in from the sidelines, allowed only six men on the line, stated that all goals by kicking were to be worth two points and the opposition was to line up 10 yards from the defenders on all kicks. The rules were an attempt to standardize the rules throughout the country. The CIRFU, QRFU, and CRU refused to adopt the new rules at first. Forward passes were not allowed in the Canadian game until 1929, and touchdowns, which had been five points, were increased to six points in 1956, in both cases several decades after the Americans had adopted the same changes. The primary differences between the Canadian and American games stem from rule changes that the American side of the border adopted but the Canadian side did not (originally, both sides had three downs, goal posts on the goal lines, and unlimited forward motion, but the American side modified these rules and the Canadians did not). The Canadian field width was one rule that was not based on American rules, as the Canadian game was played in wider fields and stadiums than its American counterpart.

The Grey Cup was established in 1909, after being donated by Albert Grey, 4th Earl Grey, Governor General of Canada, as the championship of teams under the CRU for the Rugby Football Championship of Canada. Initially an amateur competition, it eventually became dominated by professional teams in the 1940s and early 1950s. The ORFU, the last amateur organization to compete for the trophy, withdrew from competition after the 1954 season. The move ushered in the modern era of Canadian professional football, culminating in the formation of the present-day Canadian Football League in 1958.

From the 1860s when the first matches were played, until the 1950s, the sport now known as Canadian football was often referred to as rugby football. This is evident in the names of the organizations that regulated the game, such as the Canada Rugby Union and Ontario Rugby Football Union. By the mid-1900s, though, the sport played in Canada bore little resemblance to the rugby of the rest of the Commonwealth, and instead looked a lot closer to the code played south of the border. When the CFL was formed, the name they chose was Canadian football, whilst the amateur game was still overseen by the Canadian Rugby Union. In 1967, the CRU finally changed its name to remove rugby, instead going by the Canadian Amateur Football Association. This marked the official administrative change, although newspapers and fans had begun to call it Canadian football as early as the 1910s when public attention to college football and later the NFL meant comparisons to the domestic game.

Canadian football has mostly been confined to Canada, with the United States being the only other country to have hosted high-level Canadian football games. The CFL's controversial "South Division" as it would come to be officially known attempted to put CFL teams in the United States playing under Canadian rules in 1995. The Expansion was aborted after three years; the Baltimore Stallions were the most successful of the numerous Americans teams to play in the CFL, winning the 83rd Grey Cup. Continuing financial losses, a lack of proper Canadian football venues, and the return of the NFL to Baltimore prompted the end of Canadian football on the American side of the border.

In Atlantic Canada, the CFL hosted the Touchdown Atlantic regular season game in Nova Scotia in 2005 and New Brunswick in 2010, 2011, and 2013. Prince Edward Island, the smallest of the provinces, has never hosted a CFL game, but has played college football at tiers below U Sports, such as the Holland Hurricanes representing Holland College in the Atlantic Football League. In 2013, Newfoundland and Labrador became the last province to establish football at the minor league level, with teams playing on the Avalon Peninsula and in Labrador City. The province has yet to host a college or CFL game, as is the case for any of the Northern Canada territories.

On 13 February 2023, the International Federation of American Football (IFAF) and Football Canada announced in a joint statement that the Canadian Amateur Football Rulebook would be an accepted rules code for international play, but would not be a substitute for world championships or world championship qualification.

"As Football Canada continues to work with IFAF, I believe this opens the door for international friendlies and tournaments to be staged in Canada employing the infrastructure communities have invested in for our sport from coast to coast," Football Canada president and IFAF General Secretary Jim Mullin said in the joint statement.

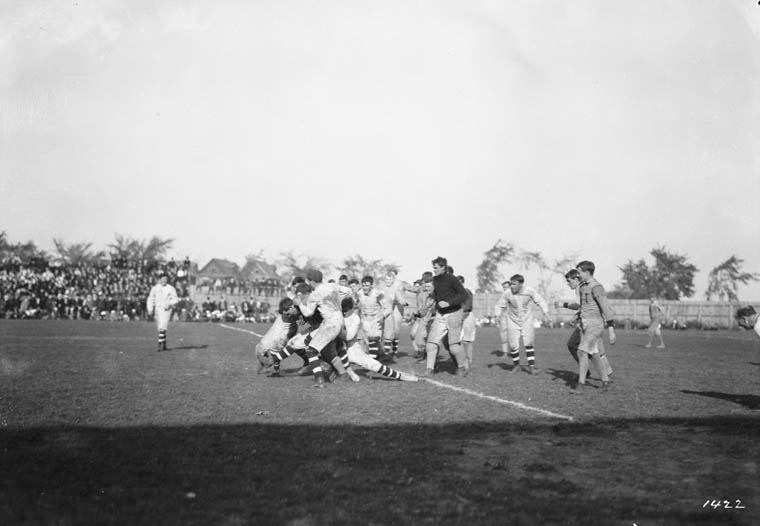
A game between the Hamilton Tigers and the Ottawa Rough Riders, 1910

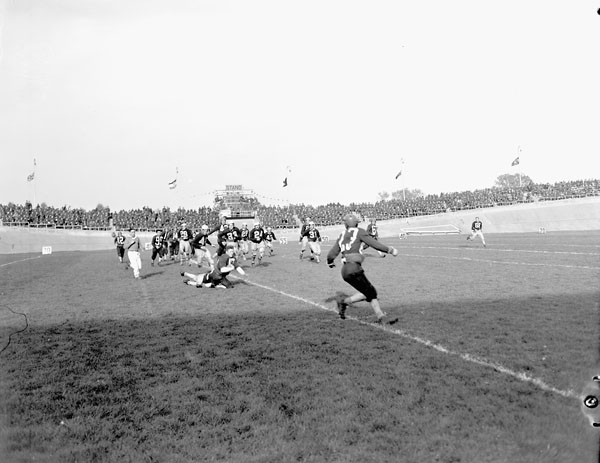
A game between the 4th Canadian Armoured Division Atoms and First Canadian Army Red and Blue Bombers, in Utrecht, Netherlands, October 1945

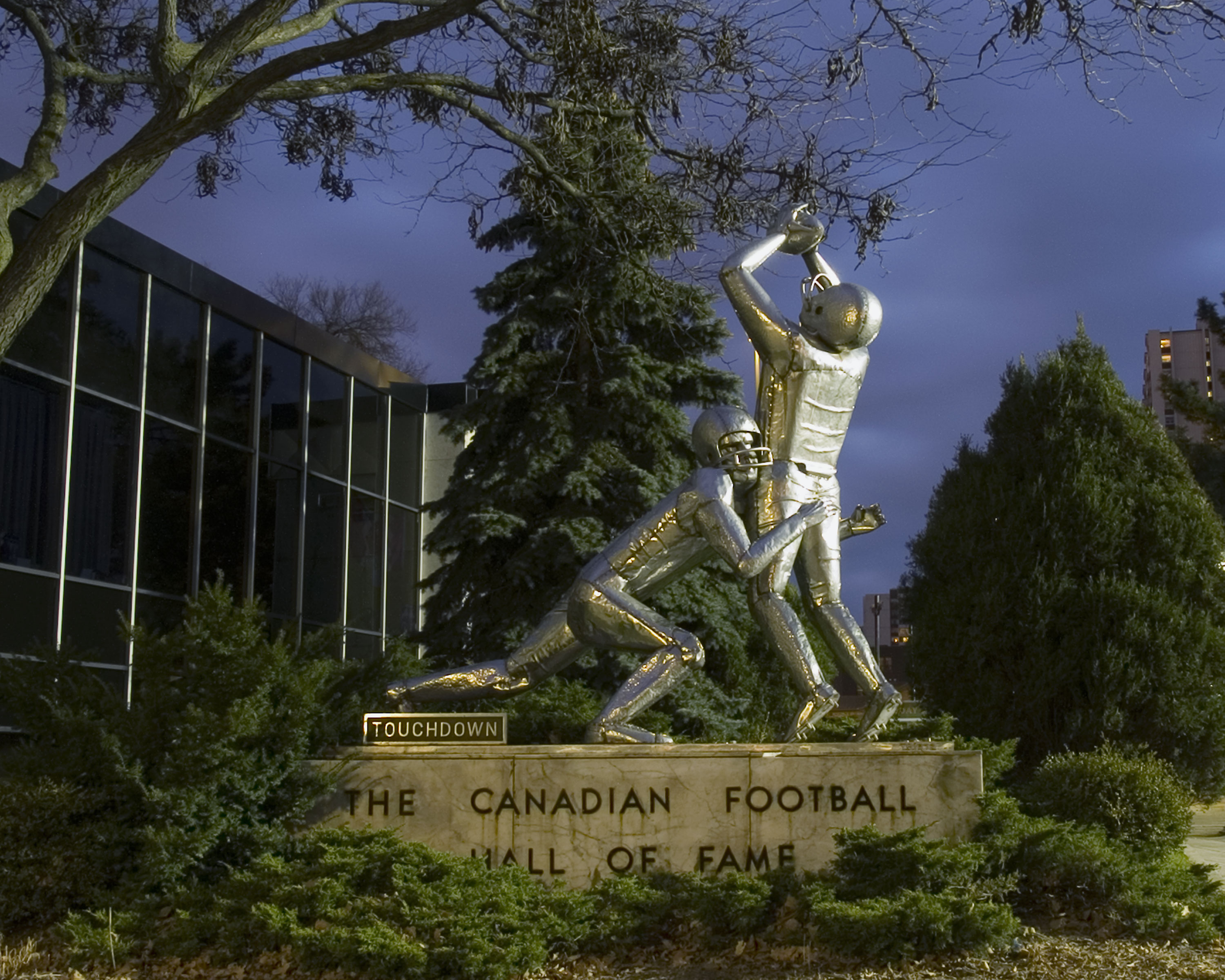
Touchdown monument outside the Canadian Football Hall of Fame in Hamilton, Ontario

== League play ==
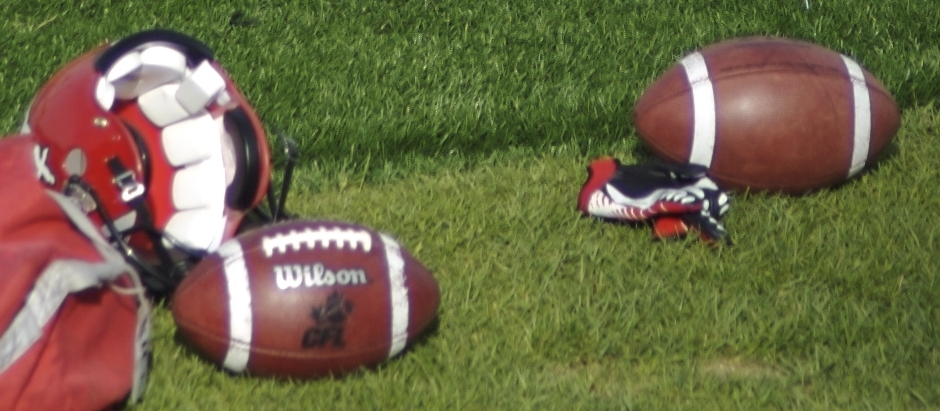
Footballs and a helmet at a Calgary Stampeders (CFL) team practice

Canadian football is played at several levels in Canada; the top league is the professional nine-team Canadian Football League (CFL). The CFL regular season begins in June, and playoffs for the Grey Cup are completed by late November. In cities with outdoor stadiums such as Edmonton, Winnipeg, Calgary, and Regina, low temperatures and icy field conditions can seriously affect the outcome of a game.

Amateur football is governed by Football Canada. At the university level, 27 teams play in four conferences under the auspices of U Sports; the U Sports champion is awarded the Vanier Cup. Junior football is played by many after high school before joining the university ranks. There are 19 junior teams in three conferences in the Canadian Junior Football League competing for the Canadian Bowl. The Quebec Junior Football League includes teams from Ontario and Quebec who battle for the Manson Cup.

Semi-professional leagues have grown in popularity in recent years, with the Alberta Football League becoming especially popular. The Northern Football Conference formed in Ontario in 1954 has also surged in popularity for former college players who do not continue to professional football. The Ontario champion plays against the Alberta champion for the "National Championship". The Canadian Major Football League is the governing body for the semi-professional game.

Women's football has gained attention in recent years in Canada. The first Canadian women's league to begin operations was the Maritime Women's Football League in 2004. The largest women's league is the Western Women's Canadian Football League.

== Field ==
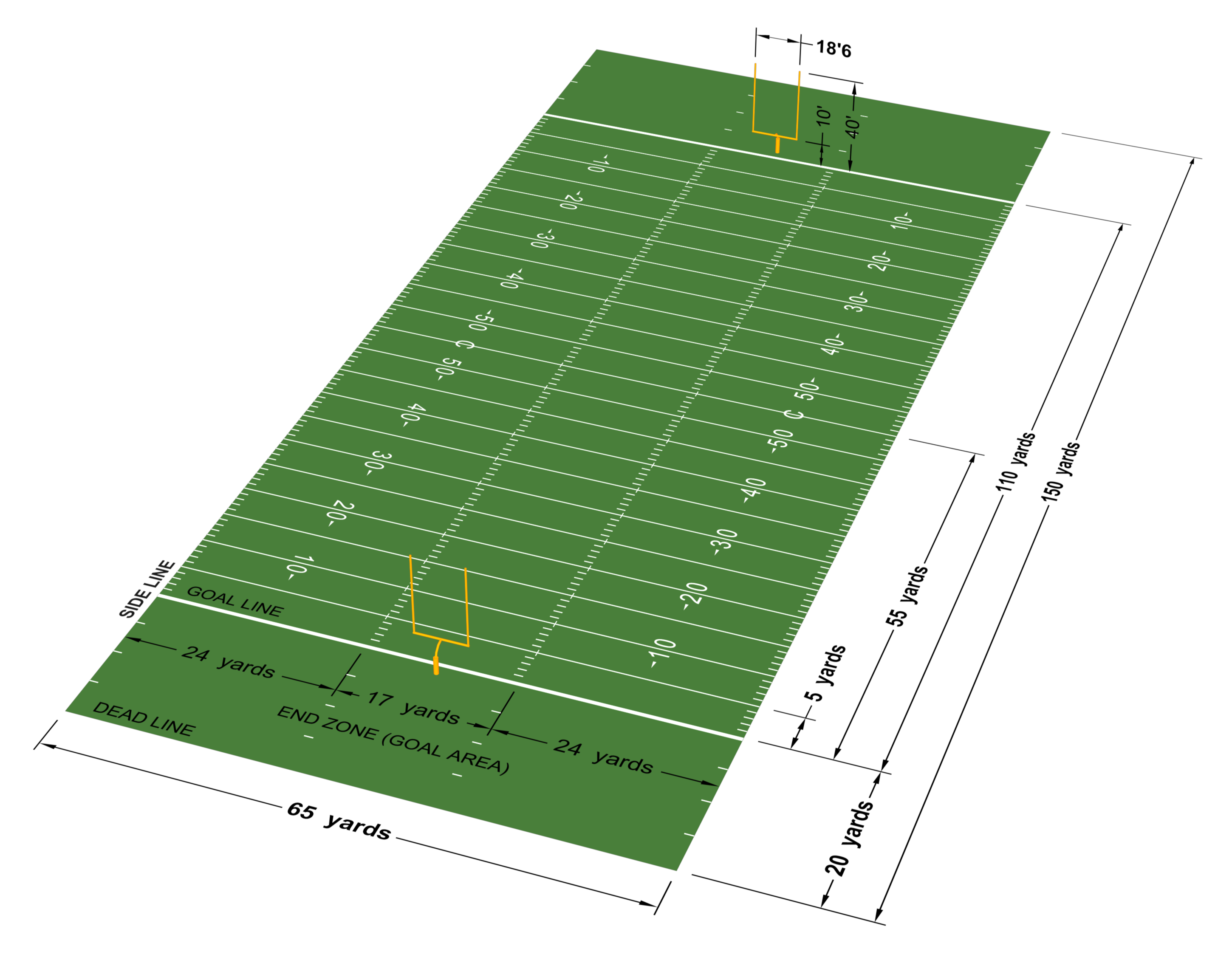
Diagram of a Canadian football field

The Canadian football field is 150 yards (137 m) long and 65 yards (59 m) wide, within which the goal areas are 20 yards (18 m) deep, and the goal lines are 110 yards (101 m) apart. Weighted pylons are placed on the inside corner of the intersections of the goal lines and end lines. Including the end zones, the total area of the field is 87,750 square feet (8,152 m^{2}).

At each goal line is a set of 40-foot-high (12 m) goalposts, which consist of two uprights joined by an 18 1/2-foot-long (5.6 m) crossbar which is 10 feet (3 m) above the goal line. The goalposts may be H-shaped (both posts fixed in the ground) although in the higher-calibre competitions the tuning-fork design (supported by a single curved post behind the goal line, so that each post starts 10 feet (3 m) above the ground) is preferred.

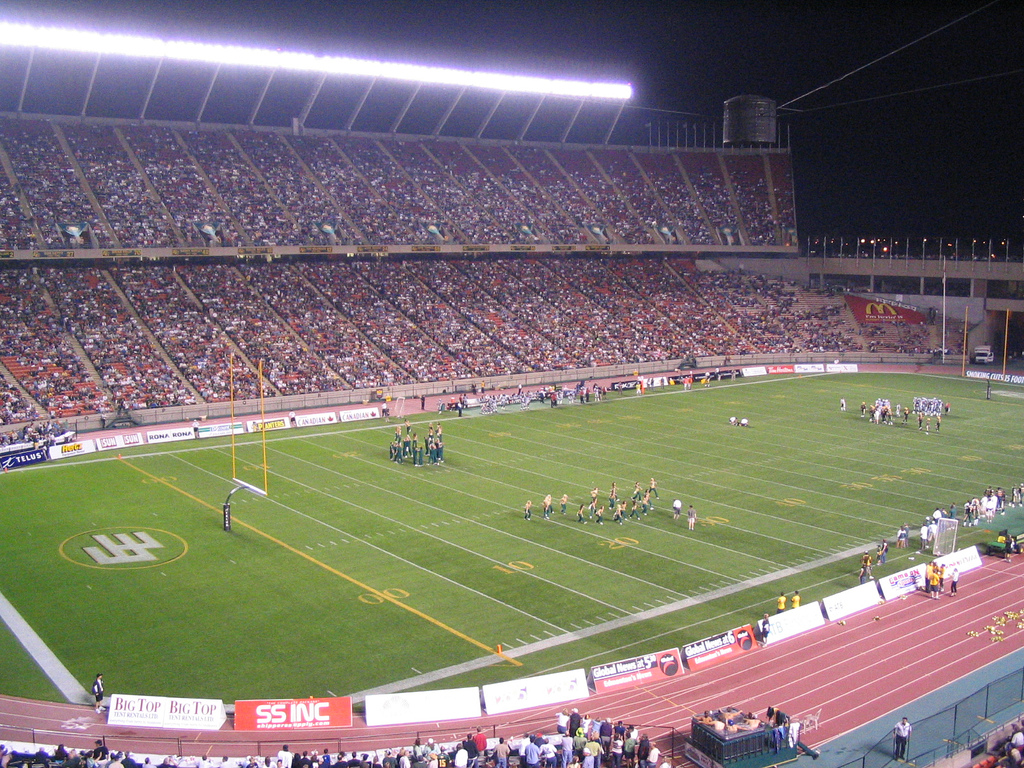
Edmonton's Commonwealth Stadium, originally built for the 1978 Commonwealth Games, pictured in 2005.

The sides of the field are marked by white sidelines, the goal line is marked in white or yellow, and white lines are drawn laterally across the field every 5 yards (4.6 m) from the goal line. These lateral lines are called "yard lines" and often marked with the distance in yards from and an arrow pointed toward the nearest goal line. Prior to the early 1980s, arrows were not used and all yard lines (in both multiples of 5 and 10) were usually marked with the distance to the goal line, including the goal line itself which was marked with either a "0" or "00"; in most stadiums today, only the yard markers in multiples of 10 are marked with numbers, with the goal line sometimes being marked with a "G". The centre (55-yard) line usually is marked with a "C" (or, more rarely, with a "55"). "Hash marks" are painted in white, parallel to the yardage lines, at 1 yard (0.9 m) intervals, 24 yards (21.9 m) from the sidelines under amateur rules, but 28 yards (25.6 m) in the CFL.

On fields that have a surrounding running track, such as Molson Stadium and many universities, the end zones are often cut off in the corners to accommodate the track. Until 1986, the end zones were 25 yards (23 m) deep, giving the field an overall length of 160 yards (150 m), and a correspondingly larger cutoff could be required at the corners. The first field to feature the shorter 20-yard end zone was Vancouver's BC Place (home of the BC Lions), which opened in 1983. This was particularly common among U.S.-based teams during the CFL's American expansion, where few American stadiums were able to accommodate the much longer and noticeably wider CFL field. The end zones in Toronto's BMO Field are only 18 yards instead of 20 yards.

Beginning in 2027, the playing field in the CFL will be shortened from 110 to 100 yards and the end zones from 20 to 15 yards. In addition, the goal posts will be moved from the goal line to the end line.

== Gameplay ==
Teams advance across the field through the execution of quick, distinct plays, which involve the possession of a brown, prolate spheroid ball with ends tapered to a point. The ball has two one-inch-wide white stripes.

=== Start of play ===
At the beginning of a match, an official tosses a coin and allows the captain of the visiting team to call heads or tails. The captain of the team winning the coin toss is given the option of having first choice, or of deferring first choice to the other captain. The captain making first choice may either choose a) to kick off or receive the kick at the beginning of the half, or b) which direction of the field to play in. The remaining choice is given to the opposing captain. Before the resumption of play in the second half, the captain that did not have first choice in the first half is given first choice. Teams usually choose to defer, so it is typical for the team that wins the coin toss to kick to begin the first half and receive to begin the second.

Play begins at the start of each half with one team place-kicking the ball from its own end of the field: the 35-yard line in the CFL, the 45-yard line in amateur play. Both teams then attempt to catch the ball. The player who recovers the ball may run while holding the ball, or laterally throw the ball to a teammate.

=== Stoppage of play ===
Play stops when the ball carrier's knee, elbow, or any other body part aside from the feet and hands, is forced to the ground (a tackle); when a forward pass is not caught on the fly (during a scrimmage); when a touchdown or a field goal is scored; when the ball leaves the playing area by any means (being carried, thrown, or fumbled out of bounds); or when the ball carrier is in a standing position but can no longer move forwards (called forward progress). If no score has been made, the next play starts from scrimmage.

=== Scrimmage ===
Before scrimmage, an official places the ball at the spot it was at the stop of clock, but no nearer than 24 yards from the sideline or 1 yard from the goal line. The line parallel to the goal line passing through the ball (line from sideline to sideline for the length of the ball) is referred to as the line of scrimmage. This line is similar to "no-man's land"; players must stay on their respective sides of this line until the play has begun again. For a scrimmage to be valid the team in possession of the football must have seven players, excluding the quarterback, within one yard of the line of scrimmage. The defending team must stay a yard or more back from the line of scrimmage.

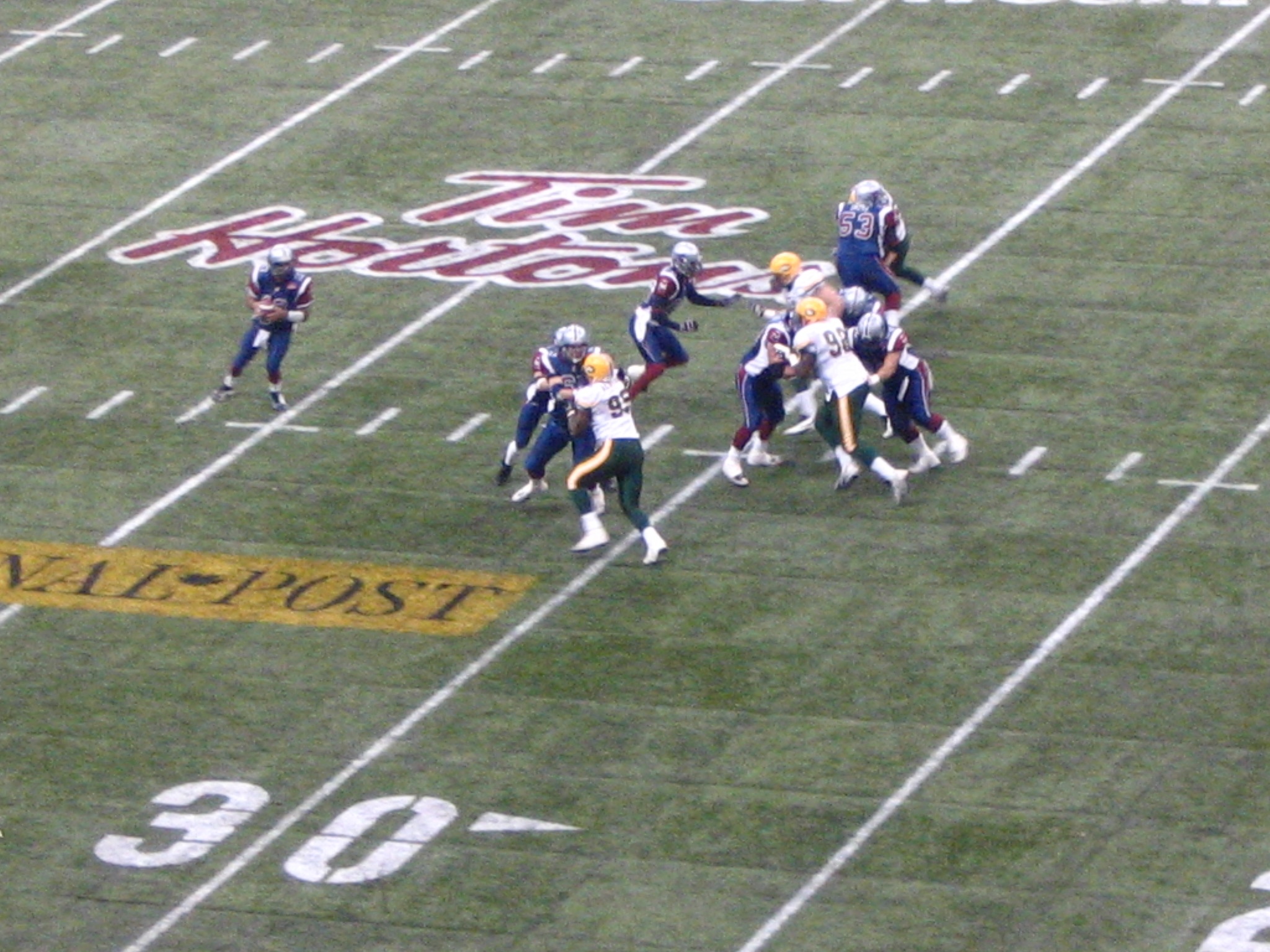
Montreal Alouettes quarterback Anthony Calvillo looks down field with the ball during the 93rd Grey Cup game at BC Place (November 2005)

On the field at the beginning of a play are two teams of 12 (and not 11 as in American football). The team in possession of the ball is the offence and the team defending is referred to as the defence. Play begins with a backwards pass through the legs (the snap) by a member of the offensive team, to another member of the offensive team. This is usually the quarterback or punter, but a "direct snap" to a running back is also not uncommon. If the quarterback or punter receives the ball, he may then do any of the following:

- Run with the ball, attempting to run farther down field (gaining yardage). The ball-carrier may run in any direction he sees fit (including backwards).
- Drop-kick the ball, dropping it onto the ground and kicking it on the bounce. (This play is now quite rare in both Canadian and American football.)
- Pass the ball laterally or backwards to a teammate. This play is known as a lateral, and may come at any time on the play. A pass which has any amount of forward momentum is a forward pass (see below); forward passes are subject to many restrictions which do not apply to laterals.
- Hand-off—hand the ball off to a teammate, typically a halfback or the fullback.
- Punt the ball; dropping it in the air and kicking it before it touches the ground. When the ball is punted, only opposing players (the receiving team), the kicker, and anyone behind the kicker when he punted the ball are able to touch the ball, or even go within five yards of the ball until it is touched by an eligible player (the no-yards rule, which is applied to all kicking plays).
- Place the ball on the ground for a place kick
- Throw a forward pass, where the ball is thrown to a receiver located farther down field (closer to the opponent's goal) than the thrower is. Forward passes are subject to the following restrictions:
  - They must be made from behind the line of scrimmage
  - Only one forward pass may be made on a play
  - The pass must be made in the direction of an eligible receiver or pass 10 yards after the line of scrimmage

Each play constitutes a down. The offence must advance the ball at least ten yards towards the opponents' goal line within three downs or forfeit the ball to their opponents. Once ten yards have been gained the offence gains a new set of three downs (rather than the four downs given in American football). Downs do not accumulate. If the offensive team completes 10 yards on their first play, they lose the other two downs and are granted another set of three. If a team fails to gain ten yards in two downs they usually punt the ball on third down or try to kick a field goal, depending on their position on the field. The team may, however use its third down in an attempt to advance the ball and gain a cumulative 10 yards.

=== Change in possession ===
The ball changes possession in the following instances:

- If the offence scores a field goal, the scored-against team can either scrimmage from its 40-yard line or have the scoring team kickoff from its 30-yard line.
- If a team scores a touchdown, the scoring team must kickoff from their own 35-yard line.
- If the defence scores on a safety (bringing the ball down in the offence's own end zone), they have the right to claim possession.
- If one team kicks the ball, the other team has the right to recover the ball and attempt a return. If a kicked ball goes out of bounds, or the kicking team scores a single or field goal as a result of the kick, the other team likewise gets possession.
- If the offence fails to make ten yards in three plays, the defence takes over on downs.
- If the offence attempts a forward pass and it is intercepted by the defence, the defence takes possession immediately (and may try to advance the ball on the play). Incomplete forward passes (those which go out of bounds, or which touch the ground without being first cleanly caught by a player) result in the end of the play, and are not returnable by either team.
- If the offence fumbles (a ball carrier drops the football, or has it dislodged by an opponent, or if the intended player fails to catch a lateral pass or a snap from centre, or a kick attempt is blocked by an opponent), the ball may be recovered (and advanced) by either team. If a fumbled ball goes out of bounds, the team whose player last touched it is awarded possession at the spot where it went out of bounds. A fumble by the offence in their own end zone, which goes out of bounds, results in a safety.
- When the first half ends, the team which kicked to start the first half will receive a kickoff to start the second half.
- After the three-minute warning near the end of each half, the offence can lose possession for a time count violation (failure to legally put the ball into play within the 20-second duration of the play clock). However, this can only occur if three specific criteria are met:
  - The offence committed a time count violation on its last attempted scrimmage play.
  - This prior violation took place on third down.
  - The referee deemed said violation to be deliberate, and warned the offence that it had to legally place the ball into play within the 20-second clock or lose possession. Such a loss of possession is statistically treated as the defence taking over on downs.

=== Rules of contact ===
There are many rules to contact in this type of football. The only player on the field who may be legally tackled is the player currently in possession of the football (the ball carrier). On a passing play a receiver, that is to say, an offensive player sent down the field to receive a pass, may not be interfered with (have his motion impeded, be blocked, etc.) unless he is within five yards of the line of scrimmage. Prior to a pass that goes beyond the line of scrimmage, a defender may not be impeded more than one yard past that line. Otherwise, any player may block another player's passage, so long as he does not hold or trip the player he intends to block. The kicker may not be contacted after the kick but before his kicking leg returns to the ground (this rule is not enforced upon a player who has blocked a kick). The quarterback may not be hit or tackled after throwing the ball, nor may he be hit while in the pocket (i.e. behind the offensive line) prior to that point below the knees or above the shoulders.

=== Infractions and penalties ===
Infractions of the rules are punished with penalties, typically a loss of yardage of 5, 10 or 15 yards against the penalized team. Minor violations such as offside (a player from either side encroaching into scrimmage zone before the play starts) are penalized five yards, more serious penalties (such as holding) are penalized 10 yards, and severe violations of the rules (such as face-masking [grabbing the face mask attached to a player's helmet]) are typically penalized 15 yards. Depending on the penalty, the penalty yardage may be assessed from the original line of scrimmage, from where the violation occurred (for example, for a pass interference infraction), or from where the ball ended after the play. Penalties on the offence may, or may not, result in a loss of down; penalties on the defence may result in a first down being automatically awarded to the offence. For particularly severe conduct, the game official(s) may eject players (ejected players may be substituted for), or in exceptional cases, declare the game over and award victory to one side or the other. Penalties do not affect the yard line which the offence must reach to gain a first down (unless the penalty results in a first down being awarded); if a penalty against the defence results in the first down yardage being attained, then the offence is awarded a first down.

If the defence is penalized on a two-point convert attempt and the offence chooses to attempt the play again, the offence must attempt another two-point convert; it cannot change to a one-point attempt. Conversely, the offence can attempt a two-point convert following a defensive penalty on a one-point attempt.

Penalties may occur before a play starts (such as offside), during the play (such as holding), or in a dead-ball situation (such as unsportsmanlike conduct).

Penalties never result in a score for the offence. For example, a point-of-foul infraction committed by the defence in their end zone is not ruled a touchdown, but instead advances the ball to the one-yard line with an automatic first down. For a distance penalty, if the yardage is greater than half the distance to the goal line, then the ball is advanced half the distance to the goal line, though only up to the one-yard line (unlike American football, in Canadian football no scrimmage may start inside either one-yard line). If the original penalty yardage would have resulted in a first down or moving the ball past the goal line, a first down is awarded.

In most cases, the non-penalized team will have the option of declining the penalty; in which case the results of the previous play stand as if the penalty had not been called. One notable exception to this rule is if the kicking team on a 3rd down punt play is penalized before the kick occurs: the receiving team may not decline the penalty and take over on downs. After the kick is made, change of possession occurs and subsequent penalties are assessed against either the spot where the ball is caught, or the runback.

=== Kicking ===
Canadian football distinguishes four ways of kicking the ball:

Place kick
Kicking a ball held on the ground by a teammate, or, on a kickoff, optionally placed on a tee (two different tees are used for kickoffs and convert/field goal attempts).
Drop kick
Kicking a ball after bouncing it on the ground. Although rarely used today, it has the same status in scoring as a place kick. This play is part of the game's rugby heritage, and was largely made obsolete when the ball with pointed ends was adopted. Unlike the American game, Canadian rules allow a drop kick to be attempted at any time by any player, but the move is very rare.
Punt
Kicking the ball after it has been released from the kicker's hand and before it hits the ground. Punts may not score a field goal, even if one should travel through the uprights. As with drop kicks, players may punt at any time.
Dribbled ball
A dribbled ball is one that has been kicked while not in possession of a player, for example, a loose ball following a fumble, a blocked kick, a kickoff, or a kick from scrimmage. The kicker of the dribbled ball and any player onside when the ball was kicked may legally recover the ball.

On any kicking play, all onside players (the kicker, and teammates behind the kicker at the time of the kick) may recover and advance the ball. Players on the kicking team who are not onside may not approach within five yards of the ball until it has been touched by the receiving team, or by an onside teammate.

=== Scoring ===
The methods of scoring are:

Touchdown
Achieved when the ball is in possession of a player in the opponent's end zone, or when the ball in the possession of a player crosses or touches the plane of the opponent's goal-line, worth 6 points (5 points until 1956). A touchdown in Canadian football is often referred to as a "major score" or simply a "major".
Conversion (or convert)
After a touchdown, the team that scored gets one scrimmage play to attempt to add one or two more points. If they make what would normally be a field goal, they score one point (a "point-after"); what would normally be a touchdown scores two points (a "two-point conversion"). In amateur games, this scrimmage is taken at the opponents' 5-yard line. The CFL formerly ran all conversion attempts from the 5-yard line as well (for a 12-yard kick), but starting in 2015 the line of scrimmage for one-point kick attempts became the 25-yard line (for a 32-yard kick), while two-point attempts are scrimmaged at the 3-yard line. No matter what happens on the convert attempt, play then continues with a kickoff (see below).
Field goal
Scored by a drop kick or place kick (except on a kickoff) when the ball, after being kicked and without again touching the ground, goes over the cross bar and between the goal posts (or between lines extended from the top of the goal posts) of the opponent's goal, worth three points. If the ball hits the upright above the cross-bar before going through, it is not considered a dead ball, and the points are scored. (Rule 5, Sect 4, Art 4(d)) If the field goal is missed, but the ball is not returnable after crossing the dead-ball-line, then it constitutes a rouge (see below).
Safety
Scored when the ball becomes dead in the possession of a team in its own goal area, or when the ball touches or crosses the dead-line, or side-line-in-goal and touches the ground, a player, or some object beyond these lines as a result of the team scored against making a play. It is worth two points. This is different from a single (see below) in that the team scored against begins with possession of the ball. The most common safety is on a third down punt from the end zone, in which the kicker decides not to punt and keeps the ball in his team's own goal area. The ball is then turned over to the receiving team (who gained the two points), by way of a kickoff from the 25-yard line or scrimmaging from the 35-yard (32 m) line on their side of the field.
Single (rouge)
Scored when the ball becomes dead in the possession of a team in its own goal area, or when the ball touches or crosses the dead-line, or side-line-in-goal, and touches the ground, a player, or some object beyond these lines as a result of the ball having been kicked from the field of play into the goal area by the scoring team. It is worth one point. This is different from a Safety (see above) in that team scored against receives possession of the ball after the score.
Officially, the single is called a rouge (French for "red") but is often referred to as a single. The exact derivation of the term is unknown, but it has been thought that in early Canadian football, the scoring of a single was signalled with a red flag. A rouge is also a method of scoring in the Eton field game, which dates from at least 1815.

==== Resumption of play ====
Resumption of play following a score is conducted under procedures which vary with the type of score.

- Following a touchdown and convert attempt (successful or not), play resumes with the scoring team kicking off from its own 35-yard line (45-yard line in amateur leagues).
- Following a field goal, the non-scoring team may choose for play to resume either with a kickoff as above, or by scrimmaging the ball from its own 35-yard line.
- Following a safety, the scoring team may choose for play to resume in either of the above ways, or it may choose to kick off from its own 35-yard line.
- Following a single/rouge, play resumes with the non-scoring team scrimmaging from its own 35-yard line (Football Canada rules) or 40-yard line (CFL rules). If the single is awarded on a missed field goal, the non-scoring team has the option to scrimmage from the yard line from which the field goal was attempted.

=== Game timing ===
The game consists of two 30-minute halves, each of which is divided into two 15-minute quarters. The clock counts down from 15:00 in each quarter. Timing rules change when there are three minutes remaining in a half. A short break interval of 2 minutes occurs after the end of each quarter (a longer break of 15 minutes at halftime), and the two teams then change goals.

In the first 27 minutes of a half, the clock stops when:

- Points are scored,
- The ball goes out of bounds,
- A forward pass is incomplete,
- The ball is dead and a penalty flag has been thrown,
- The ball is dead and teams are making substitutions (e.g., possession has changed, punting situation, short yardage situation),
- The ball is dead and a player is injured, or
- The ball is dead and a captain or a coach calls a time-out.

The clock starts again when the referee determines the ball is ready for scrimmage, except for team time-outs (where the clock starts at the snap), after a time count foul (at the snap) and kickoffs (where the clock starts not at the kick but when the ball is first touched after the kick).

In the last three minutes of a half, the clock stops whenever the ball becomes dead. On kickoffs, the clock starts when the ball is first touched after the kick. On scrimmages, when it starts depends on what ended the previous play. The clock starts when the ball is ready for scrimmage except that it starts on the snap when on the previous play:

- The ball was kicked off,
- The ball was punted,
- The ball changed possession,
- The ball went out of bounds,
- There were points scored,
- There was an incomplete forward pass,
- There was a penalty applied (not declined), or
- There was a team time-out.

During the last three minutes of a half, the penalty for failure to place the ball in play within the 20-second play clock, known as a "time count violation" (this foul is known as "delay of game" in American football), is dramatically different from during the first 27 minutes. Instead of the penalty being 5 yards with the down repeated, the base penalty (except during convert attempts) becomes loss of down on first or second down, and 10 yards on third down with the down repeated. In addition, as noted previously, the referee can give possession to the defence for repeated deliberate time count violations on third down.

The clock does not run during convert attempts in the last three minutes of a half. If the 15 minutes of a quarter expire while the ball is live, the quarter is extended until the ball becomes dead. If a quarter's time expires while the ball is dead, the quarter is extended for one more scrimmage. A quarter cannot end while a penalty is pending: after the penalty yardage is applied, the quarter is extended one scrimmage. The non-penalized team has the option to decline any penalty it considers disadvantageous, so a losing team cannot indefinitely prolong a game by repeatedly committing infractions.

=== Overtime ===
In the CFL, if the game is tied at the end of regulation play, then each team is given an equal number of offensive possessions to break the tie. A coin toss is held to determine which team will take possession first; the first team scrimmages the ball at the opponent's 35-yard line and conducts a series of downs until it scores or loses possession. If the team scores a touchdown, starting with the 2010 season, it is required to attempt a two-point conversion. The other team then scrimmages the ball at the opponent's 35-yard line and has the same opportunity to score. After the teams have completed their possessions, if one team is ahead, then it is declared the winner; otherwise, the two teams each get another chance to score, scrimmaging from the other 35-yard line. After this second round, if there is still no winner, during the regular season the game ends as a tie. In a playoff game, the teams continue to attempt to score from alternating 35-yard lines, until one team is leading after both have had an equal number of possessions.

In U Sports football, for the Uteck Bowl, Mitchell Bowl, and Vanier Cup, the same overtime procedure is followed until there is a winner.

=== Officials and fouls ===
Officials are responsible for enforcing game rules and monitoring the clock. All officials carry a whistle and wear black-and-white striped shirts and black caps except for the referee, whose cap is white. Each carries a weighted orange flag that is thrown to the ground to signal that a foul has been called. An official who spots multiple fouls will throw their cap as a secondary signal. The seven officials (of a standard seven-man crew; lower levels of play up to the university level use fewer officials) on the field are each tasked with a different set of responsibilities:

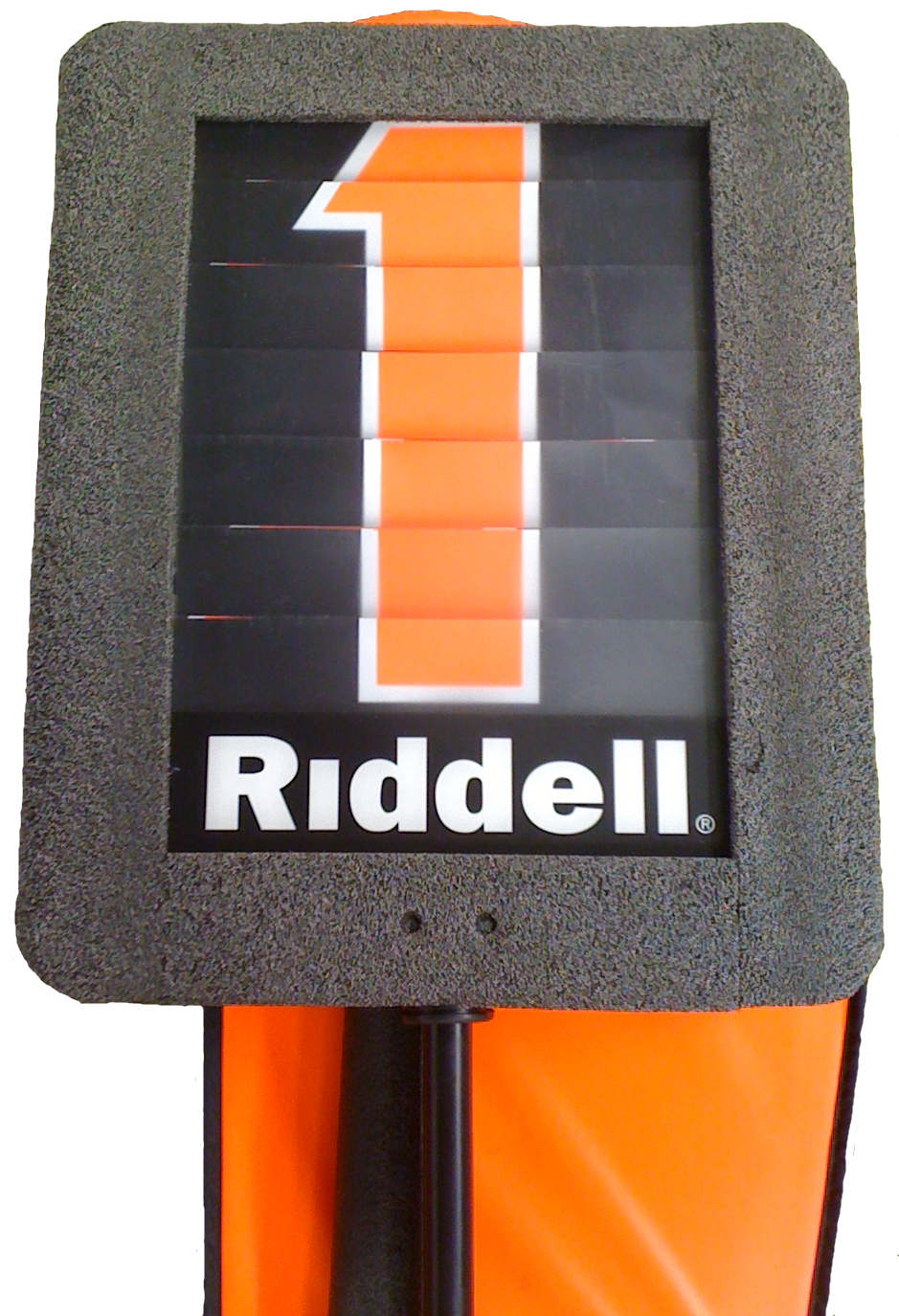
A modern down indicator box is mounted on a pole and is used to mark the current line of scrimmage. The number on the marker is changed using a dial.

- The referee is positioned behind and to the side of the offensive backs. The referee is charged with oversight and control of the game and is the authority on the score, the down number, and any rule interpretations in discussions among the other officials. The referee announces all penalties and discusses the infraction with the offending team's captain, monitors for illegal hits against the quarterback, makes requests for first-down measurements, and notifies the head coach whenever a player is ejected. The referee positions themselves to the passing arm side of the quarterback. In most games, the referee is responsible for spotting the football prior to a play from scrimmage.
- The umpire is positioned in the defensive backfield. The umpire watches play along the line of scrimmage to make sure that no more than 12 offensive players are on the field before the snap. The umpire monitors contact between offensive and defensive linemen and calls most of the holding penalties. The umpire records the number of timeouts taken and the winner of the coin toss and the game score, assists the referee in situations involving possession of the ball close to the line of scrimmage, determines whether player equipment is legal, and dries wet balls prior to the snap if a game is played in rain.
- The back judge is positioned deep in the defensive backfield, behind the umpire. The back judge ensures that the defensive team has no more than 12 players on the field and determines whether catches are legal, whether field goal or extra point attempts are good, and whether a pass interference violation occurred. The back judge is also responsible for the play clock, the time between each play, when a visible play clock is not used.
- The head linesman/down judge is positioned on one end of the line of scrimmage. The head linesman/down judge watches for any line-of-scrimmage and holding violations and assists the line judge with illegal procedure calls. The head linesman/down judge also rules on out-of-bounds calls that happen on their side of the field, oversees the chain crew and marks the forward progress of a runner when a play has been whistled dead.
- The side judge is positioned 20 yards downfield of the head linesman. The side judge mainly duplicates the functions of the field judge. On field goal and extra point attempts, the side judge is positioned lateral to the umpire.
- The line judge is positioned on the end of the line of scrimmage, opposite the head linesman. They supervise player substitutions, the line of scrimmage during punts, and game timing. The line judge notifies the referee when time has expired at the end of a quarter and notifies the head coach of the home team when five minutes remain for halftime. In the CFL, the line judge also alerts the referee when three minutes remain in the half. If the clock malfunctions or becomes inoperable, the line judge becomes the official timekeeper.
- The field judge is positioned 20 yards downfield from the line judge. The field judge monitors and controls the play clock, counts the number of defensive players on the field and watches for offensive pass interference and holding violations by offensive players. The field judge also makes decisions regarding catches, recoveries and the ball spot when a player goes out of bounds. On field goal and extra-point attempts, the field judge is stationed under the upright opposite the back judge.

Another set of officials, the chain crew, is responsible for moving the chains. The chains, consisting of two large sticks with a 10-yard-long chain between them, are used to measure for a first down. The chain crew stays on the sidelines during the game, but if requested by the officials they will briefly bring the chains on to the field to measure. The chain crew work under the direction of the head linesman and will typically consist of at least three people—two members of the chain crew will hold either of the two sticks, while a third will hold the down marker. The down marker, a large stick with a dial on it, is flipped after each play to indicate the current down and is typically moved to the approximate spot of the ball. The chain crew system has been used for over 100 years and is considered to be an accurate measure of distance, rarely subject to criticism from either side.

=== Severe weather ===
In the CFL, a game must be delayed if lightning strikes within 10 km (6 mi) of the stadium or for other severe weather conditions, or if dangerous weather is anticipated. In the regular season, if play has not resumed after 1 hour and at least half of the third quarter has been completed, the score stands as final; this happened for the first time on August 9, 2019, when a Saskatchewan–Montreal game was stopped late in the third quarter with the score having been finalized where it stood at the time of stoppage: 17–10 in favour of Saskatchewan.

If the stoppage is earlier in the game, or if it is a playoff or Grey Cup game, play may be stopped for up to 3 hours and then resume. After 3 hours of stoppage, play is terminated at least for the day. A playoff or Grey Cup game must then be resumed the following day at the point where it left off.

In the regular season, if a game is stopped for 3 hours and one team is leading by at least a certain amount, then that team is awarded a win. The size of lead required is 21, 17, or 13 depending on whether the stoppage is in the first, second, or third quarter respectively. If neither team is leading by that much and they are not scheduled to play again in the season, the game is declared a tie.

If a regular-season game is stopped for 3 hours and neither team is leading by the required amount to be awarded a win, but the two teams are scheduled to play again later in the season, then the stopped game is decided by a "two-possession shootout" procedure held before the later game is started. The procedure is generally similar to overtime in the CFL, with two major exceptions: each team must play exactly two possessions regardless of what happens; and while the score from the stopped game is not added to the shootout score, it is used instead to determine the yard line where each team starts its possessions, so the team that was leading still has an advantage.

== Positions ==
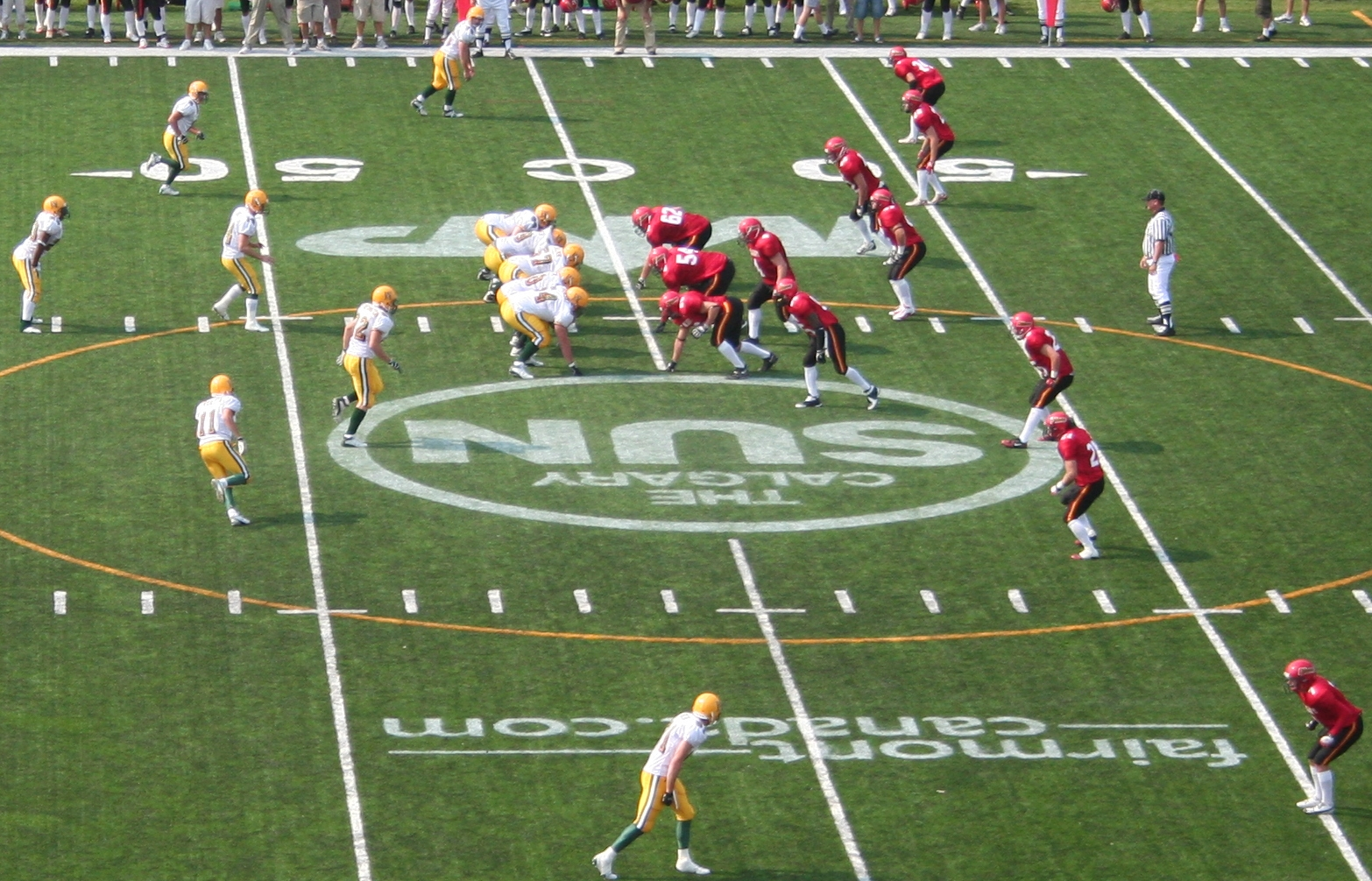

The offence (yellow and white) are first-and-ten at their 54-yard line against the defence (red and black) in a U Sports football game. The twelve players of each side and the umpire (one of seven officials) are shown. The offence is in a one-back offence with five receivers.
Note: The labels are clickable.

The positions in Canadian football have evolved throughout the years, and are not officially defined in the rules. However, there are still several standard positions, as outlined below.

=== Offence ===
The offence must have at least seven players lined up along the line of scrimmage on every play. The players on either end (usually the wide receivers) are eligible to receive forward passes, and may be in motion along the line of scrimmage prior to the snap. The other players on the line of scrimmage (usually the offensive linemen) are ineligible to receive forward passes, and once they are in position, they may not move until the play begins.

Offensive positions fit into three general categories:

==== Offensive linemen ====
The primary roles of the offensive linemen (or down linemen) are to protect the quarterback so that he can pass, and to help block on running plays. Offensive linemen generally do not run with the ball (unless they recover it on a fumble) or receive a handoff or lateral pass, but there is no rule against it.

Offensive linemen include the following positions:

Centre: Snaps the ball to the quarterback to initiate play. The most important pass blocker on pass plays. Calls offensive line plays.
Left/right guards: Stand to the left and right of the centre. Helps protect the quarterback. Usually very good run blockers, opening holes up the middle for runners.
Left/right tackles: Stand on the ends of the offensive line. These are the biggest players on the line, usually well over 300 pounds (140 kg). Usually very good pass blockers.

==== Backs ====
Backs are behind the linemen at the start of play. They may run with the ball, and receive handoffs, laterals, and forward passes. They may also be in motion before the play starts.

Backs include the following positions:

Quarterback: Generally, the leader of the offence. Calls all plays to teammates, receives the ball from the snap, and initiates the offensive play, usually by passing the ball to a receiver, handing the ball off to another back, or running the ball himself.
Fullback: Has multiple roles including pass protection, receiving, and blocking for the running back. Sometimes carries the ball, usually on short yardage situations.
Running back (or tailback): As the name implies, the main runner on the team. Also receives passes sometimes, and blocks on pass plays.

==== Receivers ====
Receivers may start the play either on or behind the line of scrimmage. They may run with the ball, and receive handoffs, laterals, and forward passes.

Receivers include the following positions:

Wide receiver: Lines up on the line of scrimmage, usually at a distance from the centre. Runs a given route to catch a pass and gain yardage.
Slotback: Lines up behind the line of scrimmage, between the wide receiver and the tackle. May begin running towards the line of scrimmage before the snap. Runs a given route to catch a pass and gain yardage.

=== Defence ===
The rules do not constrain how the defence may arrange itself, other than the requirement that they must remain one yard behind the line of scrimmage until the play starts.

Defensive positions fit into three general categories:

==== Defensive linemen ====
Left/right defensive tackles: Try to get past the offensive line, or to open holes in the offensive line for linebackers to rush the quarterback.
Nose tackle: A defensive tackle that lines up directly across from the centre.
Left/right defensive ends: The main rushing linemen. Rush the quarterback and try to stop runners behind the line of scrimmage.

==== Linebackers ====
Middle linebacker: Starts the play across from the centre, about 3–4 yards away. Generally, the leader of the defence. Calls plays for linemen and linebackers.
Weak-side linebacker: Lines up on the short side of the field, and can drop back into pass coverage, or contain a run.
Strong-side linebacker: Lines up on the long side of the field, and usually focuses on stopping the runner.

==== Defensive backs ====
Cornerback: Covers one of the wide receivers on most plays.
Defensive halfback: Covers one of the slotbacks and helps contain the run from going to the side of the field.
Safety: Covers the back of the field, usually in the centre, and as the last line of defence. Occasionally rushes the quarterback or stops the runner.

=== Special teams ===
Special teams are generally used on kicking plays, which include kickoffs, punts, field goal attempts, and extra point attempts. Special teams include the following positions:

Long snapper: Snaps the ball for a punt, field goal attempt, or extra point attempt.
Holder: Receives the snap on field goal attempts and extra point attempts. Places the ball in position and holds it for the kicker. This position is generally filled by a reserve quarterback, but occasionally the starting quarterback or punter will fill in as holder.
Kicker: Performs kickoffs. Kicks field goal attempts and extra point attempts.
Punter: Punts the ball, usually on third down.
Returner: On kickoffs, punts, and missed field goals, returns the ball as far down the field as possible. Typically, a fast, agile runner.

== See also ==
- American football
- Canadian Football Hall of Fame
- Comparison of American and Canadian football
- Glossary of Canadian football
- List of gridiron football teams in Canada
- Rugby football
