= Football Canada =

Governing body for gridiron football in Canada

- Formation: October 21, 1882; 144 years ago
- Type: National Sport Organization
- Headquarters: Ottawa, Ontario
- Members: Paid by individual, team and/or league
- Official languages: English and French
- Chairperson: Jo-Anne Polak
- Website: footballcanada.com

Football Canada is the governing body for gridiron football in Canada headquartered in Ottawa, Ontario. Football Canada focuses primarily its own Canadian form of the sport, and is currently the world's only national governing body for Canadian football.

The governing body is also Canada's representative member of the International Federation of American Football (IFAF), the world's governing body for American football. In this capacity, it organizes the Canada men's national team which competes in IFAF competitions using American rules.

== 2026 National Roster Selection ==
In May 2026, LaPolice and Football Canada's high-performance staff announced the Top 16 athletes for the Senior Men's National Flag Football Team following the selection camp in Winnipeg. The chosen roster focused heavily on former professional CFL players, including Marc-Antoine Dequoy and Daniel Petermann. The selection process drew notable debate within the Canadian flag football community regarding the omission of several prominent independent league standouts, including elite specialized rusher Isiah Allard, ahead of the IFAF World Championships.

== History ==
=== 1880–1955, Canadian Rugby Union ===
The organization, which is now known as Football Canada, was founded on June 12, 1880, as the Canadian Rugby Football Union, disbanded then revived on October 21, 1882, and re-organized as the Canadian Rugby Union on December 19, 1891.

The CRU was founded to govern a sport which at the time had rules similar to the rugby football being played in the United Kingdom. In 1909, Albert Grey, 4th Earl Grey, Governor General of Canada, donated a trophy to the CRU to be awarded for the Rugby Football Championship of Canada. This trophy became known as the Grey Cup.

Even by this time, however, the rules being played in Canada were vastly different from the rules used in countries that were part of the International Rugby Board (IRB). In the years that followed, the CRU made numerous rule changes that resulted in a game reasonably similar to the American one but unrecognizable to a rugby union enthusiast.

In the early-1910s, CRU held annual discussions dealing with rules changes due to the influence American football. The CRU elected W. A. Hewitt president for the 1915 season. He appointed a commission to establish uniform rules of play at different levels including collegiate and senior. He approached multiple football coaches and sought feedback on best ways to implement standard playing rules. After the CRU did not operate from 1916 to 1918 due to World War I, Hewitt returned as president for the 1919 season. Due to disagreements on playing rules in Western Canada, lack of interest in Eastern Canada, and students prioritizing studies instead of intercollegiate sports; national playoffs were not held in 1919.

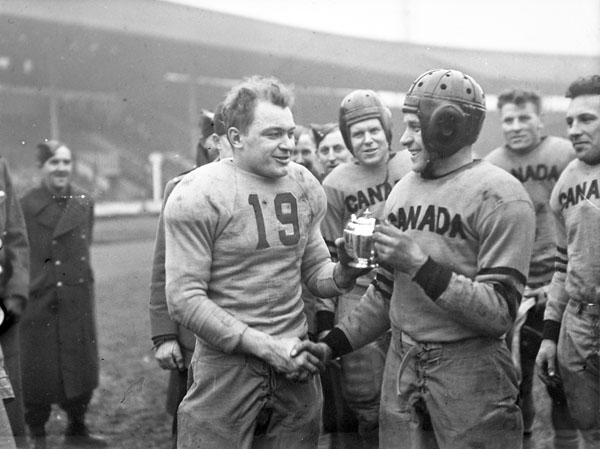
Canada vs United States at White City Stadium, London, England, February 14, 1944

Despite the divergence, the sport continued to be referred to as rugby for many years. The CRU did not change its name despite the obvious confusion (rugby union was known as English rugby in Canada). By the 1940s, however, another development was to cause further changes to the CRU's mandate. It was now clear that two of its member leagues, the Interprovincial Rugby Football Union in Eastern Canada and the Western Interprovincial Football Union in the West were far more competitive than other circuits.

=== 1956–1967, shift to amateur governance ===
By the 1950s, the two major unions had become openly professional, and in 1956 formed the Canadian Football Council (CFC) as an umbrella organization. In 1958, the CFC seceded from the CRU and became the Canadian Football League, whose teams became the sole competitors for the Grey Cup (though the amateurs had effectively been locked out since 1954). During the CFL's Grey Cup meetings in November 1966, the CRU transferred its ownership of the Grey Cup to a CFL trusteeship. In exchange, the CRU received $50,000 per year to assist the development of amateur football.

As an organization with no direct jurisdiction over the professional clubs and having become a distinct sport from rugby union by this time, the CRU changed its name to the Canadian Amateur Football Association (CAFA) in 1967. The CAFA changed its name again to Football Canada in 1986. In French, its name had long been Football Canada.

== Provincial members ==
- British Columbia Provincial Football Association
- Football Alberta
- Football Saskatchewan
- Football Manitoba
- Football Ontario
- Football Quebec
- Football New Brunswick
- Football Prince Edward Island
- Football Newfoundland and Labrador
- Football Nova Scotia

== Associate members ==
- Canadian Football League
- Canadian Football Officials Association
- U Sports
- Canadian Junior Football League

== National championships ==
- Football Canada Cup (U18 Boys)
- Girls U18 National Tackle Championship
- Flag Football National Championships
- Canadian Collegiate Flag Football Championship

== National teams ==
Men's

- Junior National Tackle Team
- Senior National Men's Tackle Team
- Senior Flag Football National Team

Women's

- Women's National Tackle Team
- Senior Flag Football National Team

== International Bowl series ==
Played from 2014 to 2020, the annual International Bowl series was a collaboration between Football Canada and USA Football featuring a series of exhibition games between the rival football nations in Texas in January and February. The event built on the previous International Bowl (2010 – 2013) format of Team USA vs. Team World.

Canada's under-18 team for the International Bowl was selected from the top players and coaches at the prior summer's Football Canada Cup.

== National Coaching Certification Program ==
Football Canada offers coaches training through the National Coaching Certification Program (NCCP) for flag, touch and tackle football.

NCCP streams

- Community Sport
- Competition-Introduction
- Competition-Development

== Safe Contact ==
As part of its NCCP program, Football Canada's Safe Contact module teaches safe contact tackling and blocking as well as concussion education. In 2014, the organization partnered with the CFL to further refine the program.

== Champions prior to 1909 ==
These are the CRU champions before the dedication of the Grey Cup.

- 1892 – Osgoode Hall (Ontario) defeated Montreal (Quebec)
- 1893 – Queen's University (Ontario) defeated Montreal (Quebec)
- 1894 – Ottawa University (Quebec) defeated Queen's University (Ontario)
- 1895 – Toronto University (Ontario) defeated Montreal (Quebec)
- 1896 – Ottawa University (Quebec) defeated Toronto University (Ontario)
- 1897 – Ottawa University (Quebec) defeated Hamilton (Ontario)
- 1898 – Ottawa (Ontario) defeated Toronto University (Intercollegiate), Ottawa (Ontario) defeated Ottawa University (Quebec)
- 1899 – No game.
- 1900 – Ottawa (Ontario) defeated Brockville (Quebec)
- 1901 – Ottawa University (Quebec) defeated Argonauts (Ontario)
- 1902 – Ottawa (Ontario) defeated Ottawa University (Quebec)
- 1903 – No game.
- 1904 – No game.
- 1905 – Toronto University (Intercollegiate) defeated Ottawa (Quebec)
- 1906 – Hamilton (Ontario) defeated McGill University (Intercollegiate)
- 1907 – Montreal (Interprovincial) defeated Peterborough (Ontario)
- 1908 – Hamilton (Interprovincial) defeated Toronto University (Intercollegiate)

The 1909 game was the first game for the Grey Cup. See the article 'List of Grey Cup champions' for the complete Grey Cup listing.

Source: Ottawa Citizen, November 28, 1910, page 8.

== See also ==
- Canadian Collegiate Athletic Association
- Comparison of Canadian and American football
- Quebec Junior Football League
- Rugby Canada
- U Sports football
