= Montreal Football Club =

Canadian football team

General information
- Founded: 1872; 154 years ago
- Folded: 1915; 111 years ago
- Stadium: Montreal AAA Grounds
- Headquartered: Montreal, Quebec, Canada
- Colours: black, red

League / conference affiliations
- QRFU (1883–1906); IRFU (1907–1915)

The Montreal Football Club was a Canadian football team based in Montreal, Quebec, that played in the Quebec Rugby Football Union from 1883 to 1906 and in the Interprovincial Rugby Football Union from 1907 to 1915. The club was a founding member of the QRFU and played in the first football game in Quebec in 1872. The club was dominant in Quebec, winning 12 of the 24 QRFU titles in the years that they played in that league. Montreal also won the first Canadian Dominion Football Championship in 1884, a predecessor of the Grey Cup and again won the championship in their first season in the IRFU in 1907.

== History ==
=== Founding ===
The Montreal Foot Ball Club was founded on April 8, 1872 in one of the lower rooms of the Mechanics Hall buildings. Their first game played was also the first football game to be played in the province of Quebec, on Saturday, October 12, 1872 against the Quebec City club in Quebec City at the Esplanade. The two teams would meet again on Saturday, October 26, 1872 at McGill University where both games would be played to 0-0 ties.

=== Quebec Rugby Football Union ===
Montreal was a founding member of the Quebec Rugby Football Union, which was formed on January 16, 1883, and became a dominant and influential force in that league. Games in the QRFU were played on a challenge system, meaning that teams would play an uneven number of games by challenging the top team. Since Montreal would frequently be a top team in the league, they would end up being challenged the most and subsequently would play the most games. Montreal repeated as QRFU champion in 1884, but this time would also play the Ontario Rugby Football Union champion after the newly formed Canadian Rugby Football Union decided to crown a national champion. Consequently, the Montreal FootBall Club would win the very first Canadian Dominion Football Championship against the Toronto FootBall Club by a score of 30-0 on November 6, 1884 at the University Lawn, Toronto.

The Montreal Club would continue their dominance over their QRFU rivals, winning the QRFU title 11 times in the 13 years since the union's inception. However, in the years that a Dominion Championship was held, the club would come home empty-handed when facing their ORFU opponent. In 1892, the QRFU switched to a balanced schedule, where all teams would face each other an equal number of times during the season, and after 1894 it would become a permanent feature of the league. Whether it was because of this or because of increased competition, Montreal lost its grip on its dominance over its opponents, and, as a result, would go ten years without a QRFU title.

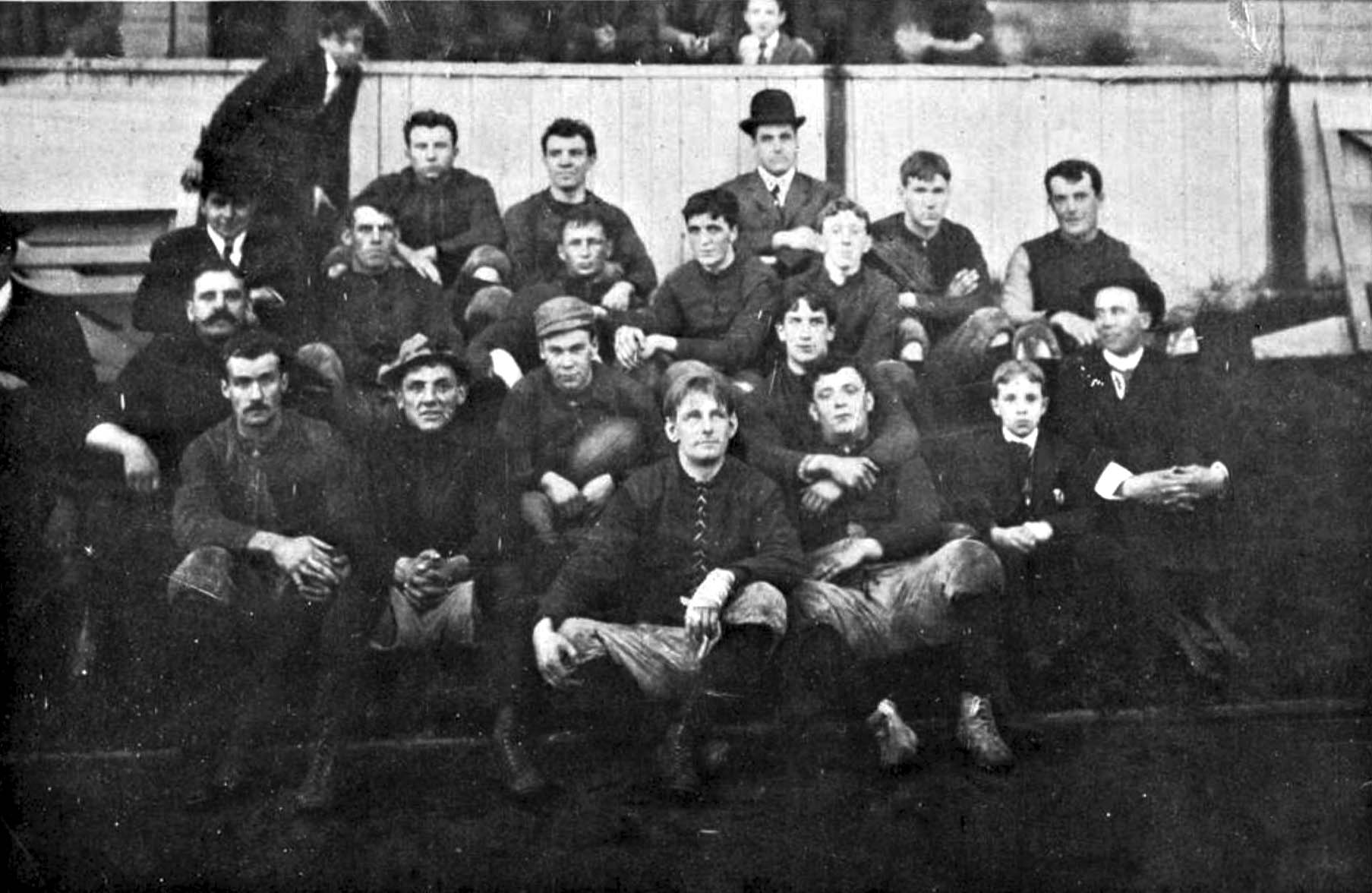
Montreal Football Club in 1905.

It wasn't until 1906 that the Montreal Football Club would regain their prowess, with a first-place finish and an undefeated record in the QRFU and their first title since 1895. In order to play in the Dominion championship, the club would have to play the ORFU champion Hamilton Tigers in order to qualify for the national championship against the Canadian Intercollegiate Rugby Football Union champion McGill University. Montreal would lose the game against the Tigers 11-6, who would go on to defeat McGill and win the Dominion Championship, extending Montreal's drought to 22 years.

=== Interprovincial Rugby Football Union ===
The Interprovincial Rugby Football Union was formed on October 2, 1907 in an amalgamation of the Montreal Football Club and the Ottawa Rough Riders of the QRFU and the Hamilton Tigers and the Toronto Argonauts of the ORFU. Montreal immediately made up for the previous season's disappointment, finishing first in the IRFU, including a win over the Tigers who had eliminated the Montreal Club from the year before. Montreal then went on to defeat the Peterborough club 71-10 on December 1, 1907 to become the first Dominion Champions of the Interprovincial Rugby Football Union, including their first national championship since their first in 1884.

However, Montreal would never regain that form as the club's fortunes waned severely in the following years. Montreal would finish last six times in the next eight years and finished third in the other two. In this stretch, they won only seven games, losing the other 41 games, including three winless seasons. 1915 was the last season of competition for the team as the Montreal Football Club did not return after the First World War ended and play resumed in 1919. They were instead replaced by the Montreal AAA Winged Wheelers.

== Seasons ==
Season	W	L	T	PF	PA	Pts	Finish	Playoffs
1883	3	0	1	5	1	-	1st, QRFU	-
1884	2	0	0	35	2	-	1st, QRFU	Won Dominion Championship
1885	2	0	0	62	0	-	1st, QRFU	-
1886	2	0	0	27	6	-	1st, QRFU	-
1887	2	0	0	52	15	-	1st, QRFU	Lost Dominion Championship
1888	2	0	0	47	5	-	1st, QRFU	Dominion Championship 0-0 Draw
1889	3	0	0	102	5	-	1st, QRFU	-
1890	1	1	1	46	38	-	2nd, QRFU	-
1891	2	1	0	92	24	-	1st, QRFU	Lost Dominion Championship
1892	3	1	0	48	29	6	1st, QRFU	Lost Dominion Championship
1893	2	0	0	35	12	-	1st, QRFU	Lost Dominion Championship
1894	3	1	0	92	38	6	2nd, QRFU	Missed playoffs
1895	3	1	0	81	30	6	1st, QRFU	Lost Dominion Championship
1896	2	2	0	48	29	4	3rd, QRFU	Missed playoffs
1897	0	1	0	13	14	0	2nd, QRFU	Missed playoffs
1898	2	2	0	84	66	4	2nd, QRFU	Lost QRFU Semi-Final
1899	3	3	0	47	77	6	3rd, QRFU	-
1900	4	2	0	73	87	8	2nd, QRFU	Missed playoffs
1901	1	5	0	23	99	2	4th, QRFU	Missed playoffs
1902	2	4	0	38	85	4	3rd, QRFU	Missed playoffs
1903	4	2	0	78	43	8	2nd, QRFU	Missed playoffs
1904	4	2	0	61	54	8	2nd, QRFU	Missed playoffs
1905	4	2	0	87	50	8	2nd, QRFU	Missed playoffs
1906	6	0	0	170	54	12	1st, QRFU	Lost Dominion Semi-Final
1907	5	1	0	85	33	10	1st, IRFU	Won Dominion Championship
1908	1	5	0	49	101	2	3rd, IRFU	Missed playoffs
1909	1	5	0	36	91	2	4th, IRFU	Missed playoffs
1910	2	4	0	74	87	4	4th, IRFU	Missed playoffs
1911	1	5	0	49	101	2	4th, IRFU	Missed playoffs
1912	0	6	0	54	112	0	4th, IRFU	Missed playoffs
1913	0	6	0	27	144	0	4th, IRFU	Missed playoffs
1914	2	4	0	62	108	4	3rd, IRFU	Missed playoffs
1915	0	6	0	10	136	0	4th, IRFU	Missed playoffs
