= List of Ottawa Rough Riders seasons =

This is an incomplete list of seasons competed by the Ottawa Rough Riders, a Canadian Football League team. While the team was founded in 1876, it did not join the CFL until the later was founded in 1958. The franchise folded in 1996 due to poor management and would not see another team until the Ottawa Renegades franchise. Throughout their history, the Rough Riders have won nine Grey Cups.

| Grey Cup/Dominion Championships† | Division Championships* | Regular season championships^ |

| League Season | Rough Riders Season | League | Division | Finish | Wins | Losses | Ties | Playoffs |
|---|---|---|---|---|---|---|---|---|
Ottawa Rough Riders
| 1898 | 1898 | ORFU†* | – | 1st^ | 6 | 0 | 0 | Won Dominion Championship (Varsity) 7–3 |
| 1899 | 1899 | ORFU | – | 2nd | 5 | 1 | 0 | Lost League Playoff (Granites) 8–0 |
| 1900 | 1900 | ORFU†* | – | 1st^ | 4 | 2 | 0 | Won League Playoff (Argonauts) 20–12; Won Dominion Championship (Brockville) 17–10 |
| 1901 | 1901 | ORFU | – | 2nd | 4 | 2 | 0 | |
| 1902 | 1902 | ORFU†* | – | 1st^ | 2 | 0 | 0 | Won Dominion Championship (College) 5–0 |
| 1903 | 1903 | QRFU | – | 1st^ | 5 | 1 | 0 | No Dominion Championship played in this year |
| 1904 | 1904 | QRFU | – | 3rd | 3 | 3 | 0 | |
| 1905 | 1905 | QRFU* | – | 1st^ | 6 | 0 | 0 | Lost Dominion Championship (Varsity) 11–9 |
| 1906 | 1906 | QRFU | – | 2nd | 4 | 2 | 0 | |
| 1907 | 1907 | IRFU | – | 3rd | 2 | 4 | 0 | |
| 1908 | 1908 | IRFU | – | 1st^ | 5 | 1 | 0 | Lost League Playoff (Tigers) 11–9 |
| 1909 | 1909 | IRFU* | – | 2nd | 5 | 1 | 0 | Won League Playoff (Tigers) 14–8; Lost Eastern Semi-Final (Varsity) 31–7 |
| 1910 | 1910 | IRFU | – | 3rd | 3 | 3 | 0 | |
| 1911 | 1911 | IRFU | – | 3rd | 3 | 3 | 0 | |
| 1912 | 1912 | IRFU | – | 2nd | 4 | 2 | 0 | |
| 1913 | 1913 | IRFU | – | 2nd | 4 | 2 | 0 | |
| 1914 | 1914 | IRFU | – | 4th | 0 | 6 | 0 | |
| 1915 | 1915 | IRFU | – | 3rd | 2 | 4 | 0 | |
| 1916 | season cancelled (World War I) | | | | | | | |
| 1917 | season cancelled (World War I) | | | | | | | |
| 1918 | season cancelled (World War I) | | | | | | | |
| 1919 | 1919 | IRFU | – | 4th | 2 | 4 | 0 | |
| 1920 | 1920 | IRFU | – | 3rd | 3 | 3 | 0 | |
| 1921 | 1921 | IRFU | – | 2nd | 3 | 3 | 0 | |
| 1922 | 1922 | IRFU | – | 4th | 0 | 5 | 1 | |
| 1923 | 1923 | IRFU | – | 4th | 1 | 5 | 0 | |
| 1924 | 1924 | IRFU | – | 3rd | 2 | 4 | 0 | |
Ottawa Senators
| 1925 | 1925 | IRFU†* | – | 1st^ | 4 | 1 | 1 | Won East Finals (Queen's) 11–2; Won Grey Cup (Tammany Tigers) 24–1 |
| 1926 | 1926 | IRFU†* | – | 1st^ | 5 | 1 | 0 | Won East Finals (Beachers) 7–6; Won Grey Cup (Varsity Blues) 10–7 |
| 1927 | 1927 | IRFU | – | 2nd | 3 | 2 | 1 | |
| 1928 | 1928 | IRFU | – | 4th | 1 | 4 | 1 | |
| 1929 | 1929 | IRFU | – | 4th | 0 | 6 | 0 | |
| 1930 | 1930 | IRFU | – | 4th | 0 | 6 | 0 | |
Ottawa Rough Riders
| 1931 | 1931 | IRFU | – | 4th | 0 | 6 | 0 | |
| 1932 | 1932 | IRFU | – | 4th | 0 | 6 | 0 | |
| 1933 | 1933 | IRFU | – | 3rd | 3 | 3 | 0 | |
| 1934 | 1934 | IRFU | – | 4th | 1 | 5 | 0 | |
| 1935 | 1935 | IRFU | – | 3rd | 5 | 4 | 0 | |
| 1936 | 1936 | IRFU* | – | 2nd | 3 | 3 | 0 | Won I.R.F.U. Semi-Finals (Tigers) 3–2; Won East Finals (Argonauts) 2–0 series (22–6 points); Lost Grey Cup (Imperials) 26–20 |
| 1937 | 1937 | IRFU | – | 2nd | 3 | 3 | 0 | Lost I.R.F.U. Semi-Finals (Argonauts) 1–1 series (21–16 points) |
| 1938 | 1938 | IRFU | – | 1st^ | 5 | 1 | 0 | Lost I.R.F.U. Semi-Finals (Argonauts) 0–2 series (14–4 points) |
| 1939 | 1939 | IRFU* | – | 1st^ | 5 | 1 | 0 | Won I.R.F.U. Semi-Finals (Argonauts) 2–0 series (39–6 points); Won East Finals (Imperials) 2–0 series (22–6 points); Lost Grey Cup (Blue Bombers) 8–7 |
| 1940 | 1940 | IRFU†* | – | 1st^ | 5 | 1 | 0 | Won I.R.F.U. Finals (Argonauts) 2–0 series (20–2 points); Won Grey Cup (Beachers) 2–0 series (20–7 points) |
| 1941 | 1941 | ECU* | – | 1st^ | 5 | 1 | 0 | Won I.R.F.U. Finals (Argonauts) 1–1 series (18–17 points); Won East Finals (Wildcats) 7–2; Lost Grey Cup (Blue Bombers) 18–16 |
| 1942 | 1942 | OCSRFU | – | 1st^ | 3 | 1 | 0 | Lost OCSRFU Finals (RCAF Uplands) 9–0 |
| 1943 | season cancelled (World War II) | | | | | | | |
| 1944 | season cancelled (World War II) | | | | | | | |
| 1945 | 1945 | IRFU | – | 1st^ | 5 | 1 | 0 | Lost I.R.F.U. Finals (Argonauts) 1–1 series (33–18 points) |
| 1946 | 1946 | IRFU | – | 3rd | 6 | 4 | 2 | |
| 1947 | 1947 | IRFU | – | 1st^ | 8 | 4 | 0 | Lost I.R.F.U. Finals (Argonauts) 0–2 series (24–0 points) |
| 1948 | 1948 | IRFU* | – | 1st^ | 10 | 2 | 0 | Won I.R.F.U. Finals (Alouettes) 1–1 series (34–28 points); Won East Finals (Tigers) 19–0; Lost Grey Cup (Stampeders) 12–7 |
| 1949 | 1949 | IRFU | – | 1st^ | 11 | 1 | 0 | Lost I.R.F.U. Finals (Alouettes) 0–2 series (36–20 points) |
| 1950 | 1950 | IRFU | – | 4th | 4 | 7 | 1 | |
| 1951 | 1951 | IRFU†* | – | 1st^ | 7 | 5 | 0 | Won I.R.F.U. Finals (Tiger-Cats) 2–0 series (28–16 points); Won East Finals (Imperials) 43–17; Won Grey Cup (Roughriders) 21–14 |
| 1952 | 1952 | IRFU | – | 3rd | 5 | 7 | 0 | |
| 1953 | 1953 | IRFU | – | 3rd | 7 | 7 | 0 | |
| 1954 | 1954 | IRFU | – | 4th | 2 | 12 | 0 | |
| 1955 | 1955 | IRFU | – | 4th | 3 | 9 | 0 | |
| 1956 | 1956 | IRFU | – | 3rd | 7 | 7 | 0 | Lost I.R.F.U. Semi-Finals (Tiger-Cats) 46–21 |
| 1957 | 1957 | IRFU | – | 2nd | 8 | 6 | 0 | Lost I.R.F.U. Semi-Finals (Alouettes) 24–15 |
| 1958 | 1958 | CFL | I.R.F.U. | 3rd | 6 | 8 | 0 | Won I.R.F.U. Semi-Finals (Alouettes) 26–12; Lost I.R.F.U. Finals (Tiger-Cats) 0–2 series (54–14 points) |
| 1959 | 1959 | CFL | I.R.F.U. | 2nd | 8 | 6 | 0 | Won East Semi-Finals (Alouettes) 26–12; Lost East Finals (Tiger-Cats) 1–1 series (26–24 points) |
| 1960 | 1960 | CFL† | I.R.F.U.* | 2nd | 9 | 5 | 0 | Won East Semi-Finals (Alouettes) 30–14; Won East Finals (Argonauts) 2–0 series (54–41 points); Won Grey Cup (Eskimos) 16–6 |
| 1961 | 1961 | CFL | East | 2nd | 8 | 6 | 0 | Lost East Semi-Finals (Argonauts) 43–19 |
| 1962 | 1962 | CFL | East | 2nd | 6 | 7 | 1 | Lost East Semi-Finals (Alouettes) 18–17 |
| 1963 | 1963 | CFL | East | 2nd | 9 | 5 | 0 | Won East Semi-Finals (Alouettes) 17–5; Lost East Finals (Tiger-Cats) 1–1 series (63–35 points) |
| 1964 | 1964 | CFL | East | 2nd | 8 | 5 | 1 | Won East Semi-Finals (Alouettes) 27–0; Lost East Finals (Tiger-Cats) 1–1 series (39–38 points) |
| 1965 | 1965 | CFL | East | 2nd | 7 | 7 | 0 | Won East Semi-Finals (Alouettes) 36–7; Lost East Finals (Tiger-Cats) 0–1-1 series (25–20 points) |
| 1966 | 1966 | CFL | East* | 1st^ | 11 | 3 | 0 | Won East Finals (Tiger-Cats) 2–0 series (72–17 points); Lost Grey Cup (Roughriders) 29–14 |
| 1967 | 1967 | CFL | East | 2nd | 9 | 4 | 1 | Won East Semi-Finals (Argonauts) 38–22; Lost East Finals (Tiger-Cats) 0–2 series (37–3 points) |
| 1968 | 1968 | CFL† | East* | 1st^ | 9 | 3 | 2 | Won East Finals (Argonauts) 1–1 series (47–27 points); Won Grey Cup (Stampeders) 24–21 |
| 1969 | 1969 | CFL† | East* | 1st^ | 11 | 3 | 0 | Won East Finals (Argonauts) 1–1 series (46–25 points); Won Grey Cup (Roughriders) 29–11 |
| 1970 | 1970 | CFL | East | 4th | 4 | 10 | 0 | |
| 1971 | 1971 | CFL | East | 3rd | 6 | 8 | 0 | Lost East Semi-Finals (Hamilton Tiger-Cats) 23–4 |
| 1972 | 1972 | CFL | East | 2nd | 11 | 3 | 0 | Won East Semi-Final (Alouettes) 14–11; Lost East Final (Tiger-Cats) 19–7 |
| 1973 | 1973 | CFL† | East* | 1st^ | 9 | 5 | 0 | Won East Final (Alouettes) 23–14; Won Grey Cup (Eskimos) 22–18 |
| 1974 | 1974 | CFL | East | 2nd | 7 | 9 | 0 | Won East Semi-Final (Tiger-Cats) 21–19; Lost East Final (Alouettes) 14–4 |
| 1975 | 1975 | CFL | East | 1st^ | 10 | 5 | 1 | Lost East Final (Alouettes) 20–10 |
| 1976 | 1976 | CFL† | East* | 1st^ | 9 | 6 | 1 | Won East Final (Tiger-Cats) 17–15; Won Grey Cup (Roughriders) 23–20 |
| 1977 | 1977 | CFL | East | 2nd | 8 | 8 | 0 | Won East Semi-Final (Argonauts) 21–16; Lost East Final (Alouettes) 21–18 |
| 1978 | 1978 | CFL | East | 1st^ | 11 | 5 | 0 | Lost East Final (Alouettes) 21–16 |
| 1979 | 1979 | CFL | East | 2nd | 8 | 6 | 2 | Won East Semi-Final (Tiger-Cats) 29–26; Lost East Final (Alouettes) 17–6 |
| 1980 | 1980 | CFL | East | 3rd | 7 | 9 | 0 | Lost East Semi-Final (Alouettes) 25–21 |
| 1981 | 1981 | CFL | East* | 2nd | 5 | 11 | 0 | Won East Semi-Final (Montreal Alouettes) 20–16; Won East Final (Tiger-Cats) 17–13; Lost Grey Cup (Eskimos) 26–23 |
| 1982 | 1982 | CFL | East | 3rd | 5 | 11 | 0 | Won East Semi-Final (Tiger-Cats) 30–20; Lost East Final (Argonauts) 44–7 |
| 1983 | 1983 | CFL | East | 2nd | 8 | 8 | 0 | Lost East Semi-Final (Tiger-Cats) 33–31 |
| 1984 | 1984 | CFL | East | 4th | 4 | 12 | 0 | |
| 1985 | 1985 | CFL | East | 3rd | 7 | 9 | 0 | Lost East Semi-Final (Concordes) 30–20 |
| 1986 | 1986 | CFL | East | 4th | 3 | 14 | 1 | |
| 1987 | 1987 | CFL | East | 4th | 3 | 15 | 0 | |
| 1988 | 1988 | CFL | East | 4th | 2 | 16 | 0 | |
| 1989 | 1989 | CFL | East | 4th | 4 | 14 | 0 | |
| 1990 | 1990 | CFL | East | 3rd | 7 | 11 | 0 | Lost East Semi-Final (Argonauts) 34–25 |
| 1991 | 1991 | CFL | East | 3rd | 7 | 11 | 0 | Lost East Semi-Final (Blue Bombers) 26–8 |
| 1992 | 1992 | CFL | East | 3rd | 9 | 9 | 0 | Lost East Semi-Final (Tiger-Cats) 29–28 |
| 1993 | 1993 | CFL | East | 3rd | 4 | 14 | 0 | Lost East Semi-Final (Tiger-Cats) 21–10 |
| 1994 | 1994 | CFL | East | 4th | 4 | 14 | 0 | Lost East Semi-Final (Blue Bombers) 26–16 |
| 1995 | 1995 | CFL | North | 8th | 3 | 15 | 0 | |
| 1996 | 1996 | CFL | East | 4th | 3 | 15 | 0 | |
| Regular season Totals (1898–1996) | | | | | 481 | 523 | 17 | |
| Playoff Totals (1898–1996) | | | | | 51 | 78 | | |
| Grey Cup Totals (1909–1996) | | | | | 9 | 6 | | |
| Dominion Championship Totals (1898–1908) | | | | | 3 | 1 | | |
