= List of Ottawa Football Clubs head coaches =

The following is an incomplete list of Ottawa Football Clubs head coaches in the Canadian Football League (CFL) and preceding Interprovincial Rugby Football Union (IRFU), Quebec Rugby Football Union (QRFU), and Ontario Rugby Football Union (ORFU). The current incarnation of the club, Ottawa Redblacks, are a professional Canadian football team based in Ottawa, Ontario, and are members of the East Division of the CFL.

As defined in the 2021 CFL Guide & Record Book, for historical record purposes and by the current Ottawa Redblacks' request, the Ottawa Football Clubs are considered to be a single entity since 1876 with two periods of inactivity (1997–2001 and 2006–2013). Consequently, this list includes figures from the Ottawa Football Club (1876–1898), Ottawa Rough Riders (1899–1925, 1931–1996), Ottawa Senators (1926–1930), Ottawa Renegades (2002–2005), and Ottawa Redblacks (2014–present).

The club was founded as the Ottawa Football Club in 1876 and was a founding member of the Ontario Rugby Football Union in 1883 and of the Interprovincial Rugby Football Union in 1907. The current Ottawa Redblacks head coach is Ryan Dinwiddie.

== Key ==
General
#	Number of coaches^{[a]}
†	Elected to the Canadian Football Hall of Fame in the builders category
Achievements	Achievements during their Ottawa head coaching tenure

Regular season
GC	Games coached	T	Ties = 1 point
W	Wins = 2 points	PTS	Points
L	Losses = 0 points	W%	Winning percentage^{[b]}

Playoffs and Grey Cup
PGC	Games coached
PW	Wins
PL	Losses
PW%	Winning percentage

== Head coaches ==
Note: Statistics are current through the end of the 2026 CFL season.

#	Name^{[c]}	Term^{[b]}	GC	W	L	T	PTS	W%	PGC	PW	PL	PW%	Achievements
1	Tom Clancy	1904–1911	48	31	17	0	62	.646	4	1	3	.250	
2	Doc Galvin	1912	6	4	2	0	8	.667	—	—	—	—	
3	Bill Stanton	1913	6	4	2	0	8	.667	—	—	—	—	
4	Eddie Gerard	1914	6	0	6	0	0	.000	—	—	—	—	
5	Frank Shaughnessy†	1915	6	2	4	0	4	.333	—	—	—	—	
6	Dave McCann†	1919	6	2	4	0	4	.333	—	—	—	—	
7	Silver Quilty†	1920	6	3	3	0	6	.500	—	—	—	—	
—	Tom Clancy	1921–1922	12	3	8	1	10	.292	—	—	—	—	
—	Silver Quilty†	1923	6	1	5	0	2	.167	—	—	—	—	
—	Dave McCann†	1924–1927	24	14	8	2	6	.625	4	4	0	1.000	13th Grey Cup championship 14th Grey Cup championship
8	Walter Gilhooly	1928	6	1	4	1	0	.250	—	—	—	—	
9	Joe Miller	1929	6	0	6	0	0	.000	—	—	—	—	
10	Andy Davies†	1930	6	0	6	0	0	.000	—	—	—	—	
—	Dave McCann†	1931–1932	12	0	12	0	0	.000	—	—	—	—	
11	Wally Masters	1933–1934	12	4	8	0	8	.333	—	—	—	—	
12	Billy Hughes†	1935–1936	15	8	7	0	16	.533	4	3	1	.250	
13	Ross Trimble	1937–1945	36	28	8	0	56	.778	19	12	7	.632	28th Grey Cup championship
14	George Fraser	1946	12	6	4	2	14	.583	—	—	—	—	
15	Sammy Fox	1947	12	8	4	0	16	.667	2	0	2	.000	
—	Wally Masters	1948–1950	36	25	10	1	51	.708	6	3	3	.500	
16	Clem Crowe	1951–1954	52	21	31	0	42	.404	4	4	0	1.000	39th Grey Cup championship
17	Chan Caldwell	1955	12	3	9	0	6	.250	—	—	—	—	
18	Frank Clair†	1956–1969	196	116	75	5	237	.605	35	19	16	.543	1966 Annis Stukus Trophy winner 1969 Annis Stukus Trophy winner 48th Grey Cup championship 56th Grey Cup championship 57th Grey Cup championship
19	Jack Gotta	1970–1973	56	30	26	0	60	.536	5	3	2	.600	1972 Annis Stukus Trophy winner 1973 Annis Stukus Trophy winner 61st Grey Cup championship
20	George Brancato	1974–1984	176	82	90	4	168	.477	5	8	9	.471	1975 Annis Stukus Trophy winner 64th Grey Cup championship
21	Joe Moss	1985–1986	29	10	19	0	18	.345	1	0	1	.000	
22	Tom Dimitroff	1986	5	0	4	1	1	.100	—	—	—	—	
23	Fred Glick	1987–1988	21	3	18	0	6	.143	—	—	—	—	
24	Bob Weber	1988	15	2	13	0	4	.133	—	—	—	—	
25	Steve Goldman	1989–1991	40	11	29	0	22	.275	1	0	1	.000	
26	Joe Faragalli	1991	14	7	7	0	14	.500	1	0	1	.000	
27	Ron Smeltzer	1992–1993	36	13	23	0	26	.361	2	0	2	.000	
28	Adam Rita	1994	18	4	14	0	8	.222	1	0	1	.000	
29	Jim Gilstrap	1995–1996	20	3	17	0	6	.150	—	—	—	—	
30	John Payne	1996	16	3	13	0	6	.188	—	—	—	—	
31	Joe Paopao	2002–2005	72	23	49	0	46	.319	—	—	—	—	
32	John Jenkins	2006	—	—	—	—	—	—	—	—	—	—	Team folded before Jenkins coached a game.
33	Rick Campbell	2014–2019	108	44	62	2	90	.417	7	4	3	.571	2015 Annis Stukus Trophy winner 104th Grey Cup championship
34	Paul LaPolice	2020–2022	28	6	22	0	12	.214	—	—	—	—	
35	Bob Dyce	2022–2025	58	18	39	1	37	.319	1	0	1	.000	
36	Ryan Dinwiddie	2025–present	18	1	17	0	2	.056	—	—	—	—	

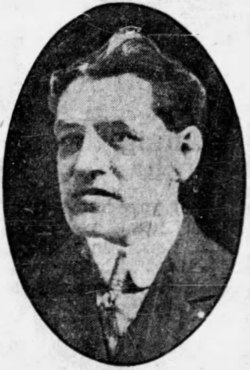
Tom Clancy was the team's first head coach upon entry into the IRFU.

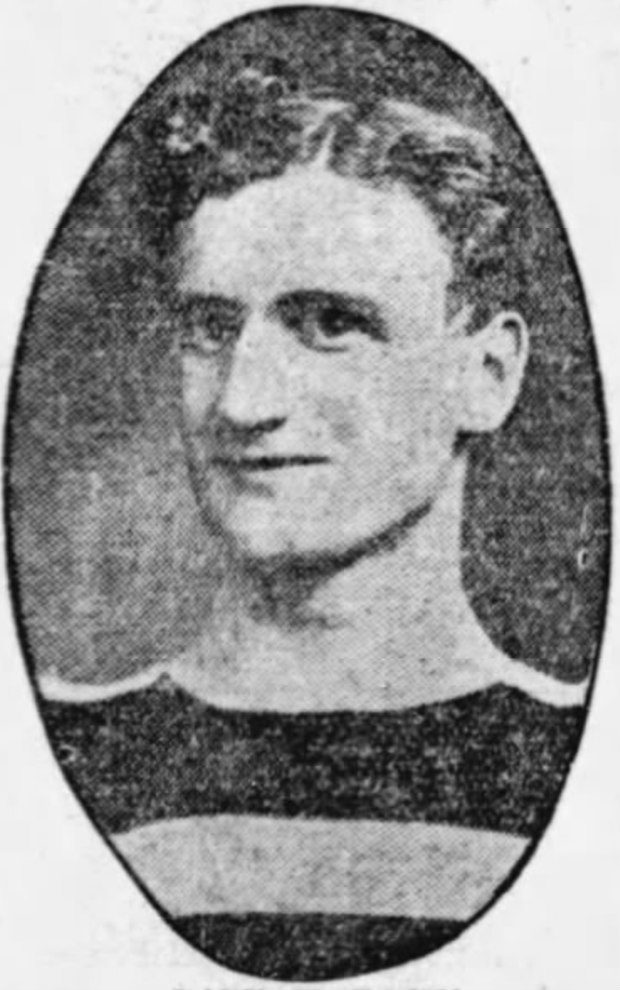
Dave McCann led the Rough Riders to Grey Cup victories in 1925 and 1926.

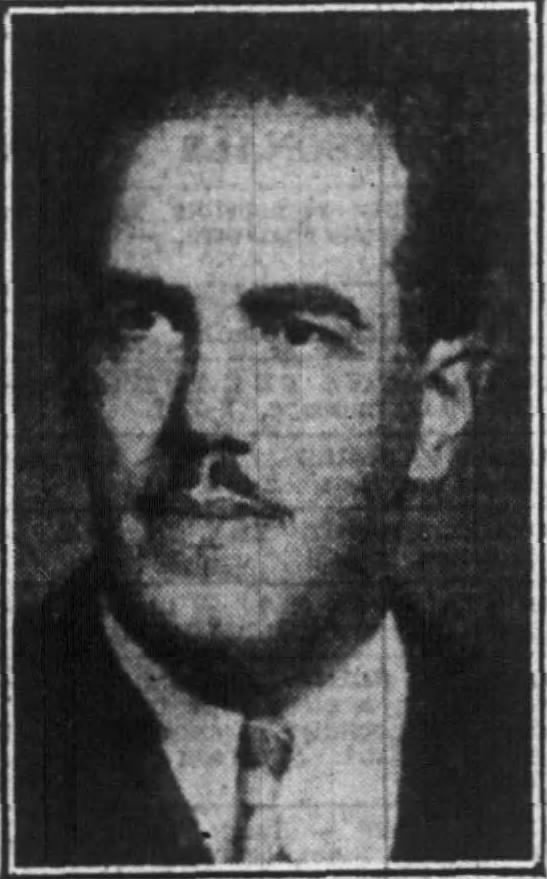
Ross Trimble won the 28th Grey Cup as the team's head coach.

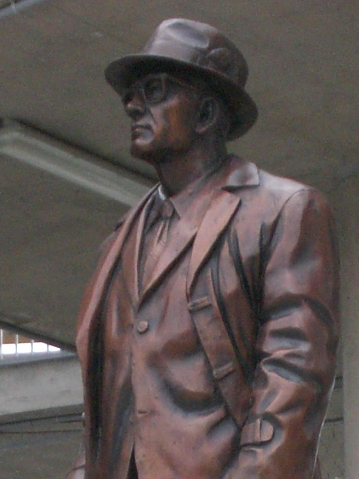
Frank Clair has the most regular season, playoff, and Grey Cup wins as Ottawa's head coach.

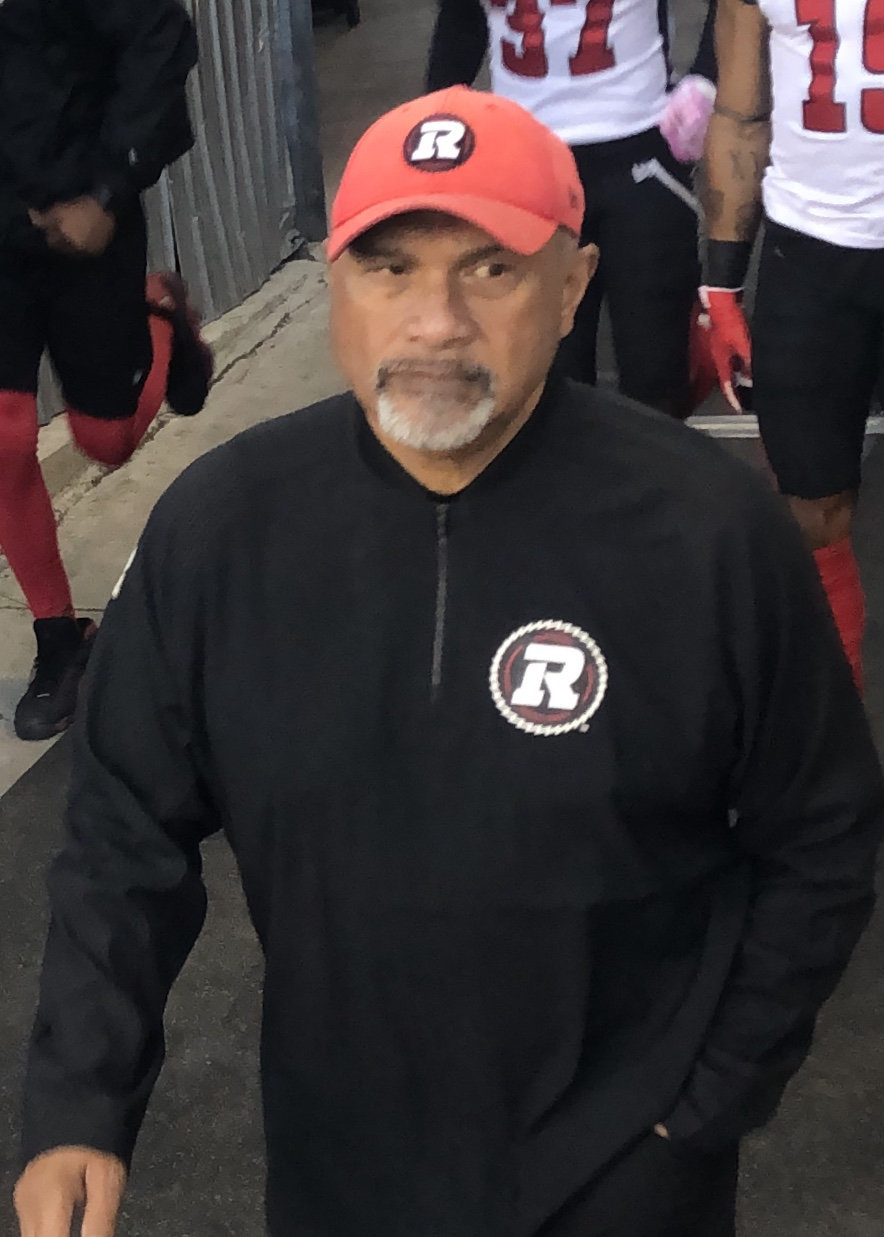
Joe Paopao was the only head coach of the Ottawa Renegades while they were active.

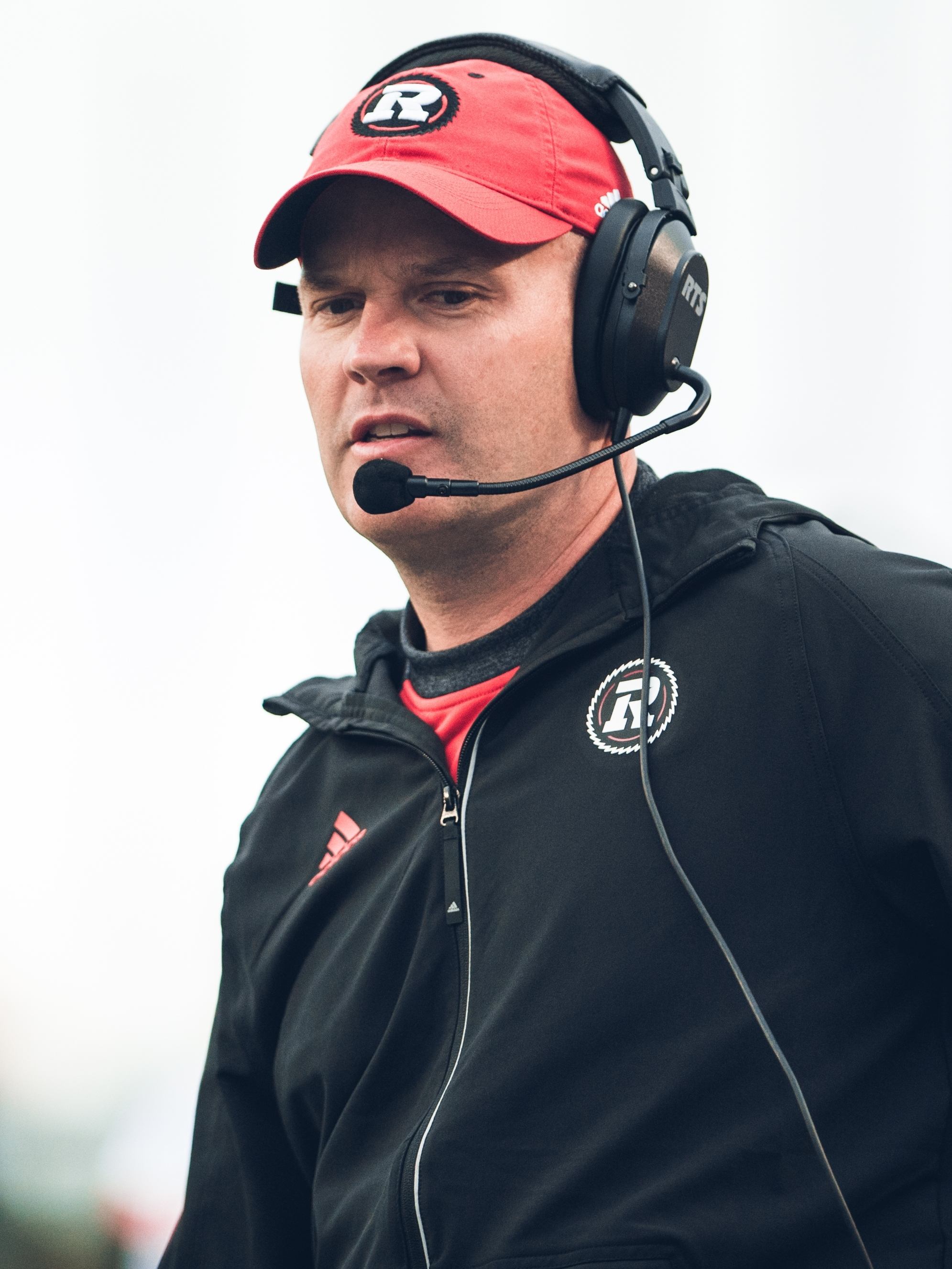
Rick Campbell was the inaugural head coach for the Ottawa Redblacks and won the 104th Grey Cup.

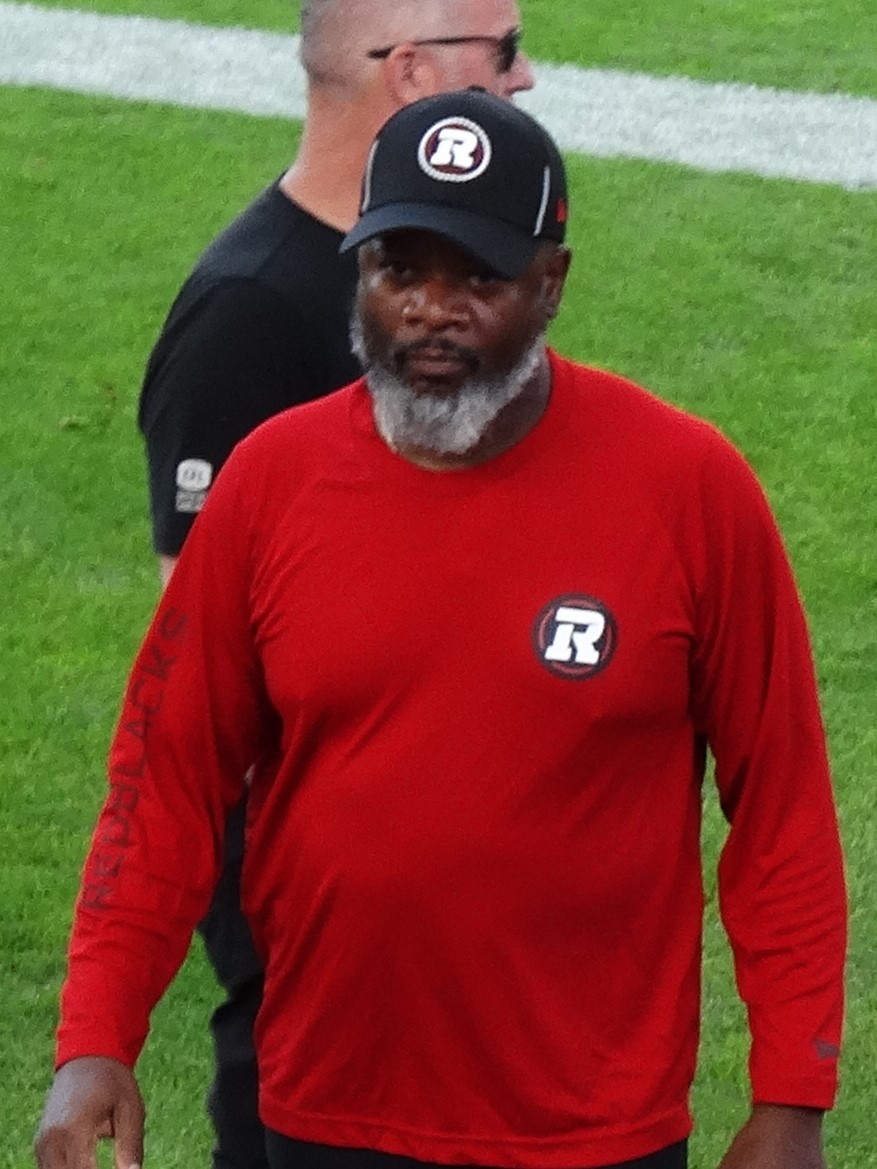
Most recent head coach, Bob Dyce, during the 2022 season.

== Notes ==
- ^{a} A running total of the number of coaches of Ottawa Football Clubs since 1904 (and therefore this is an incomplete list). Any coach who has two or more separate terms as head coach is only counted once.
- ^{b} Each year is linked to an article about that particular CFL season.
