= 1927 Ottawa Senators (CFL) season =

CFL team season

1927 Ottawa Senators season
- Head coach: Dave McCann
- Home stadium: Lansdowne Park

Results
- Record: 3–2–1
- League place: 2nd, IRFU
- Playoffs: Did not qualify

The 1927 Ottawa Senators finished in second place in the Interprovincial Rugby Football Union with a 3–2–1 record, but failed to qualify for the playoffs and defend their Grey Cup title.

== Regular season ==
=== Standings ===
Interprovincial Rugby Football Union
Team	GP	W	L	T	PF	PA	Pts
Hamilton Tigers	6	5	1	0	89	41	10
Ottawa Senators	6	3	2	1	44	47	7
Toronto Argonauts	6	2	3	1	46	56	5
Montreal AAA	6	1	5	0	25	60	2

=== Schedule ===
Week	Date	Opponent	Results	
Week	Date	Opponent	Score	Record
1	Oct 1	vs. Toronto Argonauts	T 10–10	0–0–1
2	Oct 8	at Montreal AAA	W 4–2	1–0–1
3	Oct 15	at Toronto Argonauts	W 13–3	2–0–1
4	Oct 22	vs. Hamilton Tigers	L 7–14	2–1–1
5	Oct 29	vs. Montreal AAA	W 6–3	3–1–1
6	Nov 5	at Hamilton Tigers	L 4–15	3–2–1
