= 1925 Ottawa Senators (CFL) season =

CFL team season

1925 Ottawa Senators season
- Head coach: Dave McCann
- Home stadium: Lansdowne Park

Results
- Record: 4–1–1
- League place: 1st, IRFU
- Playoffs: Won Grey Cup

The 1925 Ottawa Senators finished in first place in the Interprovincial Rugby Football Union with a 4–1–1 record and won the first Grey Cup in franchise history by defeating the Winnipeg Tammany Tigers 24–1 at Lansdowne Park.

== Regular season ==
=== Standings ===
Interprovincial Rugby Football Union
| Team | GP | W | L | T | PF | PA | Pts |
|---|---|---|---|---|---|---|---|
| Ottawa Senators | 6 | 4 | 1 | 1 | 48 | 24 | 9 |
| Montreal AAA Winged Wheelers | 6 | 3 | 3 | 0 | 27 | 43 | 6 |
| Hamilton Tigers | 6 | 2 | 3 | 1 | 37 | 42 | 5 |
| Toronto Argonauts | 6 | 2 | 4 | 0 | 39 | 42 | 4 |

=== Schedule ===
| Week | Date | Opponent | Results | |
| Week | Date | Opponent | Score | Record |
|---|---|---|---|---|
| 1 | Oct 3 | vs. Montreal AAA Winged Wheelers | W 17–1 | 1–0 |
| 2 | Oct 10 | at Toronto Argonauts | L 5–13 | 1–1 |
| 3 | Oct 17 | vs. Toronto Argonauts | W 9–4 | 2–1 |
| 4 | Oct 24 | at Montreal AAA Winged Wheelers | W 7–1 | 3–1 |
| 5 | Nov 7 | at Hamilton Tigers | T 2–2 | 3–1–1 |
| 6 | Nov 14 | vs. Hamilton Tigers | W 8–3 | 4–1–1 |

== Postseason ==
| Round | Date | Opponent | Results | |
| Round | Date | Opponent | Score | Record |
|---|---|---|---|---|
| Eastern Final | Nov 28 | vs. Queen's Golden Gaels | W 11–2 | 5–1–1 |
| Grey Cup | Dec 5 | vs. Winnipeg Tammany Tigers | W 24–1 | 6–1–1 |
