= Eddie Emerson =

Canadian football player (1892–1970)

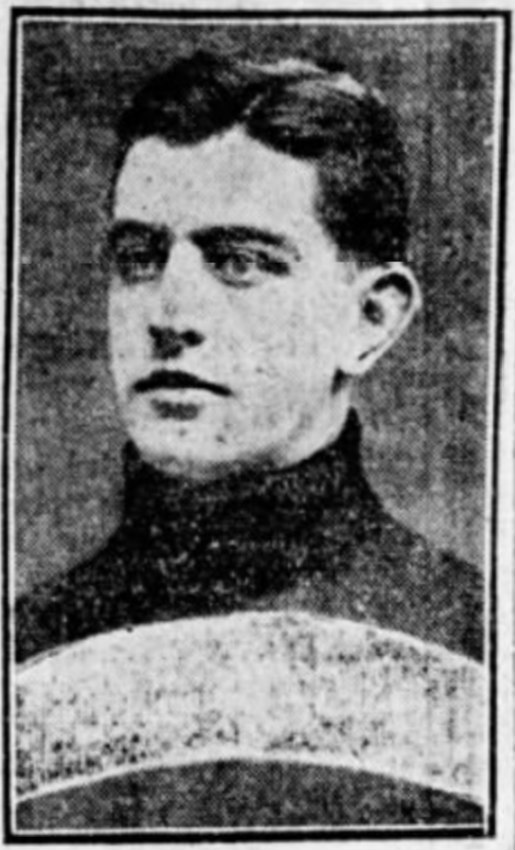

Profile
- Positions: Fullback, Linebacker

Personal information
- Born: March 11, 1892; Cordele, Georgia, U.S.
- Died: January 27, 1970 (aged 77); Ottawa, Ontario, Canada

Career history

Playing
- 1912–1915 1919–1935 1937: Ottawa Rough Riders

Operations
- 1930–1931: Ottawa Rough Riders
- 1947–1951: Ottawa Rough Riders

Awards and highlights
- 2× Grey Cup champion (1925, 1926)
- Canadian Football Hall of Fame (Class of 1963)

Edward Kramer Emerson (March 11, 1892 – January 27, 1970) was a star football player in the Canadian Football League for twenty-two seasons for the Ottawa Rough Riders. Fondly known as the "Iron Man" of football, Emerson led his team to two Grey Cup wins, in 1925 and 1926. After retiring from the field, Emerson stayed with the Rough Riders as president of the football club from 1947 to 1951.

He was inducted into the Canadian Football Hall of Fame in 1963 and into the Canada's Sports Hall of Fame in 1975.
