= 1933 Toronto Argonauts season =

CFL team season

- Head coach: Lew Hayman
- Home stadium: Varsity Stadium

Results
- Record: 4–2
- Division place: 2nd, IRFU
- Playoffs: Won Grey Cup

The 1933 Toronto Argonauts season was the club's 47th season since its inception in 1873 and its 24th season in the Interprovincial Rugby Football Union. The team finished tied with the Montreal Football Club for first place in the IRFU with an identical record of four wins and two losses, resulting in a two-game, total-points tiebreaker series which the Argos won by an aggregate score of 20-9. By virtue of this victory, the club secured its 7th IRFU championship and qualified for the playoffs for the first time since 1922. The ten-year drought was, and continues to be, the longest playoff drought in franchise history.

In the playoffs, the Argonauts won the Grey Cup Semi-Final 13–0 over the Western Canada champion Winnipeg 'Pegs. The Argonauts progressed to face the Ontario Rugby Football Union champion Sarnia Imperials in the 21st Grey Cup game, which was the first, and thus far only, Canadian championship game to be played in Sarnia, Ontario. The Argonauts won the championship and the club's third Grey Cup by a score of 4–3, which ties for the lowest scoring Grey Cup game ever.

== Preseason ==
In the third annual City Championship preseason competition, the Argos reached the final and defeated the University of Toronto to claim the Reg DeGruchy Memorial Trophy for the second straight year.

Game	Date	Opponent	Results		Venue	Attendance
Game	Date	Opponent	Score	Record	Venue	Attendance
A	September 23	St. Michael's College	W 24–0	1–0	Varsity Stadium	10,000
B	September 30	University of Toronto	W 25–1	2–0	Varsity Stadium	12,000

== Regular season ==
Prior to the 1933 season the league recognized that the Montreal Amateur Athletic Association had ended its involvement in the ownership and management of Montreal's Big Four club, thus consigning the Montreal AAA Winged Wheelers to history.

=== Standings ===
Interprovincial Rugby Football Union
Team	GP	W	L	T	PF	PA	Pts
Montreal Football Club	6	4	2	0	67	55	8
Toronto Argonauts	6	4	2	0	86	54	8
Ottawa Rough Riders	6	3	3	0	61	75	6
Hamilton Tigers	6	1	5	0	43	73	2

=== Schedule ===
Week	Game	Date	Opponent	Results		Venue	Attendance
Week	Game	Date	Opponent	Score	Record	Venue	Attendance
1	1	Oct 7	vs. Montreal FC	L 14–18	0–1	Varsity Stadium	11,000
2	2	Oct 14	at Ottawa Rough Riders	L 0–14	0–2	Lansdowne Park	8,000
3	3	Oct 21	at Hamilton Tigers	W 21–2	1–2	Hamilton AAA Grounds	7,000
4	4	Oct 28	vs. Hamilton Tigers	W 11–5	2–2	Varsity Stadium	9,000
5	5	Nov 4	vs. Ottawa Rough Riders	W 21–4	3–2	Varsity Stadium	15,000
6	6	Nov 11	at Montreal FC	W 11–10	4–2	Stade Percival-Molson	4,000

== Postseason ==
The Argonauts were obliged to relocate their home playoff game on November 18 to Hamilton due to the unavailability of Varsity Stadium, where the University of Toronto were hosting Queen's University in the 1933 intercollegiate football final.

Round	Date	Opponent	Results		Venue	Attendance
Round	Date	Opponent	Score	Record	Venue	Attendance
IRFU tie-break Game 1	Nov 18	vs. Montreal FC	W 5–4	1–0	Hamilton AAA Grounds	3,500
IRFU tie-break Game 2	Nov 25	at Montreal FC	W 15–5	2–0	Stade Percival-Molson	1,000
Grey Cup Semi-Final	Dec 2	vs. Winnipegs	W 13–0	3–0	Varsity Stadium	10,000
Grey Cup	Dec 9	at Sarnia Imperials	W 4–3	4–0	Davis Field	4,500

=== Grey Cup ===
December 9 @ Davis Field (Attendance: 2,751)

Team	Q1	Q2	Q3	Q4	Total
Toronto Argonauts	0	0	3	1	4
Sarnia Imperials	0	1	1	1	3
