= 1932 Toronto Argonauts season =

CFL team season

- Head coach: Buck McKenna
- Home stadium: Varsity Stadium

Results
- Record: 3–3
- Division place: 3rd, IRFU
- Playoffs: Did not qualify

The 1932 Toronto Argonauts season was the club's 46th season since its inception in 1873 and its 23rd season in the Interprovincial Rugby Football Union. The team finished in third place in the IRFU with three wins and three losses and failed to qualify for the playoffs. It proved to be the last of Buck McKenna's four seasons as coach of the Argos, who left the job having amassed an overall record of thirteen wins, ten losses and one tie, and never having won the IRFU title.

The Argonauts' top player in 1932 was 22-year-old halfback Ab Box, who joined the team from Balmy Beach, winners of the 1930 Grey Cup, as part of a major retooling of the Argos' backfield.

== Preseason ==
In the second annual City Championship preseason competition, the Argos reached the final and defeated the University of Toronto to claim their first Reg DeGruchy Memorial Trophy.

| Game | Date | Opponent | Results | | Venue | Attendance |
| Game | Date | Opponent | Score | Record | Venue | Attendance |
|---|---|---|---|---|---|---|
| A | September 24 | Toronto Balmy Beach Beachers | W 5–4 (OT) | 1–0 | Varsity Stadium | 6,000 |
| B | October 1 | University of Toronto | W 9–7 | 2–0 | Varsity Stadium | 7,000 |

== Regular season ==
=== Standings ===
Interprovincial Rugby Football Union
| Team | GP | W | L | T | PF | PA | Pts |
|---|---|---|---|---|---|---|---|
| Hamilton Tigers | 6 | 5 | 1 | 0 | 96 | 15 | 10 |
| Montreal Winged Wheelers | 6 | 4 | 2 | 0 | 68 | 32 | 8 |
| Toronto Argonauts | 6 | 3 | 3 | 0 | 56 | 58 | 6 |
| Ottawa Rough Riders | 6 | 0 | 6 | 0 | 24 | 139 | 0 |

=== Schedule ===
| Week | Date | Opponent | Results | |
| Week | Date | Opponent | Score | Record |
|---|---|---|---|---|
| 1 | Oct 8 | vs. Hamilton Tigers | L 2–15 | 0–1 |
| 2 | Oct 15 | at Montreal Winged Wheelers | L 3–11 | 0–2 |
| 3 | Oct 22 | at Ottawa Rough Riders | W 27–6 | 1–2 |
| 4 | Oct 29 | vs. Ottawa Rough Riders | W 15–2 | 2–2 |
| 5 | Nov 5 | vs. Montreal Winged Wheelers | W 8–5 | 3–2 |
| 6 | Nov 12 | at Hamilton Tigers | L 1–19 | 3–3 |
