= 1931 Ottawa Rough Riders season =

Canadian football team season

- Head coach: Dave McCann
- Home stadium: Lansdowne Park

Results
- Record: 0–6
- League place: 4th, IRFU
- Playoffs: Did not qualify

The 1931 Ottawa Rough Riders finished in fourth place in the Interprovincial Rugby Football Union with a 0–6 record and failed to qualify for the playoffs.

== Regular season ==
=== Standings ===
Interprovincial Rugby Football Union
Team	GP	W	L	T	PF	PA	Pts
Montreal AAA Winged Wheelers	6	6	0	0	112	39	12
Hamilton Tigers	6	3	3	0	60	56	6
Toronto Argonauts	6	3	3	0	55	64	6
Ottawa Rough Riders	6	0	6	0	31	98	0

=== Schedule ===
Week	Date	Opponent	Results	
Week	Date	Opponent	Score	Record
1	Oct 10	at Montreal AAA Winged Wheelers	L 6–32	0–1
2	Oct 17	vs. Hamilton Tigers	L 5–9	0–2
3	Oct 24	vs. Toronto Argonauts	L 5–8	0–3
4	Oct 31	at Toronto Argonauts	L 7–24	0–4
5	Nov 7	at Hamilton Tigers	L 7–14	0–5
6	Nov 14	vs. Montreal AAA Winged Wheelers	L 1–12	0–6
