= 1925 Toronto Argonauts season =

CFL team season

- Head coach: Jack O'Connor
- Home stadium: Varsity Stadium

Results
- Record: 2–4
- Division place: 4th, IRFU
- Playoffs: Did not qualify

The 1925 Toronto Argonauts season was the 39th season for the team since the franchise's inception in 1873. The team finished in fourth place in the Interprovincial Rugby Football Union with a 2–4 record and failed to qualify for the playoffs.

== Regular season ==
=== Standings ===
Interprovincial Rugby Football Union
Team	GP	W	L	T	PF	PA	Pts
Ottawa Senators	6	4	1	1	48	24	9
Montreal AAA Winged Wheelers	6	3	3	0	27	43	6
Hamilton Tigers	6	2	3	1	37	42	5
Toronto Argonauts	6	2	4	0	39	42	4

=== Schedule ===
Week	Game	Date	Opponent	Results		Venue
Week	Game	Date	Opponent	Score	Record	Venue
1	1	Sat, Oct 3	at Hamilton Tigers	L 11–14	0–1	HAAA grounds
2	2	Sat, Oct 10	vs. Ottawa Senators	W 13–5	1–1	Varsity Stadium
3	3	Sat, Oct 17	at Ottawa Senators	L 4–9	1–2	Lansdowne Park
4	4	Sat, Oct 24	vs. Hamilton Tigers	W 7–3	2–2	Varsity Stadium
5	5	Sat, Oct 31	at Montreal Winged Wheelers	L 3–6	2–3	MAAA grounds
6	6	Sat, Nov 7	vs. Montreal Winged Wheelers	L 1–5	2–4	Varsity Stadium
