= 1919 Ottawa Rough Riders season =

Canadian football team season

- Head coach: Dave McCann
- Home stadium: Lansdowne Park

Results
- Record: 2–4
- League place: 4th, IRFU
- Playoffs: Did not qualify

The 1919 Ottawa Rough Riders finished in fourth place in the Interprovincial Rugby Football Union with a 2–4 record and failed to qualify for the playoffs.

== Regular season ==
=== Standings ===
Interprovincial Rugby Football Union
Team	GP	W	L	T	PF	PA	Pts
Montreal AAA	6	4	2	0	71	51	8
Toronto Argonauts	6	3	3	0	78	44	6
Hamilton Tigers	6	3	3	0	78	91	6
Ottawa Rough Riders	6	2	4	0	42	83	4

=== Schedule ===
Week	Date	Opponent	Results	
Week	Date	Opponent	Score	Record
1	Oct 4	vs. Montreal AAA	W 10–3	1–0
2	Oct 11	vs. Toronto Argonauts	W 8–1	2–0
3	Oct 18	vs. Hamilton Tigers	L 16–18	2–1
4	Oct 25	at Hamilton Tigers	L 1–15	2–2
5	Nov 1	at Montreal AAA	L 6–15	2–3
6	Nov 8	at Toronto Argonauts	L 1–31	2–4
