= 1924 Ottawa Rough Riders season =

Canadian football team season

- Head coach: Dave McCann
- Home stadium: Lansdowne Park

Results
- Record: 2–4
- League place: 3rd, IRFU
- Playoffs: Did not qualify

The 1924 Ottawa Rough Riders finished in third place in the Interprovincial Rugby Football Union with a 2–4 record and failed to qualify for the playoffs for the 12th consecutive season, the longest such drought in club history. This would also be the last season as the "Rough Riders" before changing to the name "Senators" for the next six seasons.

== Regular season ==
=== Standings ===
Interprovincial Rugby Football Union
| Team | GP | W | L | T | PF | PA | Pts |
|---|---|---|---|---|---|---|---|
| Hamilton Tigers | 6 | 5 | 1 | 0 | 60 | 31 | 10 |
| Toronto Argonauts | 6 | 4 | 2 | 0 | 51 | 39 | 8 |
| Ottawa Rough Riders | 6 | 2 | 4 | 0 | 29 | 33 | 4 |
| Montreal AAA | 6 | 1 | 5 | 0 | 28 | 65 | 2 |

=== Schedule ===
| Week | Date | Opponent | Results | |
| Week | Date | Opponent | Score | Record |
|---|---|---|---|---|
| 1 | Sat, Oct 4 | vs. Toronto Argonauts | L 3–5 | 0–1 |
| 2 | Sat, Oct 11 | at Hamilton Tigers | L 1–6 | 0–2 |
| 3 | Sat, Oct 18 | vs. Hamilton Tigers | L 1–5 | 0–3 |
Bye
| 4 | Sat, Nov 1 | at Montreal AAA | W 10–2 | 1–3 |
| 5 | Sat, Nov 8 | vs. Montreal AAA | W 8–3 | 2–3 |
| 6 | Fri, Nov 14 | at Toronto Argonauts | L 6–12 | 2–4 |
