= 1929 Ottawa Senators (CFL) season =

CFL team season

1929 Ottawa Senators season
- Head coach: Joe Miller
- Home stadium: Lansdowne Park

Results
- Record: 0–6
- League place: 4th, IRFU
- Playoffs: Did not qualify

The 1929 Ottawa Senators finished in fourth place in the Interprovincial Rugby Football Union with a 0–6 record and failed to qualify for the playoffs.

== Regular season ==
=== Standings ===
Interprovincial Rugby Football Union
Team	GP	W	L	T	PF	PA	Pts
Hamilton Tigers	6	5	1	0	120	20	10
Montreal AAA	6	4	2	0	41	40	6
Toronto Argonauts	6	3	3	0	50	35	3
Ottawa Senators	6	0	6	0	12	124	3

=== Schedule ===
Week	Date	Opponent	Results	
Week	Date	Opponent	Score	Record
1	Oct 5	vs. Toronto Argonauts	L 0–8	0–1
2	Oct 12	vs. Montreal AAA	L 2–3	0–2
3	Oct 19	at Hamilton Tigers	L 6–55	0–3
4	Oct 26	at Toronto Argonauts	L 0–14	0–4
5	Nov 2	vs. Hamilton Tigers	L 0–28	0–5
6	Nov 9	at Montreal AAA	L 4–20	0–6
