= Warren Stevens (Canadian football) =

American-born Canadian football player, coach, and administrator

Biographical details
- Born: August 5, 1905; Syracuse, New York
- Died: October 26, 1978 (aged 73); Melbourne, Australia

Playing career

Football
- 1928–1930: Syracuse
- 1931: Montreal AAA Winged Wheelers
- Position: Halfback/Quarterback

Coaching career (HC unless noted)

Football
- 1932–1945: Toronto

Men's ice hockey
- 1933–1935: Toronto

Men's basketball
- 1935–1940: Toronto

Administrative career (AD unless noted)
- 1932–1970: Toronto

Head coaching record
- Overall: 44–26–2 (.625) (Football); 1–3–0 (.250) (Ice hockey); 22–8 (.733) (Men's basketball)

Accomplishments and honors

Championships
- As a player: Grey Cup champion (1931); As a head coach: 3x Yates Cup champion (1932, 1933, and 1936)

Warren Adelbert Stevens (August 6, 1905 – October 26, 1978) was an American-born Canadian football player and coach who was the first player to throw for a touchdown in the Grey Cup. He was also the first full-time director of athletics at a Canadian university.

== Early life ==
Stevens was born in Syracuse, New York on August 6, 1905, to Gordon Warren and Alice Elizabeth Stevens. He attended Eastwood High and Central Technical High School in Syracuse.

== Syracuse University ==
Stevens played three seasons of varsity football, baseball, and basketball at Syracuse University. His college football career ended when he fractured his skull in a game against Colgate.

== Montreal AAA ==
In 1931, Stevens enrolled in McGill University as a graduate student in order to learn about ice hockey. He was asked by the school's football coach, Frank Shaughnessy to teach his players the forward pass, which was legalized in the Canadian game that year. Shaughnessy introduced him to Montreal AAA Winged Wheelers coach Clary Floran. Stevens won the Winged Wheelers quarterback job, led the team to an undefeated regular season and a 22–0 victory over the intercollegiate champion Western to play in the 19th Grey Cup. In that game, Stevens completed a touchdown pass to Kenny Grant – the first in Grey Cup history. Montreal won the game 22–0.

== University of Toronto ==
In 1932, Stevens was appointed director of athletics at the University of Toronto. He was the first full-time director of athletics at a Canadian university. He was head coach of the Toronto Varsity Blues football from 1932 to 1945, compiling a 44–26–2 and winning three Yates Cups (1932, 1933, and 1936). He also coached the Varsity Blues men's ice hockey team from 1933 to 1935 and the men's basketball team from 1935 to 1940. He retired in 1970 and moved to Australia to be closer to his daughter. He died on October 26, 1978, at his home in Melbourne.
