= 1926 Ottawa Senators (CFL) season =

CFL team season

1926 Ottawa Senators season
- Head coach: Dave McCann
- Home stadium: Lansdowne Park

Results
- Record: 5–1
- League place: 1st, IRFU
- Playoffs: Won Grey Cup

The 1926 Ottawa Senators finished in first place in the Interprovincial Rugby Football Union with a 5–1 record and successfully repeated as Grey Cup champions by winning the 14th Grey Cup. It was the second Grey Cup championship won by the franchise and was the first ever repeat by an IRFU team.

== Regular season ==
=== Standings ===
Interprovincial Rugby Football Union
| Team | GP | W | L | T | PF | PA | Pts |
|---|---|---|---|---|---|---|---|
| Ottawa Senators | 6 | 5 | 1 | 0 | 72 | 57 | 10 |
| Hamilton Tigers | 6 | 3 | 3 | 0 | 67 | 45 | 6 |
| Toronto Argonauts | 6 | 3 | 3 | 0 | 53 | 55 | 6 |
| Montreal AAA Winged Wheelers | 6 | 1 | 5 | 0 | 48 | 83 | 2 |

=== Schedule ===
| Week | Date | Opponent | Results | |
| Week | Date | Opponent | Score | Record |
|---|---|---|---|---|
| 1 | Oct 9 | at Hamilton Tigers | W 8–6 | 1–0 |
| 2 | Oct 16 | vs. Toronto Argonauts | W 16–2 | 2–0 |
| 3 | Oct 23 | at Montreal AAA Winged Wheelers | W 13–9 | 3–0 |
| 4 | Oct 30 | vs. Hamilton Tigers | W 9–8 | 4–0 |
| 5 | Nov 6 | vs. Montreal AAA Winged Wheelers | W 26–8 | 5–0 |
| 6 | Nov 13 | at Toronto Argonauts | L 0–24 | 5–1 |

== Postseason ==
| Round | Date | Opponent | Results | |
| Round | Date | Opponent | Score | Record |
|---|---|---|---|---|
| Eastern Final | Nov 20 | vs. Toronto Balmy Beach | W 7–6 | 6–1 |
| Grey Cup | Dec 4 | at Toronto Varsity Blues | W 10–7 | 7–1 |
