= 1921 Ottawa Rough Riders season =

Canadian football team season

- Head coach: Tom Clancy
- Home stadium: Lansdowne Park

Results
- Record: 3–3
- League place: 2nd, IRFU
- Playoffs: Did not qualify

The 1921 Ottawa Rough Riders finished in second place in the Interprovincial Rugby Football Union with a 3–3 record, but failed to qualify for the playoffs.

== Regular season ==
=== Standings ===
Interprovincial Rugby Football Union
Team	GP	W	L	T	PF	PA	Pts
Toronto Argonauts	6	6	0	0	167	35	10
Ottawa Rough Riders	6	3	3	0	77	71	6
Hamilton Tigers	6	3	3	0	102	79	6
Montreal AAA	6	0	6	0	29	190	0

=== Schedule ===
Week	Date	Opponent	Results	
Week	Date	Opponent	Score	Record
1	Oct 1	at Montreal AAA	W 20–5	1–0
2	Oct 8	vs. Hamilton Tigers	W 19–6	2–0
3	Oct 15	at Hamilton Tigers	L 13–15	2–1
4	Oct 22	vs. Montreal AAA	W 28–7	3–1
5	Oct 29	vs. Toronto Argonauts	L 3–11	3–2
6	Bye			
7	Nov 12	at Toronto Argonauts	L 5–28	3–3
