= 1907 Ottawa Rough Riders season =

Canadian football team season

- Head coach: Tom Clancy
- Home stadium: Varsity Oval

Results
- Record: 2–4
- League place: 3rd, IRFU
- Playoffs: Did not qualify

The 1907 Ottawa Rough Riders season was the first season in the newly formed Interprovincial Rugby Football Union after spending the 1906 season in the Quebec Rugby Football Union. The Rough Riders finished in third place with a 2–4 record and failed to qualify for the playoffs. The 1907 season was the fourth season with Tom Clancy as the team's head coach.

== Regular season ==
=== Standings ===
Interprovincial Rugby Football Union
Team	GP	W	L	T	PF	PA	Pts
Montreal Football Club	6	5	1	0	85	33	10
Hamilton Tigers	6	4	2	0	71	50	8
Ottawa Rough Riders	6	2	4	0	78	102	4
Toronto Argonauts	6	1	5	0	63	112	2

=== Schedule ===
Week	Game	Date	Opponent	Results		Attendance	Source
Week	Game	Date	Opponent	Score	Record	Attendance	Source
1	Bye						
2	1	October 12	at Toronto Argonauts	L 17–29	0–1	2,500	Recap
3	2	October 19	vs. Montreal Football Club	L 7–17	0–2	4,000	Recap
4	3	October 26	vs. Toronto Argonauts	W 34–6	1–2	3,000	Recap
5	4	October 31	at Hamilton Tigers	L 8–20	1–3		Recap
6	5	November 2	vs. Hamilton Tigers	W 12–5	2–3	3,000	Recap
7	6	November 9	at Montreal Football Club	L 0–25	2–4	4,000	Recap
