= Billy Christmas =

Canadian ice hockey player (1879-1941)

- Born: February 19, 1879; Montreal, Quebec
- Died: March 25, 1941 (aged 62); Montreal, Quebec
- Years active: 1895–1901
- Known for: Member of Canada's Sports Hall of Fame
- Sports career
- Sport: Amateur Boxing; Ice hockey; Lacrosse; Football
- Club: Montreal AAA
- Team: Montreal Hockey Club; Montreal Lacrosse Club; Britannia Football Club

William Cecil Christmas (February 19, 1879 – March 25, 1941) was an amateur ice hockey, lacrosse and football player for the Montreal Hockey Club, the Montreal Lacrosse Club, and the Britannia Football Club respectively. As a lightweight, he also won a gold medal in boxing in 1899.

== Athletic career ==
Billy Christmas was the third of eight sons born to Thomas Henry "Harry" Christmas and Jane "Jennie" Christmas (née McCaughey).

Christmas began his athletic career with the Westmount Lacrosse Club in the City and Suburban Junior League.

Christmas soon graduated to the intermediate and senior teams of the Montreal Amateur Athletic Association (MAAA), nicknamed the Winged Wheelers for their unique logo that would later be adopted by the Detroit Red Wings. With the MAAA, Christmas played for two teams: the Montreal Hockey Club and the Montreal Lacrosse Club. He also played halfback for the Britannia Football Club.

In 1899 the MAAA sponsored the Amateur Boxing Championships of Canada. Christmas entered the competition as a lightweight. On April 24 he defeated Ben Haynes in the semifinals. Then two nights later he defeated Ed Outlet for the title.

During the 1899–1900 season of the Canadian Amateur Hockey League (CAHL), Christmas was the top scorer for the Winged Wheelers and the league's third leading scorer posting 12 goals in 8 games. The only hockey players to outscore Christmas were two of his friends–Harry Trihey of the Montreal Shamrocks and Russell Bowie of the Montreal Victorias, both future Hockey Hall of Fame members.

== Family life ==
In 1902 Christmas was expected to captain the Britannia Football Team. Instead, he met and fell in love with Ellen "Hattie" Harriet Turk. Though admiring Billy's athleticism, Hattie did not want him to get hurt. As a result, she convinced him to retire from contact sports. They would subsequently marry at Owen Sound, Ontario in 1905.

Billy and Hattie Christmas had four children. Their elder daughter Doris died of a brain tumor at age fifteen. Hattie Christmas died at age 51 from breast cancer.

== Later life and death ==
Using his business and medical connections, Christmas worked to develop a group hospitalization scheme, whereby the poor and middle class could receive health care. Before he could get the project off the ground, however, Christmas, age 62, died of a massive heart attack.

Three days after his death, fellow MAAA member Percy Roberts said Christmas "was the greatest exponent of Canadian sport: rugby, hockey and lacrosse of his time."

In 2015, Christmas was awarded the Order of Sport, marking his induction into the Canada's Sports Hall of Fame.
