= 1932 Ottawa Rough Riders season =

Canadian football team season

- Head coach: Dave McCann
- Home stadium: Lansdowne Park

Results
- Record: 0–6
- League place: 4th, IRFU
- Playoffs: Did not qualify

The 1932 Ottawa Rough Riders finished in fourth place in the Interprovincial Rugby Football Union with a 0–6 record and failed to qualify for the playoffs.

== Regular season ==
=== Standings ===
Interprovincial Rugby Football Union
Team	GP	W	L	T	PF	PA	Pts
Hamilton Tigers	6	5	1	0	96	15	10
Montreal AAA Winged Wheelers	6	4	2	0	68	32	8
Toronto Argonauts	6	3	3	0	56	58	6
Ottawa Rough Riders	6	0	6	0	24	139	0

=== Schedule ===
Week	Date	Opponent	Results	
Week	Date	Opponent	Score	Record
1	Oct 8	vs. Montreal AAA Winged Wheelers	L 12–13	0–1
2	Oct 15	at Hamilton Tigers	L 3–25	0–2
3	Oct 22	vs. Toronto Argonauts	L 6–27	0–3
4	Oct 29	at Toronto Argonauts	L 2–15	0–4
5	Nov 5	vs. Hamilton Tigers	L 0–29	0–5
6	Nov 12	at Montreal AAA Winged Wheelers	L 1–30	0–6
