= 1908 Ottawa Rough Riders season =

Canadian football team season

- Head coach: Tom Clancy
- Home stadium: Lansdowne Park

Results
- Record: 5–1
- League place: 1st, IRFU
- Playoffs: Lost League Playoff

The 1908 Ottawa Rough Riders finished in first place in the Interprovincial Rugby Football Union with a 5–1 record and qualified for the IRFU playoffs for the first time since its inception in the previous year. The Rough Riders were defeated by the Hamilton Tigers in a league playoff.

== Regular season ==
=== Standings ===
Interprovincial Rugby Football Union
Team	GP	W	L	T	PF	PA	Pts
Ottawa Rough Riders	6	5	1	0	114	41	10
Hamilton Tigers	6	5	1	0	131	42	10
Montreal Football Club	6	1	5	0	49	101	2
Toronto Argonauts	6	1	5	0	50	160	2

=== Schedule ===
Game	Date	Opponent	Results	
Game	Date	Opponent	Score	Record
1	Oct 3	vs. Montreal Football Club	W 11–2	1–0
2	Oct 10	at Toronto Argonauts	W 45–11	2–0
3	Oct 17	at Hamilton Tigers	L 7–15	2–1
4	Oct 24	vs. Toronto Argonauts	W 21–2	3–1
5	Oct 31	at Montreal Football Club	W 22–5	4–1
6	Nov 7	vs. Hamilton Tigers	W 8–6	5–1

== Postseason ==
Game	Date	Opponent	Results	
Game	Date	Opponent	Score	Record
IRFU Playoff	Nov 20	at Hamilton Tigers	L 9–11	0–1
