= 1930 Ottawa Senators (CFL) season =

CFL team season

1930 Ottawa Senators season
- Head coach: Dr. Andy Davies
- Home stadium: Lansdowne Park

Results
- Record: 0–6
- League place: 4th, IRFU
- Playoffs: Did not qualify

The 1930 Ottawa Senators finished in fourth place in the Interprovincial Rugby Football Union with a 0–6 record and failed to qualify for the playoffs. This would be the last season that the team would be known as the "Senators" before switching back to the more familiar "Rough Riders" moniker.

== Regular season ==
=== Standings ===
Interprovincial Rugby Football Union
Team	GP	W	L	T	PF	PA	Pts
Hamilton Tigers	6	4	0	2	87	11	10
Toronto Argonauts	6	4	1	1	40	24	6
Montreal AAA Winged Wheelers	6	2	3	1	35	44	6
Ottawa Senators	6	0	6	0	7	90	0

=== Schedule ===
Week	Date	Opponent	Results	
Week	Date	Opponent	Score	Record
1	Oct 4	at Montreal AAA Winged Wheelers	L 0–6	0–1
2	Oct 11	at Hamilton Tigers	L 0–25	0–2
3	Oct 18	vs. Montreal AAA Winged Wheelers	L 3–20	0–3
4	Oct 25	at Toronto Argonauts	L 2–20	0–4
5	Nov 1	vs. Hamilton Tigers	L 1–10	0–5
6	Nov 8	vs. Toronto Argonauts	L 1–9	0–6
