= 1933 Ottawa Rough Riders season =

Canadian football team season

- Head coach: Wally Masters
- Home stadium: Lansdowne Park

Results
- Record: 3–3
- League place: 3rd, IRFU
- Playoffs: Did not qualify

The 1933 Ottawa Rough Riders finished in third place in the Interprovincial Rugby Football Union with a 3–3 record and failed to qualify for the playoffs. The Rough Riders won their first three games of the season, including their first win since 1928, but lost their final three games. Tom Graham was the team captain.

== Regular season ==
=== Standings ===
Interprovincial Rugby Football Union
Team	GP	W	L	T	PF	PA	Pts
Montreal AAA Winged Wheelers	6	4	2	0	67	55	8
Toronto Argonauts	6	4	2	0	86	54	8
Ottawa Rough Riders	6	3	3	0	61	75	6
Hamilton Tigers	6	1	5	0	43	73	2

=== Schedule ===
Week	Date	Opponent	Results	
Week	Date	Opponent	Score	Record
1	Oct 7	at Hamilton Tigers	W 14–13	1–0
2	Oct 14	vs. Toronto Argonauts	W 15–8	2–0
3	Oct 21	vs. Montreal AAA Winged Wheelers	W 9–1	3–0
4	Oct 28	at Montreal AAA Winged Wheelers	L 12–18	3–1
5	Nov 4	at Toronto Argonauts	L 4–21	3–2
6	Nov 11	vs. Hamilton Tigers	L 7–14	3–3
