= Tammany Tiger =

Tammany Tiger may refer to:

- Tammany Hall, a defunct political organization which was frequently depicted by editorial cartoonists as a tiger
- The Winnipeg Tammany Tigers, a Canadian football team which played in the 13th Grey Cup
