= 1929 Toronto Argonauts season =

CFL team season

- Head coach: Buck McKenna
- Home stadium: Varsity Stadium

Results
- Record: 3–3
- Division place: 3rd, IRFU
- Playoffs: Did not qualify

The 1929 Toronto Argonauts season was the 43rd season for the team since the franchise's inception in 1873. The team finished in third place in the Interprovincial Rugby Football Union with a 3–3 record and failed to qualify for the playoffs.

== Regular season ==
=== Standings ===
Interprovincial Rugby Football Union
Team	GP	W	L	T	PF	PA	Pts
Hamilton Tigers	6	5	1	0	120	20	10
Montreal AAA Winged Wheelers	6	4	2	0	41	40	6
Toronto Argonauts	6	3	3	0	50	35	3
Ottawa Senators	6	0	6	0	12	124	3

=== Schedule ===
Game	Date	Opponent	Results	
Game	Date	Opponent	Score	Record
1	Oct 5	at Ottawa Senators	W 8–0	1–0
2	Oct 12	vs. Hamilton Tigers	L 5–6	1–1
3	Oct 19	at Montreal Winged Wheelers	L 6–7	1–2
4	Oct 26	vs. Ottawa Senators	W 14–0	2–2
5	Nov 2	vs. Montreal Winged Wheelers	W 13–6	3–2
6	Nov 9	at Hamilton Tigers	L 4–16	3–3
