= 1922 Ottawa Rough Riders season =

Canadian football team season

- Head coach: Tom Clancy
- Home stadium: Lansdowne Park

Results
- Record: 0–5–1
- League place: 4th, IRFU
- Playoffs: Did not qualify

The 1922 Ottawa Rough Riders finished in fourth place in the Interprovincial Rugby Football Union with a 0–5–1 record and failed to qualify for the playoffs.

== Regular season ==
=== Standings ===
Interprovincial Rugby Football Union
Team	GP	W	L	T	PF	PA	Pts
Toronto Argonauts	6	5	0	1	110	24	11
Hamilton Tigers	6	3	1	2	50	43	8
Montreal AAA	6	2	4	0	43	56	4
Ottawa Rough Riders	6	0	5	1	23	103	1

=== Schedule ===
Week	Game	Date	Opponent	Results	
Week	Game	Date	Opponent	Score	Record
1	1	Sept 30	vs. Hamilton Tigers	L 6–19	0–1
2	2	Oct 7	at Hamilton Tigers	T 6–6	0–1–1
3	3	Oct 14	vs. Montreal AAA	L 8–14	0–2–1
4	4	Oct 21	vs. Toronto Argonauts	L 1–29	0–3–1
5	Bye				
6	5	Nov 4	at Montreal AAA	L 1–14	0–4–1
7	6	Nov 11	at Toronto Argonauts	L 1–22	0–5–1
