= 1924 Toronto Argonauts season =

CFL team season

- Head coach: Jack O'Connor
- Home stadium: Varsity Stadium

Results
- Record: 4–2
- Division place: 2nd, IRFU
- Playoffs: Did not qualify

The 1924 Toronto Argonauts season was the 38th season for the team since the franchise's inception in 1873. The team finished in second place in the Interprovincial Rugby Football Union with a 4–2 record and failed to qualify for the playoffs.

== Regular season ==
=== Standings ===
Interprovincial Rugby Football Union
Team	GP	W	L	T	PF	PA	Pts
Hamilton Tigers	6	5	1	0	60	31	10
Toronto Argonauts	6	4	2	0	51	39	8
Ottawa Senators	6	2	4	0	29	33	4
Montreal AAA Winged Wheelers	6	1	5	0	28	65	2

=== Schedule ===
Week	Game	Date	Opponent	Results	
Week	Game	Date	Opponent	Score	Record
1	1	Sat, Oct 4	at Ottawa Senators	W 5–3	1–0
2	2	Sat, Oct 11	at Montreal Winged Wheelers	L 2–8	1–1
3	3	Sat, Oct 18	vs. Montreal Winged Wheelers	W 14–4	2–1
4	Bye				
5	4	Sat, Nov 1	vs. Hamilton Tigers	W 10–4	3–1
6	5	Sat, Nov 8	at Hamilton Tigers	L 8–14	3–2
7	6	Sat, Nov 15	vs. Ottawa Senators	W 12–6	4–2
