= 1931 Toronto Argonauts season =

CFL team season

- Head coach: Buck McKenna
- Home stadium: Varsity Stadium

Results
- Record: 3–3
- Division place: 3rd, IRFU
- Playoffs: Did not qualify

The 1931 Toronto Argonauts season was the club's 45th season since its inception in 1873 and its 22nd season in the Interprovincial Rugby Football Union. The team finished tied with the Hamilton Tigers for second place in the IRFU with three wins and three losses and failed to qualify for the playoffs.

This was the first IRFU season in which the forward pass was allowed by the rules of the game. The first forward pass completion in Argonauts' history was thrown by halfback Teddy Morris to halfback Bill Darling for a gain of twenty-five yards during the opening game of the season in Hamilton, which the Argos lost 12–7.

The Argonauts' top player in 1931 was halfback Frank Turville, winner of the 1930 Jeff Russel Memorial Trophy, around whose punt-catching, ball-carrying and kicking abilities the Argos' offence revolved. This season also saw the debut of Teddy Morris, future star player, Russel-Trophy winner and multiple Grey-Cup winning head coach of the Argonauts.

== Preseason ==
In 1931 the Argos, Balmy Beach and the University of Toronto launched a new preseason competition for the "city championship", the winning club to receive the Reg DeGruchy Memorial Trophy. The Argos defeated the University reserves squad in the first round, but lost in the final to the Beach, reigning Grey Cup champions.

| Game | Date | Opponent | Results | | Venue | Attendance |
| Game | Date | Opponent | Score | Record | Venue | Attendance |
|---|---|---|---|---|---|---|
| A | September 26 | University of Toronto Orfuns | W 17–5 | 1–0 | Varsity Stadium | 5,000 |
| B | October 3 | Toronto Balmy Beach | L 1–5 | 1–1 | Varsity Stadium | 6,000 |

== Regular season ==
=== Standings ===
Interprovincial Rugby Football Union
| Team | GP | W | L | T | PF | PA | Pts |
|---|---|---|---|---|---|---|---|
| Montreal AAA Winged Wheelers | 6 | 6 | 0 | 0 | 112 | 39 | 12 |
| Hamilton Tigers | 6 | 3 | 3 | 0 | 60 | 56 | 6 |
| Toronto Argonauts | 6 | 3 | 3 | 0 | 55 | 64 | 6 |
| Ottawa Rough Riders | 6 | 0 | 6 | 0 | 31 | 98 | 0 |

=== Schedule ===
| Week | Date | Opponent | Results | |
| Week | Date | Opponent | Score | Record |
|---|---|---|---|---|
| 1 | Oct 10 | at Hamilton Tigers | L 7–12 | 0–1 |
| 2 | Oct 17 | vs. Montreal Winged Wheelers | L 10–32 | 0–2 |
| 3 | Oct 24 | at Ottawa Rough Riders | W 8–5 | 1–2 |
| 4 | Oct 31 | vs. Ottawa Rough Riders | W 24–7 | 2–2 |
| 5 | Nov 7 | at Montreal Winged Wheelers | L 1–4 | 2–3 |
| 6 | Nov 14 | vs. Hamilton Tigers | W 5–4 | 3–3 |
