= 1930 Toronto Argonauts season =

CFL team season

- Head coach: Buck McKenna
- Home stadium: Varsity Stadium

Results
- Record: 4–1–1
- Division place: 2nd, IRFU
- Playoffs: Did not qualify

The 1930 Toronto Argonauts season was the 44th season for the team since the franchise's inception in 1873. The team finished in second place in the Interprovincial Rugby Football Union with a 4–1–1 record and failed to qualify for the playoffs.

== Regular season ==
=== Standings ===
Interprovincial Rugby Football Union
Team	GP	W	L	T	PF	PA	Pts
Hamilton Tigers	6	4	0	2	87	11	10
Toronto Argonauts	6	4	1	1	40	24	9
Montreal AAA Winged Wheelers	6	2	3	1	35	44	6
Ottawa Senators	6	0	6	0	7	90	0

=== Schedule ===
Week	Date	Opponent	Results	
Week	Date	Opponent	Score	Record
1	Oct 11	at Montreal Winged Wheelers	W 2–0	1–0
2	Oct 18	at Hamilton Tigers	L 1–15	1–1
3	Oct 25	vs. Ottawa Senators	W 20–2	2–1
4	Nov 1	vs. Montreal Winged Wheelers	W 5–3	3–1
5	Nov 8	at Ottawa Senators	W 9–1	4–1
6	Nov 15	vs. Hamilton Tigers	T 3–3	4–1–1
