= 1935 Ottawa Rough Riders season =

Canadian football team season

- Head coach: Billy Hughes
- Home stadium: Lansdowne Park

Results
- Record: 5–4
- League place: 3rd, IRFU
- Playoffs: Did not qualify

The 1935 Ottawa Rough Riders finished in third place in the Interprovincial Rugby Football Union with a 5–4 record, but failed to qualify for the playoffs.

== Regular season ==
=== Standings ===
Interprovincial Rugby Football Union
Team	GP	W	L	T	PF	PA	Pts
Hamilton Tigers	9	7	2	0	124	52	14
Toronto Argonauts	9	6	3	0	97	90	12
Ottawa Rough Riders	9	5	4	0	104	98	10
Montreal AAA Winged Wheelers	9	0	9	0	48	133	0

=== Schedule ===
Week	Date	Opponent	Results	
Week	Date	Opponent	Score	Record
1	Sept 21	vs. Montreal AAA Winged Wheelers	W 21–8	1–0
2	Sept 28	at Hamilton Tigers	L 2–12	1–1
3	Oct 5	vs. Toronto Argonauts	L 12–15	1–2
4	Oct 12	at Montreal AAA Winged Wheelers	W 12–9	2–2
5	Oct 19	at Hamilton Tigers	L 12–23	2–3
6	Oct 26	vs. Hamilton Tigers	L 3–10	2–4
7	Nov 2	vs. Montreal AAA Winged Wheelers	W 15–3	3–4
8	Nov 9	at Toronto Argonauts	W 18–13	4–4
9	Nov 16	vs. Toronto Argonauts	W 9–5	5–4
