= 1928 Ottawa Senators (CFL) season =

CFL team season

1928 Ottawa Senators season
- Head coach: Walter Gilhooley
- Home stadium: Lansdowne Park

Results
- Record: 1–4–1
- League place: 4th, IRFU
- Playoffs: Did not qualify

The 1928 Ottawa Senators finished in fourth place in the Interprovincial Rugby Football Union with a 1–4–1 record and failed to qualify for the playoffs.

== Regular season ==
=== Standings ===
Interprovincial Rugby Football Union
Team	GP	W	L	T	PF	PA	Pts
Hamilton Tigers	6	6	0	0	90	22	12
Montreal AAA	6	3	3	0	62	34	6
Toronto Argonauts	6	1	4	1	30	45	3
Ottawa Senators	6	1	4	1	22	103	3

=== Schedule ===
Week	Date	Opponent	Results	
Week	Date	Opponent	Score	Record
1	Oct 6	vs. Montreal AAA	W 10–8	1–0
2	Oct 13	vs. Hamilton Tigers	L 3–20	1–1
3	Oct 20	at Toronto Argonauts	L 0–21	1–2
4	Oct 27	at Montreal AAA	L 0–14	1–3
5	Nov 3	vs. Toronto Argonauts	T 1–1	1–3–1
6	Nov 10	at Hamilton Tigers	L 1–34	1–4–1
