= 1907 Toronto Argonauts season =

CFL team season

- Head coach: W. G. Wood
- Home stadium: Varsity Athletic Field

Results
- Record: 1–5
- Division place: 4th, IRFU
- Playoffs: Did not qualify

The 1907 Toronto Argonauts season was the Argonaut Football Club's tenth season of organized league play since joining the Ontario Rugby Football Union in 1898, and its first season in the newly formed Interprovincial Rugby Football Union. The team finished in last place in the new "Big Four" league with one win and five losses and failed to qualify for the Dominion playoffs.

The formation of the IRFU was the result of intense negotiations during the month of September between representatives of the Argos and the Hamilton Tigers of the ORFU, and the Montreal Football Club and the Ottawa Rough Riders of the Quebec Rugby Football Union. The Argonaut representative in these negotiations was manager W. A. Hewitt. The main sticking point in these negotiations was whether to adopt the strict eligibility requirements for amateur athletes stipulated by the Canadian Amateur Athletic Union (preferred by Toronto and Hamilton) or the looser requirements stipulated by the Amateur Athletic Federation of Canada (preferred by Montreal and Ottawa).

The final decision to proceed with the new organization was not made until October 2, just three days prior to opening day.

Having managed the club to a record of eight wins and four losses in the past two seasons, Hewitt returned for a third season as manager in 1907. On September 30 the club announced the appointment of W. G. Wood as coach.

The Argonauts played the first game in Big Four league history on October 5 against Montreal, losing 17–8 to the eventual Dominion champions.

== Regular season ==
After deciding to join the Big Four, the Ottawa Rough Riders folded as part of a merger with the Ottawa St. Patricks to form the new Ottawa Giants football club. The new club would revert to the "Rough Riders" name the following season.

=== Standings ===
Interprovincial Rugby Football Union
Team	GP	W	L	T	PF	PA	Pts
Montreal FC	6	5	1	0	85	33	10
Hamilton Tigers	6	4	2	0	71	50	8
Ottawa Giants	6	2	4	0	78	102	4
Toronto Argonauts	6	1	5	0	63	112	2

=== Schedule ===
Week	Date	Opponent	Location	Final score	Attendance	Record
1	Oct 5	@ Montreal FC	Montreal AAA Grounds	L 17–8	?	0–1–0
2	Oct 12	Ottawa Giants	Varsity Athletic Field	W 29–17	2,500	1–1–0
3	Oct 19	@ Hamilton Tigers	Hamilton AAA Grounds	L 20–6	?	1–2–0
4	Oct 26	@ Ottawa Giants	Varsity Oval	L 34–6	2,000	1–3–0
5	Oct 31	Montreal FC	Varsity Athletic Field	L 9–7	"a large crowd"	1–4–0
6	Bye					1–4–0
7	Nov 16	Hamilton Tigers	Varsity Athletic Field	L 15–7	"a large crowd"	1–5–0
