= Tom Graham (gridiron football, born 1910) =

American football player (1910–2002)

- Graham, circa 1935

No. 31, 18, 35
- Position: End

Personal information
- Born: October 16, 1910; Oak Lane, Pennsylvania, U.S.
- Died: June 8, 2002 (aged 91); Hewitt, New Jersey, U.S.
- Listed height: 6 ft 3 in (1.91 m)
- Listed weight: 210 lb (95 kg)

Career information
- High school: Alhambra (Alhambra, California)
- College: Temple (1929–1932)

Career history
- Ottawa Rough Riders (1933); Tamaqua Professionals (1934); Philadelphia Eagles (1935); Passaic Reds (1935); Reading Keys (1936); Passaic Red Devils (1936); Baltimore Orioles (1936); Brooklyn Bushwicks (1937); Olney Yellow Jackets (1937)
- Stats at Pro Football Reference

Thomas Herbert Graham (October 16, 1910 – June 8, 2002) was an American professional football end who played for the Philadelphia Eagles of the National Football League (NFL). He played college football at Temple. He was captain of the Ottawa Rough Riders in 1933.

== Early life ==
Thomas Herbert Graham was born on October 16, 1910, in Oak Lane, Pennsylvania. He played high school football at Alhambra High School in Alhambra, California, as a center from 1927 to 1928.

== College career ==
Graham enrolled at Temple University to play college football for the Owls as an end. He played for the freshman team in 1929 and was a three-year varsity letterman from 1930 to 1932. The Philadelphia Inquirer reported that he was "adept at handling forward passes and a place-kicker of better than average ability."

== Professional career ==
In 1933, Graham signed with the Ottawa Rough Riders of the Interprovincial Rugby Football Union (IRFU) to play Canadian football as a middle wing (which corresponds to tackle in American football). On October 2, 1933, five days before the start of the 1933 season, he was appointed line coach of the Rough Riders and would spend the season as a player-coach. On October 4, Graham was named the team captain.

On January 11, 1934, The Hamilton Spectator noted that Graham, who was considered one of the IRFU's best blockers during the 1933 season, was expected to sign with the Hamilton Tigers for the 1934 season. However, this did not happen.

In 1934, Graham played football for the Tamaqua Professionals of Tamaqua, Pennsylvania. In the summer of 1935, he played for a baseball team in Ottawa.

On July 6, 1935, it was reported that Graham had signed with the Philadelphia Eagles of the National Football League (NFL). On September 8, 1935, in a non-league game against the independent Reading Keys, he was pulled from the game by head coach Lud Wray after a poor play. Graham played in two games for the Eagles during the 1935 season as an end before being waived later in September.

By October 18, 1935, Graham had joined the independent Passaic Reds. He played for them during the 1935 season.

Graham began the 1936 season with the independent Reading Keys. He then started all eight league games at end for the American Association's Passaic Red Devils as the team finished with a 3–5 record. On December 18, 1936, Graham signed with the Baltimore Orioles of the Dixie League to replace left tackle Dale Prather for the league title game against the Washington Pros on December 20. The Orioles lost 3–0 to the Pros.

Graham played in four games, starting three, as an end and placekicker for the Brooklyn Bushwicks of the American Association in 1937. He scored one extra point and one field goal. After the Bushwicks season ended, Graham played in a game for the independent Olney Yellow Jackets in late November 1937.

== Personal life ==
Graham served in the United States Army. He died on June 8, 2002, in Hewitt, New Jersey.
