= 1936 Ottawa Rough Riders season =

Canadian football team season

- Head coach: Billy Hughes
- Home stadium: Lansdowne Park

Results
- Record: 3–3
- League place: 2nd, IRFU
- Playoffs: Lost Grey Cup

The 1936 Ottawa Rough Riders finished in second place in the Interprovincial Rugby Football Union with a 3–3 record and qualified for the playoffs for the first time since their 1926 championship season. The Rough Riders defeated the Hamilton Tiger-Cats and Toronto Argonauts in the IRFU post-season, but lost the 24th Grey Cup to the Sarnia Imperials.

== Regular season ==
=== Standings ===
Interprovincial Rugby Football Union
Team	GP	W	L	T	PF	PA	Pts
Toronto Argonauts	6	4	2	0	74	37	8
Ottawa Rough Riders	6	3	3	0	49	63	6
Hamilton Tigers	6	3	3	0	62	71	6
Montreal Indians	6	2	4	0	45	59	4

=== Schedule ===
Week	Date	Opponent	Results	
Week	Date	Opponent	Score	Record
1	Oct 3	vs. Toronto Argonauts	L 1–18	0–1
2	Oct 10	at Toronto Argonauts	L 0–14	0–2
3	Oct 17	vs. Montreal Indians	W 8–7	1–2
4	Oct 24	vs. Hamilton Tigers	W 21–0	2–2
5	Oct 31	at Hamilton Tigers	L 15–21	2–3
6	Nov 7	at Montreal Indians	W 4–3	3–3

== Postseason ==
Round	Date	Opponent	Results	
Round	Date	Opponent	Score	Record
IRFU Semi-Final	Nov 14	vs. Hamilton Tigers	W 3–2	4–3
IRFU Final #1	Nov 21	vs. Toronto Argonauts	W 5–1	5–3
IRFU Final #2	Nov 28	at Toronto Argonauts	W 17–6	6–3
Grey Cup	Dec 5	Sarnia Imperials	L 20–26	8–2
