= 1934 Toronto Argonauts season =

CFL team season

- Head coach: Lew Hayman
- Home stadium: Varsity Stadium

Results
- Record: 3–2–1
- Division place: 2nd, IRFU
- Playoffs: Did not qualify

The 1934 Toronto Argonauts season was the 48th season for the team since the franchise's inception in 1873. The team finished tied for second place in the Big Four with a 3–2–1 record, failing by a single point to qualify for the playoffs and defend their 1933 Grey Cup championship.

== Preseason ==
In the fourth annual City Championship preseason competition, the Argos reached the final and defeated St. Michael's College to claim the Reg DeGruchy Memorial Trophy for the third straight year.

Game	Date	Opponent	Results		Venue	Attendance
Game	Date	Opponent	Score	Record	Venue	Attendance
A	Sept 22	Toronto Balmy Beach	W 17–7	1–0	Varsity Stadium	9,000
B	Sept 29	St. Michael's College	W 7–0	2–0	Varsity Stadium	5,000

== Regular season ==
=== Standings ===
Interprovincial Rugby Football Union
Team	GP	W	L	T	PF	PA	Pts
Hamilton Tigers	6	3	1	2	47	39	8
Toronto Argonauts	6	3	2	1	51	38	7
Montreal Football Club	6	3	2	1	54	42	7
Ottawa Rough Riders	6	1	5	0	34	67	2

=== Schedule ===
Week	Game	Date	Opponent	Results		Venue	Attendance
Week	Game	Date	Opponent	Score	Record	Venue	Attendance
1	1	Oct 6	at Montreal FC	L 2–3	0–1	Stade Percival-Molson	
2	2	Oct 13	vs. Ottawa Rough Riders	W 12–1	1–1	Varsity Stadium	10,000
3	3	Oct 20	vs. Hamilton Tigers	L 9–17	1–2	Varsity Stadium	15,000
4	4	Oct 27	at Hamilton Tigers	T 3–3	1–2–1	Hamilton AAA Grounds	8,500
5	5	Nov 3	at Ottawa Rough Riders	W 14–6	2–2–1	Lansdowne Park	4,500
6	6	Nov 10	vs. Montreal FC	W 11–8	3–2–1	Varsity Stadium	12,000
