= 1936 Toronto Argonauts season =

CFL team season

- Head coach: Lew Hayman
- Home stadium: Varsity Stadium

Results
- Record: 4–2
- Division place: 1st, IRFU
- Playoffs: Lost IRFU Final

The 1936 Toronto Argonauts season was the 50th season for the team since the franchise's inception in 1873. The team finished in first place in the Interprovincial Rugby Football Union for the first time since 1922 with a 4–2 record and qualified for the playoffs, but lost the two-game total-points IRFU Final series to the Ottawa Rough Riders.

== Regular season ==
=== Standings ===
Interprovincial Rugby Football Union
Team	GP	W	L	T	PF	PA	Pts
Toronto Argonauts	6	4	2	0	74	37	8
Ottawa Rough Riders	6	3	3	0	49	63	6
Hamilton Tigers	6	3	3	0	62	71	6
Montreal Indians	6	2	4	0	45	59	4

=== Schedule ===
Week	Date	Opponent	Results	
Week	Date	Opponent	Score	Record
1	Oct 3	at Ottawa Rough Riders	W 18–1	1–0
2	Oct 10	vs. Ottawa Rough Riders	W 14–0	2–0
3	Oct 17	at Hamilton Tigers	L 8–12	2–1
4	Oct 24	vs. Montreal Indians	W 12–4	3–1
5	Oct 31	at Montreal Indians	L 12–14	3–2
6	Nov 7	vs. Hamilton Tigers	W 10–6	4–2

== Postseason ==
Round	Date	Opponent	Results		Venue
Round	Date	Opponent	Score	Record	Venue
IRFU Final Game 1	Nov 21	at Ottawa Rough Riders	L 1–5	0–1	Lansdowne Park
IRFU Final Game 2	Nov 28	vs. Ottawa Rough Riders	L 5–17	0–2	Varsity Stadium
