= Gordie Perry =

Canadian football player

Gordon Perry
Profile
- Position: Running back

Personal information
- Born: March 18, 1903; Moncton, New Brunswick, Canada
- Died: September 19, 2003 (aged 100); Ottawa, Ontario, Canada

Career history
- 1928–1934: Montreal AAA Winged Wheelers

Awards and highlights
- Grey Cup champion (1931); Jeff Russel Memorial Trophy (1931); CFL Eastern All-Star (1932)
- Canadian Football Hall of Fame (Class of 1970)

Clarence Gordon Perry Sr. (March 18, 1903 – September 19, 2003) was a star football player in the Interprovincial Rugby Football Union (predecessor to the Canadian Football League's (CFL) East Division) for the Montreal AAA Winged Wheelers. He was inducted into the Canadian Football Hall of Fame in 1970 and into the Canada's Sports Hall of Fame in 1975.

A multi-sport athlete, Perry was also a life member and past president of the Ottawa Curling Club. Since 1961, the club has held the year-ending "Gordie Perry Bonspiel" in his honour. Perry won the "Royal Jubilee" curling title in 1953 using iron stones, and then won the title again in 1956 using granite. He was also the past president of the Governor General's Curling Club. He was the skip of one of the two Ottawa Curling Club rinks that won the Quebec Challenge Cup in 1957.

Perry, nicknamed the "Galloping Ghost" also played baseball. He played centre-field in the Montreal City Baseball League, where he was a two-time batting champion and led the league in stolen bases five times.

== Personal life ==
Perry worked for the Royal Bank of Canada, and lived on Billings Avenue in Alta Vista, Ottawa and had three children. In addition to football, curling and baseball, he also boxed, swam, did track and field and badminton.
