= 1910 Ottawa Rough Riders season =

Canadian football team season

- Head coach: Tom Clancy
- Home stadium: Lansdowne Park

Results
- Record: 3–3
- League place: 3rd, IRFU
- Playoffs: Did not qualify

The 1910 Ottawa Rough Riders finished in third place in the Interprovincial Rugby Football Union with a 3–3 record and failed to qualify for the playoffs.

== Regular season ==
=== Standings ===
Interprovincial Rugby Football Union
Team	GP	W	L	T	PF	PA	Pts
Hamilton Tigers	6	4	2	0	76	43	8
Toronto Argonauts	6	3	3	0	68	92	6
Ottawa Rough Riders	6	3	3	0	70	66	6
Montreal Football Club	6	2	4	0	74	87	4

=== Schedule ===
Game	Date	Opponent	Results	
Game	Date	Opponent	Score	Record
1	Oct 8	at Hamilton Tigers	L 2–7	0–1
2	Oct 15	vs. Montreal Football Club	L 10–12	0–2
3	Oct 22	vs. Hamilton Tigers	W 17–7	1–2
4	Oct 29	at Toronto Argonauts	L 4–11	1–3
5	Nov 5	vs. Toronto Argonauts	W 23–20	2–3
6	Nov 12	at Montreal Football Club	W 14–9	3–3
