= 1911 Ottawa Rough Riders season =

Canadian football team season

- Head coach: Tom Clancy
- Home stadium: Lansdowne Park

Results
- Record: 3–3
- League place: 3rd, IRFU
- Playoffs: Did not qualify

The 1911 Ottawa Rough Riders finished in third place in the Interprovincial Rugby Football Union with a 3–3 record and failed to qualify for the playoffs.

== Regular season ==
=== Standings ===
Interprovincial Rugby Football Union
Team	GP	W	L	T	PF	PA	Pts
Toronto Argonauts	6	5	1	0	56	31	10
Hamilton Tigers	6	3	3	0	83	57	6
Ottawa Rough Riders	6	3	3	0	61	83	6
Montreal Football Club	6	1	5	0	49	78	2

=== Schedule ===
Week	Date	Opponent	Results	
Week	Date	Opponent	Score	Record
1	Oct 7	vs. Montreal Football Club	W 15–9	1–0
2	Oct 14	at Hamilton Tigers	L 0–33	1–1
3	Oct 21	at Toronto Argonauts	L 4–7	1–2
4	Oct 28	vs. Hamilton Tigers	W 23–9	2–2
5	Nov 4	at Montreal Football Club	W 18–17	3–2
6	Nov 11	vs. Toronto Argonauts	L 1–8	3–3
