= 1935 Toronto Argonauts season =

CFL team season

- Head coach: Lew Hayman
- Home stadium: Varsity Stadium

Results
- Record: 6–3
- Division place: 2nd, IRFU
- Playoffs: Did not qualify

The 1935 Toronto Argonauts season was the 49th season for the team since the franchise's inception in 1873. The team began the season with six consecutive wins, something that they would not do again until 2023, but lost their three remaining games of the season to finish in second place in the Interprovincial Rugby Football Union, thus failing to qualify for the Grey Cup game.

== Regular season ==
=== Standings ===
Interprovincial Rugby Football Union
| Team | GP | W | L | T | PF | PA | Pts |
|---|---|---|---|---|---|---|---|
| Hamilton Tigers | 9 | 7 | 2 | 0 | 124 | 52 | 14 |
| Toronto Argonauts | 9 | 6 | 3 | 0 | 97 | 90 | 12 |
| Ottawa Rough Riders | 9 | 5 | 4 | 0 | 104 | 98 | 10 |
| Montreal AAA Winged Wheelers | 9 | 0 | 9 | 0 | 48 | 133 | 0 |

=== Schedule ===
| Week | Date | Opponent | Results | |
| Week | Date | Opponent | Score | Record |
|---|---|---|---|---|
| 1 | Sept 21 | vs. Hamilton Tigers | W 13–8 | 1–0 |
| 2 | Sept 28 | at Montreal AAA Winged Wheelers | W 4–2 | 2–0 |
| 3 | Oct 5 | at Ottawa Rough Riders | W 15–12 | 3–0 |
| 4 | Oct 12 | vs. Hamilton Tigers | W 7–1 | 4–0 |
| 5 | Oct 19 | at Montreal AAA Winged Wheelers | W 14–7 | 5–0 |
| 6 | Oct 26 | vs. Montreal AAA Winged Wheelers | W 18–12 | 6–0 |
| 7 | Nov 2 | at Hamilton Tigers | L 8–21 | 6–1 |
| 8 | Nov 9 | vs. Ottawa Rough Riders | L 13–18 | 6–2 |
| 9 | Nov 16 | at Ottawa Rough Riders | L 5–9 | 6–3 |
