= 1934 Ottawa Rough Riders season =

Canadian football team season

- Head coach: Wally Masters
- Home stadium: Lansdowne Park

Results
- Record: 1–5
- League place: 4th, IRFU
- Playoffs: Did not qualify

The 1934 Ottawa Rough Riders finished in fourth place in the Interprovincial Rugby Football Union with a 1–5 record and failed to qualify for the playoffs.

== Regular season ==
=== Standings ===
Interprovincial Rugby Football Union
Team	GP	W	L	T	PF	PA	Pts
Hamilton Tigers	6	3	1	2	47	39	8
Montreal AAA Winged Wheelers	6	3	2	1	54	42	7
Toronto Argonauts	6	3	2	1	51	38	7
Ottawa Rough Riders	6	1	5	0	34	67	2

=== Schedule ===
Week	Date	Opponent	Results	
Week	Date	Opponent	Score	Record
1	Oct 6	vs. Hamilton Tigers	L 1–9	0–1
2	Oct 13	at Toronto Argonauts	L 1–12	0–2
3	Oct 20	at Montreal AAA Winged Wheelers	W 6–4	1–2
4	Oct 27	vs. Montreal AAA Winged Wheelers	L 15–18	1–3
5	Nov 3	vs. Toronto Argonauts	L 6–14	1–4
6	Nov 10	at Hamilton Tigers	L 5–10	1–5
