= 1937 Toronto Argonauts season =

CFL team season

- Head coach: Lew Hayman
- Home stadium: Varsity Stadium

Results
- Record: 5–1
- Division place: 1st, IRFU
- Playoffs: Won Grey Cup

The 1937 Toronto Argonauts season was the 51st season for the team since the franchise's inception in 1873. The team finished in first place in the Interprovincial Rugby Football Union with a 5–1 record and qualified for the playoffs for the second consecutive season. The Argonauts defeated the Ottawa Rough Riders in a two-game total-points IRFU Final series before winning the Eastern Final over the Sarnia Imperials. The Argonauts faced the Winnipeg Blue Bombers in the 25th Grey Cup game, which was the first of many meetings by the two franchises in the championship game. The Argonauts won the franchise's fourth Grey Cup championship by a score of 4–3, which ties for the lowest scoring Grey Cup game ever.

== Preseason ==
Game	Date	Opponent	Results		Venue	Attendance
Game	Date	Opponent	Score	Record	Venue	Attendance
A	Sept 25	vs. Queen's University	W 14–0	1–0	Varsity Stadium	5,000

== Regular season ==
=== Standings ===
Interprovincial Rugby Football Union
Team	GP	W	L	T	PF	PA	Pts
Toronto Argonauts	6	5	1	0	72	43	10
Ottawa Rough Riders	6	3	3	0	52	46	6
Hamilton Tigers	6	2	4	0	42	63	4
Montreal Indians	6	2	4	0	35	49	4

=== Schedule ===
Week	Date	Opponent	Results	
Week	Date	Opponent	Score	Record
1	Oct 9	at Hamilton Tigers	W 17–16	1–0
2	Oct 16	vs. Montreal Indians	W 14–0	2–0
3	Oct 23	vs. Ottawa Rough Riders	W 10–4	3–0
4	Oct 30	at Ottawa Rough Riders	W 11–7	4–0
5	Nov 6	at Montreal Indians	L 2–11	4–1
6	Nov 13	vs. Hamilton Tigers	W 18–5	5–1

== Postseason ==
Round	Date	Opponent	Results		Venue
Round	Date	Opponent	Score	Record	Venue
IRFU Final Game 1	Nov 20	at Ottawa Rough Riders	L 11–15	0–1	Lansdowne Park
IRFU Final Game 2	Nov 27	vs. Ottawa Rough Riders	W 10–1	1–1	Maple Leaf Stadium
Eastern Final	Dec 4	vs. Sarnia Imperials	W 10–6	2–1	Varsity Stadium
Grey Cup	Dec 11	vs. Winnipeg Blue Bombers	W 4–3	3–1	Varsity Stadium

=== Grey Cup ===
December 10 @ Varsity Stadium (Attendance: 11,522)

Team	Q1	Q2	Q3	Q4	Total
Winnipeg Blue Bombers	1	1	0	1	3
Toronto Argonauts	3	1	0	0	4
