= 1908 Toronto Argonauts season =

CFL team season

- Head coach: Fred Russell/Art Kent
- Home stadium: Rosedale Field

Results
- Record: 1–5
- Division place: 4th, IRFU
- Playoffs: Did not qualify

The 1908 Toronto Argonauts season was the Argonaut Football Club's 11th season of organized league play since joining the Ontario Rugby Football Union in 1898, and its second season in the Interprovincial Rugby Football Union. The team finished in last place in the "Big Four" league with one win and five losses and failed to qualify for the Dominion playoffs.

Soon after the end of the 1907 season all but three of the Argos' regulars abandoned the Double Blue, along with manager Billy Hewitt and coach Billy Wood, to become founding members of the new Toronto Amateur Athletic Club. Following the example of the influential Montreal Amateur Athletic Association, the TAAC established a new football team, the Toronto Crimson, with a roster that Hewitt built by raiding the Argos and other local clubs. In September the Crimson applied for Big Four membership and challenged the severely weakened Argos to a "test match" for the right to represent Toronto in the league. When the application was rejected the TAAC team joined the ORFU.

Bringing back former manager Fred Thompson to manage the club and naming centre Fred "Banty" Russell as player-coach, the Argos devoted the 1908 season to intensive rebuilding efforts. On Thanksgiving Day (November 9) they met the Crimson in a challenge match for the city championship billed as the Battle of Rosedale, which finished in a 15–15 tie.

== Regular season ==
=== Standings ===
Interprovincial Rugby Football Union
Team	GP	W	L	T	PF	PA	Pts
Ottawa Rough Riders	6	5	1	0	114	41	10
Hamilton Tigers	6	5	1	0	131	42	10
Montreal Football Club	6	1	5	0	49	101	2
Toronto Argonauts	6	1	5	0	50	160	2

=== Schedule ===
Week	Date	Opponent	Location	Final score	Record
1	Oct 3	@ Hamilton Tigers	Hamilton AAA Grounds	L 42–2	0–1–0
2	Oct 10	Ottawa Rough Riders	Rosedale Field	L 45–11	0–2–0
3	Oct 17	@ Montreal Football Club	Montreal AAA Grounds	W 19–13	1–2–0
4	Oct 24	@ Ottawa Rough Riders	Varsity Oval	L 21–2	1–3–0
5	Oct 31	Hamilton Tigers	Rosedale Field	L 28–9	1–4–0
6	Nov 7	Montreal Football Club	Rosedale Field	L 13–7	1–5–0
