= 1927 Toronto Argonauts season =

CFL team season

- Head coach: Frank Knight
- Home stadium: Maple Leaf Stadium

Results
- Record: 2–3–1
- Division place: 3rd, IRFU
- Playoffs: Did not qualify

The 1927 Toronto Argonauts season was the 41st season for the team since the franchise's inception in 1873. The team finished in third place in the Interprovincial Rugby Football Union with a 2–3–1 record and failed to qualify for the playoffs.

== Regular season ==
=== Standings ===
Interprovincial Rugby Football Union
| Team | GP | W | L | T | PF | PA | Pts |
|---|---|---|---|---|---|---|---|
| Hamilton Tigers | 6 | 5 | 1 | 0 | 89 | 41 | 10 |
| Ottawa Senators | 6 | 3 | 2 | 1 | 44 | 47 | 7 |
| Toronto Argonauts | 6 | 2 | 3 | 1 | 46 | 56 | 5 |
| Montreal AAA Winged Wheelers | 6 | 1 | 5 | 0 | 25 | 60 | 2 |

=== Schedule ===
The Argonauts' home game on November 12 was played at Varsity Stadium.

| Week | Game | Date | Opponent | Results | |
| Week | Game | Date | Opponent | Score | Record |
|---|---|---|---|---|---|
| 1 | 1 | Sat, Oct 1 | at Ottawa Senators | T 10–10 | 0–0–1 |
| 2 | Bye | | | | |
| 3 | 2 | Sat, Oct 15 | vs. Ottawa Senators | L 3–13 | 0–1–1 |
| 4 | 3 | Sat, Oct 22 | at Montreal Winged Wheelers | L 2–3 | 0–2–1 |
| 5 | 4 | Sat, Oct 29 | at Hamilton Tigers | L 6–21 | 0–3–1 |
| 6 | 5 | Sat, Nov 5 | vs. Montreal Winged Wheelers | W 10–8 | 1–3–1 |
| 7 | 6 | Sat, Nov 12 | vs. Hamilton Tigers | W 13–1 | 2–3–1 |
