= 1928 Toronto Argonauts season =

CFL team season

- Head coach: Frank Knight
- Home stadium: Varsity Stadium

Results
- Record: 1–4–1
- Division place: 3rd, IRFU
- Playoffs: Did not qualify

The 1928 Toronto Argonauts season was the 42nd season for the team since the franchise's inception in 1873. The team finished in third place in the Interprovincial Rugby Football Union with a 1–4–1 record and failed to qualify for the playoffs.

== Regular season ==
=== Standings ===
Interprovincial Rugby Football Union
Team	GP	W	L	T	PF	PA	Pts
Hamilton Tigers	6	6	0	0	90	22	12
Montreal AAA Winged Wheelers	6	3	3	0	62	34	6
Toronto Argonauts	6	1	4	1	30	45	3
Ottawa Senators	6	1	4	1	22	103	3

=== Schedule ===
Game	Date	Opponent	Results	
Game	Date	Opponent	Score	Record
1	Oct 6	vs. Hamilton Tigers	L 0–6	0–1
2	Oct 13	at Montreal Winged Wheelers	L 6–13	0–2
3	Oct 20	vs. Ottawa Senators	W 20–3	1–2
4	Oct 27	at Hamilton Tigers	L 2–14	1–3
5	Nov 3	at Ottawa Senators	T 1–1	1–3–1
6	Nov 10	vs. Montreal Winged Wheelers	L 1–8	1–4–1
