= 1919 Toronto Argonauts season =

CFL team season

- Head coach: Sinc McEvenue
- Home stadium: Varsity Stadium

Results
- Record: 3–3
- Division place: 2nd, IRFU
- Playoffs: Did not qualify

The 1919 Toronto Argonauts season was the 33rd season for the team since the franchise's inception in 1873. The team finished in second place in the Interprovincial Rugby Football Union with a 3–3 record and failed to qualify for the playoffs.

== Regular season ==
=== Standings ===
Interprovincial Rugby Football Union
Team	GP	W	L	T	PF	PA	Pts
Montreal AAA Winged Wheelers	6	4	2	0	71	51	8
Toronto Argonauts	6	3	3	0	78	44	6
Hamilton Tigers	6	3	3	0	78	91	6
Ottawa Senators	6	2	4	0	42	83	4

=== Schedule ===
Game	Date	Opponent	Results	
Game	Date	Opponent	Score	Record
1	Oct 4	vs. Hamilton Tigers	W 30–11	1–0
2	Oct 11	at Ottawa Senators	L 1–8	1–1
3	Oct 18	at Montreal Winged Wheelers	W 4–3	2–1
4	Oct 25	vs. Montreal Winged Wheelers	L 6–12	2–2
5	Nov 1	at Hamilton Tigers	L 6–9	2–3
6	Nov 8	vs. Ottawa Senators	W 31–1	3–3
