= 1913 Ottawa Rough Riders season =

Canadian football team season

- Head coach: Reverend Father Stanton
- Home stadium: Lansdowne Park

Results
- Record: 4–2
- League place: 2nd, IRFU
- Playoffs: Did not qualify

The 1913 Ottawa Rough Riders finished in second place in the Interprovincial Rugby Football Union with a 4–2 record and failed to qualify for the playoffs.

== Regular season ==
=== Standings ===
Interprovincial Rugby Football Union
Team	GP	W	L	T	PF	PA	Pts
Hamilton Tigers	6	5	1	0	143	37	10
Ottawa Rough Riders	6	4	2	0	84	87	8
Toronto Argonauts	6	3	3	0	101	87	6
Montreal Football Club	6	0	6	0	27	144	0

=== Schedule ===
Week	Date	Opponent	Results	
Week	Date	Opponent	Score	Record
1	Oct 4	at Montreal Football Club	W 21–4	1–0
2	Oct 11	vs. Hamilton Tigers	W 11–10	2–0
3	Oct 18	at Toronto Argonauts	T 10–10	2–0
4	Oct 25	at Hamilton Tigers	L 3–23	2–1
5	Nov 1	vs. Toronto Argonauts	W 18–11	3–1
6	Nov 8	vs. Montreal Football Club	W 19–9	4–1
7	Nov 15	at Toronto Argonauts	L 12–30	4–2

(*) The October 18 game versus Toronto that ended in a tie was replayed on Nov 15 and did not count towards the standings.
