= 1942 Ottawa Rough Riders season =

Canadian football team season

- Head coach: George Fraser
- Home stadium: Lansdowne Park

Results
- Record: 3–1
- Division place: 1st, OCSRFU
- Playoffs: Lost in OCSRFU Final

The 1942 Ottawa Rough Riders finished in first place in the Ottawa City Senior Rugby Football Union with a 3–1 record while the Interprovincial Rugby Football Union suspended operations due to World War II. The Rough Riders lost the OCSRFU Final to the Ottawa RCAF Uplands.

== Regular season ==
=== Standings ===
OCSRFU
Team	GP	W	L	T	PF	PA	Pts
Ottawa Rough Riders	4	3	1	0	66	13	6
Ottawa RCAF Uplands	4	3	1	0	53	31	6
Ottawa Civil Service	4	0	4	0	8	83	0

=== Schedule ===
Week	Date	Opponent	Results	
Week	Date	Opponent	Score	Record
1	Oct 10	Ottawa RCAF Uplands	W 17–0	1–0
2	Oct 24	Ottawa Civil Service	W 43–0	2–0
3	Oct 31	Ottawa RCAF Uplands	L 6–13	2–1
4	Nov 14	Ottawa Civil Service	W 6–0	3–1

== Postseason ==
=== Playoffs ===
Round	Date	Opponent	Results	
Round	Date	Opponent	Score	Record
OCSRFU Final #1	Nov 21	Ottawa RCAF Uplands	L 0–9	0–1
