= 1914 Ottawa Rough Riders season =

Canadian football team season

- Head coach: Eddie Girard
- Home stadium: Lansdowne Park

Results
- Record: 0–6
- League place: 4th, IRFU
- Playoffs: Did not qualify

The 1914 Ottawa Rough Riders finished in fourth place in the Interprovincial Rugby Football Union with a 0–6 record and failed to qualify for the playoffs. This was the first time in franchise history that the Rough Riders finished without a win in regular season play.

== Regular season ==
=== Standings ===
Interprovincial Rugby Football Union
Team	GP	W	L	T	PF	PA	Pts
Hamilton Tigers	6	5	1	0	105	34	10
Toronto Argonauts	6	5	1	0	145	47	10
Montreal Football Club	6	2	4	0	62	108	4
Ottawa Rough Riders	6	0	6	0	39	162	0

=== Schedule ===
Week	Date	Opponent	Results	
Week	Date	Opponent	Score	Record
1	Oct 10	vs. Montreal Football Club	L 7–18	0–1
2	Oct 17	at Montreal Football Club	L 11–21	0–2
3	Oct 24	vs. Hamilton Tigers	L 14–24	0–3
4	Oct 31	at Toronto Argonauts	L 2–30	0–4
5	Nov 7	vs. Toronto Argonauts	L 4–47	0–5
6	Nov 14	at Hamilton Tigers	L 1–22	0–6
