= 19th Grey Cup =

1931 Canadian Football championship game

Regina Roughriders	Montreal AAA Winged Wheelers
(4–0)	(6–0)
0	22
Head coach: Al Ritchie	Head coach: Clary Foran
	1	2	3	4	Total
Regina Roughriders	0	0	0	0	0
Montreal AAA Winged Wheelers	7	0	6	9	22
- Date: December 5, 1931
- Stadium: Percival Molson Memorial Stadium
- Location: Montreal
- Referee: Joe O'Brien
- Attendance: 5,112

The 19th Grey Cup was the 1931 Canadian Rugby Union championship game that was played at Percival Molson Memorial Stadium in Montreal, between the Regina Roughriders and the Montreal AAA Winged Wheelers. The hometown Winged Wheelers shut-out the Roughriders 22–0.

== Path to the Grey Cup ==
=== Montreal AAA Winged Wheelers ===
After going 6–0 in the Interprovincial Rugby Football Union regular season, Montreal earned a bye to the Eastern final. There they shutout the Western Ontario Mustangs 22–0, clinching a spot in the Grey Cup game. Montreal's running back Gordon Perry won the Jeff Russel Memorial Trophy as the IRFU MVP.

The Winged Wheelers were looking to become the first team from outside of Ontario to raise the Grey Cup trophy.

=== Regina Roughriders ===
Regina were just as dominant as Montreal during the regular season and playoffs. They dispatched the Winnipeg St.John's 47–5 in the Western Semi-Finals, and then beat the Calgary Altomahs-Tigers 26–2 in the West Final.

There was a considerable pressure on the Roughriders team heading into the contest. This was the fourth straight year that they voyaged East to challenge for the Grey Cup, losing the three previous occasions (scoring a disappointing nine points in those games). They did not fare much better at the fourth time of asking.

== Pre-game ==
There was controversy during the week leading up to the game. The Canadian Rugby Union named Howie Milne as the head official for the matchup. However, Montreal's management took exception to the selection, as Milne was from Regina and even rode the train with the Roughriders team to Montreal. Moreover, Milne had played for the Roughriders up until 1928. This was the first time a western referee had ever been selected to preside over a Grey Cup game. Montreal launched a protest, and the union relented, naming Joe O'Brien as the head referee the night before the game. Milne was moved to umpire, while Tom Barton was appointed as the head linesman.

The game was played in some of the worst conditions in Grey Cup history. During the evening prior to kickoff, there was a heavy snowstorm, leaving large ice patches on the field. With the turf rock hard, the game kicked off with the temperature hovering around −9 °C.

The weather did little to help attendance, as a disappointing 5,112 fans turned out to Percival Molson Memorial Stadium.

With the turf in dismal condition, Fred Wilson, the manager of the Roughriders, organized for pairs of lacrosse shoes to be sent to his team. The shoes somehow found their way into the Montreal dressing room, meaning that the visiting team had unintentionally supplied their opponents with excellent footwear for the icy conditions.

Unbeknownst to Wilson, Regina head coach Al Ritchie had employed a Montreal shoemaker to attach leather cleats to the Roughriders' shoes. However, Ritchie's plan was foiled by the snowstorm, meaning that the Winged Wheelers had a major advantage out of the gate because of their footwear.

== Game summary ==
Montreal opened the scoring on their first possession of the game, with Wally Whitty kicking the ball out for a deadline point. Before teams struggled in the miserable conditions until midway through the quarter. Regina's Eddie James fumbled a snap on his own 35-yard line, and Pete Jotkus dribbled on the ball into the end zone. Huck Welch kicked the convert, and Montreal held a 7–0 lead.

There was no scoring to speak of in the second quarter. The Winged Wheelers had the best chance, when Bernard Haynes nearly intercepted a pass from Curt Schave. Had he held on to the ball, it would have been an easy touchdown.

Neither team experienced much offensive success early in the third quarter. Montreal extended their lead by scoring a rouge. After a two-and-out, Welch ran the punt back to Regina's 27-yard line. Stevens then passed to Grant, who maneuvered his way into the end zone for the first offensive touchdown of the game. Welch would miss the convert, but the Winged Wheelers held a 13-point advantage.

Montreal started off the fourth quarter by dominating the field position. After electing to punt from Regina's 30-yard line on their first drive, Welch knocked in a field goal from 29 yards out. The Roughriders struggled the move the ball, only accumulating 24 yards and one first down in the final quarter. An interception by Bert Adams led to Stevens' second touchdown pass of the game. This time he found Wally Whitty, who scampered into the end zone untouched. Stevens then ran in the extra point himself, giving Montreal a 22-point lead which they would hold to the final whistle.

The freezing and icy conditions took its toll on both teams. Only seven forward passes were completed during the game, while the teams combined for nine fumbles, seven of which were committed by the victorious Montreal side.

With the win, the Winged Wheelers were the first team based outside of Ontario to claim the Grey Cup. Additionally, their 1931 victory was the first national championship for Montreal football teams since 1907.

== Trivia ==
- To date, this is the only Grey Cup game ever hosted by Percival Molson Stadium. Of the first 42 Grey Cups, the 19th was the sole match held outside of Ontario. The next Grey Cup played in Montreal was the 57th Grey Cup at the Autostade in 1969.

- Immediately following the final whistle, Montreal's Edward "Red" Tellier knocked-out Regina's George Gilhooley with a punch to the jaw. Tellier was upset after some illegal blows during the game, but waited until after match to confront Gilhooley. Tellier was suspended for life by the Canadian Rugby Union, but would be reinstated in 1934.

- This game also marked the first time that use of a forward pass was allowed by the Canadian Rugby Union. Consequentially, the first touchdown pass in Grey Cup history was from Montreal's Warren Stevens. Kenny Grant made the catch late in the third quarter, giving his team a 13–0 lead.

- Three players who participated in the game would go on to be inducted into the Canadian Football Hall of Fame; Eddie James from Regina (1963), and Huck Welch (1964) and Gordon Perry (1970) of Montreal. Regina head coach Al Ritchie was also inducted as a builder in 1963.

== See also ==
- 1931 in Canadian Football
