= 1912 Ottawa Rough Riders season =

Canadian football team season

- Head coach: Doc Galvin
- Home stadium: Lansdowne Park

Results
- Record: 4–2
- League place: 2nd, IRFU
- Playoffs: Did not qualify

The 1912 Ottawa Rough Riders finished in second place in the Interprovincial Rugby Football Union with a 4–2 record and failed to qualify for the playoffs.

== Regular season ==
=== Standings ===
Interprovincial Rugby Football Union
Team	GP	W	L	T	PF	PA	Pts
Toronto Argonauts	6	5	1	0	78	56	10
Ottawa Rough Riders	6	4	2	0	77	65	8
Hamilton Tigers	6	3	3	0	90	66	6
Montreal Football Club	6	0	6	0	54	112	0

=== Schedule ===
Week	Game	Date	Opponent	Results	
Week	Game	Date	Opponent	Score	Record
1	1	Oct 5	at Hamilton Tigers	W 21–17	1–0
2	Bye				
3	2	Oct 19	vs. Hamilton Tigers	W 12–7	2–0
4	3	Oct 26	at Montreal Football Club	W 14–0	3–0
4	4	Oct 28	vs. Montreal Football Club	W 13–6	4–0
5	5	Nov 2	vs. Toronto Argonauts	L 6–12	4–1
6	6	Nov 9	at Toronto Argonauts	L 11–23	4–2
