= 1915 Ottawa Rough Riders season =

Canadian football team season

- Head coach: Frank Shaughnessy
- Home stadium: Lansdowne Park

Results
- Record: 2–3
- League place: 3rd, IRFU
- Playoffs: Did not qualify

The 1915 Ottawa Rough Riders finished in third place in the Interprovincial Rugby Football Union with a 2–3 record and failed to qualify for the playoffs.

== Regular season ==
=== Standings ===
Interprovincial Rugby Football Union
Team	GP	W	L	T	PF	PA	Pts
Hamilton Tigers	6	6	0	0	125	23	12
Toronto Argonauts	5	3	2	0	69	49	6
Ottawa Rough Riders	5	2	3	0	54	50	4
Montreal Football Club	6	0	6	0	10	136	0

=== Schedule ===
Week	Date	Opponent	Results	
Week	Date	Opponent	Score	Record
1	Oct 9	at Montreal Football Club	W 18–2	1–0
2	Oct 16	vs. Montreal Football Club	W 20–5	2–0
3	Oct 23	at Toronto Argonauts	L 9–17	2–1
4	Oct 30	vs. Hamilton Tigers	L 5–19	2–2
5	Nov 6	vs. Toronto Argonauts	L 15–19*	2–2
6	Nov 13	at Hamilton Tigers	L 2–7	2–3

(*) The November 6 game won by Toronto over Ottawa was called because of darkness and protested by Ottawa. IRFU executives upheld the protest and declared the game no-contest.
