= 1937 Ottawa Rough Riders season =

Canadian football team season

- Head coach: Ross Trimble
- Home stadium: Lansdowne Park

Results
- Record: 3–3
- League place: 2nd, IRFU
- Playoffs: Lost in IRFU Finals

The 1937 Ottawa Rough Riders finished in second place in the Interprovincial Rugby Football Union with a 3–3 record, but lost in the IRFU Finals to the Toronto Argonauts in a total point series 26–21.

== Regular season ==
=== Standings ===
Interprovincial Rugby Football Union
Team	GP	W	L	T	PF	PA	Pts
Toronto Argonauts	6	5	1	0	72	43	10
Ottawa Rough Riders	6	3	3	0	52	46	6
Hamilton Tigers	6	2	4	0	42	63	4
Montreal Indians	6	2	4	0	35	49	4

=== Schedule ===
Week	Date	Opponent	Results	
Week	Date	Opponent	Score	Record
1	Oct 9	at Montreal Indians	L 7–16	0–1
2	Oct 16	vs. Hamilton Tigers	W 11–0	1–1
3	Oct 23	at Toronto Argonauts	L 4–10	1–2
4	Oct 30	vs. Toronto Argonauts	L 7–11	1–3
5	Nov 6	at Hamilton Tigers	W 14–4	2–3
6	Nov 13	vs. Montreal Indians	W 9–5	3–3

== Postseason ==
Round	Date	Opponent	Results	
Round	Date	Opponent	Score	Record
IRFU Final #1	Nov 20	Toronto Argonauts	W 15–11	5–2
IRFU Final #2	Nov 27	Toronto Argonauts	L 1–10	5–3
