= Jack O'Connor (Canadian football) =

Profile
- Position: Halfback

Career history

Playing
- 1911–15, 1919–22: Toronto Argonauts

Coaching
- 1923–25: Toronto Argonauts

Dr. Jack O'Connor was a Canadian football player and coach who was the head coach of Toronto Argonauts from 1923 to 1925.
