= Montreal AAA =

Amateur athletic association

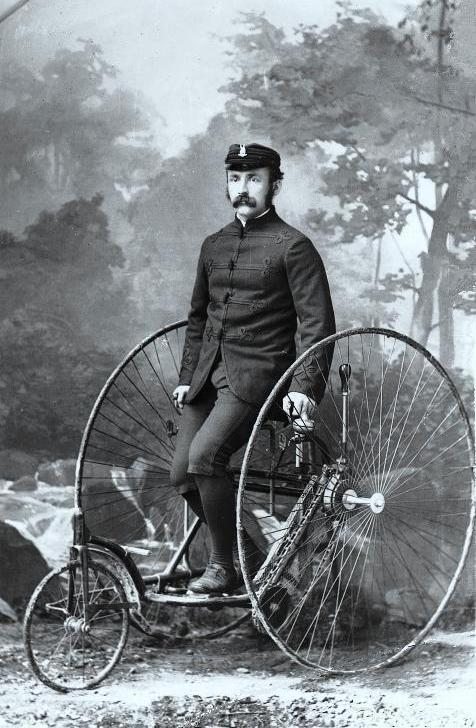
Mr. McLeod, Bicycle Club, Montreal, QC, 1885

Montreal Amateur Athletic Association is Canada's oldest athletic association, located in Montreal, Quebec. It was renamed as the Club Sportif MAA or just MAA (Montreal MAA) in 1999 after a brush with bankruptcy, but is still widely known as the MAAA. In the late 19th and early 20th centuries, the MAA was one of the most important sporting institutions in Canada, and North America, with affiliated teams winning ice hockey's Stanley Cup and Canadian football's Grey Cup.

== History ==
The Montreal Amateur Athletic Association came into existence June 1881 and began as a confederation of three sporting clubs: The Montreal Snow Shoe Club, The Montreal Bicycle Club, and The Montreal Lacrosse Club. These founding clubs shared the club space of the Montreal Gymnasium, located at Mansfield Street and de Maisonneuve Boulevard.

In the 1880s, the MAAA organized the famous annual Montreal Winter Carnival. The Winter Carnival featured a temporary "ice castle" or "ice fort", which would be "stormed" in a mock attack, as well as several events, such as snowshoe races, toboggan slides, skating carnivals and ice hockey tournaments. The Sir Vincent Meredith Trophy was awarded to the best all-round athlete in the MAAA.

The current clubhouse was opened in 1905, on Peel Street in downtown Montreal, in the current commercial district. Due to problems with an aging population, the club switched from being solely member-financed during the revival of 1999. The high taxes on the clubhouse property in central Montreal exacerbated their problems.

W. R. Granger served two years as the president Montreal AAA from 1918 to 1920, and hosted The Prince of Wales at the clubhouse on a royal visit in November 1919. By the end of World War I, Granger had overseen the revival of the association's ice hockey, baseball and soccer teams; and hoped to restart the lacrosse team, establish a trapshooting club, and erect a memorial for members who died serving in the war.

== Historic teams ==
=== Ice hockey ===
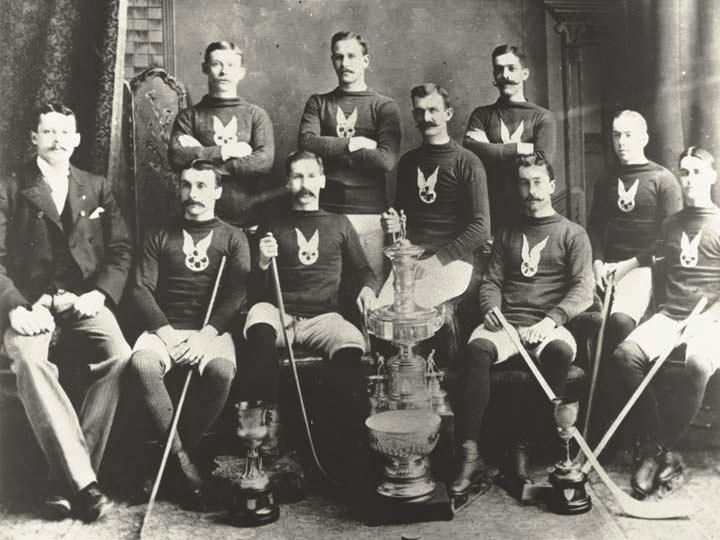
The Montreal Hockey Club as the first Stanley Cup champions

The Montreal Hockey Club (MHC) was an ice hockey team that played in the Amateur Hockey Association of Canada (AHAC) 1886–1898, the Canadian Amateur Hockey League 1898–1905 and the Eastern Canada Amateur Hockey Association 1905–1908, the Inter-Provincial Amateur Hockey Union from 1908 afterward. The team won the AHAC title from 1888 until 1894, and won the Canadian Amateur Hockey League title in 1902. It was the first club to be presented with the Stanley Cup, in 1893. They won again in 1894, March 1902 and February 1903.

The 1902 team was known as the "Little Men of Iron". After the 1903 season, players from the team formed the core of the Montreal Wanderers professional club, who took on the "Little Men" nickname. After withdrawing from play with professional teams, the MHC club continued as an amateur club after 1908, winning the Allan Cup in 1930.

The Montreal AAA had withdrawn from several competitive sports by the early 1930s. In October 1932, its directors announced its ice hockey team would separate from the association, and be operated by E. S. Hamilton and G. T. Ogilvie as the Royal Montreal Hockey Club, pending acceptance by the Quebec Amateur Hockey Association.

=== Canadian football ===
The Montreal AAA sponsored the Montreal Football Club, established on April 8, 1872, which joined the Quebec Rugby Football Union in 1883, and used the AAA grounds to play its games. In 1919, the Montreal AAA Winged Wheelers were formed, playing for 17 seasons until 1935, and won the 19th Grey Cup in 1931, defeating the Regina Roughriders by a 22–0 score.

== Athletic achievements ==
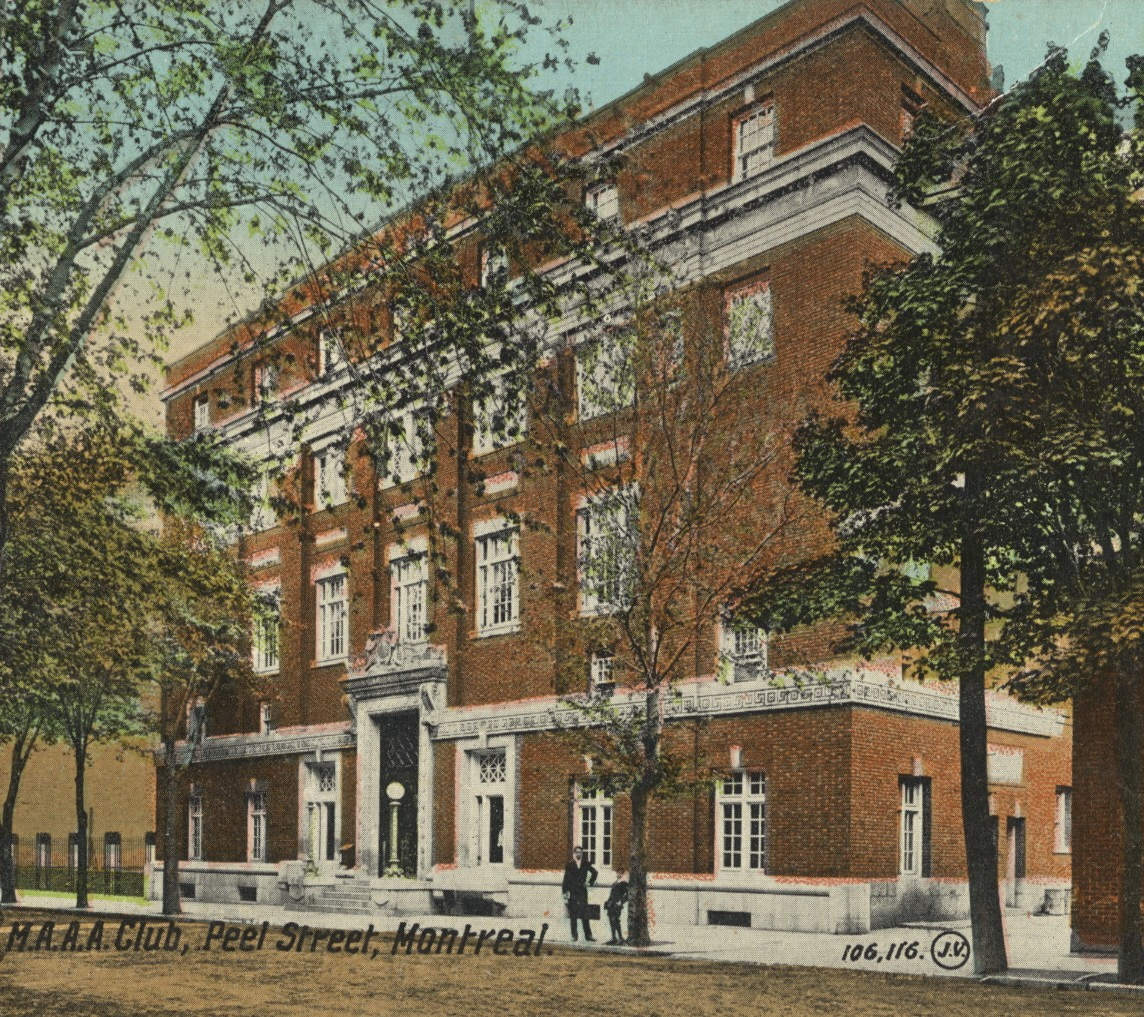
Montreal AAA clubhouse c. 1913

- 1893 – Montreal Hockey Club wins its first Stanley Cup
- 1894 – Montreal Hockey Club wins its second Stanley Cup
- 1902 – Montreal Hockey Club wins its third Stanley Cup
- 1903 – Montreal Hockey Club wins challenge to part-holder of title for 1903 Stanley Cup
- 1904 – Étienne Desmarteau wins the gold medal in weight-throwing at the 1904 Summer Olympics
- 1912 – George Hodgson wins two gold medals in the 1912 Olympics
- 1920 – Russell Wheeler becomes the Canadian Speed Skating Champion
- 1930 – M.A.A.A. ice hockey team wins the 1930 Allan Cup
- 1931 – Montreal AAA Winged Wheelers football team wins the 19th Grey Cup
- 2002 – Nathalie Lambert inducted into Canada's Sports Hall of Fame
- 2015 – William Cecil "Billy" Christmas inducted into Canada's Sports Hall of Fame
