= 13th Grey Cup =

1925 Canadian Football championship game

Winnipeg Tammany Tigers	Ottawa Senators
1	24
Head coach: Leland 'Tote' Mitchell	Head coach: Dave McCann
	1	2	3	4	Total
Winnipeg Tammany Tigers	0	0	1	0	1
Ottawa Senators	5	8	0	11	24
- Date: December 5, 1925
- Stadium: Lansdowne Park
- Location: Ottawa
- Attendance: 6,900

The 13th Grey Cup was played on December 5, 1925, before 6,900 fans at the Lansdowne Park at Ottawa.

The Ottawa Senators defeated the Winnipeg Tammany Tigers 24–1.
