= Buck McKenna =

Canadian football coach

Buck McKenna was a Canadian football coach who was the head coach of Toronto Argonauts from 1929–1932.
