= 14th Grey Cup =

1926 Canadian Football championship game

| Ottawa Senators | Toronto Varsity Blues |
|---|---|
| (5–1) | (2–2) |
| 10 | 7 |
| Head coach: Dave McCann | Head coach: Ron McPherson |
| | 1 | 2 | 3 | 4 | Total |
|---|---|---|---|---|---|
| Ottawa Senators | 7 | 0 | 3 | 0 | 10 |
| Toronto Varsity Blues | 2 | 4 | 0 | 1 | 7 |
- Date: December 4, 1926
- Stadium: Varsity Stadium
- Location: Toronto
- Attendance: 8,276

The 14th Grey Cup was played on December 4, 1926, before 8,276 fans at the Varsity Stadium at Toronto.

The Ottawa Senators defeated the Toronto Varsity Blues 10–7.

Joe Miller was the star of the game, scoring three vital late games "rouges" (single points) and staving off two critical potential turnovers.
