= Tom Clancy (Canadian football) =

Canadian football player and coach

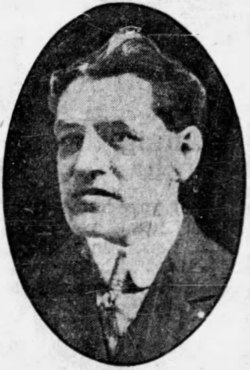
- Clancy pictured as the Ottawa Rough Riders head coach in the 1900s

Profile
- Positions: Coach, Center

Personal information
- Born: December 2, 1872; Ireland
- Died: September 28, 1938 (aged 65)

Career information
- College: St. Laurent College, Ottawa College

Career history

Playing
- 1894–1899, 1903: Ottawa

Coaching
- 1890s–1903, 1918: Ottawa
- 1904–1911, 1913, 1919 (Asst.), 1921–1922: Ottawa Rough Riders

Operations
- 1904: Canadian Rugby Union; Vice President
- late 1920s–early 1930s: Ottawa Rough Riders; Team President

Awards and highlights
- 4x Dominion Championship winner (1894, 1896, 1897, 1901)

Thomas Francis "King" Clancy (December 2, 1872 – September 28, 1938) was a Canadian football player and coach. He was originally a baseball player before becoming a football player in 1894. He was the coach of the Ottawa Rough Riders from 1904 to 1911, 1913, and 1921 to 1922 (and an assistant in 1919). Clancy was known as "The original King", since his son, Frank Clancy was known as King Clancy.

== Early life ==
Tom Clancy was born on December 2, 1872, in Ireland. He was raised in Naugatuck, Connecticut.

== Baseball career ==
Clancy was a noted baseball player in the late 1800s along with his two brothers, Michael and William. He went to St. Laurent College but moved to Ottawa College because he heard they had a better baseball team.

== Football career ==
=== Ottawa College ===
In 1894, he changed sports from baseball to football. He learned football from his coach at Ottawa College, Father Michael Fallon. He led his team to a win in the Dominion Championship of Queen's University (8 to 7) in his first season. He would go on to play in the championship 6 more times (1 with the Rough Riders) and win 4. He was a player-coach.

=== Ottawa Rough Riders (1st and 2nd stints) ===
In 1904, he was hired by the Ottawa Rough Riders to be their head coach. He remained there until 1912, when he retired. Only to return in 1913, retire again, and make returns in 1921 and 22 (Clancy also was an assistant in 1919).

=== Ottawa College (2nd stint) ===
In 1918, he made a return to football by being a coach for the Ottawa Gee-Gees.

=== Ottawa Rough Riders (3rd and 4th stints) ===
Clancy returned to the Rough Riders in 1919, after being persuaded by the manager. He was only an assistant though. In 1921 he returned to being head coach, and stayed until 1922, when he retired. He would later visit the players and give them "pep" talks at practice.

== Later life ==
After his playing and coaching career, he was an executive. He was the team president of the Rough Riders in the late 1920s and early 1930s and also was the president of the "Big Four". Clancy enjoyed going to his son's hockey games after he retired. He died on September 28, 1938, after a long illness.
