= Dave McCann (Canadian football) =

Canadian football player (1889–1959)

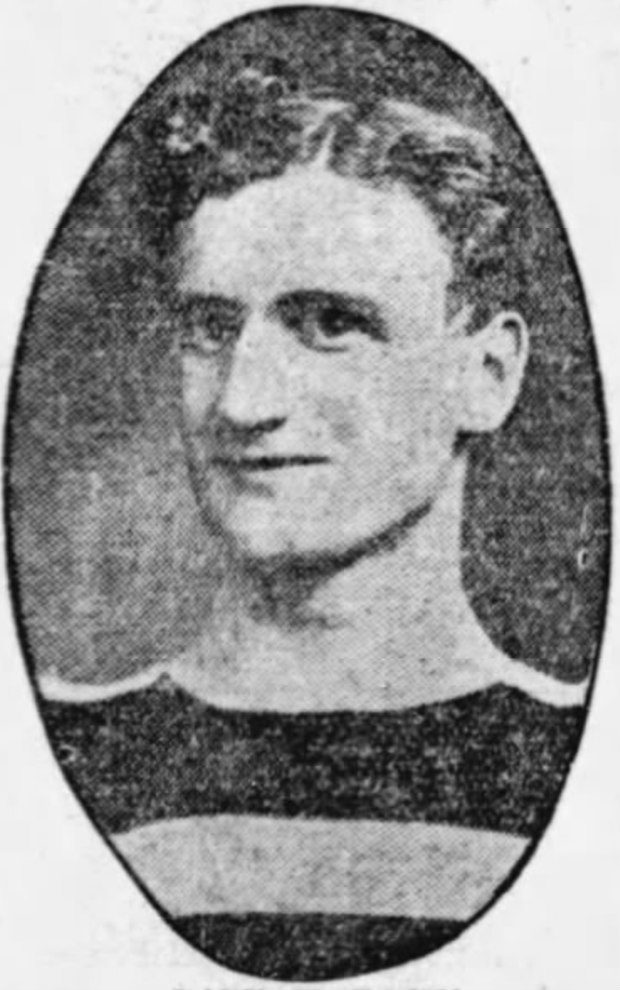
- McCann circa 1909
- Born: David McCann; February 5, 1889; Carleton Place, Ontario, Canada
- Died: March 27, 1959 (aged 70); Ottawa, Ontario, Canada
- Occupations: CFL player, official, coach, Canadian Rugby Union President, Rules Committee Chairman

David McCann (February 5, 1889 – March 27, 1959) was a Canadian Football League player, official, coach, and executive who was elected to the Canadian Football Hall of Fame in 1966.

== Biography ==
Born in Ottawa, McCann quarterbacked the Ottawa Rough Riders football team from 1907 until the outbreak of World War I. Upon his return, he was an official and then coached the Ottawa team to their first Grey Cup championships in 1925 and 1926. McCann also played an important role in the development of Canadian football as President of the Canadian Rugby Union and long-time Chairman of the Rules Committee. It was during McCann's tenure that the forward pass was introduced to Canadian football and the 12th man added. McCann remained on the Rules Committee as late as 1958.

He was elected to the Canadian Football Hall of Fame in 1966.

His brother Daniel was municipal politician in Ottawa.
