= Montreal AAA Winged Wheelers =

Canadian football team

General information
- Founded: 1911; 115 years ago
- Folded: 1935; 91 years ago
- Stadium: Montreal AAA Grounds
- Headquartered: Montreal, Quebec, Canada
- Colours

Personnel
- Owner: Montreal AAA

League / conference affiliations
- IRFU (1911-35)

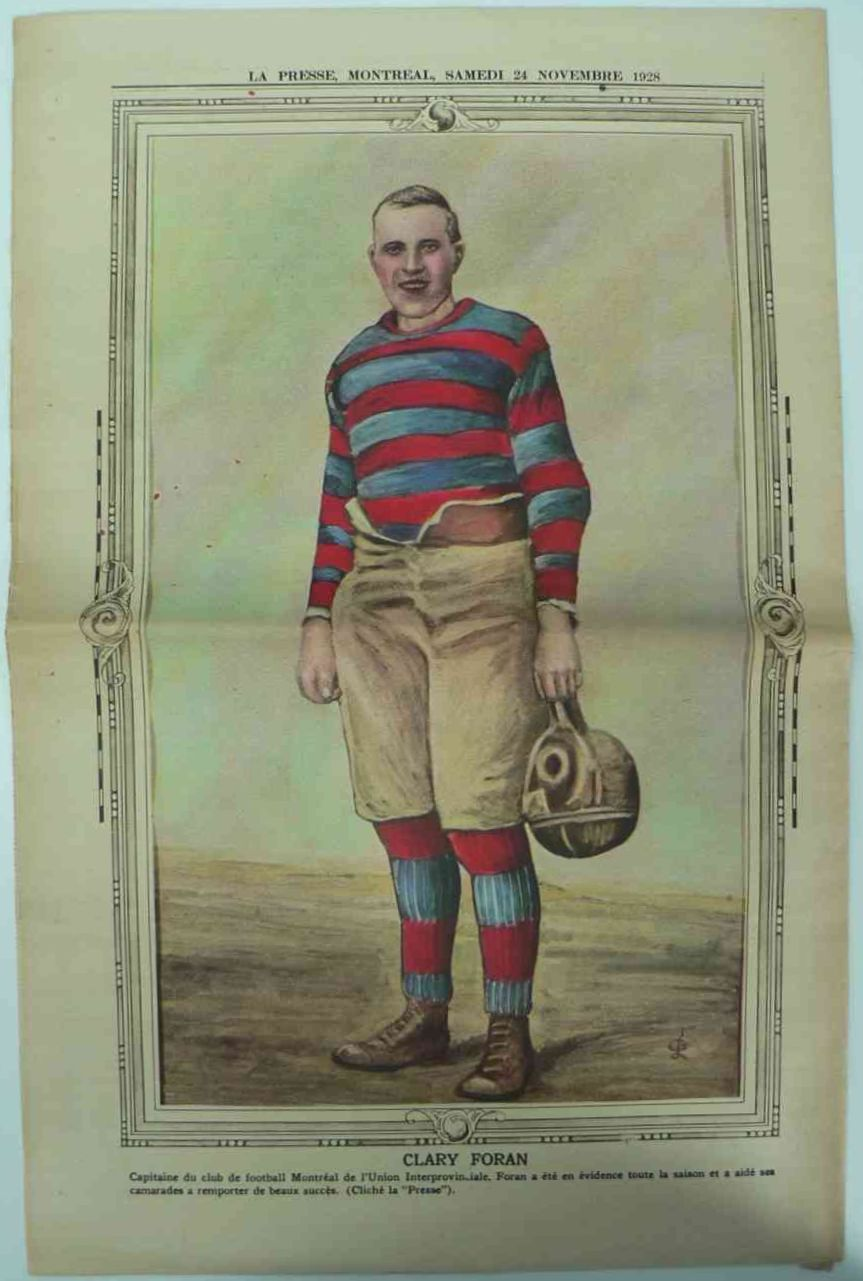
An illustration of a player for the Montreal AAA Winged Wheelers in 1928

The Montreal AAA Winged Wheelers were a Canadian football team and a member of the Interprovincial Rugby Football Union, a league that preceded the Canadian Football League. The team existed from 1872 to 1935. The Montreal AAA sponsored the Montreal Football Club, founded April 8, 1872. The Montreal Football Club joined the Quebec Rugby Football Union in 1883 and used the AAA grounds to play its games. The AAA Winged Wheelers started in the IRFU in 1911.

The team won the 1931 Grey Cup championship.

== Team facts ==
Founded: 1911

Home stadium: Montreal AAA Grounds

IRFU regular season championships: 3 — 1919, 1931, 1933

IRFU championships: 2 — 1919, 1931

Grey Cup championships: 1 — 1931

== Canadian Football Hall of Famers ==
- Cap Fear
- Billy Hughes
- Frank McGill
- Percival Molson
- Gordon Perry
- Jeff Russel
- Huck Welch

== Seasons ==
Season	W	L	T	PF	PA	Pts	Finish	Playoffs
1919	4	2	0	71	51	8	1st	IRFU Champion
1920	0	6	0	35	77	0	4th	Last Place
1921	0	6	0	29	190	0	4th	Last Place
1922	2	4	0	43	56	4	3rd	-
1923	2	3	1	45	73	5-	3rd	-
1924	1	5	0	28	65	2	4th	Last Place
1925	3	3	0	27	43	6	2nd	-
1926	1	5	0	48	83	2	4th	Last Place
1927	1	5	0	25	60	2	4th	Last Place
1928	3	3	0	62	34	6	2nd	-
1929	4	2	0	41	40	6	2nd	-
1930	2	3	1	35	44	6	3rd	-
1931	6	0	0	112	39	12	1st	Won 19th Grey Cup
1932	4	2	0	68	32	8	2nd	-
1933	4	2	0	67	55	8	1st - tie	Lost IRFU two game playoff
1934	3	2	1	54	42	7	2nd	-
1935	0	9	0	48	133	0	4th	Last Place
Totals	38	62	3			79	-	1 Grey Cup
