= Hugo Ross Trophy =

Canadian rugby union trophy

The Hugo Ross Trophy was named after a Winnipeg real estate broker, Hugo Ross, who donated the championship trophy to the Western Canada Rugby Football Union (WCRFU). Hugo Ross died a year earlier in April 1912, as he was one of many who drowned in the sinking of RMS Titanic.

When the WCRFU joined the Canadian Rugby Union in 1921, the Hugo Ross Trophy champion were able to play for the Grey Cup against teams outside Western Canada. In 1935, the Winnipeg 'Pegs became the only WCRFU team to win the Grey Cup.

By 1936, the Hugo Ross Trophy was awarded to the champion of the Western Interprovincial Football Union (WIFU). The winner of the trophy usually ended up playing against the IRFU champions for the Grey Cup. The Hugo Ross Trophy was awarded to the WIFU champion from 1936 to 1947.

In the 1948 season, the Hugo Ross Trophy was replaced by the N. J. Taylor Trophy as the official WIFU trophy. The N. J. Taylor Trophy was awarded to the CFL West Division champions until 2003.

== Hugo Ross Trophy winners ==
- 1947 – Winnipeg Blue Bombers
- 1946 – Winnipeg Blue Bombers
- 1945 – Winnipeg Blue Bombers (Note: There were no WIFU regular season games, but the original three teams of the WIFU played in the Grey Cup playoffs.)
- 1944 – not awarded due to World War II
- 1943 – not awarded due to World War II
- 1942 – not awarded due to World War II
- 1941 – Winnipeg Blue Bombers
- 1940 – Winnipeg Blue Bombers (Note: Winnipeg Blue Bombers were not allowed to compete in the Grey Cup, because the CRU did not approve of the WIFU season being played under rules that varied from IRFU rules.)
- 1939 – Winnipeg Blue Bombers
- 1938 – Winnipeg Blue Bombers
- 1937 – Winnipeg Blue Bombers
- 1936 – Regina Roughriders (Note: Regina Rugby Club did not play in the Grey Cup finals. The CRU rule was that who ever gave up the fewest points between the winners of the WIFU and the IRFU finals would be eligible to play against the ORFU Champion in the Grey Cup. It was determined that the Ottawa Rough Riders gave up fewer points in the IRFU Finals, so they qualified for the Grey Cup.)
- 1935 – Winnipeg 'Pegs
- 1934 – Regina Roughriders
- 1933 – Winnipeg 'Pegs
- 1932 – Regina Roughriders
- 1931 – Regina Roughriders
- 1930 – Regina Roughriders
- 1929 – Regina Roughriders
- 1928 – Regina Roughriders
- 1927 – Regina Roughriders
- 1926 – Regina Roughriders
- 1925 – Winnipeg Tammany Tigers
- 1924 – Winnipeg Tammany Tigers
- 1923 – Regina Rugby Club
- 1922 – Edmonton Eskimos
- 1921 – Edmonton Eskimos
- 1920 – Regina Rugby Club
- 1919 – Regina Rugby Club
- 1918 – not awarded due to World War I
- 1917 – not awarded due to World War I
- 1916 – not awarded due to World War I
- 1915 – Regina Rugby Club
- 1914 – Regina Rugby Club
- 1913 – Regina Rugby Club
- 1912 – Regina Rugby Club
- 1911 – Calgary Tigers

== See also ==
- See the N. J. Taylor Trophy to view champions from 1948–present.
