= List of Saskatchewan Roughriders head coaches =

The Saskatchewan Roughriders are a professional Canadian football team based in Regina, Saskatchewan, and are members of the West Division in the Canadian Football League (CFL). The club was founded in 1910 as the Regina Rugby Club and began as a member of the Saskatchewan Rugby Football Union. They were a founding member of the CFL when it was formed in 1958. The current Roughriders head coach is Corey Mace, the general manager is Jeremy O'Day, and the current president and chief executive officer for the community-owned team is Craig Reynolds.

== Key ==
General
#	Number of coaches^{[a]}
†	Elected to the Canadian Football Hall of Fame in the builders category
Achievements	Achievements during their Saskatchewan head coaching tenure

Regular season
GC	Games coached	T	Ties = 1 point
W	Wins = 2 points	PTS	Points
L	Losses = 0 points	Win%	Winning percentage^{[b]}

Playoffs and Grey Cup
PGC	Games coached
PW	Wins
PL	Losses
PWin%	Winning percentage

== Head coaches ==
Note: Statistics are current through the end of the 2026 CFL season.

#	Name	Term^{[b]}	GC	W	L	T	PTS	Win%	PGC	PW	PL	PWin%	Achievements
1	Fred Ritter	1911–1913	12	10	2	0	20	.833	5	4	1	.800	
2	Frank Townsend	1914	4	4	0	0	8	1.000	2	2	0	1.000	
3	Hick Abbott	1915–1916	6	6	0	0	12	1.000	1	1	0	1.000	
4	Jerry Crapper	1919–1921	13	13	0	0	26	1.000	5	4	1	.800	
5	Jack Eadie	1922–1923	8	7	1	0	14	.875	4	2	2	.500	
6	Ed Dolan	1924	6	4	2	0	8	.667	1	0	1	.000	
7	Doc Blackwood	1925	—	—	—	—	—	—	2	1	1	.500	
8	Howie Milne	1926–1928	9	9	0	0	18	1.000	7	6	1	.857	
9	Al Ritchie†	1929–1933	24	21	2	1	43	.896	17	12	5	.706	
10	Greg Grassick	1934	6	6	0	0	12	1.000	4	3	1	.750	
-	Al Ritchie†	1935	4	4	0	0	8	1.000	1	0	1	.000	
11	Dean Griffing	1936–1941	50	23	26	1	47	.470	3	2	1	.667	
12	Don King/Lindsay Holt	1945	—	—	—	—	—	—	2	0	2	.000	
13	Ken Preston†	1946–1947	16	5	11	0	10	.313	—	—	—	—	
14	Fred Grant	1948–1950	40	19	21	0	38	.475	5	1	3	.300	
15	Harry Smith	1951	14	8	6	0	16	.571	4	2	2	.500	
16	Glenn Dobbs	1952	16	3	13	0	6	.188	—	—	—	—	
17	Frank Filchock	1953–1957	80	41	35	4	86	.538	11	4	6	.409	
18	George Terlep	1958–1959	25	7	16	2	16	.320	2	0	2	.000	
19	Frank Tripucka	1959	7	1	6	0	2	.143	—	—	—	—	
20	Ken Carpenter	1960	16	2	12	2	6	.188	—	—	—	—	
21	Steve Owen	1961–1962	32	13	17	2	28	.438	2	0	2	.000	1962 Annis Stukus Trophy winner
22	Bob Shaw	1963–1964	32	16	14	2	34	.531	7	3	4	.429	
23	Eagle Keys†	1965–1970	96	68	25	3	139	.724	17	9	8	.529	1968 Annis Stukus Trophy winner 54th Grey Cup championship
24	Dave Skrien	1971–1972	32	17	14	1	35	.547	6	3	3	.500	
25	John Payne	1973–1976	64	40	23	1	81	.633	8	4	4	.500	
26	Jim Eddy	1977–1978	27	10	17	0	20	.370	—	—	—	—	
27	Walt Posadowski	1978	11	4	6	1	9	.409	—	—	—	—	
28	Ron Lancaster	1979–1980	32	4	28	0	8	.125	—	—	—	—	
29	Joe Faragalli	1981–1983	38	16	21	1	35	.434	—	—	—	—	1981 Annis Stukus Trophy winner
30	Reuben Berry	1983–1984	26	10	15	1	21	.403	—	—	—	—	
31	Jack Gotta	1985–1986	34	11	22	1	23	.338	—	—	—	—	
32	John Gregory	1987–1991	79	35	43	1	71	.449	5	3	2	.600	1989 Annis Stukus Trophy winner 77th Grey Cup championship
33	Don Matthews†	1991–1993	47	25	22	0	50	.532	2	0	2	.000	
34	Ray Jauch	1994–1995	36	17	19	0	34	.472	1	0	1	.000	
35	Jim Daley	1996–1998	54	18	36	0	36	.333	3	2	1	.667	
36	Cal Murphy†	1999	18	3	15	0	6	.167	—	—	—	—	
37	Danny Barrett	2000–2006	126	57	68	1	115	.456	8	3	5	.375	
38	Kent Austin	2007	18	12	6	0	24	.667	3	3	0	1.000	2007 Annis Stukus Trophy winner 95th Grey Cup championship
39	Ken Miller	2008–2010	54	32	21	1	0	.602	6	3	3	.500	
40	Greg Marshall	2011	8	1	7	0	2	.125	—	—	—	—	
-	Ken Miller	2011	10	4	6	0	8	.400	—	—	—	—	
41	Corey Chamblin	2012–2015	63	29	34	0	58	.460	5	3	2	.600	2013 Annis Stukus Trophy winner 101st Grey Cup championship
42	Bob Dyce	2015	9	3	6	0	6	.333	—	—	—	—	
43	Chris Jones	2016–2018	54	27	27	0	54	.500	3	1	2	.333	
44	Craig Dickenson	2019–2023	68	34	34	0	68	.500	3	1	2	.333	
45	Corey Mace	2024–present	54	31	22	1	63	.583	5	3	2	.600	2025 Annis Stukus Trophy winner 112th Grey Cup championship

== Notes ==
- ^{a} A running total of the number of coaches of the Roughriders. Thus, any coach who has two or more separate terms as head coach is only counted once.
- ^{b} Each year is linked to an article about that particular CFL season.
