= Calgary Rugby Foot-ball Club =

Canadian football team (1906–1934)

General information
- Founded: 1906
- Folded: 1934
- Headquartered: Calgary, Alberta

Nicknames
- Tigers; 50th Battalion; Altomah-Tigers; Altomahs; Altomah-Indians

League / conference affiliations
- Calgary Rugby Football Union; Alberta Rugby Football Union; Western Canada Rugby Football Union

Championships
- League championships: 0; 11 league championships 1 WCRFU championship

Calgary Rugby Foot-ball Club was one of the first football teams based in Calgary, Alberta, formed March 14, 1906, at Calgary City Hall. It was part of the Calgary Rugby Football Union. Calgary City Rugby Foot-ball Club played its first game on October 31, 1907, defeating the Strathcona Rugby Foot-ball Club 15–0 at Calgary.

The Calgary Stampeders of the Canadian Football League, founded in 1945, do not trace their lineage to this club.

Calgary RFC was renamed the Calgary Tigers in 1908 and joined the Alberta Rugby Football League in the same year. It later joined the then newly formed Western Canada Rugby Football Union in 1911 and won the first-ever Western championship that year. The team would change names, fold and be reborn several names in next few decades:

- Calgary Tigers - 1908–1914, 1919–1920, 1925, 1928–1930
- 50th Battalion - 1923–1924
- Calgary Altomah-Tigers - 1931
- Calgary Altomah-Indians - 1932–1934

These teams were succeeded by a separate club:

- Calgary Bronks - 1935–1940

== Seasons ==
Season	Name	G	W	L	T	PF	PA	Finish	Playoffs
1907	Rugby Football Club	?	-	-	-	-	-	1st	CRFU Champion, lost Alberta Rugby Football League to Edmonton Rugby Foot-ball Club, 2 games to none, 26-5 & 10-5
1908	Tigers	4	3	1	0	87	37	1st	CRFU Champion, lost Alberta Rugby Football League to Edmonton Esquimaux, 2 games to none, 7-1 & 11–2)
1909	Tigers	3	3	0	0	55	5	1st	won Alberta Rugby Football League (beat Edmonton Esquimaux, 2 games to none, 25-1 & 23–6)
1910	Tigers	3	2	0	1	29	21	1st	won Alberta Rugby Football League (beat Edmonton Eskimos, 2 games to none, 25-7 & 14–12)
1911	Tigers	6	5	1	0	109	13	1st	won AFRU championship, beating Edmonton Eskimos, 14–0; won WCRFU championship with 13–6 win over Winnipeg Rowing Club
1912	Tigers	4	3	1	0	73	19	1st	won AFRU championship, lost western semi final to Winnipeg Rowing Club, 4-3
1913	Tigers	4	3	1	0	46	24	1st - tie	lost to Edmonton Eskimos in tiebreaker, 10–7, for ARFU championship
1914	Tigers	?						?	lost ARFU championship to University of Alberta Varsity, 2 games to none, 3-0 & 17-15
1915									did not play (see Calgary Canucks)
1916 to 1918									suspended due to war
1919	Tigers	3	1	2	0	11	28	3rd	
1920	Tigers	3	3	0	0	50	10	1st	won AFRU championship beating Edmonton Eskimos in 2-game series, total points 35–33; lost western semi final to Regina Rugby Club, 28-1
1921 to 1922									did not play
1923	50th Battalion	?						?	lost 13–7 to Edmonton Eskimos in ARFU final
1924	50th Battalion	2	1	1	0	11	9	1st	beat Edmonton Eskimos in ARFU playoff, 2 games total points 16–15; beat University of Alberta Varsity in ARFU championship finals, 2 games total points 21–1; lost to Winnipeg Victorias 11–9 in western final
1925	Tigers	2	0	2	0	15	37	2nd	
1926									did not play
1927									no league play
1928	Tigers	4	1	3	0	32	45	3rd	
1929	Tigers	5	5	0	0	117	28	1st	ARFU champions, lost western final to Regina Roughriders, 15-8
1930	Tigers	5	4	1	0	69	32	1st	ARFU champions, lost western semi final to Regina Roughriders, 9-6
1931	Altomah-Tigers	4	3	1	0	24	20	1st	ARFU champions, beat Vancouver Athletic Club in semi finals, 2 games 20-5 points, lost western final to Regina Roughriders, 26-2
1932	Altomah-Indians	4	4	0	0	42	4	1st	ARFU champions, beat Vancouver Meralomas in semi finals, 2 games 11-10 points, lost western final to Regina Roughriders, 30-2
1933	Altomah-Indians	4	3	1	0	38	14	1st	ARFU champions, beat Vancouver Meralomas in semi final, 13–11; lost western final to Winnipegs, 15-1
1934	Altomah-Indians	3	1	2	0	31	28	2nd	
1935	succeeded by Bronks								List of Calgary Bronks (football) seasons
Totals								-	11 Alberta Rugby Football Union or League championships & 1 WCRFU championship

== Other Calgary football clubs ==
Season	Name	G	W	L	T	PF	PA	Finish	Playoffs
1908	YMCA	4	3	1	0	93	40	2nd	
1908	Hillhurst Hornets	4	0	4	0	30	123	3rd	
1909	YMCA	3	1	2	0	18	49	2nd	
1909	Hillhurst Hornets	2	0	2	0	5	24	3rd	
1910	YMCA	3	0	2	1	21	29	2nd	
1911	Rough Riders	6	0	6	0	18	85	4th	
1912	YMCA	4	0	4	0	3	92	3rd	
1915	Canucks	?						?	beat University of Alberta Varsity 18-12 for ARFU championship, lost 17–1 to Regina Rugby Club in western final
1919	Canucks	4	4	0	0	57	20	1st	ARFU championship, lost 13–1 to Regina Rugby Club in western final
1920	Canucks	3	0	3	0	10	50	2nd	
1921	Calgary Rugby Club	3	1	2	0	39	104	3rd	
