= Edmonton Rugby Foot-ball Club =

Canadian football team

General information
- Founded: 1907
- Folded: 1929
- Headquartered: Edmonton, Alberta

Nicknames
- Esquimaux; Eskimos; Elks

League / conference affiliations
- Alberta Rugby Football League; Alberta Rugby Football Union; Western Canada Rugby Football Union

Championships
- League championships: 0: 7 league championships; 2 WCRFU championships

Edmonton Rugby Foot-ball Club was an early Canadian football team based in Edmonton, Alberta. The team was founded in 1907 as the Edmonton Rugby Foot-ball Club. The club was renamed the Edmonton Esquimaux in 1908 and again as the Edmonton Eskimos in 1910. Later it took the name Edmonton Boosters, then the Edmonton Hi-Grads in 1936, then yet another incarnation of the Eskimos before ceasing operation as the Second World War began. The team is neither affiliated with the current franchise, the Edmonton Elks (also previously named Eskimos), nor forms part of its history.

Football had been played in the city and environs for nearly two decades before the Edmonton Rugby Foot-ball Club was founded in 1907. The first game in Alberta was played in Edmonton, with Edmonton and Clover Bar (an outlying community, now a suburb) playing to a scoreless tie in 1890. "The first record of an organized rugby club in Edmonton appeared in the Edmonton bulletin on September 19, 1891." In 1891 Edmonton defeated Calgary 6–5 in the Alberta Total-point Challenge Series. A team from Edmonton (actually the outlying community of Fort Saskatchewan) had a picture taken of themselves after they defeated a Calgary team (in Calgary,) declaring themselves Champions of Alberta; the picture has two dates on it, being taken in either 1893 or 1895.

"The Edmonton Rugby Foot-ball Club was formed on April 10, 1907, and adopted the uniform colors of black with yellow facings. Edmonton played its first game on November 9 and defeated the Calgary City Rugby Foot-ball Club 26–5 at the Edmonton Exhibition Grounds." The club was renamed the Edmonton Esquimaux in 1908 and again as the Edmonton Eskimos in 1910. They competed in the Alberta Rugby Football League and later Alberta Rugby Football Union (ARFU) when it was created in 1911. In the years before and after the First World War the city was represented by the Edmonton Civics in 1914 and the Edmonton Canucks in 1919.

The Edmonton Eskimos were ARFU and WCRFU champions in 1921, earning the right to compete for the Grey Cup in the 9th Grey Cup championship game – the first time for a Western Canadian team – losing 23–0 to the undefeated Toronto Argonauts. The team was renamed the Edmonton Elks in 1922 and represented the WCRFU in the 10th Grey Cup, losing 13–1 to the Queen's University Golden Gaels.

The team changed names back to the Eskimos for the 1923 season, winning their third consecutive ARFU championship but failing to clinch the WCRFU championship. The Eskimos did not win the 1924 ARFU championship, and folded before the 1925 season.

The Eskimos team returned for the 1928 season, winning the ARFU or ARFL championship for the seventh time in 14 seasons of competition. Their last season was 1929, when the team was succeeded by a new club called the Edmonton Boosters. The Boosters folded after 3 seasons, and were later followed by the Edmonton Hi-Grads in 1936 (a team of high school graduate all-stars) and then yet another incarnation of the Eskimos, a team lasting two seasons (1938 and 1939) before ceasing operation as the Second World War began.

== Seasons ==
Season	Name	G	W	L	T	PF	PA	Finish	Playoffs
1907	Rugby Football Club	?	–	–	–	–	–	1st	Alberta Rugby Football League champion (beat Calgary Rugby Foot-ball Club, CRFU winners, 2 games to none, 26–5 & 10–5)
1908	Esquimaux	?	–	–	–	–	–	1st	Alberta Rugby Football League champion (beat Calgary Tigers, CRFU winners, 2 games to none, 7–1 & 11–2)
1909	Esquimaux	?	–	–	–	–	–	?	Lost Alberta Rugby Football League (beat by Calgary Tigers, 2 games to none, 25–1 & 23–6)
1910	Eskimos	?	–	–	–	–	–	?	Lost Alberta Rugby Football League (beat by Calgary Tigers, 2 games to none, 25–7 & 14–12)
1911	Eskimos	6	4	1	1	73	41	2nd	Lost ARFU championship to Calgary Tigers, 14–0
1912	Eskimos	4	3	1	0	55	20	2nd	
1913	Eskimos	4	3	1	0	74	28	1st – tie	Beat Calgary Tigers in tiebreaker, 10–7, for ARFU championship, lost to Regina Rugby Club in western semi final, 19–7
1914	Did not play (see Edmonton Civics)								
1915	Did not play								
1916 to 1918	Suspended due to war								
1919	Did not play (see Edmonton Canucks)								
1920	Eskimos	2	2	0	0	54	4	1st	Lost ARFU championship to Calgary Tigers in 2 game series, total points, 35–33
1921	Eskimos	3	3	0	0	148	5	1st	ARFU champion, beat Winnipeg Victorias, 16–6 (WCRFU championship) to advance to 9th Grey Cup, lost to Toronto Argonauts, 23–0
1922	Elks	2	2	0	0	54	1	1st	ARFU champion, beat Regina Rugby Club, 13–8 & Winnipeg Victorias, 19–6 (WCRFU championship) to advance to 10th Grey Cup, lost to Queen's University, 13–1
1923	Eskimos	2	2	0	0	30	9	1st	Beat Calgary 50th Battalion for ARFU championship, lost to Regina Rugby Club in western semi-final, 9–6
1924	Eskimos	2	1	1	0	9	11	2nd	Lost playoff to Calgary 50th Battalion, 2 games total points, 16–15 (14–1 & 1–15)
1925 to 1927	Did not play								
1928	Eskimos	4	3	1	0	31	26	1st	ARFU champion – did not participate in western playoffs
1929	Eskimos	6	1	5	0	36	127	3rd	Lost city championship to University of Alberta, 19–3
Totals		35	24	10	1	564	272		2 Grey Cup game losses; 7 Alberta Rugby Football Union or League championships

== Other Edmonton football clubs ==
Season	Name	G	W	L	T	PF	PA	Finish	Playoffs
1911	YMCA	6	2	4	0	24	85	3rd	
1914	Civics	3	1	2	0	20	21	2nd	
1919	Canucks	2	0	2	0	8	17	4th	
1922	Harlequins	2	0	2	0	1	56	2nd	
1930	Boosters	5	1	4	0	42	61	3rd	
1931	Boosters	4	1	3	0	20	24	2nd	
1932	Boosters	4	1	3	0	17	7	2nd	
1936	Hi-Grads	5	1	4	0	23	39	3rd	
1938	Eskimos	8	0	8	0	29	117	4th	
1939	Eskimos	11	3	8	0	80	147	4th	
