= Burnside rules =

1903 Canadian football ruleset

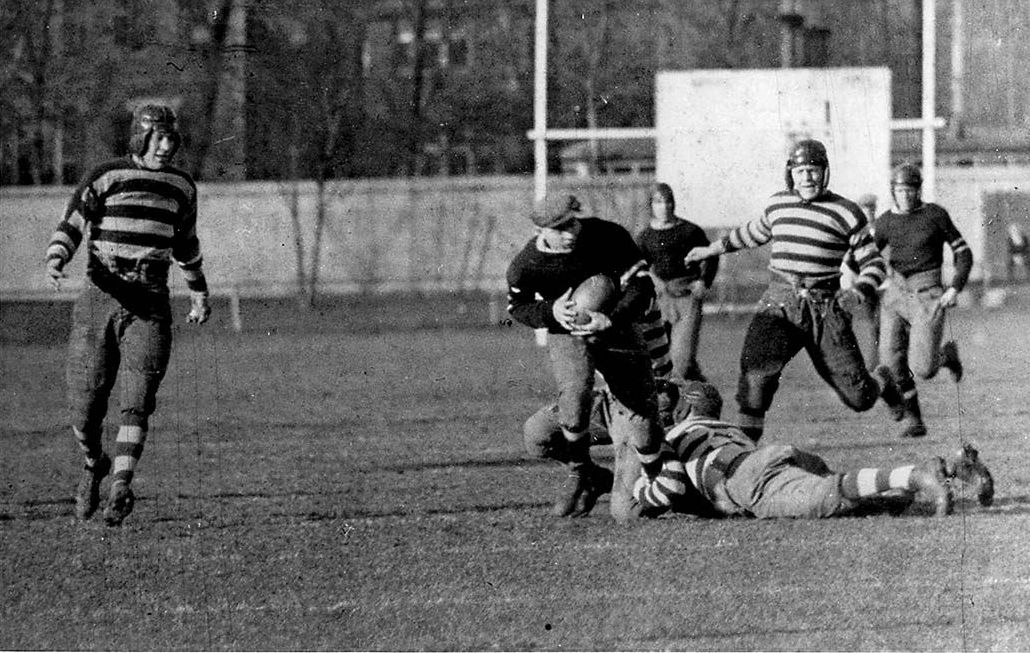
Game between Ottawa Rough Riders and Toronto Argonauts, 1924

The Burnside rules were a set of rules that transformed Canadian football from a rugby-style game to the gridiron-style game it has remained ever since. The rules were first adopted by the Ontario Rugby Football Union in 1903, and were named after John Thrift Meldrum Burnside, captain of the University of Toronto football team (although he did not originate them). The Burnside rules introduced sweeping changes to the way football was played.

The rules included:

- a reduction from 15 to 12 players per side
- a reduction from 8 to 6 men allowed on the line of scrimmage when the ball was put into play
- the "snap-back" system in which the ball was passed backward from a static line of scrimmage by the centre
- a requirement for a team to make ten yards in three successive downs or lose possession of the ball

Although similar, Burnside rules had many differences and evolved separately from the American football rules already in place at the time. The American code had been developed by Walter Camp in the 1880s (later on, it made some modifications to its rules). Although these rules are standard today, at the time they were considered radical. Other teams outside the Ontario Rugby Football Union refused to adopt them until 1921. For the 1906 season they did adopt the Inter-Collegiate rules of 10 yards to gain in 3 downs.

The Alberta Union's playing rules were drawn up by the Reverend Robert 'Bob' Pearson, during World War I; the Alberta Union rules were heavily influenced by the Burnside rules, which Pearson had known as a player. In late 1920, these rules were agreed to by the other Western Canadian football unions. The Canadian Rugby Union Rules Committee had been seeking to standardize its rules under its former president W. A. Hewitt, and proposed a very similar version of the new Alberta Union rules in April 1921. The CRU's proposed regulations were approved to be used in 1921 in Canadian football.
