= St. John's Rugby Football Club =

Canadian football team

St.John's Rugby Football Club

General information
- Founded: 1892
- Folded: 1932
- Headquartered: Winnipeg, Manitoba

League / conference affiliations
- Manitoba Rugby Football Union; Western Canada Rugby Football Union

Championships
- League championships: 0; 13 league championships

The St. John's Rugby Football Club was a Canadian football team in Winnipeg, Manitoba, formed in October 1887, that played in the Manitoba Rugby Football Union and Western Canada Rugby Football Union between 1892 and 1932. The team was founded by students of St. John's College, but as information about this team has been mostly lost to history, it seems that the football team was not officially associated with the college (as mention of the team is not found in any of the school's official history). There was a St. John's Royalists junior football team, but no information links it to the MRFU club.

The St. John's Rugby Football Club was a successful team, having won 13 MRFU championships in the 31 seasons they played.

While the St. John's Rugby Football Club did merge with new Winnipeg Rugby Football Club in 1932, the team is not part of the official history or records of Winnipeg's current team: the Blue Bombers.

== MRFU season-by-season ==
Season	G	W	L	T	PF	PA	Pts	Finish	Playoffs
1892	4	3	1	0	40	28	6	1st	MRFU Champion
1893	4	3	0	1	48	3	7	1st	MRFU Champion
1894	4	1	3	0	31	42	0	2nd	
1895	4	3	1	0	39	16	6	1st	MRFU Champion
1896	3	2	1	0	34	23	4	1st	MRFU Champion
1897	5	3	2	0	38	69	6	1st	3-way tie - no champion
1898	5	5	0	0	55	24	10	1st	MRFU Champion
1899	6	5	1	0	83	29	10	1st	MRFU Champion
1900	6	2	3	1	23	39	5	2nd	
1901	6	2	4	0	35	49	4	2nd	
1902	4	0	4	0	37	68	0	3rd	
1903	4	1	3	0	29	78	2	3rd	
1904	4	3	1	0	43	20	6	1st - tied	lost MRFU playoff to Winnipeg Rowing Club, 20-8
1905	2	0	2	0	3	50	0	4th	
1906	4	1	3	0	8	52	6	3rd	
1907	4	1	3	0	21	55	2	2nd	
1908	5	3	1	1	64	43	7	1st	MRFU Champion
1909	4	3	1	0	38	35	6	1st	MRFU Champion
1910	4	1	3	0	28	61	2	2nd	
1911	4	1	3	0	24	61	2	2nd	
1912	5	1	3	1	28	54	3	2nd	
1913	4	2	2	0	32	51	4	1st - tied	Won MRFU playoff game Vs Winnipeg Tammany Tigers 23–8, lost MRFU final to Winnipeg Rowing Club, 13-2
1914									Did Not Play
1915									no league play
1916 to 1918									League suspended due to the Great War
1919	3	0	3	0	1	36	0	3rd	
1920 to 1924									Did Not Play
1925	6	1	5	0	17	57	2	4th	
1926	6	4	2	0	63	27	8	1st - tied	Won MRFU Championship 14–5 over Winnipeg Victorias, lost west semi final to Regina, 13-5
1927	4	0	4	0	10	55	0	3rd	
1928	5	3	1	1	43	28	7	2nd	Tri-City Rugby Football League - Lost west final to Regina, 12-1
1929	4	2	2	0	42	35	4	1st - tied	Won MRFU Championship playoff over Winnipeg Tammany Tigers, 10–1, lost west semi final to Regina, 19-3
1930	4	4	0	0	75	5	8	1st	MRFU Champion, lost west playoff to Regina, 23-0
1931	3	3	0	0	29	5	6	1st	MRFU Champion, lost west semi final to Regina, 47-5
1932	6	5	0	1	101	13	11	1st	MRFU Champion, lost west semi final to Regina, 9-1
Totals	136	68	62	6	1,162	1,211	–	–	
