= Manitoba Rugby Football Union =

Defunct Canadian football league

Manitoba Rugby Football Union was a Canadian football league, founded on Monday February 22, 1892. The league merged with the Alberta Rugby Football Union and Saskatchewan Rugby Football Union to form the Western Canada Rugby Football Union on Saturday October 21, 1911.

== MRFU teams ==
| Team | Years |
|---|---|
| Winnipegs | 1930–1935 |
| Winnipeg Rugby Football Club | 1892–1906 |
| St. John's Rugby Football Club | 1892–1913, 1919, 1925–1931 |
| Winnipeg Rowing Club | 1902–1914 |
| Winnipeg Tammany Tigers | 1913–1929 |
| Winnipeg Victorias Rugby Club | 1919–1927, 1935 |
| Winnipeg Shamrocks | 1903, 1905 |
| Brandon Football Club | 1906 |
| Wesley College Football Club | 1897–1898 |
| Royal Canadian Dragoons | 1897–1898 |
| Royal School Infantry/90th Regiment | 1888 |
| Garrison Rugby Club | 1932–1933 |
| University of Manitoba Bisons and Varsity | 1920–1926, 1934 |
| Osborne Rugby Football Club | 1892–1893 |
| Winnipeg Canoe Club | 1915 |

== MRFU Champions ==
| Year | Team |
|---|---|
| 1892 | St. John's Rugby Football Club |
| 1893 | St. John's Rugby Football Club |
| 1894 | Winnipeg Rugby Football Club |
| 1895 | St. John's Rugby Football Club |
| 1896 | St. John's Rugby Football Club |
| 1897 | No Champion (Note: (Wesley College Football club, St. John's Rugby Football Club and Winnipeg Rugby Football Club finished in a three way tie)) |
| 1898 | St. John's Rugby Football Club |
| 1899 | St. John's Rugby Football Club |
| 1900 | Winnipeg Rugby Football Club |
| 1901 | Winnipeg Rugby Football Club |
| 1902 | Winnipeg Rowing Club |
| 1903 | Winnipeg Shamrocks |
| 1904 | Winnipeg Rowing Club |
| 1905 | Winnipeg Rowing Club |
| 1906 | Winnipeg Rowing Club |
| 1907 | Winnipeg Rowing Club |
| 1908 | St. John's Rugby Football Club |
| 1909 | St. John's Rugby Football Club |
| 1910 | Winnipeg Rowing Club |
| 1911 | Winnipeg Rowing Club |
| 1912 | Winnipeg Rowing Club |
| 1913 | Winnipeg Rowing Club |
| 1914 | Winnipeg Rowing Club |
| 1915 | No League Play (Note: Winnipeg Tigers won the only game played in 1915) |
| 1916 | World War I |
| 1917 | World War I |
| 1918 | World War I |
| 1919 | Winnipeg Victorias Rugby Club |
| 1920 | Winnipeg Victorias Rugby Club |
| 1921 | Winnipeg Victorias Rugby Club |
| 1922 | Winnipeg Victorias Rugby Club |
| 1923 | Winnipeg Victorias Rugby Club |
| 1924 | Winnipeg Victorias Rugby Club |
| 1925 | Winnipeg Tammany Tigers |
| 1926 | Winnipeg St. John's |
| 1927 | Winnipeg Tammany Tigers |
| 1928 | St Johns Royalists and Winnipeg Tammany Tigers played in the Western Inter-Provincial Rugby Football League |
| 1929 | |

- 1892 - St. John's Rugby Football Club
- 1893 - St. John's Rugby Football Club
- 1894 - Winnipeg Rugby Football Club
- 1895 - St. John's Rugby Football Club
- 1896 - St. John's Rugby Football Club
- 1897 - No Champion (Wesley College Football Club, St.John's Rugby Football Club and Winnipeg Rugby Football Club finished in a three-way tie)
- 1898 - St. John's Rugby Football Club
- 1899 - St. John's Rugby Football Club
- 1900 - Winnipeg Rugby Football Club
- 1901 - Winnipeg Rugby Football Club
- 1902 - Winnipeg Rowing Club
- 1903 - Winnipeg Shamrocks
- 1904 - Winnipeg Rowing Club
- 1905 - Winnipeg Rowing Club
- 1906 - Winnipeg Rowing Club
- 1907 - Winnipeg Rowing Club
- 1908 - St. John's Rugby Football Club
- 1909 - St. John's Rugby Football Club
- 1910 - Winnipeg Rowing Club
- 1911 - Winnipeg Rowing Club
- 1912 - Winnipeg Rowing Club
- 1913 - Winnipeg Rowing Club
- 1914 - Winnipeg Rowing Club
- 1915 - No League Play - Winnipeg Tigers won the only game played in 1915
- 1916 - World War I
- 1917 - World War I
- 1918 - World War I
- 1919 - Winnipeg Victorias
- 1920 - Winnipeg Victorias
- 1921 - Winnipeg Victorias
- 1922 - Winnipeg Victorias
- 1923 - Winnipeg Victorias
- 1924 - Winnipeg Victorias
- 1925 - Winnipeg Tammany Tigers
- 1926 - Winnipeg St. John's
- 1927 - Winnipeg Tammany Tigers
- 1928 - St Johns Royalists and Winnipeg Tammany Tigers played in the Western Inter-Provincial Rugby Football League
- 1929 - Winnipeg St.John's
- 1930 - Winnipeg St.John's
- 1931 - Winnipeg St.John's
- 1932 - Winnipeg St.John's
- 1933 - Winnipegs
- 1934 - Winnipegs
- 1935 - Winnipegs

=== TOTALS ===
- 13 - St.John's Rugby Football Club
- 10 - Winnipeg Rowing Club
- 6 - Winnipeg Victorias Rugby Club
- 3 - Winnipegs (Winnipeg Blue Bombers)
- 3 - Winnipeg Rugby Football Club
- 2 - Winnipeg Tammany Tigers
- 1 - Winnipeg Shamrocks
