= 1893 in Canadian football =

== Canadian football news in 1893 ==
=== Final regular season standings ===
Note: GP = Games played, W = Wins, L = Losses, T = Ties, PF = Points for, PA = Points against, Pts = Points

Quebec Rugby Football Union
| Team | GP | W | L | T | PF | PA | Pts |
|---|---|---|---|---|---|---|---|
| Montreal Football Club | 2 | 2 | 0 | 0 | 35 | 12 | 4 |
| Britannia Football Club | 2 | 1 | 1 | 0 | 32 | 14 | 2 |
| Quebec City Football Club | 1 | 0 | 1 | 0 | 4 | 23 | 0 |
| McGill University | 1 | 0 | 1 | 0 | 3 | 25 | 0 |

Manitoba Rugby Football Union
| Team | GP | W | L | T | PF | PA | Pts |
|---|---|---|---|---|---|---|---|
| St.John's Rugby Football Club | 4 | 3 | 0 | 1 | 48 | 3 | 7 |
| Winnipeg Rugby Football Club | 4 | 2 | 2 | 0 | 20 | 39 | 4 |
| Osborne Rugby Football Club | 4 | 0 | 3 | 1 | 10 | 36 | 1 |

- Bold text means that they had clinched the playoffs.

== League Champions ==
| Football union | League Champion |
|---|---|
| ORFU | Queen's University |
| QRFU | Montreal Football Club |
| MRFU | St.John's Rugby Football Club |
| Northwest Championship | Winnipeg combined team |

== Playoffs ==
=== QRFU Final ===
**QRFU Final**
| **Montreal Football Club 25** | McGill University 3 |
**Montreal Football Club advance to the 1893 Dominion Championship**.

=== ORFU Semi-Finals ===
**ORFU Semi-Final 1**
| **Osgoode Hall 34** | Toronto Argonauts 28 |
| **Toronto Argonauts 21** | Osgoode Hall 13 |
**Toronto Argonauts advance to the 1893 ORFU Championship**.

**ORFU Semi-Final 2**
| **Queen's University 27** | Hamilton Tigers 13 |
**Queen's University win by forfeit and advance to the 1893 ORFU Championship**.

=== ORFU Final ===
**ORFU Final** Game 1
| **Queen's University 28** | Toronto Argonauts 3 |
| Queen's University 27 | Toronto Argonauts 1 |
**Queen's University advance to the 1893 Dominion Championship**.

== Dominion Championship ==
November 23 1893 Dominion Championship Game: Montreal AAA Grounds - Montreal, Quebec
| Queen's University 29 | Montreal Football Club 11 |
**Queen's University are the 1893 Dominion Champions**.
