= Toronto Parkdale =

Amateur Canadian football and hockey club based in Toronto, Ontario (1909–23)

Toronto Parkdale Canoe Club

General information
- Founded: 1909; 117 years ago
- Folded: 1923; 103 years ago
- Headquartered: Toronto, Ontario, Canada

League / conference affiliations
- Ontario Rugby Football Union

Championships
- League championships: 0; 1909, 1913, 1921, 1922

Toronto Parkdale was an amateur Canadian football and hockey club based in the Parkdale neighbourhood in the west end of Toronto. As a branch of the Parkdale Canoe Club established in August 1905, the club's hockey and football teams were nicknamed the Paddlers. They were also known colloquially as the West Enders, and as the Green and White, after the team colours.

The Paddlers' senior football team lost to the University of Toronto Varsity Blues in the first Grey Cup game in 1909. The senior hockey team had Billy Burch on their roster in the 1919–20 season.

== Early years (1905–1914) ==
The Paddlers joined the Ontario Rugby Football Union (ORFU) in 1905, entering a team in the junior series. With former Toronto Argonauts quarterback Lou Marsh as their coach, the Parkdale juniors won the Toronto district championship in 1907, and in 1908 they won the Ontario provincial and Canadian Dominion championships.

In 1909 the club decided to enter a team made up of its junior graduates in the ORFU senior series. In that inaugural season in the upper series, they finished in a first-place tie in the standings with the defending champion Toronto Amateur Athletic Club team, whom they defeated 9–3 in the resulting tie-break, securing the senior title in their first season of play. As league champions they qualified to compete for the Dominion championship along with the champions of the Intercollegiate Rugby Football Union and the Interprovincial Rugby Football Union. After the Intercollegiate champion University of Toronto Varsity Blues defeated the Interprovincial champion Ottawa Rough Riders in the Dominion semifinal, the Paddlers faced the heavily favoured Blues in the final. They lost 26–6 at Rosedale Field in Toronto, having trailed 6–5 at half-time. For the first time that season, the Dominion champions were presented with the Grey Cup, giving Parkdale a place in Canadian football history as one of the first two teams to challenge for the trophy.

After a winless 1910 season the Paddlers dropped out of the ORFU, making their return to the league in 1912. In the meantime, the Parkdale Canoe Club had iced an Ontario Hockey Association junior team. In 1913 the Paddlers finished in first place with a record of 3–1 and defeated the Toronto Rowing and Athletic Association team 8–5 in a playoff to capture their second ORFU championship. When the Intercollegiate champions, McGill University, declined to participate in the Dominion championship, Parkdale advanced to their second Grey Cup berth, losing to the favourite Hamilton Tigers in Hamilton by a score of 44–2.

== Later years (1914–1923) ==
With the outbreak of war in 1914, the Paddlers again dropped out of the ORFU and did not return to league competition until 1920. In 1921 they won their third ORFU championship and advanced to what, in previous seasons, would have been the Grey Cup final against the Toronto Argonauts. However, in 1921 a new layer of competition was introduced to the Dominion championship pitting the Eastern Canada champions against the Western Canada champions for the Grey Cup. Playing in the first-ever Eastern Final, Parkdale was beaten 16–8 by the undefeated Argonauts, who went on to win the first-ever East-versus-West Dominion title. In 1922 the Paddlers repeated as ORFU champions with a 6–0 record, only to fall again to the Argos in the Eastern Final by a score of 20–1.

After finishing in second place in 1923, Parkdale dropped out of the ORFU for the third and final time. The football club would fold, but the Parkdale Canoe Club continued to thrive as a social and athletic club. In 1935 the club changed its name to the Boulevard Club. It continues to operate under that name today.

== ORFU season-by-season ==
Season	G	W	L	T	PF	PA	Pts	Finish	Playoffs
1909	4	3	1	0	92	20	6	2nd	Beat Toronto A.A.C. (8–3) to win ORFU championship, lost 1st Grey Cup, 26–6, to Toronto Varsity Blues
1910	6	0	6	0	25	113	0	4th	
1911									did not play
1912	3	0	3	0	16	81	0	3rd	
1913	4	3	1	0	90	47	6	1st	Beat Toronto A.A.C. (8–5) to win ORFU championship, lost 5th Grey Cup, 44–2, to Hamilton Tigers
1914 to 1915									did not play
1916 to 1918									suspended due to World War I
1919									did not play
1920	4	1	3	0	35	60	2	2nd	
1921	4	4	0	0	104	25	8	1st	Won ORFU championship, lost eastern final to Toronto Argonauts, 16–8
1922	6	6	0	0	83	28	12	1st	Won ORFU championship, lost eastern semi final to Toronto Argonauts, 20–1
1923	4	2	2	0	26	4	4	2nd	
