= Winnipeg Tammany Tigers football team =

Canadian football team, 1913 to 1929

General information
- Founded: 1913
- Folded: 1929
- Headquartered: Winnipeg, Manitoba

Personnel
- General manager: Harold Roth
- Head coach: Leland 'Tote' Mitchell

Nickname
- Bengals

League / conference affiliations
- Manitoba Rugby Football Union; Western Canada Rugby Football Union

Championships
- League championships: 0; 2 (1925, 1927)

The Winnipeg Tammany Tigers football team was a Canadian football team in Winnipeg, Manitoba that played in the Manitoba Rugby Football Union and Western Canada Rugby Football Union between 1913 and 1929. On May 14, 1930, the Tammany Tigers disbanded due to financial difficulties and a month later was reorganized as a new team: the Winnipegs. The team was part of one of the most successful and popular sports clubs in the city, the Tammany Tigers Athletic Association, which also fielded championship lacrosse, baseball and ice hockey teams.

The Association first fielded a football team in 1910, and had junior and intermediate teams for 3 seasons. Led by popular coach and World War I veteran Leland 'Tote' Mitchell, the team managed to win two MRFU championships and played in the 13th Grey Cup game, losing to the Ottawa Senators 24–1.

While the Tammany Tigers did provide the nucleus of the new Winnipeg Rugby Football Club, (known simply as the Winnipegs) the team is not part of the official history or records of Winnipeg's current team: the Blue Bombers.

== MRFU season-by-season ==
Season	G	W	L	T	PF	PA	Pts	Finish	Playoffs
1913	4	2	2	0	36	23	4	2nd	lost MRFU semi-final to St.John's Rugby Football Club, 23–8
1914	5	2	3	0	36	43	4	2nd	
1915	1	1	0	0	10	4			No league play
1916 to 1918									League suspended due to the Great War
1919									did not play
1920	4	1	3	0	19	43	2	3rd	
1921	4	2	2	0	53	41	4	2nd	
1922	4	1	3	0	29	55	2	3rd	
1923	4	0	4	0	42	163	0	3rd	
1924	4	2	2	0	46	66	4	2nd	
1925	6	4	2	0	52	28	8	1st	Won MRFU Championship 11–0 Vs University of Manitoba Varsity, 11–0, Won WCRFU Championship 11–1 Vs Regina, Lost 13th Grey Cup 24–1 vs Ottawa Senators
1926	5	2	3	0	33	58	4	3rd	
1927	4	3	1	0	54	21	6	1st	Won MRFU Championship 11–1 Vs Winnipeg Victorias, 11–1, Lost West Semi-final 17–2 vs Regina
1928	5	1	4	0	27	64	2	3rd	Tri-City Rugby Football League
1929	4	2	2	0	35	42	4	2nd	Lost MRFU playoff 10–1 Vs Winnipeg St.John's College
Totals	54	23	31	0	472	651	44	–	
