= Winnipeg Rugby Football Club =

General information
- Founded: 1879; 147 years ago
- Folded: 1906; 120 years ago
- Headquartered: Winnipeg, Manitoba

League / conference affiliations
- Manitoba Rugby Football Union

Championships
- League championships: 0; 3 (1894, 1900, 1901)

The Winnipeg Rugby Football Club was a Canadian football team in Winnipeg, Manitoba that played in the Manitoba Rugby Football Union between 1892 and 1906. The team was originally founded in 1879, was the first club in Manitoba, and played in the Manitoba Rugby League, the forerunner to the MRFU which was founded in 1892. They were 3 time league champions.

The team is not part of the official history or records of Winnipeg's current team: the Blue Bombers.

== MRFU season-by-season ==
Season	G	W	L	T	PF	PA	Pts	Finish	Playoffs
1892	4	1	3	0	17	34	2	3rd	
1893	4	2	2	0	20	39	4	2nd	
1894	4	3	1	0	42	31	6	1st	MRFU Champion
1895	4	1	3	0	16	39	2	2nd	
1896	3	1	2	0	23	34	2	2nd	
1897	5	3	2	0	36	10	6	1st	3 way tie - no champion
1898	6	3	3	0	36	29	6	2nd	
1899	6	1	5	0	29	83	2	2nd	
1900	6	3	2	1	39	23	7	1st	MRFU Champion
1901	6	4	2	0	49	35	8	1st	MRFU Champion
1902	4	2	2	0	36	45	4	2nd	
1903									did not play
1904	4	0	4	0	23	67	0	3rd	
1905	3	2	1	0	28	23	4	2nd	
1906	6	1	5	0	26	22	5	4th	
Totals	65	27	37	1	420	514	54		Three MRFU Championships
