= 1892 in Canadian football =

== Canadian football news in 1892 ==
The first CRU Dominion Championship game was played between the Montreal Football Club and Osgoode Hall on November 10, 1892. The Manitoba Rugby Football Union was formed in 1892.

== Final regular season standings ==
Note: GP = Games Played, W = Wins, L = Losses, T = Ties, PF = Points For, PA = Points Against, Pts = Points

Quebec Rugby Football Union
Team	GP	W	L	T	PF	PA	Pts
**Montreal Football Club**	4	3	1	0	48	29	6
Britannia Football Club	4	2	2	0	23	38	4
McGill University	4	1	3	0	18	22	2

Manitoba Rugby Football Union
Team	GP	W	L	T	PF	PA	Pts
St.John's Rugby Football Club	4	3	1	0	40	28	6
Osborne Rugby Football Club	4	2	2	0	23	18	4
Winnipeg Rugby Football Club	4	1	3	0	17	34	2

*Bold text means that they have clinched the playoffs

== League Champions ==
Football Union	League Champion
ORFU	Osgoode Hall
QRFU	Montreal Football Club
MRFU	St.John's Rugby Football Club
Northwest Championship	Winnipeg Rugby Football Club

== Playoffs ==
=== ORFU Semi-Finals ===
**ORFU Semi-Final 1**
Hamilton Tigers 5	Toronto Argonauts 1
**Hamilton Tigers advance to the 1892 ORFU Championship**

**ORFU Semi-Final 2**
**Osgoode Hall 29**	Queen's University 8
**Osgoode Hall advance to the 1892 ORFU Championship**

=== ORFU Final ===
**ORFU Final**
**Osgoode Hall 30**	Hamilton Tigers 14
**Osgoode Hall advance to the 1892 Dominion Championship**

== Dominion Championship ==
November 10 1892 Dominion Championship Game: Rosedale Field - Toronto, Ontario
Osgoode Hall 45	Montreal Football Club 5
**Osgoode Hall are the 1892 Dominion Champions**
