= 1895 in Canadian football =

== Canadian Football News in 1895 ==
Alberta Rugby Football Union was formed in 1895.

=== Final regular season standings ===
Note: GP = Games Played, W = Wins, L = Losses, T = Ties, PF = Points For, PA = Points Against, Pts = Points

Quebec Rugby Football Union
Team	GP	W	L	T	PF	PA	Pts
Montreal Football Club	4	3	1	0	81	30	6
McGill University	4	3	1	0	33	25	6
Ottawa City Football Club	4	3	1	0	49	57	6
University of Ottawa	4	1	3	0	13	38	2
Britannia Football Club	4	0	4	0	24	100	0

Manitoba Rugby Football Union
Team	GP	W	L	T	PF	PA	Pts
St.John's Rugby Football Club	4	3	1	0	39	16	6
Winnipeg Rugby Football Club	4	1	3	0	16	39	2

*Bold text means that they have clinched the playoffs

== League Champions ==
Football Union	League Champion
ORFU	University of Toronto
QRFU	Montreal Football Club
MRFU	St.John's Rugby Football Club
Northwest Championship	Winnipeg Rugby Football Club

== Playoffs ==
=== QRFU Semi-Final ===
**QRFU Final** Game 1
**Montreal Football Club 13**	McGill University 2
**Montreal Football Club advance to the QRFU Final**

=== QRFU Final ===
**QRFU Final** Game 1
**Montreal Football Club 19**	Ottawa City Football Club 11
**Montreal Football Club advance to the 1895 Dominion Championship**

=== ORFU Semi-Final 1 ===
**ORFU Dominion Semi-Final** Game 1
**Queen's University 22**	Osgoode Hall 1
**Queen's University advance to the 1895 ORFU Championship**

=== ORFU Semi-Final 2 ===
**ORFU Semi-Final**
**University of Toronto 16**	Hamilton Tigers 13
**University of Toronto 14**	Hamilton Tigers 15
**University of Toronto advance to the 1895 ORFU Championship**

=== ORFU Final ===
**ORFU Final** Game 1
**University of Toronto 43**	Queen's University 2
**University of Toronto 7**	Queen's University 12
**University of Toronto advance to the 1895 Dominion Championship**

== Dominion Championship ==
November 21 1895 Dominion Championship Game: Montreal AAA Grounds - Montreal, Quebec
**University of Toronto 20**	Montreal Football Club 5
**University of Toronto are the 1895 Dominion Champions**
