= ARFU =

ARFU may refer to:

- Alberta Rugby Football Union
- Auckland Rugby Football Union
- Asian Rugby Football Union
