= Winnipeg Victorias Rugby Club =

Victoria Rugby Club

General information
- Founded: 1915
- Folded: 1935
- Headquartered: Winnipeg, Manitoba

Nickname
- Winnipeg Victorias

League / conference affiliations
- Manitoba Rugby Football Union; Western Canada Rugby Football Union

Championships
- League championships: 0; 6 league championships

The Victoria Rugby Club, popularly known as the Winnipeg Victorias, was a Canadian football team in Winnipeg, Manitoba that played in the Manitoba Rugby Football Union and Western Canada Rugby Football Union between 1915 and 1935. The Winnipeg Victorias formed in the summer of 1915 when they took over the Winnipeg Rowing Club football team. The Victorias were a new team, as the Rowing Club continued to operate, naturally, as a rowing club. Prior the 1915 season the Victorias announced that they would not have a senior team, but did have teams at the intermediate, junior and juvenile levels. In 1924 they were first Winnipeg team to qualify for the Grey Cup. "An internal disagreement over which railway to use ended up costing the team the right to play. The Victorias chose to suspend operations (in 1928) rather than join the new Western Inter-Provincial Rugby Football League. Concern over travel expenses was the reason."

The Winnipeg Victorias Rugby Club was a very successful team, having won six MRFU championships and one WCRFU Championship in the 10 seasons they played.

While the Winnipeg Victorias did disband in 1935 and several of their players (including Ches McCance) were acquired by the new Winnipeg Rugby Football Club in 1935, the team is not part of the official history or records of Winnipeg's current team: the Blue Bombers.

== Notable players ==
Ches McCance - 1935 (CFL Hall of Famer)

== MRFU season-by-season ==
Season	G	W	L	T	PF	PA	Pts	Finish	Playoffs
1919	4	4	0	0	65	5	8	1st	Won MRFU Championship, lost west playoff to Regina, 12-0
1920	4	4	0	0	66	20	8	1st	Won MRFU Championship, withdrew and defaulted western final to Regina
1921	4	4	0	0	59	37	8	1st	Won MRFU Championship, lost west final to Edmonton, 16-6
1922	4	4	0	0	59	24	8	1st	Won MRFU Championship, lost west final to Edmonton Elks, 19-6
1923	4	4	0	0	176	20	8	1st	Won MRFU Championship, lost west final to Regina, 11-1
1924	4	4	0	0	80	24	8	1st	Won MRFU Championship, won WCRFU Championship over Calgary 50th Battalion, 11-9, did not challenge for Grey Cup
1925	6	3	3	0	46	31	6	3rd	
1926	6	4	2	0	49	41	8	1st - tied	Lost MRFU playoff to Winnipeg St.John's, 14–5
1927	4	3	1	0	33	21	6	1st - tied	Lost MRFU playoff to Winnipeg Tammany Tigers, 10-1
1928 to 1934									did not play
1935	3	0	3	0	4	97	0	2nd	
