= 1898 in Canadian football =

== Regular season ==
=== Final regular season standings ===
Note: GP = Games Played, W = Wins, L = Losses, T = Ties, PF = Points For, PA = Points Against, Pts = Points

**Ontario Rugby Football Union**
Team	GP	W	L	T	PF	PA	Pts
**Ottawa Rough Riders**	6	6	0	0	170	20	12
Hamilton Tigers	6	4	2	0	63	62	8
Osgoode Hall	6	2	4	0	60	118	4
Toronto Argonauts	6	0	6	0	33	126	0

Quebec Rugby Football Union
Team	GP	W	L	T	PF	PA	Pts
Montreal Football Club	4	2	2	0	84	66	4
**Kingston Granites**	4	2	2	0	80	54	4
Ottawa College	4	2	2	0	22	66	4

**Intercollegiate Rugby Football Union**
Team	GP	W	L	T	Pts
**University of Toronto**	4	3	1	0	6
McGill University	4	2	2	0	4
Queen's University	4	1	3	0	2

- Bold text means that they have clinched the playoffs

Manitoba Rugby Football Union
Team	GP	W	L	T	PF	PA	Pts
St.John's Rugby Football Club	5	5	0	0	55	24	10
Winnipeg Rugby Football Club	6	3	3	0	36	29	6
Wesley College Football Club	6	2	4	0	60	49	4
Royal Canadian Dragoons	5	1	4	0	23	72	0

== League Champions ==
Football Union	League Champion
CIRFU	University of Toronto
ORFU	Ottawa Rough Riders
QRFU	Ottawa College
MRFU	St.John's Rugby Football Club

== Playoffs ==
=== Dominion Quarter Final ===
Away	Home
Ottawa College 23	Montreal Football Club 1

=== Dominion Semi-Final 1 ===
Away	Home
Ottawa College	Kingston Granites
Ottawa College wins by forfeit and advances to the Domininon Final

=== Dominion Semi-Final 2 ===
Away	Home
Ottawa Rough Riders 12	University of Toronto 3
Ottawa Rough Riders advance to the Dominion Final

== Dominion Championship ==
November 24 1898 Dominion Championship Game: Ottawa College Grounds - Ottawa, Ontario
Ottawa Rough Riders 11	Ottawa College 1
Ottawa Rough Riders are the 1898 Dominion Champions
