= 1897 in Canadian football =

== Canadian Football News in 1897 ==
The Canadian Intercollegiate Rugby Football Union was formed after the conclusion of the 1897 season.

In the Manitoba Rugby Football Union, the Royal Canadian Dragoons dropped out of competition in the spring of 1898. The three remaining teams finished the schedule in a three-way tie for first place. Tie-breaker games could not be scheduled as the college teams were involved in final exams.

=== Final regular season standings ===
Note: GP = Games Played, W = Wins, L = Losses, T = Ties, PF = Points For, PA = Points Against, Pts = Points

Quebec Rugby Football Union
Team	GP	W	L	T	PF	PA	Pts
**Ottawa College**	2	2	0	0	25	13	6
Montreal Football Club	1	0	1	0	13	14	0
McGill University	1	0	1	0	0	11	0

Manitoba Rugby Football Union
Team	GP	W	L	T	PF	PA	Pts
Wesley College Football Club	5	3	2	0	52	26	6
St.John's Rugby Football Club	5	3	2	0	38	69	6
Winnipeg Rugby Football Club	5	3	2	0	36	10	6
Royal Canadian Dragoons	3	0	3	0	15	36	0

(*) Dragoons withdrew from competition in spring of 1898

- Bold text means that they have clinched the playoffs

== League champions ==
Football Union	League Champion
ORFU	Hamilton Tigers
QRFU	Ottawa College
MRFU	No Champion
Northwest Championship	St.John's Rugby Football Club

== Playoffs ==
=== ORFU Final ===
ORFU Dominion Semi-Final
Hamilton Tigers 16	Osgoode Hall 8
Hamilton Tigers advance to the 1897 Dominion Championship

== Dominion Championship ==
November 25 1897 Dominion Championship Game: Montreal AAA Grounds - Montreal, Quebec
Ottawa College 14	Hamilton Tigers 10
University of Ottawa are the 1897 Dominion Champions
