= N. J. Taylor Trophy =

The N.J. Taylor Trophy is a Canadian Football League trophy, formerly awarded to the West Division champions. The winner of this trophy faced the winner of the James S. Dixon Trophy for the Grey Cup. Both the N. J. Taylor Trophy and James S. Dixon Trophy were retired in 2004.

The N.J. Taylor Trophy was named after former Western Inter-Provincial Football Union president N. J. "Piffles" Taylor. The trophy was first awarded in 1948, replacing the earlier Hugo Ross Trophy which served an identical function.

In 1995, as part of the failed American expansion, the Taylor Trophy was awarded to the champions of the Northern Division.

== N.J. Taylor Trophy winners ==
- Bold text represents the eventual Grey Cup champions.
- 2003 – **Edmonton Eskimos**
- 2002 – Edmonton Eskimos
- 2001 – **Calgary Stampeders**
- 2000 – **BC Lions**
- 1999 – Calgary Stampeders
- 1998 – **Calgary Stampeders**
- 1997 – Saskatchewan Roughriders
- 1996 – Edmonton Eskimos
- 1995 – Calgary Stampeders
- 1994 – **BC Lions**
- 1993 – **Edmonton Eskimos**
- 1992 – **Calgary Stampeders**
- 1991 – Calgary Stampeders
- 1990 – Edmonton Eskimos
- 1989 – **Saskatchewan Roughriders**
- 1988 – BC Lions
- 1987 – **Edmonton Eskimos**
- 1986 – Edmonton Eskimos
- 1985 – **BC Lions**
- 1984 – **Winnipeg Blue Bombers**
- 1983 – BC Lions
- 1982 – **Edmonton Eskimos**
- 1981 – **Edmonton Eskimos**
- 1980 – **Edmonton Eskimos**
- 1979 – **Edmonton Eskimos**
- 1978 – **Edmonton Eskimos**
- 1977 – Edmonton Eskimos
- 1976 – Saskatchewan Roughriders
- 1975 – **Edmonton Eskimos**
- 1974 – Edmonton Eskimos
- 1973 – Edmonton Eskimos
- 1972 – Saskatchewan Roughriders
- 1971 – **Calgary Stampeders**
- 1970 – Calgary Stampeders
- 1969 – Saskatchewan Roughriders
- 1968 – Calgary Stampeders
- 1967 – Saskatchewan Roughriders
- 1966 – **Saskatchewan Roughriders**
- 1965 – Winnipeg Blue Bombers
- 1964 – **BC Lions**
- 1963 – BC Lions
- 1962 – **Winnipeg Blue Bombers**
- 1961 – **Winnipeg Blue Bombers**
- 1960 – Edmonton Eskimos
- 1959 – **Winnipeg Blue Bombers**
- 1958 – **Winnipeg Blue Bombers**
- 1957 – Winnipeg Blue Bombers
- 1956 – **Edmonton Eskimos**
- 1955 – **Edmonton Eskimos**
- 1954 – **Edmonton Eskimos**
- 1953 – Winnipeg Blue Bombers
- 1952 – Edmonton Eskimos
- 1951 – Saskatchewan Roughriders
- 1950 – Winnipeg Blue Bombers
- 1949 – Calgary Stampeders
- 1948 – **Calgary Stampeders**
