= 1904 in Canadian football =

== Canadian Football News in 1904 ==
The value of a Try (touchdown) was increased to five points and Goals from a Try was reduced to one point in the ORFU. The QRFU adopted a rule by Tom (King) Clancy of Ottawa that a team must make five yards on its third scrimmage to keep possession of the ball.

== Regular season ==
=== Final regular season standings ===
Note: GP = Games Played, W = Wins, L = Losses, T = Ties, PF = Points For, PA = Points Against, Pts = Points

**Ontario Rugby Football Union**
Team	GP	W	L	T	PF	PA	Pts
First District
**Peterborough Pets**	4	2	2	0	61	57	4
**Toronto Torontos**	4	2	2	0	88	60	4
**Toronto Argonauts**	4	2	2	0	38	70	4
Second District
**Hamilton Tigers**	4	4	0	0	208	21	8
London Kickers	4	2	2	0	41	110	4
Toronto Victorias	4	0	4	0	26	140	0

Quebec Rugby Football Union
Team	GP	W	L	T	PF	PA	Pts
**University of Ottawa**	6	5	1	0	74	32	10
Montreal Football Club	6	4	2	0	61	54	8
Ottawa Rough Riders	6	3	3	0	91	63	6
Montreal Westmounts	6	0	6	0	36	113	0

**Intercollegiate Rugby Football Union**
Team	GP	W	L	T	PF	PA	Pts
**Queen's University**	4	3	1	0	72	32	3
**McGill Redmen**	4	3	1	0	46	32	6
Varsity Blues	4	0	4	0	26	80	0

*Bold text means that they have clinched the playoffs

Manitoba Rugby Football Union
Team	GP	W	L	T	PF	PA	Pts
Winnipeg Rowing Club	4	3	1	0	55	34	6
St.John's Rugby Football Club	4	3	1	0	43	20	6
Winnipeg Rugby Football Club	4	0	4	0	23	67	0

== League Champions ==
Football Union	League Champion
CIRFU	Queen's University
ORFU	Hamilton Tigers
QRFU	Ottawa College
MRFU	Winnipeg Rowing Club

== Playoffs ==
=== MRFU Tie-Breaker ===
Away	Home
Winnipeg Rowing Club 20	St.John's Rugby Football Club 8

- Winnipeg Rowing Club wins the MRFU championship

=== ORFU First District Semi-Final ===
Away	Home
Toronto Argonauts 6	Toronto Torontos 14

- Toronto Torontos advance to the ORFU First District Final.

=== ORFU First District Final ===
Away	Home
Toronto Torontos 21	Peterborough Pets 7

- Toronto advances to the ORFU Final.

=== ORFU Final - Game 1 ===
Away	Home
Hamilton Tigers 32	Toronto Torontos 0

=== ORFU Final - Game 2 ===
Away	Home
Toronto Torontos 15	Hamilton Tigers 43

- Hamilton wins the ORFU Final.

=== CIRFU Final ===
Away	Home
McGill Redmen 0	Queen's University 6

- Queen's wins the CIRFU Final.

== Dominion Championship ==
- No Dominion Final was played this year due to a rules dispute.
