= 1896 in Canadian football =

== Canadian Football News in 1896 ==
In the MRFU, the fall session saw the Winnipeg Football Club (Winnipegs) and the St.John's Rugby Football Club (St.John's) compete. In the spring session of the season, the Royal Canadian Dragoons were added to the competition. The Winnipegs and the St.John's played a final league game to determine the regular season champion. The St.John's received a bye to the MRFU playoff finals while the Winnipegs played the Dragoons in the MRFU playoff semi-final.

=== Final regular season standings ===
Note: GP = Games Played, W = Wins, L = Losses, T = Ties, PF = Points For, PA = Points Against, Pts = Points

Quebec Rugby Football Union
Team	GP	W	L	T	PF	PA	Pts
**Ottawa College**	4	4	0	0	81	14	8
Ottawa City Football Club	4	2	2	0	40	59	4
Montreal Football Club	4	2	2	0	47	25	4
McGill University	4	2	2	0	80	44	4
Britannia Football Club	4	0	4	0	22	128	2

Manitoba Rugby Football Union
Team	GP	W	L	T	PF	PA	Pts
St.John's Rugby Football Club	3	2	1	0	34	23	4
Winnipeg Rugby Football Club	3	1	2	0	23	34	0

- Bold text means that they have clinched the playoffs

== League Champions ==
Football Union	League Champion
ORFU	University of Toronto
QRFU	Ottawa College
MRFU	St.John's Rugby Football Club
Northwest Championship	Winnipeg Rugby Football Club

== Playoffs ==
=== MRFU playoffs ===
MRFU semifinal & final
Winnipeg Football Club 25	Royal Canadian Dragoons 0
St.John's Rugby Football Club 7	Winnipeg Football Club 6
Royal Canadian Dragoons were a late entry to the MRFU

=== ORFU semifinals ===
ORFU Semifinal 1
University of Toronto 18	Queen's University 16
University of Toronto 13	Queen's University 1
University of Toronto advances to the 1896 ORFU Final

ORFU Dominion Semifinal 2
Royal Military College 13	Toronto Athletic Club 8
Royal Military College 1	Toronto Athletic Club 42
Toronto Athletic Club advance to the 1896 ORFU Final

=== ORFU final ===
ORFU Final
University of Toronto 43	Toronto Athletic Club 6
University of Toronto 18	Toronto Athletic Club 16
University of Toronto advance to the 1896 Dominion Championship

== Dominion Championship ==
November 21 1896 Dominion Championship Game: Rosedale Field, Toronto, Ontario
Ottawa College 12	University of Toronto 8
Ottawa College are the 1896 Dominion Champions
