= 1903 in Canadian football =

== News ==
The Ontario Rugby Football Union (ORFU) adopted the Burnside Rules which reduced teams to 12 men per side, instituted the snap-back system of putting the ball in play, required the offensive team to gain 10 yards on three downs, abolished the throw-in from the sidelines, permitted only six men on the line, stated that all goals by kicking were to be worth two points, and the opposition was to line up 10 yards from the defenders on all kicks. The rules were to be made uniform across the country as quickly as possible. The Canadian Intercollegiate Rugby Football Union (CIRFU), Quebec Rugby Football Union (QRFU) and Canadian Rugby Union (CRU) refused to adopt the new rules.

QRFU and CRU reduced their rosters from 15 to 14 players. CRU ruled that possession could not go beyond three scrimmages unless during the third scrimmage the ball was moved five yards on a run or a kick. Ottawa returned to the QRFU and the Manitoba Rugby Football Union (MRFU) moved to a fall schedule.

== Regular season ==
=== Final regular season standings ===
Note: GP = games played, W = wins, L = losses, T = ties, PF = points for, PA = points against, Pts = points

Ontario Rugby Football Union
| Team | GP | W | L | T | PF | PA | Pts |
|---|---|---|---|---|---|---|---|
| Hamilton Tigers | 4 | 4 | 0 | 0 | 139 | 51 | 8 |
| Toronto Torontos | 4 | 2 | 2 | 0 | 73 | 75 | 4 |
| Hamilton WEPC | 4 | 0 | 4 | 0 | 35 | 97 | 0 |

Quebec Rugby Football Union
| Team | GP | W | L | T | PF | PA | Pts |
|---|---|---|---|---|---|---|---|
| Ottawa Rough Riders | 6 | 5 | 1 | 0 | 75 | 31 | 10 |
| Montreal Football Club | 6 | 4 | 2 | 0 | 78 | 43 | 8 |
| University of Ottawa | 6 | 3 | 3 | 0 | 57 | 43 | 6 |
| Britannia Football Club | 6 | 0 | 6 | 0 | 23 | 116 | 0 |

Intercollegiate Rugby Football Union
| Team | GP | W | L | T | Pts |
|---|---|---|---|---|---|
| Varsity Blues | 4 | 3 | 0 | 1 | 7 |
| McGill Redmen | 4 | 2 | 2 | 0 | 4 |
| Queen's University | 4 | 0 | 3 | 1 | 1 |

Manitoba Rugby Football Union
| Team | GP | W | L | T | PF | PA | Pts |
|---|---|---|---|---|---|---|---|
| Winnipeg Shamrocks | 4 | 3 | 1 | 0 | 106 | 36 | 6 |
| Winnipeg Rowing Club | 4 | 2 | 2 | 0 | 38 | 59 | 4 |
| St.John's Rugby Football Club | 4 | 1 | 3 | 0 | 29 | 78 | 2 |

== League champions ==
| Football union | League champion |
|---|---|
| CIRFU | University of Toronto |
| ORFU | Hamilton Tigers |
| QRFU | Ottawa Rough Riders |
| MRFU | Winnipeg Shamrocks |

== Playoffs ==
No dominion final was played this year due to a rules dispute over the newly adopted Burnside Rules used by the ORFU.
