= Calgary Canucks (football) =

General information
- Founded: 1915
- Folded: 1920
- Headquartered: Calgary, Alberta

League / conference affiliations
- Calgary Rugby Football Union; Alberta Rugby Football Union; Western Canada Rugby Football Union

Championships
- League championships: 0; 1915 & 1919

Calgary Canucks was a Canadian football team in the Alberta Rugby Football Union. The team played in the 1915, 1919 and 1920 seasons, winning two championships.

== ARFU season-by-season ==
Season	Name	G	W	L	T	PF	PA	Finish	Playoffs
1915	Canucks	?						?	beat University of Alberta Varsity 18-12 for ARFU championship, lost 17–1 to Regina Rugby Club in western final
1919	Canucks	4	4	0	0	57	20	1st	ARFU championship, lost 13–1 to Regina Rugby Club in western final
1920	Canucks	3	0	3	0	10	50	2nd	
