= Edmonton Boosters =

General information
- Founded: 1930
- Folded: 1932
- Headquartered: Edmonton, Alberta, Canada

League / conference affiliations
- Alberta Rugby Football Union; Western Interprovincial Football Union

Edmonton Boosters was a Canadian football team in the Alberta Rugby Football Union. The team played three seasons between 1930 and 1932 seasons.

== ARFU season-by-season ==
Season	G	W	L	T	PF	PA	Finish	Playoffs
1930	5	1	4	0	42	61	3rd	
1931	4	1	3	0	20	24	2nd	
1932	4	1	3	0	17	7	2nd	
