= 1932 in Canadian football =

== Canadian football news in 1932 ==
The Calgary Altomah-Tigers became the Altomahs.

The Regina Roughriders made history by playing in their fifth consecutive Grey Cup game. This record would last 50 years, only surpassed by the 1977–1982 Edmonton Eskimos. It also marked the fifth straight defeat at the Grey Cup. The Hamilton Tigers took home their third Grey Cup in five years.

== Regular season ==
=== Final regular season standings ===
Note: GP = Games played, W = Wins, L = Losses, T = Ties, PF = Points for, PA = Points against, Pts = Points

**Interprovincial Rugby Football Union**
Team	GP	W	L	T	PF	PA	Pts
**Hamilton Tigers**	6	5	1	0	96	15	10
Montreal AAA Winged Wheelers	6	4	2	0	68	32	8
Toronto Argonauts	6	3	3	0	56	58	6
Ottawa Rough Riders	6	0	6	0	24	139	0

Ontario Rugby Football Union
Team	GP	W	L	T	PF	PA	Pts
**Sarnia Imperials**	6	5	1	0	125	37	10
Toronto Balmy Beach Beachers	6	4	1	1	60	40	9
Hamilton Tiger Cubs	6	2	3	1	66	64	5
St. Michael's College	6	0	6	0	25	135	3

**Intercollegiate Rugby Football Union**
Team	GP	W	L	T	PF	PA	Pts
**Varsity Blues**	6	5	1	0	83	48	10
Western Ontario Mustangs	6	3	2	1	59	39	7
Queen's Golden Gaels	6	1	3	2	43	70	4
McGill Redmen	6	1	4	1	38	66	3

*Bold text means that they had clinched the playoffs.

Manitoba Rugby Football Union
Team	GP	W	L	T	PF	PA	Pts
Winnipeg St.John's	6	5	0	1	101	13	11
Winnipegs	6	3	2	1	47	60	7
Garrison Rugby Club	6	0	6	0	19	94	0

* The Garrison team defaulted one game to each of the Winnipegs and St.John's.

Saskatchewan Rugby Football Union
Team	GP	W	L	T	PF	PA	Pts
Regina Roughriders	6	5	1	0	135	28	10
University of Saskatchewan Varsity	6	5	1	0	38	30	10
Saskatoon Quakers	6	1	5	0	17	112	2
Moose Jaw Maroons	6	1	5	0	30	50	2

* Quakers defaulted final game of season to Varsity.

Alberta Rugby Football Union
Team	GP	W	L	T	PF	PA	Pts
Calgary Altomah-Indians	4	4	0	0	42	4	8
Edmonton Boosters	4	2	2	0	17	7	4
University of Alberta Polar Bears	4	0	4	0	1	49	0

British Columbia Rugby Football Union
Team	GP	W	L	T	PF	PA	Pts
Vancouver Meralomas	6	5	1	0	91	41	10
Vancouver Athletic Club Wolves	6	4	2	0	93	23	8
New Westminster Dodekas	5	2	3	0	61	63	4
Victoria Capitals	5	1	4	0	46	101	2
University of British Columbia Varsity	6	1	5	0	13	76	2

== League Champions ==
Football union	League Champion
IRFU	Hamilton Tigers
WCRFU	Regina Roughriders
CIRFU	University of Toronto
ORFU	Sarnia Imperials
MRFU	Winnipeg St.John's
SRFU	Regina Roughriders
ARFU	Calgary Altomahs
BCRFU	Vancouver Meralomas

== Grey Cup playoffs ==
Note: All dates in 1932

=== SRFU tie-breaker ===
Date	Away	Home
October 29	University of Saskatchewan Varsity 0	Regina Roughriders 20

- Regina advances to the MB/SK semifinal against the Winnipeg St.John's.

=== Semifinals ===
East Semifinal
Date	Away	Home
November 19	Hamilton Tigers 15	Sarnia Imperials 11

- Hamilton advances to the East Final.

Western Semifinal 1
Date	Away	Home
November 2	Calgary Altomahs 5	Vancouver Meralomas 6
November 5	Calgary Altomahs 6	Vancouver Meralomas 4

- Calgary won the total-point series by 11–10. Calgary advances to the Western Final.

Western Semifinal 2
Date	Away	Home
November 4	Winnipeg St.John's 1	Regina Roughriders 9

- Regina advances to the Western Final.

=== Finals ===
Eastern Final
Date	Away	Home
November 26	Hamilton Tigers 9	Toronto Varsity Blues 3

- Hamilton advances to the Grey Cup game.

Western Final
Date	Away	Home
November 11	Regina Roughriders 30	Calgary Altomahs 2

- Regina advances to the Grey Cup game.

== Playoff bracket ==
Quarterfinals
ORFU	Sarnia Imperials	11
IRFU	Hamilton Tigers	15
EAST
CIRFU	University of Toronto
BYE
ARFU	Calgary Altomahs	5-6
BCRFU	Vancouver Meralomas	6-4
WEST
SRFU	Regina Roughriders	9
MRFU	Winnipeg St.John's	1

Semifinals
IRFU	Hamilton Tigers	9
CIRFU	University of Toronto	3
ARFU	Calgary Altomahs	2
SRFU	Regina Roughriders	10

Grey Cup final
IRFU	Hamilton Tigers	25
SRFU	Regina Roughriders	6

== Grey Cup Championship ==
December 3 20th Annual Grey Cup Game: Civic Stadium – Hamilton, Ontario
Regina Roughriders 6	Hamilton Tigers 25
The Hamilton Tigers are the 1932 Grey Cup Champions.

== 1932 Eastern (cfombined IRFU & ORFU) All-Stars selected by Canadian Press ==
Note: During this time most players played both ways, so the All-Star selections do not distinguish between some offensive and defensive positions.

- FW - Don Young, McGill University
- HB - Frank Turville, Hamilton Tigers
- HB - Gord Perry, Montreal AAA Winged Wheelers
- HB - Wally Masters, Ottawa Rough Riders
- QB - Hal Baysinger, Montreal AAA Winged Wheelers
- C - Lou Newton, Montreal AAA Winged Wheelers
- G - Alex Denman, Hamilton Tigers
- G - Pete Jotkus, Montreal AAA Winged Wheelers
- T - Brian Timmis, Hamilton Tigers
- T - Dave Sprague, Hamilton Tigers
- E - Jimmy Keith, Toronto Argonauts
- E - Henri Garbarino, Montreal AAA Winged Wheelers
- Coach - Frank Shaughnessy, McGill University

Note: This was the first Canadian Press eastern all-star selection.

== 1932 Canadian Football Awards ==
- Jeff Russel Memorial Trophy (IRFU MVP) – Alex Denman (OG), Hamilton Tigers
