= Henri Garbarino =

Canadian football player

Profile
- Position: Receiver

Career history
- 1929–33: Montreal AAA Winged Wheelers
- 1934: Ottawa Rough Riders

Awards and highlights
- 4× East All-Star (1929, 1930, 1931, 1932)

Henri Garbarino is a former all-star Canadian football player.

Describe as a "chunky little outside wing", Garbarino was a 4 time all-star with the Montreal AAA Winged Wheelers. He played one final season, in 1934, with the Ottawa Rough Riders before his job transferred him to North Bay, where he took up coaching.
