= Saskatchewan Rugby Football Union =

Defunct Canadian football league

The Saskatchewan Rugby Football Union was a Canadian football league created on September 22, 1910 and disbanded after the 1936 season. It joined the Manitoba Rugby Football Union and the Alberta Rugby Football Union to form the Western Canada Rugby Football Union in 1911.

The Union had been preceded, in 1907, by the Saskatchewan Rugby Football League.

== Teams ==
- Moose Jaw Maroons - 1928 to 1932
- Moose Jaw Millers - 1919 to 1921 & 1927 & 1933 to 1934 & 1936
- Moose Jaw Robin Hoods - 1913 to 1915
- Moose Jaw Tigers - 1910 to 1913
- Regina Boat Club - 1920 to 1922
- Regina Rugby Club + Roughriders - 1910 to 1936
- Saskatoon Quakers - 1920 to 1925 & 1929 to 1932
- Saskatoon Hilltops - 1933 to 1936
- Saskatoon Rugby Club - 1911 to 1919
- University of Saskatchewan Varsity - 1913 to 1922 & 1925 & 1932 to 1935

== SRFU Champions ==
- 1907 Moose Jaw Tigers (in Saskatchewan Rugby Football League)
- 1908 Regina YMCA (in Saskatchewan Rugby Football League)
- 1910 Moose Jaw Tigers
- 1911 Regina Rugby Club
- 1912 Regina Rugby Club
- 1913 Regina Rugby Club
- 1914 Regina Rugby Club
- 1915 Regina Rugby Club
- 1916 Regina Rugby Club
- 1917 World War I
- 1918 World War I
- 1919 Regina Rugby Club
- 1920 Regina Rugby Club
- 1921 Saskatoon Quakers
- 1922 Regina Rugby Club
- 1923 Regina Rugby Club
- 1924 Regina Roughriders
- 1925 Regina Roughriders
- 1926 Regina Roughriders
- 1927 Regina Roughriders
- 1928 suspended play for Tri-City Rugby Football League (won by the Regina Roughriders)
- 1929 Regina Roughriders
- 1930 Regina Roughriders
- 1931 Regina Roughriders
- 1932 Regina Roughriders
- 1933 Regina Roughriders
- 1934 Regina Roughriders
- 1935 Regina Roughriders
- 1936 Moose Jaw Millers

=== Totals ===
- 23 - Regina Rugby Club + Roughriders
- 1 - Moose Jaw Tigers
- 1 - Saskatoon Quakers
- 1 - Moose Jaw Millers
