= 1927 in Canadian football =

== Canadian Football News in 1927 ==
Western Canada Intercollegiate Union was formed.

No senior league games played in the Alberta Rugby Football Union for this year.

== Regular season ==
=== Final regular season standings ===
Note: GP = Games Played, W = Wins, L = Losses, T = Ties, PF = Points For, PA = Points Against, Pts = Points

**Interprovincial Rugby Football Union**
| Team | GP | W | L | T | PF | PA | Pts |
|---|---|---|---|---|---|---|---|
| **Hamilton Tigers** | 6 | 5 | 1 | 0 | 89 | 41 | 10 |
| Ottawa Senators | 6 | 3 | 2 | 1 | 44 | 47 | 7 |
| Toronto Argonauts | 6 | 2 | 3 | 1 | 46 | 56 | 5 |
| Montreal AAA | 6 | 1 | 5 | 0 | 25 | 60 | 2 |

Ontario Rugby Football Union
| Team | GP | W | L | T | PF | PA | Pts |
|---|---|---|---|---|---|---|---|
| **Toronto Balmy Beach Beachers** | 6 | 5 | 1 | 0 | 100 | 19 | 10 |
| Toronto Varsity Orfuns | 6 | 3 | 3 | 0 | 64 | 63 | 6 |
| Camp Borden | 6 | 2 | 4 | 0 | 45 | 73 | 4 |
| Hamilton Tiger Cubs | 6 | 2 | 4 | 0 | 22 | 76 | 4 |

**Intercollegiate Rugby Football Union**
| Team | GP | W | L | T | PF | PA | Pts |
|---|---|---|---|---|---|---|---|
| **Queen's Golden Gaels** | 4 | 3 | 1 | 0 | 36 | 22 | 6 |
| McGill Redmen | 4 | 2 | 2 | 0 | 29 | 35 | 4 |
| Varsity Blues | 4 | 1 | 3 | 0 | 20 | 38 | 2 |

*Bold text means that they have clinched the playoffs

Manitoba Rugby Football Union
| Team | GP | W | L | T | PF | PA | Pts |
|---|---|---|---|---|---|---|---|
| Winnipeg Tammany Tigers | 4 | 3 | 1 | 0 | 54 | 21 | 6 |
| Winnipeg Victorias | 4 | 3 | 1 | 0 | 33 | 21 | 6 |
| Winnipeg St.John's | 4 | 0 | 4 | 0 | 10 | 55 | 0 |

Saskatchewan Rugby Football Union
| Team | GP | W | L | T | PF | PA | Pts |
|---|---|---|---|---|---|---|---|
| **Regina Roughriders** | 3 | 3 | 0 | 0 | 53 | 7 | 6 |
| Moose Jaw Millers | 3 | 0 | 3 | 0 | 7 | 53 | 0 |

British Columbia Rugby Football Union - BC Big Four
| Team | GP | W | L | T | PF | PA | Pts |
|---|---|---|---|---|---|---|---|
| Vancouver Meralomas | 6 | 3 | 1 | 2 | 92 | 43 | 8 |
| University of British Columbia Varsity | 5 | 3 | 1 | 1 | 46 | 31 | 7 |
| Victoria Travellers Football Club | 6 | 2 | 2 | 2 | 91 | 52 | 6 |
| New Westminster Wildcats | 5 | 0 | 4 | 1 | 20 | 123 | 1 |

== League Champions ==
| Football Union | League Champion |
|---|---|
| IRFU | Hamilton Tigers |
| WCRFU | Regina Roughriders |
| CIRFU | Queen's University |
| ORFU | Toronto Balmy Beach |
| MRFU | Winnipeg Tammany Tigers |
| SRFU | Regina Roughriders |
| ARFU | No League Play |
| BCRFU | University of British Columbia |

== Grey Cup playoffs ==
Note: All dates in 1927

=== MRFU Tie-Breaker ===
| Date | Team 1 | Team 2 |
|---|---|---|
| October 29 | Winnipeg Tammany Tigers 10 | Winnipeg Victorias 1 |

- Tammany Tigers advance to the western semi-final

=== BCRFU final ===
| Date | Team 1 | Team 2 |
|---|---|---|
| November 12 | University of British Columbia Varsity 8 | Vancouver Meralomas 5 |

- University of British Columbia Varsity advance to the western final

=== Western semifinal ===
| Date | Away | Home |
|---|---|---|
| November 5 | Regina Roughriders 17 | Winnipeg Tammany Tigers 2 |

- Regina Roughriders advance to the western final

=== Western Finals ===
| Game | Date | Away | Home |
|---|---|---|---|
| 1 | November 16 | Regina Roughriders 13 | University of British Columbia 1 |
| 2 | November 19 | Regina Roughriders 19 | University of British Columbia 0 |

- Manager Ronne Bohem decided that Regina would not go on to play in the Grey Cup game.

=== East final ===
| Date | Away | Home |
|---|---|---|
| November 19 | Hamilton Tigers 21 | Queen's University 6 |

- Hamilton advances to the Grey Cup game.

== Playoff bracket ==
Semifinals
CIRFU | Queen's University | 6
IRFU | Hamilton Tigers | 21

Grey Cup final
IRFU | Hamilton Tigers | 6
ORFU | Toronto Balmy Beach Beachers | 9

== Grey Cup Championship ==
November 26 15th Annual Grey Cup Game: Varsity Stadium - Toronto, Ontario
| Hamilton Tigers 6 | Toronto Balmy Beach Beachers 9 |
The Toronto Balmy Beach Beachers are the 1927 Grey Cup Champions
