= Osborne Village =

Coordinates: 49°52′43″N 97°08′45″W

- Neighbourhood
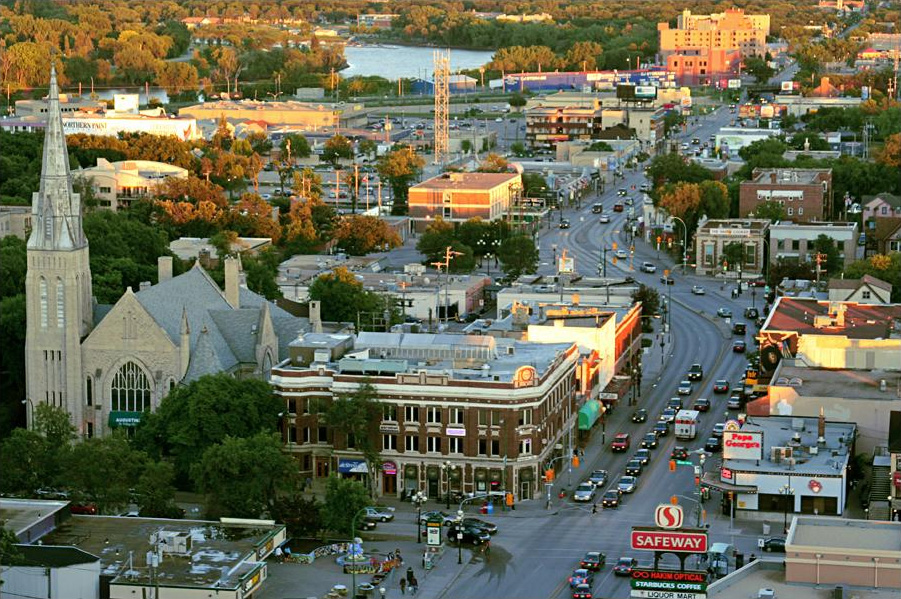
- Aerial shot of Osborne St and River Ave
- Interactive map of Osborne Village
- Country: Canada
- Province: Manitoba
- City: Winnipeg

Area
  - Neighbourhood: 93 ha (231 acres)
  - Metro: 5,306.79 km^{2} (2,048.96 sq mi)

Population (2016)
  - Neighbourhood: 12,745
  - Density: 13,600/km^{2} (35,300/sq mi)
  - Metro: 778,489
- Time zone: UTC-6 (Central Standard Time)
  - Summer (DST): UTC-5 (Central Daylight Time)
- Postal Code: R3L
- Area codes: 204, 431

Osborne Village is a neighbourhood of Winnipeg, Manitoba. The area is bordered by the Assiniboine River on the north and west, Harkness Station on the east, and the Osborne Underpass on the south.

== History ==
Osborne Village derives its name from Osborne Street (Winnipeg Route 62), which runs through the centre of the village area. Osborne Street was named after Lieutenant Colonel William Osborne Smith (1831–1887), the first commanding officer of Military District 10, which included the City of Winnipeg. North of the Assiniboine River, Osborne Street was adjacent to the first Fort Osborne Barracks, on the site of which is now the Provincial Legislature.

Osborne Village is part of the original Fort Rouge area, which became part of the City of Winnipeg as Ward 1 in 1882. The Fort Rouge area started with a population of only 150. The Fort Rouge area began developing as a residential suburb. In 1891, the Parkline became a streetcar route, running down River Avenue from Main Street, then south on Osborne Street. In the village, there was the construction of three bridges over the Assiniboine River: the Osborne Street Bridge (1882), the Maryland Bridge (1894), and the Main Street Bridge (1897).

In the 20th century, Osborne Village's Roslyn Road was developed as a wealthy residential enclave, and by 1911, it was home to the mansions of Winnipeg families. Elsewhere, it was still predominantly middle class. The Victoria Hospital was built early in the century at the corner of Bole Street and River Avenue. The second public park in the city, Assiniboine Park (later to be renamed Fort Rouge Park), was situated along River Avenue in 1894. High-rise apartments on or near the Assiniboine riverfront were developed.

The Midtown Bridge was constructed in 1954 and opened mid-September 1955. The original Osborne Street bridge, which was built in 1882, reconstructed in the 1920s, and again in 1977, was refurbished in 2011/2012.

In 2011, the Shoppers Drug Mart at 43 Osborne Street proposed a plan to purchase the neighbouring building to permit its expansion. The proposal would increase the 10,048-square-foot (933.5 m^{2}) store's footprint by more than double. The city board approved the purchase in December 2011. Citing the threatened loss of two local businesses, Movie Village and Vi-Ann, a Vietnamese restaurant, area residents raised a campaign to appeal and block the purchase, collecting over 4,000 signatures, but the purchase plans were upheld by a city appeals committee in February 2012.

== Demographics and buildings ==
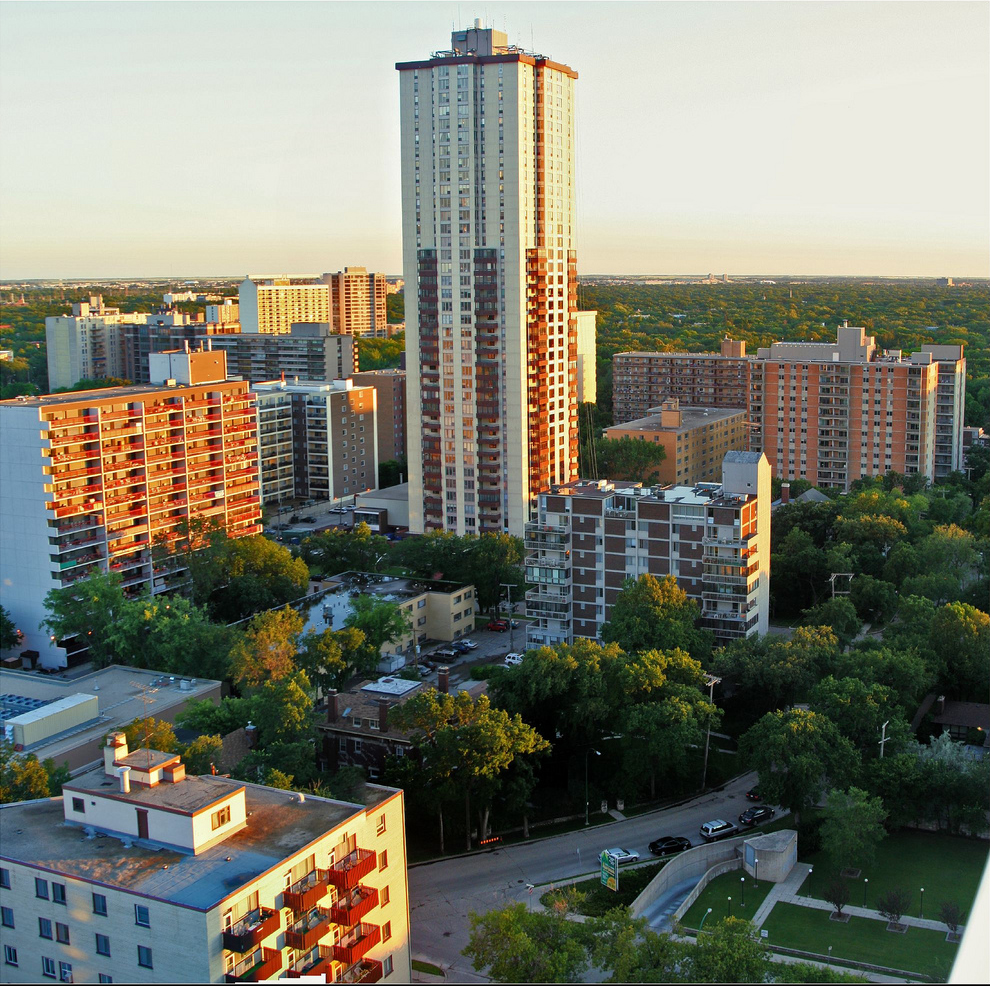
55 Nassau St., a 38-storey skyscraper in Osborne Village

The City of Winnipeg devised a neighbourhood plan for Osborne Village in 2006. As of 2006, Osborne Village has close to 554 buildings. Osborne Village is home to over 175 businesses. Approximately 27 hectares (67 acres) (29%) of the land in the area is residential, with about 15 hectares (37 acres) of the village being used as single-family residential buildings (16%). 11 hectares (27 acres) (12%) of the land is used for commercial purposes. 4 hectares (9.9 acres) (4.5%) are devoted to park space.

The neighbourhood of Osborne Village covers 93 ha (230 acres) of land with a population of approximately 12,745 as of 2016, making it the most densely populated neighbourhood in Winnipeg. Osborne Village has Winnipeg's tallest residential building outside of the downtown core: 55 Nassau Street North. Constructed between 1968 and 1970, the residential complex is 190 metres (620 ft) tall.

689 Osborne Street is home to The Park Theatre at the south end of the street. This venue was originally opened in 1914 as a movie theatre but today is music and theatre venue that host over 300 events per year and was awarded “Venue of the Year” at the Western Canadian Music Awards in 2013 and 2014. The Park Theatre is listed as a historical site by the Manitoba Historical Society.

2016 population and land area
	2016 Population	Sq. km.
River-Osborne	4,750	0.9
Roslyn	4,552	0.3
McMillan	3,445	0.6
Total	12,745	1.8

== Transportation ==
Winnipeg Transit routes that cross through the Village are: 16 Osborne-Selkirk, 18 North Main-Corydon, 60 Pembina, 68 Grosvenor and 635 Misericordia Centre (Replace 99 and 185). Additionally, Osborne Village is served by two Transitway stations: Harkness and Osborne.

in 2018, the intention was announced to build a bicycle-pedestrian bridge to connect McFadyen Park with Fort Rouge Park over the Assiniboine River. While plans were completed in 2020, the project had yet to proceed by 2025.

== Canada Day ==
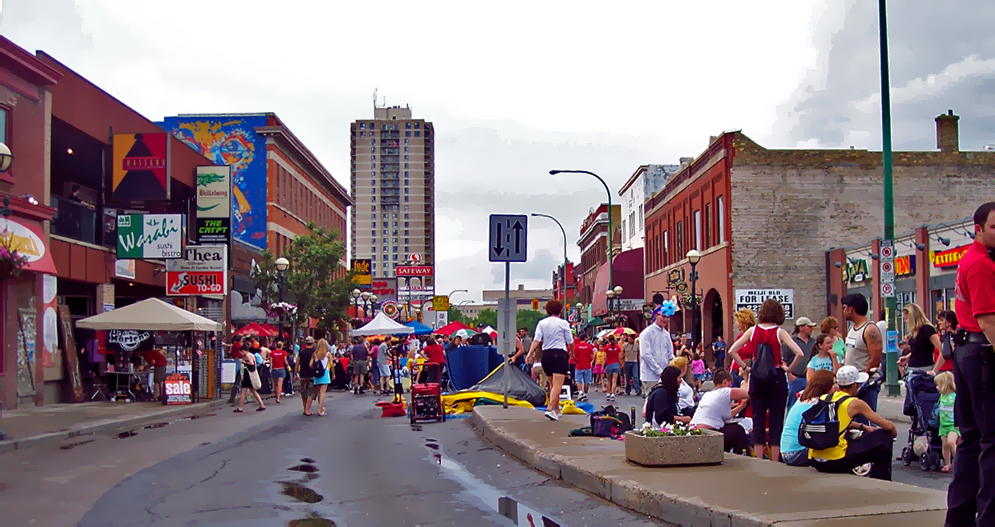
Osborne street during Canada Day, 2006

Osborne Village's Canada Day Celebration, organized by the Osborne BIZ (Business Improvement Zone), was Winnipeg's longest running street festival. The two-day festival featured live music stages, food vendors, artisan booths, and kids' activities. The street block of Osborne Village closed for the duration of the street party. However, as of 2022, the festival was discontinued and was replaced by a weekly summer event called Happy Fridays in the Village.

== Awards ==
- Voted the Best Place to Live in Uptown's 2008 Best of List.
- Awarded "Canada's Great Neighbourhood" title for 2012 by Canadian Institute of Planners
