= 1913 in Canadian football =

The Hamilton Tigers won their first Grey Cup title over the Parkdale Canoe Club.

== Canadian Football News in 1913 ==
The Hamilton Tigers played four exhibition matches in Western Canada, defeating Winnipeg 26–1, Regina 26–4, Moose Jaw 25–1 and Calgary 19–2. This is the first documented East-West series of games.

On September 6, the Hamilton Alerts applied for reinstatement in the ORFU under the name of the East Hamilton Athletic Association, but the request was denied. The Hamilton Rowing Club, however, was accepted.

== Regular season ==
=== Final regular season standings ===
Note: GP = Games Played, W = Wins, L = Losses, T = Ties, PF = Points For, PA = Points Against, Pts = Points

**Interprovincial Rugby Football Union**
Team	GP	W	L	T	PF	PA	Pts
**Hamilton Tigers**	6	5	1	0	143	37	10
Ottawa Rough Riders	6	4	2	0	84	87	8
Toronto Argonauts	6	3	3	0	101	87	6
Montreal Football Club	6	0	6	0	27	144	0

Ontario Rugby Football Union
Team	GP	W	L	T	PF	PA	Pts
**Parkdale Canoe Club**	4	3	1	0	90	47	6
**Toronto Rowing and Athletic Association**	4	2	2	0	79	50	4
Hamilton Rowing Club	4	1	3	0	26	98	2

**Intercollegiate Rugby Football Union**
Team	GP	W	L	T	PF	PA	Pts
**McGill Redmen**	6	5	1	0	177	52	10
**Varsity Blues**	6	3	3	0	116	87	6
Royal Military College	6	2	4	0	69	148	4
Queen's University	6	2	4	0	46	121	4

*Bold text means that they have clinched the playoffs

Manitoba Rugby Football Union
Team	GP	W	L	T	PF	PA	Pts
Winnipeg Rowing Club	4	2	2	0	46	40	4
Winnipeg Tigers	4	2	2	0	36	23	4
St.John's Rugby Football Club	4	2	2	0	32	51	4

Saskatchewan Rugby Football Union
Team	GP	W	L	T	PF	PA	Pts
Regina Rugby Club	4	4	0	0	52	12	8
Saskatoon Rugby Club	4	1	3	0	42	49	2
Moose Jaw Tigers	4	1	3	0	24	59	2

Alberta Rugby Football Union
Team	GP	W	L	T	PF	PA	Pts
Edmonton Eskimos	4	3	1	0	74	28	6
Calgary Tigers	4	3	1	0	46	24	6
University of Alberta Varsity	4	0	4	0	5	73	0

== League Champions ==
Football Union	League Champion
IRFU	Hamilton Tigers
WCRFU	Regina Rugby Club
CIRFU	McGill University
ORFU	Toronto Parkdale
MRFU	Winnipeg Rowing Club
SRFU	Regina Rugby Club
ARFU	Edmonton Eskimos

== Grey Cup playoffs ==
Note: All dates in 1913

=== MRFU semifinal ===
Date	Team 1	Team 2
November 5	St.John's Rugby Football Club 23	Winnipeg Tigers 8

=== MRFU final ===
Date	Team 1	Team 2
November 8	Winnipeg Rowing Club 13	St.John's Rugby Football Club 2

- Winnipeg Rowing Club wins the MRFU championship

=== ARFU final ===
Date	Team 1	Team 2
November 1	Edmonton Eskimos 10	Calgary Tigers 7

* Neutral site game - at Red Deer

- Edmonton Eskimos wins the ARFU championship

=== Western semifinal ===
Date	Away	Home
November 8	Edmonton Eskimos 7	Regina Rugby Club 19

=== Western Final - MRFU–SRFU Inter-League Playoff ===
Date	Away	Home
November 15	Winnipeg Rowing Club 0	Regina Rugby Club 29

=== ORFU Playoff ===
Date	Away	Home
November 22	Toronto Rowing and Athletic Association 5	Parkdale Canoe Club 8

- Parkdale advances to the East Final.

=== East final ===
- McGill declined the invitation to the East Final, making Toronto Parkdale the default winner. Toronto Parkdale advances to the Grey Cup.

== Playoff bracket ==
Quarterfinals
ORFU	Toronto Parkdale	8
ORFU	Toronto Rowing Club	5

Semifinals
IRFU	Hamilton Tigers
BYE
ORFU	Toronto Parkdale
CIRFU	McGill University	Forfeit

Grey Cup final
IRFU	Hamilton Tigers	44
ORFU	Toronto Parkdale	2

== Grey Cup Championship ==
November 29 5th Annual Grey Cup Game: A.A.A. Grounds – Hamilton, Ontario
Toronto Parkdale Canoe Club 2	Hamilton Tigers 44
Hamilton Tigers are the 1913 Grey Cup Champions
