= Wesley College (Manitoba) =

Coordinates: 49°53′27″N 97°09′12″W

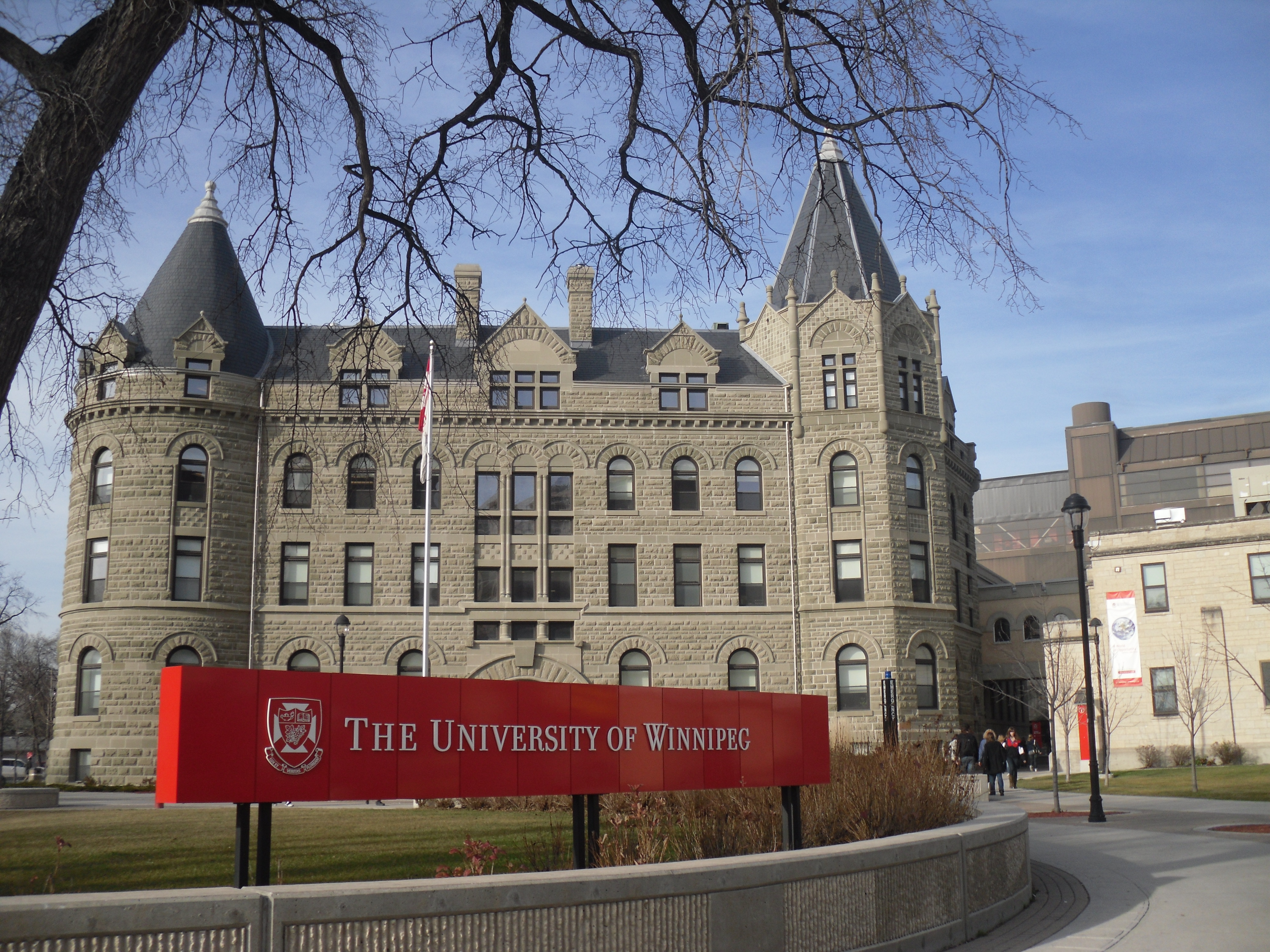
- Wesley Hall, once home to Wesley College
- Active: 1888–1938 - became a part of United College
- Affiliations: 1924 - became part of the United Church of Canada
- Location: Winnipeg, Manitoba, Canada

Wesley College was a college that existed in Winnipeg, Manitoba, Canada, from 1888 to 1938. In 1924, Wesley College became part of the United Church of Canada. It was one of the University of Winnipeg's founding colleges.

== History ==
Wesley College was established in Winnipeg, Manitoba, in 1888 by George Young, a Methodist minister. The college was named for John Wesley, one of the founders of Methodism. Wesley College was originally affiliated with the University of Manitoba.

The first year of its program was taught to seven students in the premises of Grace Church. The first instructor and principal was J. W. Sparling. In 1895, construction of Wesley Hall, designed by George Brown and S. Frank Peters and located on Portage Avenue in Winnipeg, was completed. The building was officially opened on June 3, 1896. In 1912, an annex containing classrooms and a dormitory, designed by architect John Hamilton Gordon Russell, was built. This was later named Sparling Hall in honour of J. W. Sparling. Until the 1960s, this annex served as a women's residence.

By the first decade of the 20th century, Wesley College became an important source of social gospel in Canada.

In 1913, Wesley College entered into an experimental partnership with Manitoba College called the United Colleges. After the colleges returned to being independent in 1914, Wesley College continued to teach both arts and theology independently of the University of Manitoba. In 1917, J. H. Riddell became president of Wesley College.

In 1931, Manitoba College sold its building to the Roman Catholic Church and the building became St. Paul's College. At this time, Manitoba College joined with Wesley College in the teaching of Theology. In 1938, Manitoba College formally joined with Wesley College, both part of the United Church of Canada since 1924, to form United College, which eventually received its own independent charter in 1967 as the University of Winnipeg.

In 2001, Wesley Hall was formally recognized as a historic place by the Canadian Registry of Historic Places. The archival records of Wesley College are housed in the University of Winnipeg Archives.

== Notable alumni ==
- James O. Argue
- James Endicott
- Salome Halldorson
- Robert Hoey
- William Ivens
- Walter McDonald
- Claude C. Robinson, Canadian ice hockey and sports executive
- Ivan Schultz
- Cornelius Wiebe
- Herbert Wright
- J.S. Woodsworth

== Histories ==
- Friesen, Gerald. "Principal J. H. Riddell: The Sane and Safe Leader of Wesley College." In Prairie Spirit: Perspectives on the Heritage of the United Church of Canada in the West, edited by Dennis L. Butcher, et al. Winnipeg: University of Manitoba Press, 1985.
