= 1926 in Canadian football =

== Canadian Football News in 1926 ==
The British Columbia Rugby Football Union was formed on September 1.

Records indicate that while there were exhibition and playoff games, there was no league play in the Saskatchewan Rugby Football Union.

== Regular season ==
=== Final regular season standings ===
Note: GP = Games Played, W = Wins, L = Losses, T = Ties, PF = Points For, PA = Points Against, Pts = Points

**Interprovincial Rugby Football Union**
Team	GP	W	L	T	PF	PA	Pts
**Ottawa Senators**	6	5	1	0	72	57	10
Hamilton Tigers	6	3	3	0	67	45	6
Toronto Argonauts	6	3	3	0	53	55	6
Montreal AAA	6	1	5	0	48	83	2

Ontario Rugby Football Union
Team	GP	W	L	T	PF	PA	Pts
**Toronto Balmy Beach Beachers**	5	5	0	0	47	18	10
Toronto Varsity Orfuns	6	3	3	0	75	66	6
Camp Borden	6	3	3	0	55	51	6
Hamilton Tiger Cubs	5	0	5	0	24	63	0

*Bold text means that they have clinched the playoffs

Intercollegiate Rugby Football Union
Team	GP	W	L	T	PF	PA	Pts
**Queen's Golden Gaels**	4	2	2	0	34	25	4
**Varsity Blues**	4	2	2	0	26	20	4
**McGill Redmen**	4	2	2	0	25	40	4

Manitoba Rugby Football Union
Team	GP	W	L	T	PF	PA	Pts
**Winnipeg St.John's**	6	4	2	0	63	27	8
Winnipeg Victorias	6	4	2	0	49	41	8
Winnipeg Tammany Tigers	5	2	3	0	33	58	4
University of Manitoba Varsity	5	1	4	0	11	30	2

* Final league game was cancelled

Western Inter-Collegiate Rugby Football Union - 2 game total points series
Team	GP	W	L	T	PF	PA	Pts
University of Alberta Polar Bears	2	1	1	0	29	12	2
University of Saskatchewan Varsity	2	1	1	0	12	29	2

British Columbia Rugby Football Union - BC Big Three
Team	GP	W	L	T	PF	PA	Pts
Victoria Travellers Football Club	3	2	0	1	33	18	5
Vancouver Meralomas	3	1	1	1	24	15	3
University of British Columbia Varsity	3	0	0	0	6	30	0

== League Champions ==
Football Union	League Champion
IRFU	Ottawa Senators
WCRFU	Regina Roughriders
CIRFU	University of Toronto
ORFU	Toronto Balmy Beach
MRFU	Winnipeg St.John's
SRFU	Regina Roughriders
ARFU	University of Alberta
BCRFU	Victoria Travellers Football Club

== Grey Cup playoffs ==
Note: All dates in 1926

=== MRFU Tie-Breaker ===
Date	Team 1	Team 2
November 8	Winnipeg St.John's 14	Winnipeg Victorias 5

- Winnipeg St.John's advance to western semi-final

=== WCRFU semifinal ===
Date	Away	Home
November 13	Winnipeg St.John's 5	Regina Roughriders 13

- In overtime, Regina advances to Final

Date	Away	Home
November 13	University of Alberta Polar Bears 21	Victoria Travellers 2

- University of Alberta advances to Final

=== WCRFU final ===
Date	Away	Home
November 20	Regina Roughriders 13	University of Alberta Polar Bears 1

- The Regina Roughriders qualified for the Grey Cup but with their season ending in mid November, did not want to wait for the eastern clubs to finish their playoffs

=== CIRFU semifinal ===
Date	Away	Home
November 20	Varsity Blues 12	McGill Redmen 2

- Varsity advances to the CIRFU Final.

=== CIRFU final ===
Date	Away	Home
November 27	Queen's Golden Gaels 0	Varsity Blues 8

- Varsity advances to the Grey Cup.

=== East final ===
Date	Away	Home
November 20	Ottawa Senators 7	Toronto Balmy Beach Beachers 6

- Ottawa advances to the Grey Cup game.

== Playoff bracket ==
Quarterfinals
CIRFU	Toronto Varsity Blues	12
CIRFU	McGill Redmen	2

Semifinals
IRFU	Ottawa Senators	7
ORFU	Toronto Balmy Beach Beachers	6
CIRFU	Toronto Varsity Blues	8
CIRFU	Queen's Golden Gaels	0

Grey Cup final
IRFU	Ottawa Senators	10
CIRFU	Toronto Varsity Blues	7

== Grey Cup Championship ==
December 4 14th Annual Grey Cup Game: Varsity Stadium - Toronto, Ontario
Ottawa Senators 10	Toronto Varsity Blues 7
The Ottawa Senators are the 1926 Grey Cup Champions

This was the final time a university team made it to the Grey Cup final. Clubs in the Intercollegiate Rugby Football Union continued to play for the title until 1937, but could not make it past the eastern playoffs.
