= Alberta Rugby Football Union =

Defunct Canadian football association

The Alberta Rugby Football Union was formed on September 25, 1911, and governed the newly emerging and evolving sport of football in the province for over 2 decades before it was disbanded in 1936. First the Calgary Rugby Football Union (CRFU) was created on September 29, 1908. The CRFU would play the champion from Edmonton to determine the winner of the Alberta Rugby Football League for 4 seasons from 1907 to 1910. After that the Alberta Rugby Football Union was formed in 1911. It joined the Manitoba Rugby Football Union and the Saskatchewan Rugby Football Union to form the Western Canada Rugby Football Union (WCRFU) in 1911.

Alberta Rugby Football Union teams won three WCRFU championships and lost two Grey Cup games in 22 years of competition.

With the formation of the WCRFU in 1911, the ARFU Champion would compete in a playoff with the winners of the other Western Canadian unions to determine the WCRFU Champion. After reaching an agreement with the Eastern Canadian based Canadian Rugby Union in 1921, the WCRFU was able to compete in the Grey Cup Championship game. That year, the AFRU champion Edmonton Eskimos (no relation to the modern team) won the WCRFU championship to become the first ever western team to compete for the Grey Cup.

== Teams ==
Team	Years
Edmonton Rugby Foot-ball Club, Edmonton Esquimaux, Eskimos, Elks	1911–1913, 1920–1924, 1928–1929

- Edmonton Rugby Foot-ball Club + Edmonton Esquimaux + Eskimos + Elks - 1911 to 1913 & 1920 to 1924 & 1928 to 1929
- Calgary Rugby Foot-ball Club + Calgary Tigers + 50th Battalions + Altomahs - 1911 to 1914 & 1919 to 1920 & 1928 to 1934
- Calgary Canucks - 1915 & 1919 to 1920
- University of Alberta Varsity + Polar Bears + Golden Bears - 1913 to 1921 & 1923 & 1925 to 1926 & 1928 to 1930 & 1932 to 1936
- Calgary Bronks - 1935 to 1936
- Calgary YMCA - 1908 to 1910 & 1912
- Calgary Rough Riders - 1911
- Hillhurst Hornets - 1908 to 1909
- Calgary Rugby Club - 1921
- Edmonton YMCA - 1911
- Edmonton Civics - 1914
- Edmonton Canucks - 1919
- Edmonton Harlequins - 1922
- Edmonton Boosters - 1930 to 1932
- Edmonton Hi-Grads - 1936
- Lethbridge Bulldogs - 1934 to 1936

== Champions ==
- 1891 Edmonton Rugby Foot-ball Club
- 1896 Calgary City Rugby Football Club
- 1899 Edmonton Rugby Football Club
- 1907 Alberta Rugby Football League - Edmonton City Rugby Foot-Ball Club
- 1908 Alberta Rugby Football League - Edmonton Esquimaux
- 1909 Alberta Rugby Football League - Calgary Tigers
- 1910 Alberta Rugby Football League - Calgary Tigers
  - Start of Alberta Rugby Football Union
- 1911 Calgary Tigers - WCRFU Champions
- 1912 Calgary Tigers
- 1913 Edmonton Eskimos
- 1914 University of Alberta Varsity
- 1915 Calgary Canucks
- 1916 ARFU season suspended (World War I)
- 1917 ARFU season suspended (World War I)
- 1918 ARFU season suspended (World War I)
- 1919 Calgary Canucks
- 1920 Calgary Tigers
- 1921 Edmonton Eskimos - 9th Grey Cup
- 1922 Edmonton Elks - 10th Grey Cup
- 1923 Edmonton Eskimos
- 1924 Calgary 50th Battalion
- 1925 University of Alberta Polar Bears
- 1926 University of Alberta Polar Bears (declared provincial champions)
- 1927 No senior football played in Alberta
- 1928 Edmonton Eskimos
- 1929 Calgary Tigers
- 1930 Calgary Tigers
- 1931 Calgary Altomah-Tigers
- 1932 Calgary Altomahs
- 1933 Calgary Altomahs
- 1934 University of Alberta Golden Bears
- 1935 Calgary Bronks
- 1936 Calgary Bronks "B" side

=== Totals ===
- 9 - Calgary Tigers + 50th Battalions + Altomahs
- 5 - Edmonton Esquimaux + Eskimos + Elks
- 4 - University of Alberta Varsity + Polar Bears + Golden Bears
- 2 - Calgary Bronks + Bronks "B" side
- 2 - Calgary Canucks
