= 1921 in Canadian football =

== Canadian Football News in 1921 ==
Western Canada Rugby Football Union joined the CRU and challenged for the Grey Cup. The Edmonton Eskimos became the first Western team to play in a Grey Cup game, but lost to the Toronto Argonauts 23–0.

Rule changes included reducing players from 14 to 12 per side; putting ball into play by snapping it back; limit of 18 players with substitutes permitted freely.

== Regular season ==
=== Final regular season standings ===
Note: GP = Games Played, W = Wins, L = Losses, T = Ties, PF = Points For, PA = Points Against, Pts = Points

**Interprovincial Rugby Football Union**
Team	GP	W	L	T	PF	PA	Pts
**Toronto Argonauts**	6	6	0	0	167	35	10
Ottawa Rough Riders	6	3	3	0	77	71	6
Hamilton Tigers	6	3	3	0	102	79	6
Montreal AAA	6	0	6	0	29	190	0

Ontario Rugby Football Union
Team	GP	W	L	T	PF	PA	Pts
**Toronto Parkdale Canoe Club**	4	4	0	0	104	25	8
St. Brigid's Football Club	3	1	2	0	26	72	2
Torontos	3	0	3	0	21	54	0

**Intercollegiate Rugby Football Union**
Team	GP	W	L	T	Pts
**Varsity Blues**	4	2	1	1	5
Queen's Tricolour	4	2	2	0	4
McGill Redmen	4	1	2	1	3

*Bold text means that they have clinched the playoffs

Manitoba Rugby Football Union
Team	GP	W	L	T	PF	PA	Pts
**Winnipeg Victorias**	4	4	0	0	59	37	8
Winnipeg Tammany Tigers	4	2	2	0	53	41	4
University of Manitoba Varsity	4	0	4	0	53	87	0

Saskatchewan Rugby Football Union
Team	GP	W	L	T	PF	PA	Pts
Southern Saskatchewan
**Regina Rugby Club**	4	4	0	0	86	11	8
Regina Boat Club	4	2	2	0	34	28	4
Moose Jaw Millers	4	0	4	0	12	93	0
Northern Saskatchewan
**Saskatoon Quakers**	3	2	1	0	43	18	4
University of Saskatchewan Varsity	3	1	2	0	18	43	2

Alberta Rugby Football Union
Team	GP	W	L	T	PF	PA	Pts
**Edmonton Eskimos**	3	3	0	0	148	5	6
University of Alberta Varsity	4	1	3	0	35	113	2
Calgary Rugby Club	3	1	2	0	39	104	2

* Final game of the season was cancelled - not necessary

== League Champions ==
Football Union	League Champion
IRFU	Toronto Argonauts
WCRFU	Edmonton Eskimos
CIRFU	University of Toronto
ORFU	Toronto Parkdale
MRFU	Winnipeg Victorias
SRFU	Saskatoon Quakers
ARFU	Edmonton Eskimos

== Grey Cup playoffs ==
Note: All dates in 1921

=== SRFU Playoff ===
Date	Away	Home
November 4	Regina Rugby Club 6	Saskatoon 9

- Regina won the first game (score 10 to 8) played on October 29. After a successful protest, the game was replayed on November 4.
- Saskatoon advances to the WCRFU semifinal

=== Eastern semifinal ===
Date	Away	Home
November 19	Toronto Varsity Blues 12	Toronto Argonauts 20

- Toronto Argonauts advance to the Eastern Final.

=== Eastern final ===
Date	Away	Home
November 26	Toronto Parkdale Canoe Club 8	Toronto Argonauts 16

- Toronto Argonauts advance to the Grey Cup.

=== Western semifinal ===
Date	Away	Home
November 7	Saskatoon Quakers 1	Winnipeg Victorias 16

=== Western final ===
Date	Away	Home
November 14	Edmonton Eskimos 16	Winnipeg Victorias 6

- Edmonton advances to the Grey Cup

== Playoff bracket ==
Quarterfinals
ORFU	Toronto Parkdale
BYE
EAST
IRFU	Toronto Argonauts	20
CIRFU	University of Toronto	12
ARFU	Edmonton Eskimos
BYE
WEST
MRFU	Winnipeg Victorias	16
SRFU	Saskatoon Quakers	1

Semifinals
ORFU	Toronto Parkdale	8
IRFU	Toronto Argonauts	16
ARFU	Edmonton Eskimos	16
MRFU	Winnipeg Victorias	6

Grey Cup final
IRFU	Toronto Argonauts	23
ARFU	Edmonton Eskimos	0

== Grey Cup Championship ==
December 3 9th Annual Grey Cup Game: Varsity Stadium – Toronto, Ontario
Edmonton Eskimos 0	Toronto Argonauts 23
Toronto Argonauts are the 1921 Grey Cup Champions

== 1921 Toronto Globe Eastern All-Stars ==
NOTE: During this time most players played both ways, so the All-Star selections do not distinguish between some offensive and defensive positions.

- FW - Warren Synder, University of Toronto
- HB - Harry Batstone, Toronto Argonauts
- HB - Joe Breen, Toronto Parkdale
- HB - Lionel Conacher, Toronto Argonauts
- QB - Johnny Evans, Queen's University
- QB - Hugh Cochrane, Toronto Argonauts
- C - Lionel Shoebottom, Toronto Parkdale
- C - Jimmy Douglas, Toronto Argonauts
- G - R. McCombe, McGill University
- G - Harold Pugh, Toronto Argonauts
- G - ???, Hamilton Tigers
- T - Doug Ambridge, McGill University
- T - John McKelvey, Queen's University
- T - Alex Romeril, Toronto Argonauts
- E - Ernie Rolph, University of Toronto
- E - Bud Thomas, Ottawa Rough Riders
