= 1924 in Canadian football =

== Canadian football news in 1924 ==
Coach Bill Hughes of Queen's introduced the use of films as a coaching technique.

The numbering of players, although used for years, was made compulsory.

The Regina Rugby Club became the Regina Roughriders.

== Regular season ==
=== Final regular season standings ===
Note: GP = Games Played, W = Wins, L = Losses, T = Ties, PF = Points For, PA = Points Against, Pts = Points

**Interprovincial Rugby Football Union**
Team	GP	W	L	T	PF	PA	Pts
**Hamilton Tigers**	6	5	1	0	60	31	10
Toronto Argonauts	6	4	2	0	51	39	8
Ottawa Rough Riders	6	2	4	0	29	33	4
Montreal AAA	6	1	5	0	28	65	2

Ontario Rugby Football Union
Team	GP	W	L	T	PF	PA	Pts
**Toronto Balmy Beach Beachers**	4	3	1	0	28	30	6
Toronto Varsity Orfuns	4	2	2	0	29	20	4
Hamilton Rowing Club	4	1	3	0	47	54	2

**Intercollegiate Rugby Football Union**
Team	GP	W	L	T	PF	PA	Pts
**Queen's University**	4	4	0	0	51	27	8
Varsity Blues	4	1	3	0	36	35	2
McGill Redmen	4	1	3	0	26	51	2

*Bold text means that they have clinched the playoffs

Manitoba Rugby Football Union
Team	GP	W	L	T	PF	PA	Pts
**Winnipeg Victorias**	4	4	0	0	80	24	8
Winnipeg Tammany Tigers	4	2	2	0	46	66	4
University of Manitoba Varsity	4	0	4	0	29	65	0

Saskatchewan Rugby Football Union
Team	GP	W	L	T	PF	PA	Pts
**Regina Roughriders**	6	4	2	0	41	43	8
Saskatoon Quakers	6	2	4	0	43	41	4

Alberta Rugby Football Union
Team	GP	W	L	T	PF	PA	Pts
Calgary 50th Battalion	2	1	1	0	11	9	2
Edmonton Eskimos	2	1	1	0	9	11	2

== League Champions ==
Football Union	League Champion
IRFU	Hamilton Tigers
WCRFU	Winnipeg Victorias
CIRFU	Queen's University
ORFU	Toronto Balmy Beach
MRFU	Winnipeg Victorias
SRFU	Regina Roughriders
ARFU	Calgary 50th Battalion

== Grey Cup playoffs ==
Note: All dates in 1924

=== ARFU playoffs ===
ARFU Playoffs Games 1 & 2
Date	Away	Home
October 11	Calgary 50th Battalion - 1	Edmonton Eskimos - 14
October 18	Edmonton Eskimos 1	Calgary 50th Battalion 15

- Calgary won total points series 16-15.

ARFU Finals Games 1 & 2
Date	Away	Home
October 25	Calgary 50th Battalion 8	University of Alberta Varsity 0
November 1	University of Alberta Varsity 1	Calgary 50th Battalion 13

- Calgary won the total points series 21-1.

=== East final ===
Date	Away	Home
November 22	Queen's University 11	Hamilton Tigers 1

- Queen's advances to the Grey Cup.

=== West semifinal ===
Date	Away	Home
November 8	Regina Roughriders 5	Winnipeg Victorias 22

=== West final ===
Date	Away	Home
November 15	Winnipeg Victorias 11	Calgary 50th Battalion 9

- Winnipeg wins the west but did not challenge for the Grey Cup

== Playoff bracket ==
Semifinals
CIRFU	Queen's University	11
IRFU	Hamilton Tigers	1

Grey Cup final
CIRFU	Queen's University	16
ORFU	Toronto Balmy Beach Beachers	3

== Grey Cup Championship ==
November 29 12th Annual Grey Cup Game: Varsity Stadium - Toronto, Ontario
Queen's University 11	Toronto Balmy Beach Beachers 3
Queen's University are the 1924 Grey Cup Champions
