= 1925 in Canadian football =

== Canadian Football News in 1925 ==
McGill coach Frank Shaughnessy introduced the huddle system to Canadian football. It was at first called the Conference System.

Calgary 50th Battalion became the Tigers.

The Ottawa Rough Riders club changed its name to the Senators.

== Regular season ==
=== Final regular season standings ===
Note: GP = Games Played, W = Wins, L = Losses, T = Ties, PF = Points For, PA = Points Against, Pts = Points

**Interprovincial Rugby Football Union**
Team	GP	W	L	T	PF	PA	Pts
**Ottawa Senators**	6	4	1	1	48	24	9
Montreal AAA	6	3	3	0	27	43	6
Hamilton Tigers	6	2	3	1	37	42	5
Toronto Argonauts	6	2	4	0	39	42	4

Ontario Rugby Football Union
Team	GP	W	L	T	PF	PA	Pts
**Toronto Balmy Beach Beachers**	6	5	1	0	73	37	10
Camp Borden	6	4	2	0	53	32	8
Hamilton Rowing Club	6	2	4	0	42	78	4
Toronto Varsity Orfuns	6	1	5	0	43	66	2

**Intercollegiate Rugby Football Union**
Team	GP	W	L	T	PF	PA	Pts
**Queen's University**	4	4	0	0	47	7	8
Varsity Blues	4	1	3	0	24	39	2
McGill Redmen	4	1	3	0	16	41	2

*Bold text means that they have clinched the playoffs

Manitoba Rugby Football Union
Team	GP	W	L	T	PF	PA	Pts
Winnipeg Tammany Tigers	6	4	2	0	52	28	8
University of Manitoba Varsity	6	4	2	0	43	42	8
Winnipeg Victorias	6	3	3	0	46	31	6
Winnipeg St.John's	6	1	5	0	17	57	2

Saskatchewan Rugby Football Union
Team	GP	W	L	T	PF	PA	Pts
**Regina Roughriders**							
Saskatoon Quakers	4	2	2	0	30	30	4
University of Saskatchewan Varsity	4	2	2	0	30	30	4

Alberta Rugby Football Union
Team	GP	W	L	T	PF	PA	Pts
University of Alberta Polar Bears	2	2	0	0	37	15	4
Calgary Tigers	2	0	2	0	15	37	0

== League Champions ==
Football Union	League Champion
IRFU	Ottawa Senators
WCRFU	Winnipeg Tammany Tigers
CIRFU	Queen's University
ORFU	Toronto Balmy Beach
MRFU	Winnipeg Tammany Tigers
SRFU	Regina Roughriders
ARFU	University of Alberta

== Grey Cup playoffs ==
Note: All dates in 1925

=== MRFU Tie-Breaker ===
Date	Team 1	Team 2
November 9	Winnipeg Tammany Tigers 11	University of Manitoba Varsity 0

- Winnipeg Tammany Tigers advance to the western playoff

=== SRFU final ===
Date	Team 1	Team 2
October 31	Regina Roughriders 30	Saskatoon Quakers 0

- Regina Roughriders advance to the western semi final

=== West semifinal ===
Date	Away	Home
November 10	Regina Roughriders	University of Alberta Polar Bears

- Game cancelled due to winter conditions. University of Alberta withdrew from competition.

=== East semifinal ===
Date	Away	Home
November 21	Queen's University 12	Toronto Balmy Beach Beachers 2

- Queen's advances to the East Final.

=== East final ===
Date	Away	Home
November 29	Queen's Golden Gaels 2	Ottawa Senators 11

- Ottawa advances to the Grey Cup.

=== West final ===
Date	Away	Home
November 14	Winnipeg Tammany Tigers 11	Regina Roughriders 1

- Winnipeg advances to the Grey Cup final.

== Playoff bracket ==
Quarterfinals
IRFU	Ottawa Senators
BYE
EAST
ORFU	Toronto Balmy Beach	9
CIRFU	Queen's University	21
MRFU	Winnipeg Tammany Tigers
BYE
WEST
SRFU	Regina Roughriders
ARFU	University of Alberta	Forfeit

Semifinals
IRFU	Ottawa Senators	11
CIRFU	Queen's University	2
MRFU	Winnipeg Tammany Tigers	11
SRFU	Regina Roughriders	1

Grey Cup final
IRFU	Ottawa Senators	24
MRFU	Winnipeg Tammany Tigers	1

== Grey Cup Championship ==
December 5 13th Annual Grey Cup Game: Lansdowne Park - Ottawa, Ontario
Winnipeg Tammany Tigers 1	Ottawa Senators 24
The Ottawa Senators are the 1925 Grey Cup Champions
