= 1928 in Canadian football =

== Canadian Football News in 1928 ==
The Tri-City Rugby Football League was formed on August 25 and consisted of Moose Jaw, Regina and two teams from Winnipeg. The league played an unbalanced schedule. Provincial champions for the MRFU and SRFU were determined by head-to-head games of provincial rivals in the Tri-City League. The Union disbanded the following year because of travel expenses. Saskatchewan and Manitoba reverted to playing games within their respective provinces.

First radio play-by-play broadcast of a Grey Cup Game was on December 1.

Jack Hamilton served as president of the Western Interprovincial Football Union for the season.

== Regular season ==
=== Final regular season standings ===
Note: GP = Games Played, W = Wins, L = Losses, T = Ties, PF = Points For, PA = Points Against, Pts = Points

**Interprovincial Rugby Football Union**
Team	GP	W	L	T	PF	PA	Pts
**Hamilton Tigers**	6	6	0	0	90	22	12
Montreal AAA	6	3	3	0	62	34	6
Toronto Argonauts	6	1	4	1	30	45	3
Ottawa Senators	6	1	4	1	22	103	3

Ontario Rugby Football Union
Team	GP	W	L	T	PF	PA	Pts
Group No. 1
**Sarnia Imperials**	4	2	2	0	35	28	4
**Toronto Varsity Orfuns**	4	2	2	0	31	30	4
**Kitchener Panthers**	4	2	2	0	20	28	4
Group No. 2
**Toronto Balmy Beach Beachers**	4	4	0	0	103	6	8
Camp Borden	4	2	2	0	52	46	4
Hamilton Tiger Cubs	4	0	4	0	11	114	0

**Intercollegiate Rugby Football Union**
Team	GP	W	L	T	PF	PA	Pts
**McGill Redmen**	4	3	1	0	39	20	6
Queen's Golden Gaels	4	2	2	0	29	24	4
Varsity Blues	4	1	3	0	38	52	2

*Bold text means that they have clinched the playoffs

Tri-City Rugby Football League
Team	GP	W	L	T	PF	PA	Pts
Regina Roughriders	6	6	0	0	125	11	12
Winnipeg St.John's	5	3	1	1	43	28	7
Winnipeg Tammany Tigers	5	1	4	0	27	64	2
Moose Jaw Maroons	6	0	5	1	12	104	1

Alberta Rugby Football Union
Team	GP	W	L	T	PF	PA	Pts
Edmonton Eskimos	4	3	1	0	31	26	6
University of Alberta Polar Bears	4	2	2	0	44	36	4
Calgary Tigers	4	1	3	0	32	45	2

BCRFU - BC Big Four
Team	GP	W	L	T	PF	PA	Pts
University of British Columbia Varsity	6	6	0	0	114	25	12
Vancouver Meralomas	6	3	3	0	89	61	6
Victoria Travellers Football Club	6	2	4	0	59	66	4
New Westminster Wildcats	6	1	5	0	26	136	2

== League Champions ==
Football Union	League Champion
IRFU	Hamilton Tigers
WCRFU	Regina Roughriders
CIRFU	McGill University
ORFU	University of Toronto Orfuns
Tri-City Rugby Football League	Regina Roughriders
MRFU	suspended play
SRFU	suspended play
ARFU	Edmonton Eskimos
BCRFU	University of British Columbia

== Grey Cup playoffs ==
Note: All dates in 1928

=== Western Inter-Collegiate Rugby Football Union - total points series ===
Date	Away	Home
October 27	University of Manitoba 6	University of Alberta Polar Bears 20
November 21	University of Alberta Polar Bears 20	University of British Columbia Varsity 11
November 24	University of Alberta Polar Bears 13	University of British Columbia Varsity 6

- University of Alberta Polar Bears win series.

=== ORFU semifinals ===
Date	Away	Home
November 12	Toronto Balmy Beach Beachers 0	Toronto Varsity Orfuns 1

- Varsity advances to the ORFU Final.

=== ORFU tie-breaker ===
Date	Away	Home
November 14	Sarnia Imperials 16	Kitchener Panthers 6

- Sarnia advances to the ORFU Final.

=== ORFU final ===
Date	Away	Home
November 17	Sarnia Imperials 0	Toronto Varsity Orfuns 6

- Varsity advances to the East Final.

=== East final ===
Date	Away	Home
November 24	Toronto Varsity Orfuns 5	Hamilton Tigers 28

- Hamilton advanced to the East Final game due to McGill declining to participate.

=== Western final ===
Date	Away	Home
October 27	Winnipeg St.John's 1	Regina Roughriders 12

- Regina advances to the Grey Cup game due to the Alberta and BC champions declining to participate due to the length of their seasons.

== Playoff bracket ==
Quarterfinals
IRFU	Hamilton Tigers
CIRFU	McGill University	Forfeit
EAST
ORFU	Toronto Varsity Orfuns	6
ORFU	Sarnia Imperials	0
WEST
ARFU	Edmonton Eskimos	no game
BCRFU	UBC	no game

Semifinals
IRFU	Hamilton Tigers	28
ORFU	Toronto Varsity Orfuns	6
Tri City	Regina Roughriders	12
Tri City	Winnipeg St.John's	1

Grey Cup final
IRFU	Hamilton Tigers	30
SRFU	Regina Roughriders	0

== Grey Cup Championship ==
December 1 16th Annual Grey Cup Game: A.A.A. Grounds - Hamilton, Ontario
Regina Roughriders 0	Hamilton Tigers 30
The Hamilton Tigers are the 1928 Grey Cup Champions

== 1928 Canadian Football Awards ==
- Jeff Russel Memorial Trophy (IRFU MVP) – Ernie Cox (C), Hamilton Tigers
