= 1914 in Canadian football =

== Canadian football news in 1914 ==
The remnants of the Hamilton Alerts operated separately from any Union for several seasons before fading from the scene. The CRU appointed head linesmen and the CIRFU adopted a three-yard interference rule while the IRFU adopted a residence rule.

== Regular season ==
=== Final regular season standings ===
Note: GP = Games played, W = Wins, L = Losses, T = Ties, PF = Points for, PA = Points against, Pts = Points

**Interprovincial Rugby Football Union**
Team	GP	W	L	T	PF	PA	Pts
**Hamilton Tigers**	6	5	1	0	105	34	10
**Toronto Argonauts**	6	5	1	0	145	47	10
Montreal Football Club	6	2	4	0	62	108	4
Ottawa Rough Riders	6	0	6	0	39	162	0

Ontario Rugby Football Union
Team	GP	W	L	T	PF	PA	Pts
**Hamilton Rowing Club**	4	3	1	0	57	28	6
Toronto Rowing and Athletic Association	4	2	2	0	63	41	4
St. Patrick's College	4	1	3	0	27	77	2

**Intercollegiate Rugby Football Union**
Team	GP	W	L	T	PF	PA	Pts
**McGill Redmen**	4	3	1	0	59	63	6
**Varsity Blues**	4	3	1	0	79	29	6
Queen's University	4	0	4	0	47	93	0

*Bold text means that they have clinched the playoffs

Manitoba Rugby Football Union
Team	GP	W	L	T	PF	PA	Pts
Winnipeg Rowing Club	5	3	2	0	43	36	6
Winnipeg Tigers	5	2	3	0	36	43	4

Saskatchewan Rugby Football Union
Team	GP	W	L	T	PF	PA	Pts
**South**
Regina Rugby Club	4	4	0	0	70	22	8
Moose Jaw Robin Hoods	4	0	4	0	22	70	0
**North**
University of Saskatchewan Varsity	2	2	0	0	22	10	4
Saskatoon Rugby Club	2	0	2	0	10	22	0

Alberta Rugby Football Union - North
Team	GP	W	L	T	PF	PA	Pts
University of Alberta Varsity	3	2	1	0	21	20	4
Edmonton Civics	3	1	2	0	20	21	2

== League champions ==
Football Union	League Champion
IRFU	Toronto Argonauts
WCRFU	Regina Rugby Club
CIRFU	University of Toronto
ORFU	Hamilton Rowing Club
MRFU	Winnipeg Rowing Club
SRFU	Regina Rugby Club
ARFU	University of Alberta

== Grey Cup playoffs ==
Note: All dates in 1914

=== Alberta Rugby Football Union playoffs ===
ARFU Finals Games 1 & 2
Date	Away	Home
November 7	Calgary Tigers 0	University of Alberta Varsity 3
November 21	University of Alberta Varsity 17	Calgary Tigers 15

- University of Alberta Varsity wins the total-point series 20-15.

=== SRFU Playoff ===
Date	Away	Home
October 24	University of Saskatchewan Varsity 0	Regina Rugby Club 31

- Regina advances to the West Final.

=== West Final - SRFU–MRFU Inter-League Playoff ===
Date	Away	Home
October 31	Regina Rugby Club 20	Winnipeg Rowing Club 12

=== IRFU Playoff ===
Date	Away	Home
November 21	Hamilton Tigers 4	Toronto Argonauts 11

- Toronto advances to the East Final.

=== CIRFU playoff ===
Date	Away	Home
November 21	McGill Redmen 13	Toronto Varsity Blues 17

- Varsity advances to the Grey Cup.

=== East final ===
Date	Away	Home
November 28	Toronto Argonauts 16	Hamilton Rowing Club 14

- Toronto Argonauts advance to the Grey Cup.

== Playoff bracket ==
Quarterfinals
IRFU	Toronto Argonauts	11
IRFU	Hamilton Tigers	4

Semifinals
IRFU	Toronto Argonauts	16
ORFU	Hamilton Rowing Club	14
CIRFU	University of Toronto	17
CIRFU	McGill University	13

Grey Cup final
IRFU	Toronto Argonauts	14
CIRFU	University of Toronto	2

== Grey Cup Championship ==
December 5 6th Annual Grey Cup Game: Varsity Stadium - Toronto, Ontario
Toronto Argonauts 14	Toronto Varsity Blues 2
Toronto Argonauts are the 1914 Grey Cup Champions
