= 1920 in Canadian football =

After a four year absence due to the First World War, the Grey Cup was up for grabs once again as a couple of familiar foes battled for the trophy. The Toronto Varsity Blues defeated the Toronto Argonauts. It was the final time these cross-town rivals challenged each other for the Grey Cup.

== Canadian Football News in 1920 ==
CIRFU and IRFU adopted a four-yard Interference rule while the CRU opted for three yards of Interference.

ARFU played games with 12 players per side and introduced the snap-back. The reduction in the number of players was done for monetary reasons as train rates were high after World War I. The CRU would make the same changes in 1921.

The MRFU champion Winnipeg Victorias were unable to field a full team for the WCRFU finals and withdrew from competition. The MRFU wanted to substitute the second place University of Manitoba Varsity team but the SRFU refused to accept the challenge.

As champions of the WCRFU, the Regina Rugby Club issued a challenge to compete for the Grey Cup. The CRU had already established its playoff schedule and was unwilling to make any changes. At the time, the CIRFU champions had not been determined but McGill had already announced that if they won the CIRFU they would not compete in the CRU playoffs. The CRU ruled that if McGill won the CIRFU then the Regina Rugby Club would take the place of the CIRFU in the playoffs. In the end, the University of Toronto Varsity team won the CIRFU and the west had to wait one more year before it could compete for the Grey Cup.

== Regular season ==
=== Final regular season standings ===
Note: GP = Games Played, W = Wins, L = Losses, T = Ties, PF = Points For, PA = Points Against, Pts = Points

**Interprovincial Rugby Football Union**
Team	GP	W	L	T	PF	PA	Pts
**Toronto Argonauts**	6	5	1	0	54	32	10
Hamilton Tigers	6	4	2	0	48	25	8
Ottawa Rough Riders	6	3	3	0	49	52	6
Montreal AAA	6	0	6	0	35	77	0

Ontario Rugby Football Union
Team	GP	W	L	T	PF	PA	Pts
**Torontos**	4	3	1	0	60	35	6
Parkdale Rowing Club	4	1	3	0	35	60	2

**Intercollegiate Rugby Football Union**
Team	GP	W	L	T	PF	PA	Pts
**McGill Redmen**	4	3	1	0	61	22	6
**Varsity Blues**	4	3	1	0	77	21	6
Queen's University	4	0	4	0	13	106	0

*Bold text means that they have clinched the playoffs

Manitoba Rugby Football Union
Team	GP	W	L	T	PF	PA	Pts
**Winnipeg Victorias**	4	4	0	0	66	20	8
University of Manitoba Varsity	4	1	3	0	39	61	2
Winnipeg Tammany Tigers	4	1	3	0	19	43	2

Saskatchewan Rugby Football Union
Team	GP	W	L	T	PF	PA	Pts
Southern Saskatchewan
**Regina Rugby Club**	4	4	0	0	31	11	8
Regina Boat Club	4	2	2	0	49	36	4
Moose Jaw Millers	4	0	4	0	5	38	0
Northern Saskatchewan
**Saskatoon Quakers**	3	2	1	0	16	21	4
University of Saskatchewan Varsity	3	1	2	0	21	16	2

Alberta Rugby Football Union
Team	GP	W	L	T	PF	PA	Pts
Southern Alberta
**Calgary Tigers**	3	3	0	0	50	10	6
Calgary Canucks	3	0	3	0	10	50	0
Northern Alberta
**Edmonton Eskimos**	2	2	0	0	54	4	4
University of Alberta Varsity	2	0	2	0	4	54	0

== League champions ==
Football Union	League Champion
IRFU	Toronto Argonauts
WCRFU	Regina Rugby Club
CIRFU	University of Toronto
ORFU	Toronto Rowing Athletic Association
MRFU	Winnipeg Victorias
SRFU	Regina Rugby Club
ARFU	Calgary Tigers

== Grey Cup playoffs ==
Note: All dates in 1920

=== SRFU Playoff ===
Date	Away	Home
October 30	Saskatoon Quakers 0	Regina Rugby Club 35

- Regina Rugby Club wins the SRFU championship

=== ARFU playoffs ===
ARFU Playoffs Games 1 & 2
Date	Away	Home
October 23	Calgary Tigers 27	Edmonton Eskimos 15
October 30	Edmonton Eskimos 18	Calgary Tigers 8

- Calgary wins the total-point series 35–33. Calgary advances to WCRFU semifinal against Regina.

=== CIRFU final ===
Date	Away	Home
November 20	Toronto Varsity Blues 14	McGill University 6

- Varsity advances to the Grey Cup.

=== Eastern final ===
Date	Away	Home
November 20	Torontos 6	Toronto Argonauts 7

- Toronto Argonauts advance to the Grey Cup.

=== Western semifinal ===
Date	Away	Home
November 6	Calgary Tigers 1	Regina Rugby Club 28

=== Western final ===
Date	Away	Home
November 13	Winnipeg Victorias	Regina Rugby Club

* Winnipeg Victorias withdrew from the competition as several players were unable to get time off work for the trip to Regina

== Playoff bracket ==
Semifinals
CIRFU	Toronto Varsity Blues	14
CIRFU	McGill University	6
IRFU	Toronto Argonauts	7
ORFU	Toronto Torontos	6

Grey Cup final
CIRFU	Toronto Varsity Blues	16
IRFU	Toronto Argonauts	3

== Grey Cup Championship ==
December 4 8th Annual Grey Cup Game: Varsity Stadium - Toronto, Ontario
Toronto Argonauts 3	Toronto Varsity Blues 16
Toronto Varsity Blues are the 1920 Grey Cup Champions
