= 1919 in Canadian football =

== Canadian Football News in 1919 ==
Regular season play resumed following World War I.

W. A. Hewitt served as president of the Canada Rugby Union for the 1919 season.

There was no Grey Cup game. McGill University declined further play due to the lateness of the season and the approaching examinations. Montréal Winged Wheelers declined due to the arrival of cold weather and a frozen ground. Many players were businessmen, returning from World War I and were more interested in resuming their business affairs than playing football.

== Regular season ==
=== Final regular season standings ===
Note: GP = Games played, W = Wins, L = Losses, T = Ties, PF = Points for, PA = Points against, Pts = Points

**Interprovincial Rugby Football Union**
| Team | GP | W | L | T | PF | PA | Pts |
|---|---|---|---|---|---|---|---|
| Montreal AAA | 6 | 4 | 2 | 0 | 71 | 51 | 8 |
| Toronto Argonauts | 6 | 3 | 3 | 0 | 78 | 44 | 6 |
| Hamilton Tigers | 6 | 3 | 3 | 0 | 78 | 91 | 6 |
| Ottawa Rough Riders | 6 | 2 | 4 | 0 | 42 | 83 | 4 |

Ontario Rugby Football Union
| Team | GP | W | L | T | PF | PA | Pts |
|---|---|---|---|---|---|---|---|
| **Torontos** | 4 | 4 | 0 | 0 | 141 | 6 | 8 |
| Ottawa Capitals | 4 | 2 | 2 | 0 | 25 | 79 | 4 |
| Hamilton Rowing Club | 4 | 0 | 4 | 0 | 15 | 96 | 0 |

**Intercollegiate Rugby Football Union**
| Team | GP | W | L | T | PF | PA | Pts |
|---|---|---|---|---|---|---|---|
| **McGill Redmen** | 4 | 4 | 0 | 0 | 94 | 8 | 8 |
| Varsity Blues | 4 | 2 | 2 | 0 | 73 | 42 | 4 |
| Queen's University | 4 | 0 | 4 | 0 | 9 | 126 | 0 |

*Bold text indicates that they have qualified for the playoffs, but did not play.

Manitoba Rugby Football Union
| Team | GP | W | L | T | PF | PA | Pts |
|---|---|---|---|---|---|---|---|
| **Winnipeg Victorias** | 4 | 4 | 0 | 0 | 65 | 5 | 8 |
| University of Manitoba Varsity | 3 | 1 | 2 | 0 | 14 | 39 | 2 |
| Winnipeg St.John's | 3 | 0 | 3 | 0 | 1 | 36 | 0 |

*Final league game was not played

Saskatchewan Rugby Football Union
| Team | GP | W | L | T | PF | PA | Pts |
|---|---|---|---|---|---|---|---|
| Regina Rugby Club | 5 | 5 | 0 | 0 | 180 | 7 | 10 |
| Saskatoon Rugby Club | 5 | 3 | 2 | 0 | 74 | 46 | 6 |
| Moose Jaw Millers | 5 | 2 | 3 | 0 | 23 | 106 | 4 |
| University of Saskatchewan Varsity | 5 | 0 | 5 | 0 | 1 | 119 | 0 |

* Two games from the final week were cancelled

Alberta Rugby Football Union
| Team | GP | W | L | T | PF | PA | Pts |
|---|---|---|---|---|---|---|---|
| Calgary Canucks | 4 | 4 | 0 | 0 | 57 | 20 | 8 |
| University of Alberta Varsity | 3 | 1 | 2 | 0 | 26 | 37 | 2 |
| Calgary Tigers | 3 | 1 | 2 | 0 | 11 | 28 | 2 |
| Edmonton Canucks | 2 | 0 | 2 | 0 | 8 | 17 | 0 |

* Six games were cancelled due to weather; Calgary Tigers and Edmonton Canucks withdrew from league and playoffs

== League Champions ==
| Football Union | League Champion |
|---|---|
| IRFU | Montreal AAA |
| WCRFU | Regina Rugby Club |
| CIRFU | McGill University |
| ORFU | Toronto Rowing Athletic Association |
| MRFU | Winnipeg Victorias |
| SRFU | Regina Rugby Club |
| ARFU | Calgary Canucks |

== Western Playoffs ==
Note: All dates in 1919

=== SRFU–MRFU Inter-League Playoff ===
| Date | Away | Home |
|---|---|---|
| November 1 | Winnipeg Victorias 0 | Regina Rugby Club 12 |

- Regina Rugby Club advances to the WCRFU Final

=== WCRFU Final ===
| Date | Away | Home |
|---|---|---|
| November 15 | Regina Rugby Club 13 | Calgary Canucks 1 |

- Regina Rugby Club wins the WCRFU championship
