= List of Saskatchewan Roughriders seasons =

This is a complete list of seasons competed by the Saskatchewan Roughriders, a Canadian Football League team. While the team was founded in 1910 (as the Regina Rugby Club), they did not join the CFL until it was founded in 1958. Throughout their history, the Roughriders have won four Grey Cups since western teams were permitted to compete for the trophy in 1921.

Grey Cup Championships†	Western Championships*	Regular season Championships^

League Season	Team Season	League	Division	Finish	Wins	Losses	Ties	Postseason
Regina Rugby Club
1910	1910	SRFU	–	2nd	0	4	0	
1911	1911	SRFU	–	1st^	3	1	0	Won SRFU Playoff (Moose Jaw Tigers) 21–11; Defaulted West Semi-Final to (Winnipeg RC)
1912	1912	SRFU*	–	1st^	3	1	0	Won Western Final (Winnipeg RC) 5–0
1913	1913	SRFU*	–	1st^	4	0	0	Won Western Semi-Final (Eskimos) 19–7; Won Western Final (Winnipeg RC) 29–0
1914	1914	SRFU*	–	1st^	4	0	0	Won SRFU Playoff (Saskatchewan) 33–0; Won Western Final (Winnipeg RC) 20–12
1915	1915	SRFU*	–	1st^	4	0	0	Won Western Final (Canucks) 11–1
1916	1916	SRFU*	–	1st^	2	0	0	No playoffs
1917	1917	Season cancelled (World War I)						
1918	1918	Season cancelled (World War I)						
1919	1919	SRFU*	–	1st^	5	0	0	Won SRFU Playoff (Quakers) 29–0; Won Western Semi-Final (Victorias) 12–0; Won Western Final (Canucks) 13–1
1920	1920	SRFU*	–	1st^	3	0	0	Won Western Final (Tigers) 28–1
1921	1921	SRFU	–	1st^	4	0	0	Lost SRFU Playoff (Quakers) 9–6
1922	1922	SRFU	–	1st^	4	0	0	Lost Western Semi-Final (Elks) 13–8
1923	1923	SRFU*	–	1st^	3	1	0	Won Western Semi-Final (Eskimos) 9–6; Won Western Final (Victorias) 11–1; Lost Grey Cup (Queen's) 54–0
Regina Roughriders
1924	1924	SRFU	–	1st^	4	2	0	Lost Western Semi-Final (Victorias) 22–5
1925	1925	SRFU	–	1st^	No league play			Won SRFU Playoff (Quakers) 30–0; Lost Western Final (Tammany Tigers) 11–1
1926	1926	SRFU*	–	1st^	No league play			Won Western Semi-Final (St. John's) 13–5; Won Western Final (Alberta) 13–1; Season ended early, did not challenge for Grey Cup
1927	1927	SRFU*	–	1st^	3	0	0	Won Western Semi-Final (Tammany Tigers) 17–2; Won Western Final (UBC) 19–0; Manager Ronne Bohem decided not to play in the Grey Cup
1928	1928	Tri-City*	–	1st^	6	0	0	Won Western Final (St. John's) 12–1; Lost Grey Cup (Tigers) 30–0
1929	1929	SRFU*	–	1st^	3	0	1	Won Western Final (St. John's) 12–1; Won Western Final (Tigers) 15–8; Lost Grey Cup (Tigers) 14–3
1930	1930	SRFU*	–	1st^	4	0	0	Won Western Playoff (St. John's) 23–0; Won Western Semi-Final (Tigers) 9–6; Won Western Final (Meralomas) 17–0; Lost Grey Cup (Beachers) 11–6
1931	1931	SRFU*	–	1st^	4	0	0	Won Western Semi-Final (St. John's) 47–7; Won Western Final (Altomahs) 26–2; Lost Grey Cup (Winged Wheelers) 22–0
1932	1932	SRFU*	–	1st^	5	1	0	Won Western Semi-Final (St. John's) 9–1; Won Western Final (Altomahs) 10–2; Lost Grey Cup (Tigers) 25–6
1933	1933	SRFU	–	1st^	5	1	0	Lost Western Semi-Final ('Pegs) 11–1
1934	1934	SRFU*	–	1st^	6	0	0	Won Western Final (Meralomas) 8–2; Lost Grey Cup (Imperials) 20–12
1935	1935	SRFU	–	1st^	4	0	0	Lost Western Semi-Final ('Pegs) 13–6
1936	1936	SRFU	–	3rd	1	2	1	Regina "Little" Roughriders
1936	1936	WIFU*	–	2nd	3	2	1	Won W.I.F.U Playoff (Winnipegs) 1–1 series (24–14 points); Won W.C.R.F.U Finals (Bronks) 8–1; Were refused to enter Grey Cup game by the Canadian Rugby Union
1937	1937	WIFU	–	3rd	3	5	0	
1938	1938	WIFU	–	3rd	4	4	0	Lost W.I.F.U. Semi-Finals (Blue Bombers) 13–0
1939	1939	WIFU	–	2nd	6	6	0	Lost W.I.F.U. Semi-Finals (Bronks) 24–17
1940	1940	WIFU	–	3rd	2	6	0	
1941	1941	WIFU	–	2nd	5	3	0	Lost W.I.F.U. Finals (Blue Bombers)
1942	1942	Season cancelled (World War II)						
1943	1943	Season cancelled (World War II)						
1944	1944	Season cancelled (World War II)						
1945	1945	WIFU	–	No season play				Lost W.I.F.U. Semi-Finals (Stampeders) 0–2 series (15–1 points)
Saskatchewan Roughriders
1946	1946	WIFU	–	3rd	2	6	0	
1947	1947	WIFU	–	3rd	3	5	0	
1948	1948	WIFU	–	2nd	3	9	0	Lost W.I.F.U. Finals (Stampeders) 21–10
1949	1949	WIFU	–	2nd	9	5	0	Lost W.I.F.U. Finals (Stampeders) 1–1 series (22–21 points)
1950	1950	WIFU	–	2nd	7	7	0	Lost W.I.F.U. Semi-Finals (Eskimos) 24–1
1951	1951	WIFU*	–	1st^	8	6	0	Won W.I.F.U. Finals (Eskimos) 2–1 series (42–38 points); Lost Grey Cup (Rough Riders) 21–14
1952	1952	WIFU	–	4th	3	13	0	
1953	1953	WIFU	–	2nd	8	7	1	Lost W.I.F.U. Semi-Finals (Blue Bombers) 1–1 series (60–23 points)
1954	1954	WIFU	–	2nd	10	4	2	Lost W.I.F.U. Semi-Finals (Blue Bombers) 0–1–1 series (27–25 points)
1955	1955	WIFU	–	2nd	10	6	0	Lost W.I.F.U. Semi-Finals (Blue Bombers) 1–1 series (24–16 points)
1956	1956	WIFU	–	2nd	10	6	0	Won W.I.F.U. Semi-Finals (Blue Bombers) 1–1 series (50–26 points); Lost W.I.F.U. Finals (Eskimos) 1–2 series (93–42 points)
1957	1957	WIFU	–	5th	3	12	1	
1958	1958	CFL	W.I.F.U.	3rd	7	7	2	Lost W.I.F.U. Semi-Finals (Eskimos) 0–2 series (58–12 points)
1959	1959	CFL	W.I.F.U.	5th	1	15	0	
1960	1960	CFL	W.I.F.U.	5th	2	12	2	
1961	1961	CFL	West	4th	5	10	1	
1962	1962	CFL	West	3rd	8	7	1	Lost West Semi-Finals (Stampeders) 0–2 series (43–7 points)
1963	1963	CFL	West	3rd	7	7	2	Won West Semi-Finals (Stampeders) 1–1 series (48–47 points); Lost West Finals (Lions) 1–2 series (63–21 points)
1964	1964	CFL	West	3rd	9	7	0	Lost West Semi-Finals (Stampeders) 1–1 series (76–40 points)
1965	1965	CFL	West	3rd	8	7	1	Lost West Semi-Finals (Blue Bombers) 15–9
1966	1966	CFL†	West*	1st^	9	6	1	Won West Finals (Blue Bombers) 2–0 series (35–26 points); Won Grey Cup (Rough Riders) 29–14
1967	1967	CFL	West*	2nd	12	4	0	Won West Semi-Finals (Eskimos) 21–5; Won West Finals (Stampeders) 2–1 series (39–37 points); Lost Grey Cup (Tiger-Cats) 24–1
1968	1968	CFL	West	1st^	12	3	1	Lost West Finals (Stampeders) 0–2 series (57–12 points)
1969	1969	CFL	West*	1st^	13	3	0	Won West Finals (Stampeders) 2–0 series (53–24 points); Lost Grey Cup (Rough Riders) 29–11
1970	1970	CFL	West	1st^	14	2	0	Lost West Finals (Stampeders) 1–2 series (46–36 points)
1971	1971	CFL	West	2nd	9	6	1	Won West Semi-Finals (Blue Bombers) 34–23; Lost West Finals (Stampeders) 0–2 series (53–42 points)
1972	1972	CFL	West*	3rd	8	8	0	Won West Semi-Final (Eskimos) 8–6; Won West Final (Blue Bombers) 27––24; Lost Grey Cup (Tiger-Cats) 13–10
1973	1973	CFL	West	2nd	10	6	0	Won West Semi-Final (Lions) 33–13; Lost West Final (Eskimos) 25–23
1974	1974	CFL	West	2nd	9	7	0	Won West Semi-Final (Lions) 24–14; Lost West Final (Eskimos) 31–27
1975	1975	CFL	West	2nd	10	5	1	Won West Semi-Final (Blue Bombers) 42–24; Lost West Final (Eskimos) 30–18
1976	1976	CFL	West*	1st^	11	5	0	Won West Final (Eskimos) 23–13; Lost Grey Cup (Rough Riders) 23–20
1977	1977	CFL	West	4th	8	8	0	
1978	1978	CFL	West	5th	4	11	1	
1979	1979	CFL	West	5th	2	14	0	
1980	1980	CFL	West	5th	2	14	0	
1981	1981	CFL	West	4th	9	7	0	
1982	1982	CFL	West	5th	6	9	1	
1983	1983	CFL	West	5th	5	11	0	
1984	1984	CFL	West	4th	6	9	1	
1985	1985	CFL	West	4th	5	11	0	
1986	1986	CFL	West	5th	6	11	1	
1987	1987	CFL	West	4th	5	12	1	
1988	1988	CFL	West	2nd	11	7	0	Lost West Semi-Final (Lions) 42–18
1989	1989	CFL†	West*	3rd	9	9	0	Won West Semi-Final (Stampeders) 33–26; Won West Final (Eskimos) 32–21; Won Grey Cup (Tiger-Cats) 43–40
1990	1990	CFL	West	3rd	9	9	0	Lost West Semi-Final (Eskimos) 43–27
1991	1991	CFL	West	4th	6	12	0	
1992	1992	CFL	West	3rd	9	9	0	Lost West Semi-Final (Eskimos) 22–20
1993	1993	CFL	West	3rd	11	7	0	Lost West Semi-Final (Eskimos) 51–13
1994	1994	CFL	West	4th	11	7	0	Lost West Semi-Final (Stampeders) 36–3
1995	1995	CFL	North	6th	6	12	0	
1996	1996	CFL	West	4th	5	13	0	
1997	1997	CFL	West*	3rd	8	10	0	Won West Semi-Final (Stampeders) 33–30; Won West Final (Eskimos) 31–30; Lost Grey Cup (Argonauts) 47–23
1998	1998	CFL	West	4th	5	13	0	
1999	1999	CFL	West	4th	3	15	0	
2000	2000	CFL	West	4th	5	12	1	
2001	2001	CFL	West	4th	6	12	0	
2002	2002	CFL	West	4th	8	10	0	Lost East Semi-Final (Argonauts) 24–14
2003	2003	CFL	West	3rd	11	7	0	Won West Semi-Final (Blue Bombers) 37–21; Lost West Final (Eskimos) 30–23
2004	2004	CFL	West	3rd	9	9	0	Won West Semi-Final (Eskimos) 14–6; Lost West Final (Lions) 27–25 (OT)
2005	2005	CFL	West	4th	9	9	0	Lost East Semi-Final (Alouettes) 30–14
2006	2006	CFL	West	3rd	9	9	0	Won West Semi-Final (Stampeders) 30–21; Lost West Final (Lions) 45–18
2007	2007	CFL†	West*	2nd	12	6	0	Won West Semi-Final (Stampeders) 26–24; Won West Final (Lions) 26–17; Won Grey Cup (Blue Bombers) 23–19
2008	2008	CFL	West	2nd	12	6	0	Lost West Semi-Final (Lions) 33–12
2009	2009	CFL	West*	1st^	10	7	1	Won West Final (Stampeders) 27–17; Lost Grey Cup (Alouettes) 28–27
2010	2010	CFL	West*	2nd	10	8	0	Won West Semi-Final (Lions) 41–38 (OT); Won West Final (Stampeders) 20–16; Lost Grey Cup (Alouettes) 21–18
2011	2011	CFL	West	4th	5	13	0	
2012	2012	CFL	West	3rd	8	10	0	Lost West Semi-Final (Stampeders) 36–30
2013	2013	CFL†	West*	2nd	11	7	0	Won West Semi-Final (Lions) 29–25; Won West Final (Stampeders) 35–13; Won Grey Cup (Tiger-Cats) 45–23
2014	2014	CFL	West	3rd	10	8	0	Lost West Semi-Final (Eskimos) 18–10
2015	2015	CFL	West	5th	3	15	0	
2016	2016	CFL	West	5th	5	13	0	
2017	2017	CFL	West	4th	10	8	0	Won East Semi-Final (Redblacks) 31–20; Lost East Final (Argonauts) 25–21
2018	2018	CFL	West	2nd	12	6	0	Lost West Semi-Final (Blue Bombers) 23–18
2019	2019	CFL	West	1st^	13	5	0	Lost West Final (Blue Bombers) 20–13
2020	2020	CFL	West	Season cancelled due to the COVID-19 pandemic				
2021	2021	CFL	West	2nd	9	5	0	Won West Semi-Final (Stampeders) 33–30 (OT); Lost West Final (Blue Bombers) 21–17
2022	2022	CFL	West	4th	6	12	0	
2023	2023	CFL	West	4th	6	12	0	
2024	2024	CFL	West	2nd	9	8	1	Won West Semi-Final (Lions) 28–19; Lost West Final (Blue Bombers) 38–22
2025	2025	CFL†	West*	1st^	12	6	0	Won West Final (Lions) 24–21; Won Grey Cup (Alouettes) 25–17
2026	2026	CFL	West	3rd	10	8	0	Lost West Semi-Final (Lions) 33–26
Regular Season Totals (1910–2026)					645	663	24	
Playoff Totals (1910–2026)					72	66	2	
Grey Cup Totals (1921–2026)					5	15		
