= History of the Saskatchewan Roughriders =

History of the Saskatchewan Roughrider Football Club

The history of the Saskatchewan Roughriders dates to 1910 when they were founded as the Regina Rugby Club and became charter members of the Saskatchewan Rugby Football Union. The team changed their name to the Regina Roughriders in 1924 and became charter members of the Western Interprovincial Football Union in 1936. They began using their current moniker in 1946 and adopted it officially in 1950. The Roughriders became a charter member of the Canadian Football League when it was founded in 1958.

Although the Roughriders were not the first team to play football in Western Canada, the club has maintained an unbroken organizational continuity since their founding. The Roughriders are the fourth-oldest professional gridiron football team in existence today (only the Arizona Cardinals, Hamilton Tiger-Cats and Toronto Argonauts are older), and one of the oldest professional sports teams still in existence in North America. Of these teams, the Roughriders are both the oldest still in existence that continuously has been based in Western Canada (as well as the oldest surviving team in the CFL's present-day West Division) and the oldest in North America to continuously have been based west of St. Louis, Missouri. They are also the continent's oldest community-owned professional sports franchise, older than every American professional sports team outside baseball other than the aforementioned Cardinals (who, unlike the Roughriders, no longer play in their original city, and have moved twice in their history) and older than every Canadian sports team outside football except the Montreal Canadiens, who were founded about nine months prior to the Roughriders.

Regina dominated the SRFU prior to the establishment of the WIFU, winning all but two provincial league titles. Since the establishment of the WIFU, the Roughriders have finished first in their division eight times, but they have won the Western championship a record 28 times throughout their history. They have played for the Grey Cup 19 times, most recently in 2013 when they captured their fourth national championship.

The Roughriders played their home games at historic Taylor Field from 1936 to 2016; in 2017, the team moved to the newly constructed Mosaic Stadium at Evraz Place. The team has had 20 players inducted into the Canadian Football Hall of Fame.

== Club origins, Regina Rugby Club (1910–1923) ==
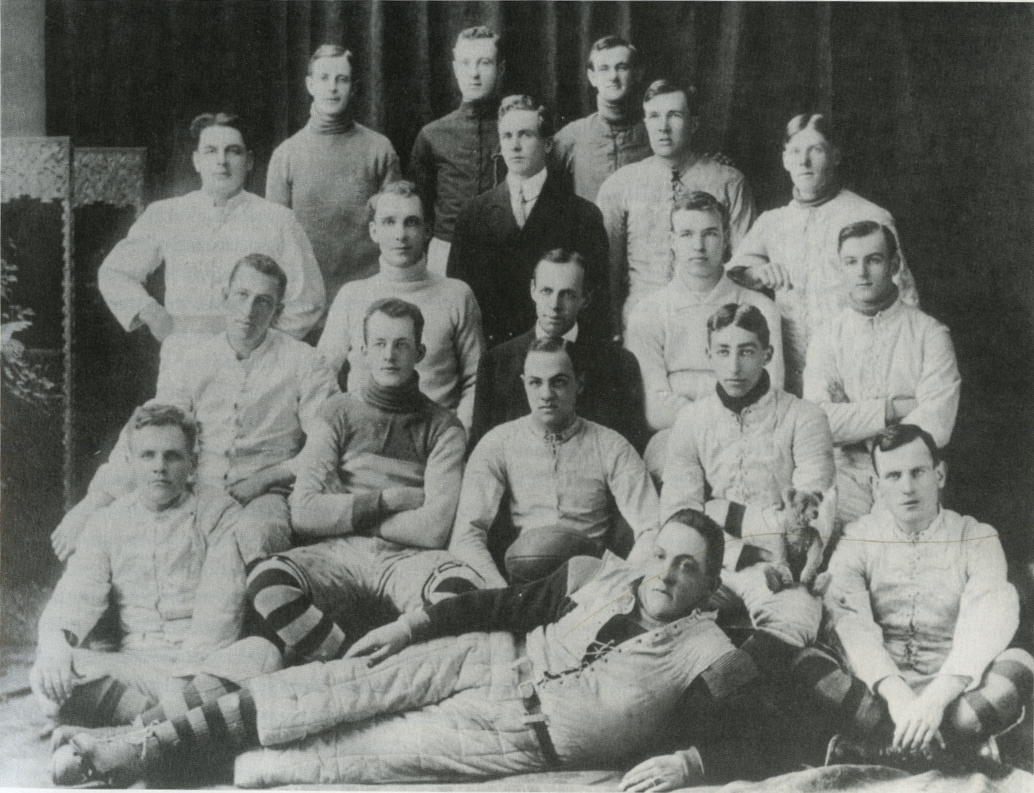
1910 Regina Rugby Club

The team was founded as the Regina Rugby Club on Tuesday, September 13, 1910, adopting the colours of old gold and purple. The team was also a founding member of the Saskatchewan Rugby Football Union as it was organized on September 22 of that year. Regina played their first game against the Moose Jaw Tigers on October 1, 1910, at the Moose Jaw Baseball Grounds where they were defeated 16–6. After going winless in their inaugural season, Regina quickly became the strongest team in the province. For the 1911 season, the team changed their colours to blue and white to match the Regina Amateur Athletic Association.

Regina went 3–1 in their second season and captured their first SRFU championship by winning a one game tiebreaker playoff against Moose Jaw. Meanwhile, the Western Canada Rugby Football Union had been formed within the three prairie provinces with the intent of creating a playoff format to determine a Western champion. Much to the displeasure of the SRFU, the Albertan and Manitoban unions had agreed to a format (ostensibly to minimize travel) in which the MRFU champion would host the Western semi-final and the ARFU champion would host the Western final. Regina balked at the prospect of playing up to two road games, and refused to participate in the inaugural WCRFU playoffs.

The Regina Rugby Club changed their colours again in 1912 to red and black. Meanwhile, the WCRFU agreed to change the playoff format so that the SRFU champion was given a bye to the Western final in exchange for the Saskatchewan champion agreeing to play the championship game on the road. Regina began an era of western football dominance. From 1912 through 1920, Regina not only won six consecutive WCRFU titles, but went undefeated in competitive play during that span. Due to World War I, no Western playoffs were held in 1916 and in 1917 and 1918 league play was halted altogether.

In 1921, the Western champion was invited to compete for the Grey Cup national championship for the first time. Regina again went undefeated in the regular season, but were required to play the Saskatoon Quakers for the provincial championship as travel difficulties had prevented Saskatoon from playing the other southern teams. Regina defeated Saskatoon, but the result was overturned after a successful protest concerning an early touchdown which had provided the decisive points. The Quakers won the rematch to mark the only time other than their inaugural season that the Regina Rugby Club did not win the SRFU championship while it was their primary competition. Ultimately, the Edmonton Eskimos traveled east to play in the 9th Grey Cup.

The team's rise to early prominence came even as it led a somewhat nomadic existence. It originally played at Dominion Park, but after the war was forced to move to the city exhibition grounds after the city sold Dominion Park. In 1921, it moved to Park Hughes on 10th Avenue in the North Central section of Regina, a rugby and soccer field built in 1910. It was the first season at an address that remained associated with the club for parts of the next nine decades.

In 1923, Regina returned to power as they won their eighth western championship over the Winnipeg Victorias and earned the right to compete in the national playoffs. The club was given a bye and advanced straight to the Grey Cup finals for the first time, but were severely outmatched, losing 54–0 to Queen's University at Varsity Stadium in Toronto. This was, and still is, the most lopsided defeat in Grey Cup history as the defending champion Queen's won their third straight national championship at the expense of the Regina Rugby Club.

== Regina Roughriders (1924–1945) ==
Following their first Grey Cup loss, the club changed their name to the Regina Roughriders in 1924 while retaining the colours of red and black. Ottawa also had a team called the Ottawa Rough Riders, but the spelling was different and the two clubs played in different leagues then (incidentally, however, both clubs shared the same colours of red and black then). The origin of the name has multiple theories, the most credible of which describes how the North-West Mounted Police were called Roughriders because they broke the wild horse broncos that were used by the force and the moniker was adopted from them. Giving credence to this theory is that during this time, the team occasionally played at the RNWMP/RCMP barracks when the then-rudimentary facilities at Park Hughes were rendered unsuitable for play by inclement weather. For a long time, the playing surface at Park Hughes was little more than dirt, and heavy rain often turned the field to a muddy bog.

An alternative, discredited story states that the name was adopted from Theodore Roosevelt's cavalry contingent that was known as the Rough Riders, who fought in the Spanish–American War. It was believed that there were Canadian troops in the contingent who returned to Canada following the war. However, this story is more often associated with the Ottawa club. While it has been suggested that some of the troops may have eventually moved out west, the Roughriders did not adopt their name until 1924, by which time the Spanish–American War was (especially in Canada) barely a historical footnote compared to the then-much more recent (and much more climactic) First World War. Following World War I, any attempt to deliberately name a Canadian sports team in honour of a unit that participated in an earlier American war would have been extremely unpopular.

During the first two years after their name change, the Roughriders failed to reclaim their western championship title, losing both times to clubs from Winnipeg. The 1926 season marked the beginning of their next reign of dominance as the club matched their own WCRFU record with seven consecutive western championships from 1926 to 1932. With dominant players such as Canadian Football Hall of Famer Eddie James, the Roughriders were a perennial contender from the West, reaching the Grey Cup finals five consecutive years from 1928 to 1932, the second-longest streak in the championship's history (the team did not challenge for the Cup in 1926 or 1927). Unfortunately, Regina remained winless in the national championship, being outscored 102–15 in those five Grey Cup games. The Roughriders won their last WCRFU title in 1934, representing the west for the seventh time in the 22nd Grey Cup, but lost to the Sarnia Imperials in that club's first Grey Cup win.

In 1928, Park Hughes was combined with Park de Young, a neighbouring baseball field, to create a much larger football venue. However, from 1929 to 1935, the Roughriders played most of their games at the larger exhibition grounds.

== Western Interprovincial Football Union (1936–1958) ==
In 1936, Regina joined the Winnipeg Blue Bombers and Calgary Bronks as the founding franchises of the Western Interprovincial Football Union, the highest level of Canadian football play in Western Canada. Also in 1936, the first permanent grandstand was built at Park Hughes and Park de Young. The Riders moved to the facility full-time that season. The stadium, renamed Taylor Field in 1946, was the Riders' home for over eight decades. The Roughriders became the first WIFU champions after they defeated the Blue Bombers and Bronks in the West Semi-finals and West Finals respectively. However, due to a rules dispute with the Canadian Rugby Union over use of their five import players from the United States, Regina was barred from competing for the 24th Grey Cup. Winnipeg had won the Grey Cup championship one year earlier with seven imports and the move to prevent Regina from competing was seen as a reaction to the previous year's western win. While the Roughriders had planned on traveling east without the five ineligible players, the CRU remained steadfast in their decision to disallow the team from competition.

The next decade in the WIFU was not as successful as the first as the team did not win another Western Final as the Regina Roughriders, nor ever finish in first place in that time span. After qualifying for the playoffs in three of their next five seasons, play from 1942 to 1944 was interrupted by World War II. While there was no regular season in 1945, the Roughriders did play the newly named Calgary Stampeders in the West Semi-finals, but lost the series two games to none.

With the folding of both clubs in Moose Jaw and Saskatoon, the Regina Roughriders became a provincially community-owned club (and has remained so since), and, consequently, changed their name to the Saskatchewan Roughriders in 1946. It is the first recorded instance of a major-league team in North America branding itself as a statewide or provincewide team. Prior to the 1948 season, the Roughriders were in need of new uniforms as their red and black ones had become old and worn out. While visiting a surplus store in Chicago, executive member Jack Fyfe found a set of green and white uniforms and purchased them for the Roughriders. Green and white have remained as the team's primary colours to this day (although the team has also worn silver and black as accent colours since then at times). The name change was made official on April 1, 1950.

After three years of first-round playoff exits, the Roughriders finally returned to prominence in 1951, winning their first WIFU regular season championship with an 8–6 record. Saskatchewan, led by quarterback Glenn Dobbs, defeated the Edmonton Eskimos in the West Final and advanced to the Grey Cup for the first time since 1934. In this game, they faced the Ottawa Rough Riders for the first time, marking the first Roughriders versus Rough Riders championship game in Canadian football history. Unfortunately, Saskatchewan still did not win their first championship, as they were defeated by Ottawa 21–14 in the 39th Grey Cup.

Saskatchewan contended on and off in the 1950s, with four consecutive winning seasons and second-place regular season finishes from 1953 to 1956. Teams from this era featured standouts such as Frank Tripucka, Reggie Whitehouse, Ken Carpenter, Mike Cassidy, player-coach Frank Filchock and Cookie Gilchrist who was the first Roughrider player to rush for 1,000 yards in 1958. Even with that talent, they could not return to the Grey Cup as clubs fielded by either the Edmonton Eskimos and Winnipeg Blue Bombers ended their season in each of these years. Their strongest season was in 1956 when the Roughriders achieved a 10–6 record and won their first playoff series since 1951, only to lose to the Eskimos in the Western Finals.

Following their 1956 campaign, tragedy struck the Roughriders franchise when four members of the team were killed in a plane crash on December 9, 1956, while returning from the Canadian Football Council (CFC) All Star Game in Vancouver. Gordon Sturtridge, Mel Becket, Ray Syrnyk, and Mario DeMarco were killed when Flight 810 crashed into Slesse Mountain near Chilliwack, British Columbia. The team retired the numbers of the four players shortly after the tragedy. The following season, the Roughriders finished with seven fewer wins and a last place finish in the WIFU.

== Ken Preston Era (1958–1978) ==
1958 brought not only change, as the Saskatchewan Roughriders became charter members of the newly formed Canadian Football League in 1958, but also stability with Ken Preston becoming the general manager—a position he held for the next 20 years, arguably the most successful tenure in Roughrider history as the team only missed the playoffs five times, went to five Grey Cup final games, winning one in 1966. In the Roughriders' first season in the newly formed Canadian Football League, the team finished with a respectable 7–7–2 record and a third-place finish. However, the following season proved to be the worst in franchise history, as the team finished with just one win and 15 losses under head coach Frank Tripucka, the third-worst winning percentage in CFL history. The following years featured similar results, with various head coaches, as the Roughriders missed the playoffs for three consecutive seasons, their worst such streak since joining the WIFU in 1936.

== Ronnie and George show (1963–1975) ==
Following a 1962 season that saw the Roughriders return to the playoffs, the team made roster moves that defined a generation of football in Saskatchewan. In the off-season, the Roughriders signed fullback George Reed from Washington State to replace Fred Burket, who had been traded to the Alouettes. Then, prior to their season opening game of the 1963 season, general manager Ken Preston acquired Ottawa Rough Riders quarterback and defensive back Ron Lancaster on July 30 on a straight cash basis following three years with the Eastern Riders. The duo contributed to a productive season for Saskatchewan as they finished with a 7–7–2 record and won a playoff series for the first time since 1956 before losing their first playoff match-up with the BC Lions. The Roughriders continued to make progress in the next two seasons, posting back-to-back winning records, but lost in the West Semi-finals in both years.

== Eagle Keys Era (1965–1970) ==
=== 1966 Grey Cup champions ===
In 1965 after one year as the offensive coordinator, Eagle Keys became the head coach of the Roughriders and guided them to an 8–7–1 record and an appearance in the western semi-final which they lost to the Winnipeg Blue Bombers 15–9. Fullback George Reed finished the season with over 1,700 yards rushing. Before the 1966 season began, the team added the final pieces to the roster by signing defensive tackle Ed McQuarters who was a recent cut by the St. Louis Cardinals, safety and backup quarterback Bruce Bennett, defensive end Don Gerhardt and running back Paul Dudley from the Stampeders. During the 1966 season the Roughriders finally captured the Western Conference regular season title with a 9–6–1 record. This was the first time they had accomplished that feat since 1951. Ron Lancaster won the Jeff Nicklin Memorial Trophy as the Western Conference's most outstanding player while George Reed, receiver Hugh Campbell and four other Riders were named league all-stars, the most from any team that year. Saskatchewan swept Winnipeg in the West Finals, winning two games to no losses, and qualified for the ninth Grey Cup final in franchise history. In the 54th Grey Cup, Saskatchewan once again faced the Ottawa Rough Riders in a rematch of the 1951 championship game. After the score was tied 14–14 at halftime, Saskatchewan scored 15 fourth-quarter points to win the franchise's first Grey Cup championship 29–14 on November 26, 1966. Saskatchewan was the last of the original nine CFL franchises to win the Grey Cup, doing so in Vancouver at Empire Stadium. George Reed was the MVP with 31 rushes for 133 yards and one rushing touchdown.

=== Late 1960s ===
The Roughriders began the 1967 season as defending champions for the first time in franchise history. They finished in second place in the West with a franchise-best 12–4 record and advanced to Grey Cup final once again, but lost to the Hamilton Tiger-Cats 24–1. The 1968 season saw the Roughriders finish with the best record in the league at 12–3–1, although they placed 1st in the west division they lost the western final series to the Calgary Stampeders 2–0 by a combined score of 57–12. Besides the 1st-place finish another highlight of the season was coach Eagles Keys winning the Annis Stukus Trophy awarded to the coach of the year. The Roughriders finished in first place in 1969 and defeated the Stampeders to qualify for another Grey Cup. In the rubber match against the Ottawa Rough Riders, Saskatchewan fell 29–11 in their third Grey Cup game in four years. The Roughriders won a franchise-best 14 games in 1970, a record that stands to this day, but were upset in the West Finals by the Stampeders. Eagle Keys resigned during the following off-season, ending his career as the all-time leader in wins by a Saskatchewan Roughrider head coach with 68 wins and four first-place finishes.

== John Payne era (1973–1976) ==
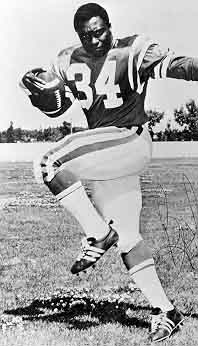
George Reed is the club's all-time leading rusher.

Dave Skrien was hired as the next head coach of the Roughriders and led them as they continued their winning ways, namely with an appearance in the 1972 Grey Cup, which yielded another Saskatchewan loss to Hamilton. For the 1973 season the Roughriders hired head coach John Payne. The Riders then had three consecutive second-place finishes and West Final losses to the Edmonton Eskimos, ending when George Reed retired after the 1975 season as the all-time leading rusher in all of professional football with 16,116 rushing yards. In 1976, the Roughriders recaptured first place in the Western Conference and defeated the Eskimos in the West Final, advancing to the Grey Cup to once again play the Ottawa Rough Riders. The Roughriders allowed a last-minute touchdown catch by Ottawa tight end Tony Gabriel to lose their fourth Grey Cup in ten years, ending one of the most bittersweet eras in Roughrider history. Saskatchewan had qualified for the playoffs for 15 consecutive seasons, tied for fourth-best in CFL history, and played in 11 consecutive Division Finals, which is a CFL record. While they also posted the best regular season record in all of professional football over that time period, the team only won one championship during that time.

== Post-Ron Lancaster era (1979–1986) ==
After their loss in the 1976 Grey Cup game to the Ottawa Rough Riders, coach John Payne left the team to become head coach of the Detroit Lions and Saskatchewan fell into a drought that was unheard of in the CFL. They posted an 8–8 record in 1977, but finished in fourth place. It was the start of an 11-year playoff drought, the longest in CFL history. The Roughriders had several talented players during this era, including Joey Walters at receiver, Vince Goldsmith at defensive end, offensive lineman Roger Aldag from Gull Lake and Dave Ridgway, who became one of the greatest kickers in CFL history. However, in an era where the West was dominated by Edmonton, Winnipeg and (by the early 1980s) the B.C. Lions, the Roughriders often found themselves in a losing battle for the third and final playoff spot in the West.

Franchise quarterback Ron Lancaster retired after the 1978 season as the CFL's all time passing leader in passing yards, completions and touchdown passes. Furthermore, he is the only Roughrider to win the CFL's Most Outstanding Player Award twice while playing with Saskatchewan. Playing without Lancaster behind centre for the first time in 16 seasons proved difficult as the team posted back-to-back 2–14 seasons in 1979 and 1980. Ironically, the head coach of those squads was none other than Lancaster himself. The Riders' only winning record during this time came in 1981 when they finished with a 9–7 record under Joe Faragalli, but it was only good enough for fourth place in a competitive West Division – the "crossover rule" had not yet been implemented – therefore, as in 1977, the Riders were denied a playoff spot despite the third place Eastern team having a worse record (the Montreal Alouettes finished 3–13). During the following six seasons, the Roughriders never earned more than six wins in a season, leaving them soundly out of the playoff picture. In 1985, the Roughriders introduced a new logo as part of the 75th anniversary of the inception of the team, adding black and silver to the team's colour scheme.

== Kent Austin era (1987–1993) ==
Before the 1987 season started, after almost a decade out of the playoffs and poor attendance saddling the team, the Roughriders felt it was necessary to conduct a telethon to keep the team afloat; Roughriders management privately knew the Montreal Alouettes were almost certainly going to fold before the season got underway (Montreal would not return for nearly a decade), and the Riders were determined not to let the same fate befall them. The province-wide "Save the Roughriders" telethon was a success in that the team sold enough tickets to keep the team in operation. Also in 1986, team executive Tom Shepherd founded the group "Friends of the Riders" to run an annual Touchdown Lottery to further bolster the club's finances. Originally conceived as a one-time fundraiser, it raised almost $22.6 million during its run and operated for 33 years. By the time the lottery was discontinued with Shepherd's retirement in 2019, the club's financial situation had long been stabilized.

After a carousel of head coaches since John Payne's departure in 1977, the Roughriders hired John Gregory after the 1986 season. Gregory took over a team that had missed the playoffs for ten consecutive seasons. In Gregory's first season as Saskatchewan's head coach, the Roughriders finished 5–12. Gregory then led the Riders to an 11–7 record in 1988 and a playoff berth. He won the Annis Stukus Trophy as the league's coach of the year. The 2nd-place finish in 1988 finally ended the franchise's 11-year playoff drought, the longest in CFL history. However, the Roughriders had to settle for second place because the Eskimos who had an identical record swept them in the regular season. On November 13, 1988, the Roughriders hosted a playoff game for the first time since 1976, but lost to the BC Lions in the Western Semi-final by a score of 42–18. Nonetheless, it was a step in the right direction as the Roughriders learned how to win and gained valuable playoff experience that they would need for next season.

=== 1989 Grey Cup champions ===
The Roughriders finished with a 9–9 record and a third-place finish in the 1989 season, but still qualified for the playoffs for a second consecutive season. They defeated the Calgary Stampeders 33–26 in the West Semi-finals in part because of delay run play to Brian Walling who ran 50 yards for a touchdown to make it 30–26 with 1:38 left to play. Ironically Walling had just been picked up by the Roughriders just weeks previously from the Edmonton Eskimos practice roster. In the West Final, Saskatchewan faced the powerhouse Edmonton Eskimos, a team that set (and still holds) a CFL record with 16 regular season wins in one season since the institution of the 18-game CFL schedule in 1986. The Roughriders defeated the heavily favoured Eskimos 32–21 to advance to the Grey Cup where they faced the Hamilton Tiger-Cats for the third time in franchise history. With a talented roster that included Kent Austin at quarterback, receivers Ray Elgaard, Donald Narcisse, Jeff Fairholm and James "Duke" Ellingson, and an outstanding offensive line featuring Roger Aldag, Vic Stevenson, Dan Payne and Bob Poley, the Roughriders found themselves in a game that featured extensive offensive prowess. With the score tied 40–40, placekicker Dave Ridgway kicked a 35-yard game-winning field goal to win the 77th Grey Cup for the Roughriders, with a play that has become simply known as "The Kick." It was the second championship for the franchise, following a 23-year drought and is considered the greatest Grey Cup game ever played.

=== Early 1990s ===
Saskatchewan qualified for the playoffs in four of the next five seasons, including two seasons with winning records, but lost in the West Semi-final each time to either of the two Alberta teams, the Calgary Stampeders or Edmonton Eskimos.

== Struggles and challenges (1994–1999) ==
In 1995, Regina hosted the Grey Cup for the first time in league history, giving the Roughriders an opportunity to compete for the championship at home. Unfortunately, the Roughriders finished in sixth place in the newly named North Division, as part of the CFL's American expansion, and did not qualify for the playoffs.

With most CFL teams losing money after the ill-fated American expansion ended after the 1995 season, the Roughriders conducted another "Save the Roughriders" telethon in 1997 to help the team's financial health (they remain the only team who required a telethon to survive), just as they did a decade earlier; the telethon, alongside a $3 million interest-free loan from the NFL to the CFL and the then-ongoing Touchdown Lottery kept the franchise afloat again. The Roughriders qualified again for the playoffs that same year for the first time since 1994, when they did so with a losing record, which was a first for the team since 1948. The team made the most of their opportunity as they defeated both of the Alberta-based teams, the Stampeders and Eskimos in the West Semi-final and West Final, respectively, to advance to the 85th Grey Cup. Unfortunately, the upstart Roughriders fell to the Doug Flutie-led Toronto Argonauts 47–23 in the first ever Grey Cup match-up between the two oldest franchises in the league. The Roughriders closed out the 20th century with two more losing seasons, failing to qualify for the playoffs in both 1998 and 1999.

== Roy Shivers and Danny Barrett era (1999–2006) ==
Following the 1999 season, Roy Shivers, the former Director of Player Personnel for the Calgary Stampeders, assumed the duties of general manager of the Roughriders. Shivers then hired Danny Barrett as the team's head coach despite the latter's limited coaching experience. The Roughriders made football history by being the first professional team with both a black general manager and head coach.

In what was described as a rebuilding process, the Roughriders began the Shivers and Barrett era with two consecutive last place finishes in 2000 and 2001, missing the playoffs in both years. In 2002, progress was being made as Saskatchewan made the playoffs for the first time since their 1997 Grey Cup run with an 8–10 record and a fourth-place finish. The team played in the East Semi-final due to the crossover rule instituted in 1997, playing in the eastern playoffs for the first time in their 90-year history, losing to their last playoff opponent, the Toronto Argonauts. The 2003 season saw the Roughriders earn their first winning record since 1994, finishing 11–7 and in third place, building optimism in a year where the franchise was hosting their second ever Grey Cup game. While the team played their longtime rival, the Winnipeg Blue Bombers, in the playoffs for the first time since 1975 and won, they lost the West Final to the eventual champion Edmonton Eskimos, missing a close chance to play in the Grey Cup at home.

After their strong 2003 campaign, the Roughriders were expected to build upon that success in 2004. While the team regressed slightly with a 9–9 record, they won the West Semi-final over the Eskimos and advanced to the West Final for the second consecutive year to face the BC Lions. After Saskatchewan scored a late touchdown to take the lead, BC tied the game with a late field goal, sending the game to overtime. Saskatchewan placekicker Paul McCallum missed an 18-yard field goal while BC kicker Duncan O'Mahoney hit a 40-yarder to win the game for the Lions, adding to the frustration of the Roughrider fanbase.

Prior to the 2005 season, quarterback Henry Burris signed as a free agent with Calgary, leaving the Roughriders with a smaller chance at progress. The team finished in fourth place with a 9–9 record and crossed over to the Eastern playoffs again, only to be defeated by the Montreal Alouettes in the first ever post-season meeting with that team. Feeling a greater need for progress, the pressure was on the Roughriders to perform in 2006 season. After Saskatchewan started the season with a 4–5 record, general manager Roy Shivers was fired on August 21, 2006. The Roughriders then hired Eric Tillman to take over and he elected not to renew Danny Barrett's contract at the end of the season, following a third consecutive 9–9 season and a West Final loss to the Lions. While they did not win any championships, Shivers and Barrett restored a measure of respectability to the franchise and set the stage for things to come.

== Ken Miller and Darian Durant era (2007–2011) ==
=== 2007 Grey Cup champions ===
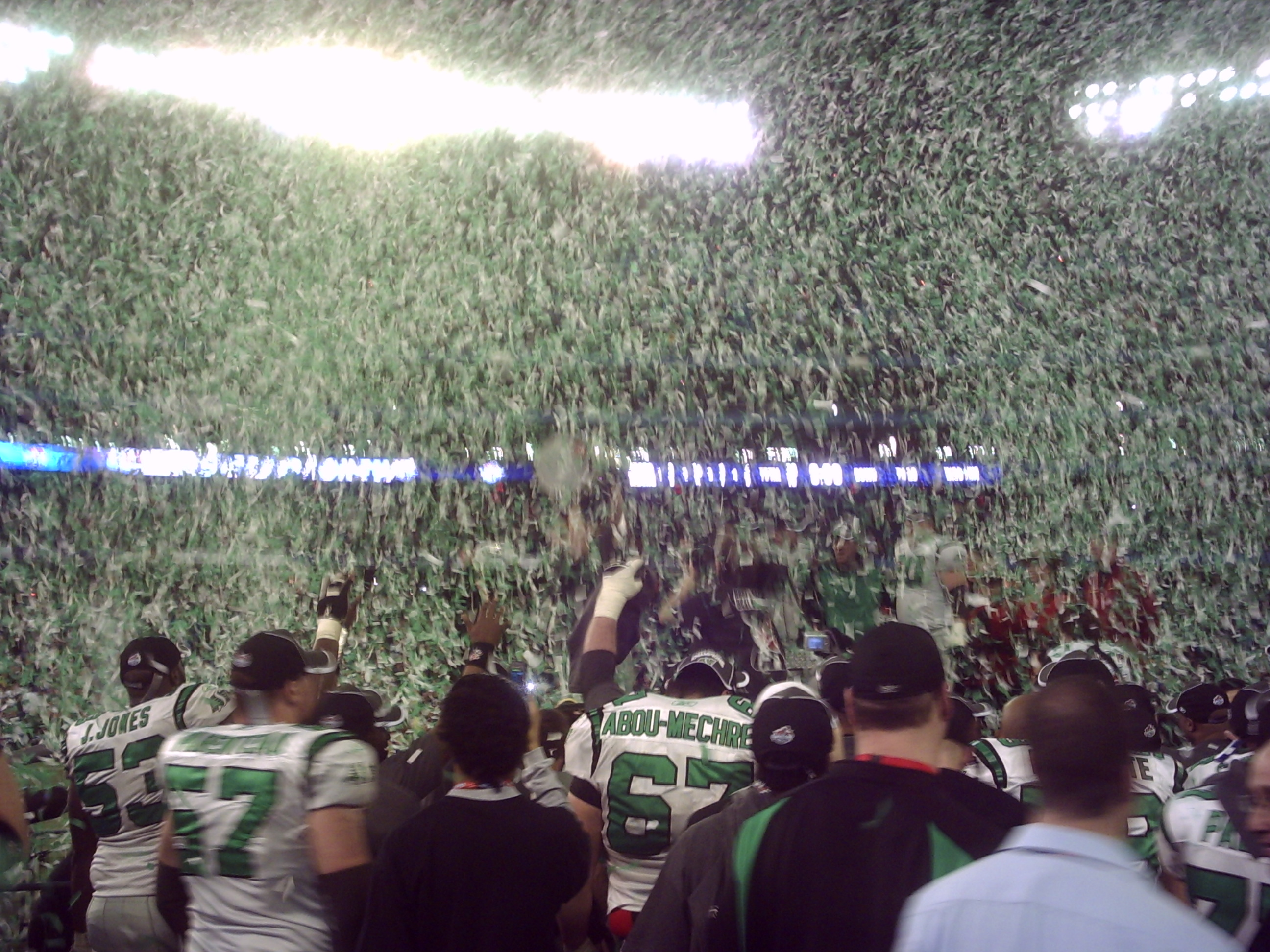
The Roughriders celebrate their 2007 Grey Cup victory

After contending on and off in the early part of the 21st century, the Roughriders hired 1989 Grey Cup hero Kent Austin as head coach and Ken Miller as offensive coordinator in the 2007 season. Despite a rookie head coach, the team jumped out to a 7–2 start, which was their best start since 1976. They finished the season with a 12–6 record and brought along with it the Roughriders' first home playoff game since 1988, which became a 26–24 victory over the Calgary Stampeders. This was also their first home playoff win since 1976. The team then followed up with a 26–17 win at BC Place over the BC Lions in the West Division final to give the Roughriders a berth in their first Grey Cup final since 1997.

On November 25, 2007, the Riders played the Winnipeg Blue Bombers in the 95th Grey Cup. The Riders' traditional rivals had moved to the East Division the previous year following the demise of the Ottawa Renegades, and the 2007 championship game marked the first time that the two Labour Day Classic opponents played each other in a Grey Cup game. Saskatchewan won 23–19 in a game where James Johnson recorded a Grey Cup record three interceptions en route to being named Most Valuable Player of the 2007 Grey Cup. Fellow Roughrider Andy Fantuz was named the Canadian MVP in the game after recording 70 yards receiving and the game-winning touchdown.

=== Late 2000s ===
A month and a half after capturing the 2007 Grey Cup, Austin stepped down as head coach to become the offensive co-ordinator at his alma mater University of Mississippi. In accepting this position in the NCAA, Austin turned down a very lucrative contract that the Riders had offered. On February 6, 2008, Roughriders GM Eric Tillman announced that the new head coach would be Ken Miller. Miller was formerly the offensive coordinator under Austin. The team also traded former league MVP Kerry Joseph to the Toronto Argonauts, leaving the team without their Grey Cup-winning head coach and starting quarterback.

The 2008 season began with a 6–0 record with wins shared between three quarterbacks, including the season opening starter, Marcus Crandell. This was the team's best record since 1934, when they were still known as the Regina Roughriders. On August 24, 2008, the team's general manager, Eric Tillman, announced the acquisition of Quarterback Michael Bishop, the Toronto Argonauts backup quarterback at the time of the trade, who went 11–1 as a starter for the Argonauts in 2007. This was the end of Marcus Crandell's run with the Roughriders, as he was released four days later. After the 6–0 start, the Riders went on to finish the 2008 CFL Regular season with the same record they finished with in 2007, at 12–6. The Roughriders finished in second place in the CFL West Division and earned the right to host the CFL West Division Semi-final for the second consecutive year. The Roughriders suffered a devastating 33–12 loss to the BC Lions in the western semi-final game, leading to Bishop's release shortly after the loss.

In 2009, the Roughriders were led by quarterback Darian Durant, who had seen his first significant playing time in 2008 and was named the opening day starter. Durant started all 18 games for Saskatchewan and led the team to a 10–7–1 record and their first West Division regular season title since 1976. After defeating the Calgary Stampeders in the West Final, the team advanced to the 97th Grey Cup to face the Montreal Alouettes. After the Roughriders were leading 27–11 in the fourth quarter, Montreal stormed back to make the score 27–25 late in the fourth. Montreal kicker Damon Duval attempted a 43-yard field goal and missed, but Saskatchewan had been called for a too-many-men penalty, advancing the placement 10 yards. Duval did not miss a second time, scoring the three points to win the game 28–27 for the Alouettes and adding to the Roughriders' championship woes.

The Roughriders celebrated their 100-year anniversary as a football club during the 2010 season, wearing retro-themed red and black uniforms based on the ones worn by the Regina Roughriders. The Roughriders finished second in the West with a 10–8 record and defeated the BC Lions in double overtime in the West Division Semi-final. After defeating the Stampeders in the West Final for the second year in a row, the Roughriders faced the Alouettes in the 98th Grey Cup once again. Despite leading 11–8 at the half, the Roughriders faced a ten-point deficit in the fourth quarter. The lead proved insurmountable, as Saskatchewan lost the game to Montreal for the second consecutive year by a score 21–18.

Following the Grey Cup loss, head coach Ken Miller resigned and became Vice President of Football operations. The club hired Greg Marshall as his replacement, but the 2011 season was one to forget, as the Roughriders finished last in the West with a 5–13 record and missed the playoffs. The Roughriders fired Marshall after a 1–7 start and had Miller step in as his replacement. The season was plagued by errors and mishaps, most of them self-inflicted as the team could not dig itself out of their early season hole. 2011 proved to be Ken Miller's last season with the Roughriders, as he retired shortly after the 2011 season.

== Corey Chamblin era (2012–2015) ==
On December 16, 2011 Corey Chamblin, who had been the defensive coordinator for the Hamilton Tiger-Cats, was named the new head coach of the Roughriders. The Roughriders signed two of the top Canadian players available in free agency in non-import offensive linemen Brendon LaBatte and Dominic Picard. However, they were not so fortunate with all-star linebacker Jerrell Freeman, who led the league in tackles in 2011 and departed for the NFL. The Roughriders also lost outstanding Canadian slotback Andy Fantuz, who led the league in receiving yards in 2010, as he signed as a free agent with Hamilton. Nonetheless, the team qualified for the playoffs after missing out during the previous season. In 2012, Saskatchewan lost the Western Division Semi-final game to the Calgary Stampeders in a close game, 36–30.

=== 2013 Grey Cup champions ===
On January 24, 2013, the Riders traded Justin Harper and a 4th round 2014 pick to the BC Lions for six-time all-star Geroy Simon. Simon holds the record for most career receiving yards. Simon played for the Lions from 2001 to 2012. The 2013 season started off spectacularly for the Roughriders, mainly for Darian Durant and Kory Sheets. The Roughriders went 8–1 in the first nine games and set a record for the best start in franchise history (their previous best was 7–1 during the 1970 season). Running back Kory Sheets had the best start for a running back in CFL history and Darian Durant had thrown only one interception while throwing 21 touchdowns.

The 2013 season ended with an 11–7 record, for 2nd in the West Division, behind Calgary. The team hosted its first playoff game since 2010 on November 10, the West Semi-finals against the BC Lions. The Roughriders won the game, 29–25, the first playoff win of Corey Chamblin's CFL head coaching career and the first since 2010 for the Roughriders, when quarterback Darian Durant put the team on his shoulders and rushed for 41 yards. On Sunday, November 17, 2013, the Roughriders successfully defeated the Calgary Stampeders in the Western Finals, the score being 35–13. This allowed the Saskatchewan Roughriders to advance to the 101st Grey Cup. It was the first time in Saskatchewan Roughriders history that they were part of the Grey Cup in their own hometown. In defiance of the individual player introduction format the league had planned for the Grey Cup game, the Roughriders took to the field as a team as the Saskatchewan crowd chanted "bring 'em out," their usual home game entrance song. The Roughriders defeated the Hamilton Tiger-Cats, 45–23, with RB Kory Sheets winning the Grey Cup Most Valuable Player Award after rushing for a franchise and Grey Cup record 197 yards, to be the third consecutive team to win the championship at their home field. The following offseason was a difficult one for the Roughriders, as they lost top players Kory Sheets and Weston Dressler to the NFL and key leaders Mike McCullough, Renauld Williams and Geroy Simon to retirement. The expansion draft saw them give up Canadian players in Keith Shologan and Zach Evans.

=== Mid-2010s ===
In February 2014, the Roughriders traded backup quarterback Drew Willy to the Winnipeg Blue Bombers. The Roughriders gave head coach Corey Chamblin an extension through 2017 after Chamblin won Coach of The Year in the CFL. 2014 training camp found starters in Anthony Allen and Brett Swain as the Roughriders went out to attempt the first repeat championship season in franchise history. They began the 2014 season with a record of 9–3, similar to that of the 2013 season start. The Roughriders defensive line led by John Chick, Ricky Foley and Terrious George led the league in sacks throughout the season, and Brian Peters led a defence poised to make a run at another championship. On September 7, 2014, Darian Durant sustained an elbow injury during the Banjo Bowl that required surgery, ultimately ending his 2014 campaign. The Roughriders then gave backup Tino Sunseri a shot at starting quarterback. With Tino Sunseri leading the team, the Roughriders went 1–4 and Seth Doege got a shot as well. The Roughriders then brought 2007 Most Outstanding Player Kerry Joseph out of retirement to help the struggling team. Joseph, alongside new running back Jerome Messam and receiver Korey Williams won one game before losing to the Edmonton Eskimos in the Western Semi-final.

The 2015 offseason saw the Roughriders lose top defensive players in Brian Peters and Ricky Foley. Peters was signed by the Minnesota Vikings of the NFL and Foley was traded to Toronto for Canadian linebacker Shea Emry on January 24, 2015. Soon after, Weston Dressler was signed to a 4-year contract with the Roughriders and Tyron Brackenridge also signed a contract to stay in Saskatchewan. Free agency saw the Roughriders bring back Kevin Glenn as their backup quarterback. They also brought back veterans Alex Hall, Keenan MacDougall and Jamel Richardson. The 2015 CFL Draft saw them pick receiver Nic Demski from the University of Manitoba Bisons. To begin the year, the Roughriders found a linebacker, Jeff Knox Jr, in training camp and he became an immediate starter next to Shea Emry and Weldon Brown. The first game of the 2015 season was devastating, with the Roughriders losing quarterback Darian Durant once again to a season-ending injury, along with injuries to Shea Emry and Keenan MacDougall early in the season. This led to players such as Jake Doughty getting a starting gig with the team.

With the injury to Durant, Kevin Glenn became the starting quarterback, fulfilling the purpose for which he was signed by Saskatchewan. Days later, Chris Milo was released by the Roughriders, and they brought in veteran Paul McCallum as starting kicker. McCallum first game back with the Green and White was on July 5, 2015, a 42–40 overtime loss to the Toronto Argonauts. Weeks later, the Roughriders still did not have a win in the 2015 season, raising concern on whether head coach Corey Chamblin would eventually be fired. The injury bug around Saskatchewan got worse as quarterback Kevin Glenn, receiver Chris Getzlaf, linebacker Weldon Brown, and receiver Taj Smith were lost to injury. This eventually led to rookie quarterback Brett Smith getting a shot as the starter. During the August 30, 2015 game against the Ottawa Redblacks, head coach Corey Chamblin made the decision to bench Smith in favour of Tino Sunseri following an interception, which disgusted many Roughrider fans. Following another disappointing loss to Ottawa and a record of 0–9 for the first half of the season, head coach Corey Chamblin and general manager Brendan Taman were fired on September 1, 2015. Special teams coordinator Bob Dyce was appointed interim head coach and assistant general manager Jeremy O'Day was appointed interim general manager.

== Chris Jones era (2016–2018) ==
On December 7, 2015, a mere week after winning the 103rd Grey Cup with the Edmonton Eskimos as their head coach, it was announced that Chris Jones would be the new head coach, general manager and vice-president of football operations for the Saskatchewan Roughriders. Jones has won four Grey Cups rings with four teams: Montreal 2002, Calgary 2008, Toronto 2012, Edmonton 2015. On December 16, 2015, eight assistant coaches under Jones in Edmonton joined the Roughrider coaching staff. This is includes Stephen McAdoo as Offensive co-ordinator and assistant head coach, Craig Dickenson as Special teams co-ordinator, Jarious Jackson as Quarterbacks coach and passing game co-ordinator, Mike Scheper as Offensive line coach, Phillip Lolley as Linebackers coach, Jason Shivers as Defensive backs coach, Ed Philion as Defensive line coach and Craig Davoren as Running backs coach and special teams assistant.

Jones' first major moves as head coach and general manager of the Roughriders occurred on December 15, when Jones cut 19 players from the roster including Tyron Brackenridge, Anthony Allen and Terrell Maze. On January 14, 2016, Jones continued the rebuild by cutting fan favourites and long-time Roughriders John Chick and Weston Dressler. Chick went on to sign with the Hamilton Tiger Cats, while Dressler went on to sign with rival Winnipeg Blue Bombers. However, the Roughriders suddenly signed defensive end Shawn Lemon to replace Chick soon after. Later that month, the Roughriders re-signed longtime receiver Rob Bagg. Jones departed after the 2018 season, being succeeded by Craig Dickenson on January 25, 2019.

== Craig Dickenson era (2019–present) ==
The Roughriders clinched their first first-place West Division finish since 2009 with a 13–5 record, in Craig Dickenson's first year at the coaching helm. However, the team lost in a hard-fought heartbreaker in the West Final game over the arch-rival (and eventual Grey Cup champion) Blue Bombers, 20–13. After a year-long hiatus, the Riders returned to the playoffs in 2021, finishing in second place at 9–5 in the shortened season, defeating the Calgary Stampeders in the West Semi-final, but losing to the Winnipeg Blue Bombers again (who would win their second straight Grey Cup championship) in the West Final for the second straight season. In 2022, the Riders missed the playoffs for the first time in six years, posting a 6–12 mark, good for fourth place in the West.

== See also ==
- Saskatchewan Roughriders all-time records and statistics
- List of Canadian Football League seasons
