= 1934 in Canadian football =

== Canadian Football News in 1934 ==
The Sarnia Imperials, who won nine-straight Ontario Rugby Football Union titles from 1931 to 1939, won its first Grey Cup title against the Regina Roughriders, who were playing in their seventh final in 12 years. It was the last time the Regina Roughriders made it to the Grey Cup until 1951. In its first seven trips, Regina was outscored by the opposition 176–27.

Eastern Intercollegiate Union formally withdrew from Grey Cup competition.

The horn was introduced to officiating.

== Regular season ==
=== Final regular season standings ===
Note: GP = Games Played, W = Wins, L = Losses, T = Ties, PF = Points For, PA = Points Against, Pts = Points

**Interprovincial Rugby Football Union**
Team	GP	W	L	T	PF	PA	Pts
**Hamilton Tigers**	6	3	1	2	47	39	8
Montreal AAA Winged Wheelers	6	3	2	1	54	42	7
Toronto Argonauts	6	3	2	1	51	38	7
Ottawa Rough Riders	6	1	5	0	34	67	2

Ontario Rugby Football Union
Team	GP	W	L	T	PF	PA	Pts
**Sarnia Imperials**	6	6	0	0	137	28	12
St. Michael's College	6	4	2	0	51	56	8
Hamilton Tiger Cubs	6	2	4	0	41	93	4
Toronto Balmy Beach Beachers	6	0	6	0	32	84	0

*Bold text means that they have clinched the playoffs.

Manitoba Rugby Football Union
Team	GP	W	L	T	PF	PA	Pts
Winnipegs	2	2	0	0	35	4	4
University of Manitoba Bisons	2	0	2	0	4	35	0

Saskatchewan Rugby Football Union
Team	GP	W	L	T	PF	PA	Pts
Regina Roughriders	6	6	0	0	156	25	12
Moose Jaw Millers	6	4	2	0	49	58	8
Saskatoon Hilltops	6	1	4	1	27	82	3
University of Saskatchewan Huskies	6	0	5	1	23	90	1

Alberta Rugby Football Union
Team	GP	W	L	T	PF	PA	Pts
University of Alberta Golden Bears	4	4	0	0	43	17	8
Calgary Altomahs *	3	1	2	0	31	28	2
Lethbridge Bulldogs *	3	0	3	0	12	41	0

* Final League game cancelled

British Columbia Rugby Football Union
Team	GP	W	L	T	PF	PA	Pts
Vancouver Meralomas	5	5	0	0	66	19	10
Vancouver Athletic Club Wolves	5	2	2	1	22	35	5
North Shore Lions	4	0	3	1	20	38	1
University of British Columbia Varsity	2	0	2	0	3	19	0

== League Champions ==
Football Union	League Champion
IRFU	Hamilton Tigers
WCRFU	Regina Roughriders
CIRFU	Queen's University
ORFU	Sarnia Imperials
MRFU	Winnipeg Pegs
SRFU	Regina Roughriders
ARFU	University of Alberta
BCRFU	Vancouver Meralomas

== Grey Cup playoffs ==
Note: All dates in 1934

=== CIRFU Finals ===
Date	Away	Home
November 17	Queen's University 8	University of Toronto 7

- Queen's does not participate in further competition

=== Semifinals ===
Western Semifinal 1
Date	Away	Home
November 1	University of Alberta Golden Bears 0	Vancouver Meralomas 5
November 3	University of Alberta Golden Bears 6	Vancouver Meralomas 8

- Vancouver advances to the Western Final

Western Semifinal 2
Date	Away	Home
November 3	Winnipeg 'Pegs 0	Regina Roughriders 8

- Regina advances to the Western Final.

=== Finals ===
Western Finals Game 1 & 2
Date	Away	Home
November 10	Regina Roughriders 22	Vancouver Meralomas 2
November 12	Regina Roughriders 7	Vancouver Meralomas 2

- Regina won the total-point series by 29–4. Regina advances to the Grey Cup game.

Eastern Final
Date	Away	Home
November 17	Sarnia Imperials 11	Hamilton Tigers 4

- Sarnia advances to the Grey Cup game.

== Playoff bracket ==
Quarterfinals
No game
EAST
No game
ARFU	University of Alberta	0-6
BCRFU	Vancouver Meralomas	5-8
WEST
SRFU	Regina Roughriders	8
MRFU	Winnipeg Pegs	0

Semifinals
ORFU	Sarnia Imperials	11
IRFU	Hamilton Tigers	4
BCRFU	Vancouver Meralomas	2-2
SRFU	Regina Roughriders	22-7

Grey Cup final
ORFU	Sarnia Imperials	20
SRFU	Regina Roughriders	12

== Grey Cup Championship ==
November 24 22nd Annual Grey Cup Game: Varsity Stadium – Toronto, Ontario
Regina Roughriders 12	Sarnia Imperials 20
The Sarnia Imperials are the 1934 Grey Cup Champions

== 1934 Eastern (Combined IRFU & ORFU) All-Stars selected by Canadian Press ==
NOTE: During this time most players played both ways, so the All-Star selections do not distinguish between some offensive and defensive positions.

=== 1st Team ===
- QB – Carl Pernia, Montreal AAA Winged Wheelers
- FW – Don Young, McGill University
- HB – Hugh Welch, Montreal AAA Winged Wheelers
- HB – Jack Taylor, Toronto Argonauts
- DB – Ted Morris, Toronto Argonauts
- E – Wes Cutler, Toronto Argonauts
- E – Seymour Wilson, Hamilton Tigers
- C – Lew Newton, Montreal AAA Winged Wheelers
- G – Bert Adams, Montreal AAA Winged Wheelers
- G – Jim Palmer, Toronto Argonauts
- T – Tommy Burns, Toronto Argonauts
- T – Pete Joktus, Montreal AAA Winged Wheelers

=== 2nd Team ===
- QB – Alex Hayes, Sarnia Imperials
- FW – Bud Andrew, Ottawa Rough Riders
- HB – Norm Perry, Sarnia Imperials
- HB – Jack Sinclair, University of Toronto
- DB – Abe Eliowitz, Ottawa Rough Riders
- E – Andy Henderson, University of Toronto
- E – Syd Reynolds, Toronto Balmy Beach Beachers
- C – John Metras, St. Michael's College
- G – Joe Veroni, University of Western Ontario
- G – John Baker, Sarnia Imperials
- T – Abe Zvonkin, Queen's University
- T – Dave Sprague, Ottawa Rough Riders

== 1934 Ontario Rugby Football Union All-Stars ==
NOTE: During this time most players played both ways, so the All-Star selections do not distinguish between some offensive and defensive positions.

- QB – Alex Hayes, Sarnia Imperials
- FW – Ormond Beach, Sarnia Imperials
- HB – Norm Perry, Sarnia Imperials
- HB – Hugh Marks, St. Michael's College
- DB – Hugh Sterling, Sarnia Imperials
- E – Syd Reynolds, Toronto Balmy Beach Beachers
- E – John Manore, Sarnia Imperials
- C – John Metras, St. Michael's College
- G – Pat Bulter, Sarnia Imperials
- G – Clifford Parsons, Sarnia Imperials
- T – Gil Putnam, Sarnia Imperials
- T – Harry Smith, Sarnia Imperials

== 1934 Canadian Football Awards ==
- Jeff Russel Memorial Trophy (IRFU MVP) – Ab Box (QB), Toronto Argonauts
- Imperial Oil Trophy (ORFU MVP) - Norm Perry - Sarnia Imperials
