= 1937 in Canadian football =

The Toronto Argonauts won the Grey Cup for the second time in five years.

== Canadian Football News in 1937 ==
The Quebec Rugby Football Union (QRFU) stopped challenging for the Grey Cup.

== Regular season ==
=== Final regular season standings ===
Note: GP = Games Played, W = Wins, L = Losses, T = Ties, PF = Points For, PA = Points Against, Pts = Points

**Western Interprovincial Football Union**
Team	GP	W	L	T	PF	PA	Pts
**Calgary Bronks**	8	5	3	0	47	70	10
**Winnipeg Blue Bombers**	8	4	4	0	57	47	8
Regina Roughriders	8	3	5	0	58	45	6

**Interprovincial Rugby Football Union**
Team	GP	W	L	T	PF	PA	Pts
**Toronto Argonauts**	6	5	1	0	72	43	10
**Ottawa Rough Riders**	6	3	3	0	52	46	6
Hamilton Tigers	6	2	4	0	42	63	4
Montreal Indians	6	2	4	0	35	49	4

Ontario Rugby Football Union
Team	GP	W	L	T	PF	PA	Pts
**Sarnia Imperials**	4	3	0	1	81	19	7
Toronto Balmy Beach*	3	1	1	1	41	23	3
Hamilton Panthers*	3	0	3	0	15	95	0

(*) Final Hamilton-Balmy Beach game was cancelled.

*Bold text means that they have clinched the playoffs.

Quebec Rugby Football Union
Team	GP	W	L	T	PF	PA	Pts
**Westmount Football Club**	6	4	2	0	46	28	8
CNR Nationals	6	3	2	1	54	48	7
Notre-Dame-de-Grace Eastward Yellow Jackets.	6	2	3	1	33	46	5
McGill University Seconds	6	2	4	0	25	36	4

British Columbia Rugby Football Union - Big Four
Team	GP	W	L	T	PF	PA	Pts
**North Shore Lions**	7	5	1	1	78	27	11
Vancouver Meralomas	7	3	3	1	43	58	7
Knights of Columbus	7	2	5	0	34	56	4
University of British Columbia Thunderbirds	3	1	2	0	16	30	2

== Grey Cup playoffs ==
Note: All dates in 1937

=== Division semifinals ===
IRFU Finals
Game	Date	Away	Home
1	November 20	Ottawa Rough Riders 15	Toronto Argonauts 11
2	November 27	Toronto Argonauts 10	Ottawa Rough Riders 1

- Toronto won the total-point series by 21–16. Toronto will play the Sarnia Imperials (ORFU Champions) in the Eastern Finals.

ORFU-QRFU Final
Date	Away	Home
November 20	Sarnia Imperials 63	Montreal Westmounts 0

- Sarnia advances to the Eastern Final.

=== Finals ===
Western Finals
Game	Date	Away	Home
1	November 6	Calgary Bronks 13	Winnipeg Blue Bombers 10
2	November 11	Winnipeg Blue Bombers 9	Calgary Bronks 1

- Winnipeg won the total-point series by 19–14. Winnipeg advances to the Grey Cup game.

Eastern Finals
Date	Away	Home
December 4	Toronto Argonauts 10	Sarnia Imperials (ORFU) 6

- Toronto advances to the Grey Cup game.

== Playoff bracket ==
Quarterfinals
IRFU	Toronto Argonauts	21
IRFU	Ottawa Rough Riders	16
EAST
ORFU	Sarnia Imperials	63
QRFU	Montreal Westmounts	0
WIFU	Calgary Bronks
BYE
WEST
WIFU	Winnipeg Blue Bombers	24
WIFU	Regina Roughriders	12

Semifinals
IRFU	Toronto Argonauts	10
ORFU	Sarnia Imperials	6
WIFU	Calgary Bronks	14
WIFU	Winnipeg Blue Bombers	19

Grey Cup final
IRFU	Toronto Argonauts	4
WIFU	Winnipeg Blue Bombers	3

== Grey Cup Championship ==
December 11 25th Annual Grey Cup Game: Varsity Stadium – Toronto, Ontario
WIFU Champion	IRFU Champion
Winnipeg Blue Bombers 3	Toronto Argonauts 4
The Toronto Argonauts are the 1937 Grey Cup Champions

- Note: Eastern Final Playoff date is not confirmed, however since the regular season in the East ended November 13, and all other playoff dates, as well as Grey Cup date are accurate, it is reasonable to assume the above date is accurate.

== 1937 Eastern (Combined IRFU & ORFU) All-Stars selected by Canadian Press ==
NOTE: During this time most players played both ways, so the All-Star selections do not distinguish between some offensive and defensive positions.

=== 1st Team ===
- QB – Arnie Morrison, Ottawa Rough Riders
- FW – Ormond Beach, Sarnia Imperials
- HB – Johnny Ferraro, Montreal Indians
- HB – Hugh Sterling, Sarnia Imperials
- HB – Stan O'Neil, Ottawa Rough Riders
- E – Wes Cutler, Toronto Argonauts
- E – Jimmy Simpson, Hamilton Tigers
- C – Dave Ryan, Montreal Indians
- G – Charles "Tiny" Hermann, Ottawa Rough Riders
- G – Tim Palmer, Toronto Argonauts
- T – Dave Sprague, Ottawa Rough Riders
- T – Mike Clawson, Sarnia Imperials

=== 2nd Team ===
- QB – Alex Hayes, Sarnia Imperials
- FW – Ted Morris, Toronto Argonauts
- HB – Hugh "Huck" Welch, Hamilton Tigers
- HB – Abe Eliowitz, Montreal Indians
- HB – Bob Isbister, Toronto Argonauts
- E – Bernie Thornton, Queen's University
- E – Syd Reynolds, Toronto Balmy Beach Beachers
- C – Jack Taylor, Toronto Balmy Beach Beachers
- G – Bill Irwin, Toronto Balmy Beach Beachers
- G – George Hornig, McGill University
- T – Tommy Burns, Montreal Indians
- T – Andy Anton, McGill University

== 1937 Ontario Rugby Football Union All-Stars ==
NOTE: During this time most players played both ways, so the All-Star selections do not distinguish between some offensive and defensive positions.

- QB – Alex Hayes, Sarnia Imperials
- FW – Ormond Beach, Sarnia Imperials
- HB – Ab Box, Toronto Balmy Beach Beachers
- HB – Herb Moores, Toronto Balmy Beach Beachers
- DB – Hugh Sterling, Sarnia Imperials
- E – Syd Reynolds, Toronto Balmy Beach Beachers
- E – Danny Daniels, Toronto Balmy Beach Beachers
- C – Jack Taylor, Toronto Balmy Beach Beachers
- G – Pat Bulter, Sarnia Imperials
- G – Bill Irwin, Toronto Balmy Beach Beachers
- T – Mike Clawson, Sarnia Imperials
- T – Cliff Parson, Sarnia Imperials

== 1937 Canadian Football Awards ==
- Jeff Russel Memorial Trophy (IRFU MVP) – Teddy Morris (FW), Toronto Argonauts
- Imperial Oil Trophy (ORFU MVP) - Ormond Beach - Sarnia Imperials
