= 1935 in Canadian football =

== Canadian Football News in 1935 ==
The Winnipegs (soon to be known as the Blue Bombers in 1936) became the first Western Canadian team to win the Grey Cup by defeating the Hamilton Tigers, 18–12, in Hamilton.

The Calgary club changed its name to Bronks.

The Canadian Intercollegiate Rugby Football Union returns to play for the Grey Cup for one more season.

The Winnipeg Victoria Rugby Club reformed on February 22, 1935. The nucleus of the team would be made up of players who played the 1934 season for the Deer Lodge junior team.

== Regular season ==
=== Final regular season standings ===
Interprovincial Rugby Football Union
Team	GP	W	L	T	PF	PA	Pts
Hamilton Tigers	9	7	2	0	124	52	14
Toronto Argonauts	9	6	3	0	97	90	12
Ottawa Rough Riders	9	5	4	0	104	98	10
Montreal AAA Winged Wheelers	9	0	9	0	48	133	0

Ontario Rugby Football Union
Team	GP	W	L	T	PF	PA	Pts
Sarnia Imperials	4	4	0	0	69	9	8
Toronto Balmy Beach	4	2	2	0	59	17	4
Hamilton Tiger Cubs	4	0	4	0	1	103	0

Intercollegiate Rugby Football Union
Team	GP	W	L	T	PF	PA	Pts
Varsity Blues	6	4	2	0	85	44	8
Queen's Golden Gaels	6	3	2	1	64	44	7
McGill Redmen	6	2	4	0	49	69	4
Western Ontario Mustangs	6	1	5	0	37	79	2

Manitoba Rugby Football Union
Team	GP	W	L	T	PF	PA	Pts
Winnipegs	3	3	0	0	97	4	6
Winnipeg Victorias	3	0	3	0	4	97	0

Saskatchewan Rugby Football Union
Team	GP	W	L	T	PF	PA	Pts
Regina Roughriders	4	4	0	0	135	13	8
University of Saskatchewan Huskies	4	2	2	0	35	62	4
Saskatoon Hilltops	4	0	4	0	12	107	0

Alberta Rugby Football Union
Team	GP	W	L	T	PF	PA	Pts
Calgary Bronks	4	4	0	0	66	10	8
University of Alberta Golden Bears	4	0	4	0	10	66	0
Lethbridge Bulldogs							

British Columbia Rugby Football Union
Team	GP	W	L	T	PF	PA	Pts
Vancouver Meralomas	4	3	1	0	61	33	6
Vancouver Athletic Club Wolves	4	3	1	0	33	43	6
North Shore Lions	4	0	4	0	28	46	0

== League Champions ==
Football Union	League Champion	Regular Season Champion
IRFU	Hamilton Tigers	Hamilton Tigers
WCRFU	Winnipegs
CIRFU	Queen's University	University of Toronto
ORFU	Sarnia Imperials	Sarnia Imperials
MRFU	Winnipegs	Winnipegs
SRFU	Regina Roughriders	Regina Roughriders
ARFU	Calgary Bronks	Calgary Bronks
BCRFU	Vancouver Meralomas	Vancouver Meralomas

== Grey Cup playoffs ==
Note: All dates in 1935

=== BCRFU tie-breaker final ===
Date	Away	Home
October 28	Vancouver Athletic Club Wolves 1	Vancouver Meralomas 8

Meralomas advance to West Semifinal

=== Division finals ===
CIRFU Finals
Date	Away	Home
November 16	Queen's Golden Gaels 6	Varsity Blues 4

- Queen's advances to the East Semifinal

ORFU Final Game 1 & 2ORFU Final Game 2
Date	Away	Home
November 16	Toronto Balmy Beach Beachers 0	Sarnia Imperials 8
November 23	Sarnia Imperials 9	Toronto Balmy Beach Beachers 1

- Sarnia won the total-point series by 17–1. Sarnia advances to the East Final.

=== Semifinals ===
Western Semifinal 1
Date	Away	Home
November 2	Vancouver Meralomas 0	Calgary Bronks 14

- Calgary advances to the Western Title game.

Western Semifinal 2
Date	Away	Home
November 2	Regina Roughriders 6	Winnipegs 13

- Winnipeg advances to the Western Title game.

East Semifinal
Date	Away	Home
November 23	Queen's University 4	Hamilton Tigers 44

- Hamilton advances to the East Final game.

=== Finals ===
Western Title Game
Date	Away	Home
November 9	Calgary Bronks 0	Winnipegs 7

- Winnipeg advances to the Grey Cup game.

Eastern Title Game
Date	Away	Home
November 30	Sarnia Imperials 3	Hamilton Tigers 22

- Hamilton advances to the Grey Cup game.

== Playoff bracket ==
Quarterfinals
ORFU	Sarnia Imperials	8
ORFU	Toronto Balmy Beach	0
EAST
IRFU	Hamilton Tigers	44
CIRFU	Queen's University	4
ARFU	Calgary Bronks	14
BCRFU	Vancouver Meralomas	0
WEST
SRFU	Regina Roughriders	6
MRFU	Winnipeg Pegs	13

Semifinals
ORFU	Sarnia Imperials	0
IRFU	Hamilton Tigers	22
ARFU	Calgary Bronks	0
MRFU	Winnipeg Pegs	7

Grey Cup final
IRFU	Hamilton Tigers	12
MRFU	Winnipeg Pegs	18

== Grey Cup Championship ==
December 7 23rd Annual Grey Cup Game: A.A.A. Grounds – Hamilton, Ontario
Winnipeg 'Pegs 18	Hamilton Tigers 12
The Winnipeg 'Pegs are the 1935 Grey Cup Champions

== 1935 Ontario Rugby Football Union All-Stars ==
NOTE: During this time most players played both ways, so the All-Star selections do not distinguish between some offensive and defensive positions.

- QB – Ab Box, Toronto Balmy Beach Beachers
- FW – Gord Patterson, Sarnia Imperials
- HB – Ormond Beach, Sarnia Imperials
- HB – Hugh Sterling, Sarnia Imperials
- HB – Rocky Parsaca, Sarnia Imperials
- E – Syd Reynolds, Toronto Balmy Beach Beachers
- E – Stan Reeve, Sarnia Imperials
- C – Bruce Spears, Sarnia Imperials
- G – Pat Bulter, Sarnia Imperials
- G – Bob Reid, Toronto Balmy Beach Beachers
- T – Ernie Hempey, Toronto Balmy Beach Beachers
- T – Cliff Parson, Sarnia Imperials

== 1935 Canadian Football Awards ==
- Jeff Russel Memorial Trophy (IRFU MVP) – Abe Eliowitz (RB), Ottawa Rough Riders
- Imperial Oil Trophy (ORFU MVP) - Hugh Sterling - Sarnia Imperials
