= 1933 in Canadian football =

== Canadian Football News in 1933 ==
The Toronto Argonauts lost their first two games of the season, only to storm back and win eight straight, including their first Grey Cup win in 12 years.

The Winnipeg St.John's were a no show at the annual meeting of the Manitoba Rugby Football Union. It was later learned that the St.John's had suspended operations for one season while they got their finances in order.

The MRFU made attempts to get another organization to take over the operations of the St.John's for the 1933 season. Although there was interest in taking over the team on a permanent basis, there was no interest in being custodian of the team for just one season.

In August, the players of the St.John's were dispersed between the Winnipegs and the Garrison. The Garrison was an Army team and only servicemen were eligible to play on the team. The Garrison claimed the only player who qualified (Alf Woods) and the remainder of the players ended up in the camp of the Winnipegs.

With an abundance of players available the Winnipegs operated two teams in 1933. The best players ended up on the Winnipegs who were wearing brand new blue jerseys (they weren't blue & gold until 1934). The remaining players wore the old green jerseys and they played under the name Shamrocks.

The Winnipeg St.John's failed to re-form in 1934.

The British Columbia Rugby Football Union did not have regular season play, but did play 8 games in 3 multi-game series to determine a western semi finalist, and later another final for the league championship.

== Regular season ==
=== Final regular season standings ===
Note: GP = Games Played, W = Wins, L = Losses, T = Ties, PF = Points For, PA = Points Against, Pts = Points

**Interprovincial Rugby Football Union**
Team	GP	W	L	T	PF	PA	Pts
**Montreal AAA Winged Wheelers**	6	4	2	0	67	55	8
**Toronto Argonauts**	6	4	2	0	86	54	8
Ottawa Rough Riders	6	3	3	0	61	75	6
Hamilton Tigers	6	1	5	0	43	73	2

Ontario Rugby Football Union
Team	GP	W	L	T	PF	PA	Pts
**Sarnia Imperials**	6	5	1	0	95	25	10
Toronto Balmy Beach Beachers	5	3	2	0	52	64	6
St. Michael's College	5	1	3	1	26	46	3
Hamilton Tiger Cubs	6	1	4	1	36	74	3

**Intercollegiate Rugby Football Union**
Team	GP	W	L	T	PF	PA	Pts
**Varsity Blues**	6	4	2	0	66	42	8
**Queen's Golden Gaels**	6	4	2	0	38	35	8
McGill Redmen	6	3	3	0	41	32	6
Western Ontario Mustangs	6	1	5	0	37	73	2

*Bold text means that they have clinched the playoffs.

Manitoba Rugby Football Union
Team	GP	W	L	T	PF	PA	Pts
Winnipegs	2	2	0	0	72	6	4
Garrison Rugby Club	2	0	2	0	6	72	0

Saskatchewan Rugby Football Union
Team	GP	W	L	T	PF	PA	Pts
Regina Roughriders	6	5	1	0	54	23	10
Moose Jaw Millers	6	5	1	0	60	15	10
University of Saskatchewan Huskies	6	2	4	0	26	19	4
Saskatoon Hilltops	6	0	6	0	3	86	0

*The Huskies defaulted the final game of the season to the Millers

Alberta Rugby Football Union
Team	GP	W	L	T	PF	PA	Pts
Calgary Altomahs	4	3	1	0	38	14	6
University of Alberta Varsity	4	1	3	0	14	38	2

== League Champions ==
Football Union	League Champion
IRFU	Toronto Argonauts
WCRFU	Winnipegs
CIRFU	University of Toronto
ORFU	Sarnia Imperials
MRFU	Winnipegs
SRFU	Regina Roughriders
ARFU	Calgary Altomahs
BCRFU	Vancouver Meralomas

== Grey Cup playoffs ==
Note: All dates in 1933

=== BCRFU Semifinals series ===
Date	Away	Home
September 23	New Westminster Dodekas 6	Victoria Capitals 1
October 4	Victoria Capitals 10	New Westminster Dodekas 8

New Westminster Dodekas win series on points, 14-11, advance to BCRFU finals series

Date	Away	Home
September 23	Vancouver Athletic Club Wolves 7	Vancouver Meralomas 6
September 30	Vancouver Meralomas 12	Vancouver Athletic Club Wolves 8
October 9	Vancouver Athletic Club Wolves 3	Vancouver Meralomas 12

Vancouver Meralomas win series 2 games to 1, advance to BCRFU finals series

=== BCRFU finals series ===
Date	Away	Home
October 14	Vancouver Meralomas 8	New Westminster Dodekas 2
October 21	New Westminster Dodekas 8	Vancouver Meralomas 23

Vancouver Meralomas win series on points, 31-10

=== BCRFU final ===
Date	Away	Home
November 25	Vancouver Athletic Club Wolves 5	Vancouver Meralomas 12

Vancouver Meralomas, evidentially playing a second final, win the BCRFU championship

=== WICRFU final ===
Date	Away	Home
November 11	University of Alberta Polar Bears 5	University of British Columbia Varsity 12

University of British Columbia Varsity, in front of a sellout crowd of 2500, win the western collegiate championship

=== CIRFU final ===
Date	Away	Home
November 18	Queen's Golden Gaels 3	Varsity Blues 10

- Toronto Varsity Blues quit the Grey Cup championship to focus on studies.
- Sarnia received a bye to the Grey Cup

=== West semifinals ===
Western Semifinal 1
Date	Away	Home
November 4	Regina Roughriders 1	Winnipegs 11

- Winnipeg advances to the Western Final.

Western Semifinal 2
Date	Away	Home
November 4	Vancouver Meralomas 11	Calgary Altomahs 13

- Calgary advances to the Western Final.

=== Finals ===
Western Final
Date	Away	Home
November 11	Calgary Altomahs 1	Winnipegs 15

- Winnipeg will face Toronto in the semifinal.

Eastern Final
Date	Away	Home
November 18	Toronto Argonauts 5	Montreal AAA Winged Wheelers 4
November 25	Toronto Argonauts 15	Montreal AAA Winged Wheelers 5

- Toronto won the total-point series by 20–9. Toronto advances to the Grey Cup semifinal.

=== East semifinal ===
Date	Away	Home
November 25	Toronto Varsity Blues	Sarnia Imperials

- Toronto Varsity Blues quit the Grey Cup championship to focus on studies.
- Sarnia received a bye to the Grey Cup

=== Grey Cup semifinal ===
Date	Away	Home
December 2	Toronto Argonauts 13	Winnipegs 0

- Toronto advances to the Grey Cup final.

== Playoff bracket ==
Quarterfinals
ORFU	Sarnia Imperials
BYE
EAST
CIRFU	University of Toronto	10
CIRFU	Queen's University	3
IRFU	Toronto Argonauts	5–15
IRFU	Montreal AAA Winged Wheelers	4–5
WEST
ARFU	Calgary Altomahs	1
MRFU	Winnipegs	15

Semifinals
ORFU	Sarnia Imperials
CIRFU	University of Toronto	Forfeit
IRFU	Toronto Argonauts	13
MRFU	Winnipegs	0

Grey Cup final
ORFU	Sarnia Imperials	3
IRFU	Toronto Argonauts	4

== Grey Cup Championship ==
December 9 21st Annual Grey Cup Game: Davis Field – Sarnia, Ontario
Toronto Argonauts 4	Sarnia Imperials 3
The Toronto Argonauts are the 1933 Grey Cup Champions

== 1933 Ontario Rugby Football Union All-Stars ==
NOTE: During this time most players played both ways, so the All-Star selections do not distinguish between some offensive and defensive positions.

- QB – Alex Hayes, Sarnia Imperials
- FW – Claude Harris, Sarnia Imperials
- FW – Art Synder, Toronto Balmy Beach Beachers
- HB – Norm Perry, Sarnia Imperials
- HB – Joe Connelly, St. Michael's College
- DB – Hugh Sterling, Sarnia Imperials
- E – Syd Reynolds, Toronto Balmy Beach Beachers
- E – Jimmy Burke, St. Michael's College
- C – John Metras, St. Michael's College
- G – Norman Mountain, Hamilton Tiger Cubs
- G – Johnny Baker, Sarnia Imperials
- T – Gil Putnam, Sarnia Imperials
- T – Clarence Burt, St. Michael's College

== 1933 Canadian Football Awards ==
- Jeff Russel Memorial Trophy (IRFU MVP) – Huck Welch (RB), Montreal AAA Winged Wheelers
