= 1936 in Canadian football =

== News ==
The Western Interprovincial Football Union (WIFU), direct predecessor of the CFL West Division was formed in August with the Winnipegs, Calgary Bronks, and the Regina Roughriders.

Teams were restricted to a maximum of five imports, and only players who had lived in Canada for a full year could compete in the Grey Cup game. When the Regina Roughriders won the first WIFU title, five of their imports were declared illegal by the Canadian Rugby Union (CRU). Regina offered to drop the players for the Grey Cup, but the CRU would not allow them to play for the cup. Instead, the Grey Cup was a contest between the Sarnia Imperials of the Ontario Rugby Football Union (ORFU) and the Ottawa Rough Riders of the Interprovincial Rugby Football Union (IRFU). Sarnia won their second and last Grey Cup with a powerful line-up that included future Hall of Famers Hugh (Bummer) Stirling and Ormond Beach.

The IRFU and WIFU adopted a two-game point series format for the playoffs. The series was played between first and second place teams.

A white ball was used in games played under floodlights in Western Canada.

Intercollegiate teams stopped competing for the Grey Cup.

The Regina Roughriders fielded two teams; the main, or "big" team in the WIFU, and the "little" Roughriders who played in the last SRFU season.

The Calgary Bronks played a full schedule in the Alberta Rugby Football Union including some games which conflicted with the WIFU schedule. For the open dates, the Bronks fielded the same team that was competing in the WIFU (5 games). For the remaining three games, the Bronks fielded a second team which was referred to as the Calgary Bronks 'B'. The final game of the regular season saw the Calgary Bronks square off against the University of Alberta Golden Bears. These teams were the two top teams in the ARFU, so it was decided that in addition to being the final regular season game, the game would also determine the ARFU championship.

== Regular season ==
=== Final regular season standings ===
Note: GP = Games Played, W = Wins, L = Losses, T = Ties, PF = Points For, PA = Points Against, Pts = Points

**Western Interprovincial Football Union**
Team	GP	W	L	T	PF	PA	Pts
**Winnipegs**	8	5	2	1	104	37	11
**Regina Roughriders**	6	3	2	1	52	42	9
Calgary Bronks	6	1	5	0	17	94	4

Calgary–Regina games are worth 4 points.

**Interprovincial Rugby Football Union**
Team	GP	W	L	T	PF	PA	Pts
**Toronto Argonauts**	6	4	2	0	74	37	8
**Ottawa Rough Riders**	6	3	3	0	49	63	6
**Hamilton Tigers**	6	3	3	0	62	71	6
Montreal Indians	6	2	4	0	45	59	4

Ontario Rugby Football Union
Team	GP	W	L	T	PF	PA	Pts
**Sarnia Imperials**	4	3	1	0	102	27	6
**Toronto Balmy Beach**	4	3	1	0	62	35	6
Hamilton Tiger Cubs	4	0	4	0	5	117	0

Bold text means that they have clinched the playoffs.

Saskatchewan Rugby Football Union
Team	GP	W	L	T	PF	PA	Pts
**Moose Jaw Millers**	4	2	1	1	14	23	5
Saskatoon Hilltops	4	2	2	0	26	11	4
Regina "Little" Roughriders	4	1	2	1	15	21	3

Alberta Rugby Football Union
Team	GP	W	L	T	PF	PA	Pts
**Calgary Bronks "B" side**	8	6	2	0	121	42	12
University of Alberta Golden Bears	5	4	1	0	30	20	8
Edmonton Hi-Grads All Stars	5	1	4	0	23	39	2
Lethbridge Bulldogs	6	1	5	0	14	87	2

British Columbia Rugby Football Union
Team	GP	W	L	T	PF	PA	Pts
Vancouver Athletic Club Wolves	7	5	2	0	52	36	10
Vancouver Meralomas	7	5	2	0	82	36	10
North Shore Lions	7	2	5	0	21	63	4
University of British Columbia Varsity	3	0	3	0	5	25	0

== Grey Cup playoffs ==
Note: All dates in 1936

=== BCRFU tie-breaker playoff ===
WIFU Semi-Finals
Game	Date	Away	Home
1	December 5	Vancouver Meralomas 0	Vancouver Athletic Club Wolves 7

Vancouver Athletic Club Wolves win BCRFU and advance (only to default.)

=== Division semi-finals ===
WIFU Semi-Finals
Game	Date	Away	Home
1	October 24	Winnipegs 7	Regina Roughriders 4
2	October 31	Regina Roughriders 20	Winnipegs 5

Regina won the total-point series 24–14 after Winnipeg started the series with a 2–0 lead.

IRFU Semi-Finals
Date	Away	Home
November 14	Ottawa Rough Riders 3	Hamilton Tigers 2

WIFU – SRFU Semi-Final
Date	Away	Home
November 7	Regina Roughriders	Moose Jaw Millers

Game to be played on November 7 in Winnipeg, but Moose Jaw Millers withdraw on November 5 and Regina advances to Final

ARFU – BCRFU Semi-Final
Date	Away	Home
November 7	Calgary Bronks "B" side	Vancouver Athletic Club Wolves

BCRFU forfeits game, Calgary Bronks "B" side advance to final. BCRFU forfeit game by deciding not to participate in Western playoffs. Numerous reasons were given, including cost and interrupting BCRFU schedule.

=== Division finals ===
WCRFU Finals
Date	Away	Home
November 11	Regina Roughriders 8	Calgary Bronks "B" side 1

Regina started the game with a 5–0 lead. Regina spotted five points to start the game as when WIFU organized, "it was agreed by all teams that the points separating the teams in the league standings would be carried into the western playdowns." Regina had a five point differential in points over Calgary in the WIFU standings. CRU did not allow Regina to play for the Grey Cup.

ORFU Finals
Date	Away	Home
November 21	Sarnia Imperials 11	Toronto Balmy Beach 7

Sarnia advanced to the Grey Cup game.

IRFU Finals
Game	Date	Away	Home
1	November 21	Ottawa Rough Riders 5	Toronto Argonauts 1
2	November 28	Ottawa Rough Riders 17	Toronto Argonauts 5

Ottawa won the total-point series 22–6 and advanced to the Grey Cup game.

== Grey Cup Championship ==
December 5 24th Annual Grey Cup Game: Varsity Stadium – Toronto, Ontario
Sarnia Imperials (ORFU) 26	Ottawa Rough Riders 20
The Sarnia Imperials are the 1936 Grey Cup Champions

== Eastern (combined IRFU and ORFU) All-Stars ==
The all-stars were selected by the Canadian Press. During this time most players played both ways, so the All-Star selections do not distinguish between some offensive and defensive positions.

=== 1st Team ===
- QB – Bob Coulter, Toronto Argonauts
- FW – Ormond Beach, Sarnia Imperials
- HB – Hugh Welch, Hamilton Tigers
- HB – Ab Box, Toronto Argonauts
- DB – Ted Morris, Toronto Argonauts
- E – Wes Cutler, Toronto Argonauts
- E – Seymour Wilson, Hamilton Tigers
- C – Fred Wigle, Montreal Indians
- G – Charles "Tiny" Hermann, Ottawa Rough Riders
- G – George Pigeon, Montreal Indians
- T – Dave Sprague, Ottawa Rough Riders
- T – Pete Joktus, Montreal Indians

=== 2nd Team ===
- QB – Arnie McWatters, Sarnia Imperials
- FW – Abe Eliowitz, Ottawa Rough Riders
- HB – Andy Tommy, Ottawa Rough Riders
- HB – Mike Hedgewich, Sarnia Imperials
- DB – Hugh Sterling, Sarnia Imperials
- E – Jack Holden, University of Toronto
- E – Syd Reynolds, Toronto Balmy Beach Beachers
- C – George Willis, University of Western Ontario
- G – Pat Butler, Sarnia Imperials
- G – George Hornig, McGill University
- T – Ernie Hempey, Toronto Balmy Beach Beachers
- T – Gus Greco, University of Toronto

== Awards ==
- Jeff Russel Memorial Trophy (IRFU MVP) – Arnie Morrison (QB), Ottawa Rough Riders
- Imperial Oil Trophy (ORFU MVP) – Syd Reynolds – Toronto Balmy Beach Beachers
