= Victoria Travellers Football Club =

Defunct Canadian football team

- Founded: 1926
- Folded: 1933
- Based in: Victoria, British Columbia
- League: British Columbia Rugby Football Union; Western Canada Rugby Football Union
- League titles: 1 league championship - 1926

The Victoria Travellers Football Club was a Canadian football that played in the British Columbia Rugby Football Union and the Western Canada Rugby Football Union from 1926 to 1933.

The team was sponsored by the Order of United Commercial Travelers, a service organization known for its good works, which had recently expanded into Canada. The sponsorship ended in 1928 but the club continued on under another name.

The Victoria Travellers Football Club won the first BCRFU championship, their only one in 8 seasons.

== Victoria Capitals ==
The team was renamed Capitals in 1929, and lasted to 1933. A popular sports club, it fielded several other sports teams.

== Victoria Revellers ==
The final BCRFU team in Victoria was the Revellers, playing in 1939 and 1940 and winning the championship in the league's final season.

== BCRFU season-by-season ==
Victoria Travellers Football Club
| Season | G | W | L | T | PF | PA | Pts | Finish | Playoffs |
|---|---|---|---|---|---|---|---|---|---|
| 1926 | 3 | 2 | 0 | 1 | 33 | 18 | 5 | 1st | Won BCRFU Championship, lost west semi final to St.John's Rugby Football Club, 21-2 |
| 1927 | 6 | 2 | 2 | 2 | 91 | 52 | 6 | 3rd | |
| 1928 | 6 | 2 | 4 | 0 | 59 | 66 | 4 | 3rd | |
Victoria Capitals
| Season | G | W | L | T | PF | PA | Pts | Finish | Playoffs |
| 1929 | 4 | 1 | 3 | 0 | 21 | 58 | 2 | 4th | |
| 1930 | 4 | 1 | 3 | 0 | 36 | 28 | 2 | 4th | |
| 1931 | 4 | 2 | 2 | 0 | 24 | 33 | 4 | 2nd | |
| 1932 | 5 | 1 | 4 | 0 | 46 | 101 | 2 | 4th | |
| 1933 | | | | | | | | | Lost BCRFU Championship 2 game playoff to New Westminster Dodekas on points, 14-11 (1-6 & 10–8) |

== Other Victoria, B.C. based team ==
Victoria Revellers
| Season | G | W | L | T | PF | PA | Pts | Finish | Playoffs |
|---|---|---|---|---|---|---|---|---|---|
| 1939 | 6 | 0 | 6 | 0 | 25 | 105 | 0 | 4th | Beat Knights of Columbus in BCRFU playoff, 6–1, lost final to University of British Columbia Thunderbirds, 17-6 |
| 1940 | 4 | 4 | 0 | 0 | 44 | 14 | 8 | 1st | Won BCRFU Championship |
