= Harry Badger =

Canadian football player

Profile
- Position: Halfback

Personal information
- Born: c. 1915; Saskatchewan, Canada
- Died: July 14, 1998 (aged 82–83); Winnipeg, Manitoba, Canada

Career history
- 1936–1940, 1947: Winnipeg Blue Bombers

Awards and highlights
- Grey Cup champion (1939)

Harry Haultain Badger (c. 1915 – July 14, 1998) was a Canadian professional football player who played for the Winnipeg Blue Bombers. He won the Grey Cup with them in 1939.
