= Norm Perry =

Norm Perry or Norman Perry may refer to:

- Norm Perry (Canadian football) (1904–1957), Canadian football player
- Norm Perry (journalist), Canadian broadcast journalist
- Norm Perry (tennis) (born 1938), American tennis player
