= Andy Mullen =

Canadian football quarterback

Andy Mullen (c. 1905 – October 1964) was the quarterback for the 1933 Toronto Argonauts of the Canadian Football League. He guided his team to the CFL championship in 1933, the 21st Grey Cup.
