= 1910 Regina Rugby Club season =

Season of the Canadian Football League

Results
- Record: 0–4
- Division place: 2nd, Saskatchewan Rugby Football Union
- Playoffs: N/A (no playoffs held)

The 1910 Regina Rugby Club season was the inaugural season of the team that would eventually become the Saskatchewan Roughriders of the Canadian Football League. Founded on September 6, 1910, the team originally wore gold and purple for the first season before electing to change the team colours for 1911 to blue and white to match the Regina Amateur Athletic Association (they then continued to wear red and black from 1912 to 1947).

== Regular season ==
=== Standings ===
Saskatchewan Rugby Football Union
Team	GP	W	L	T	PF	PA	Pts
Moose Jaw Tigers	4	4	0	0	74	18	8
Regina Rugby Club	4	0	4	0	18	74	0
