= Vancouver Athletic Club football team =

General information
- Founded: 1929; 97 years ago
- Folded: 1936; 90 years ago
- Headquartered: Vancouver, British Columbia

Nickname
- Wolves

League / conference affiliations
- British Columbia Rugby Football Union; Western Canada Rugby Football Union

Championships
- League championships: 0; 3 league championships

The Vancouver Athletic Club football team, commonly known as the Wolves, was a Canadian football team that played in the British Columbia Rugby Football Union and the Western Canada Rugby Football Union from 1929 to 1936. The team was part of the popular and successful Vancouver Athletic Club, which fielded teams in several other sports.

The Vancouver Athletic Club were a very successful team, winning 3 championships in 8 seasons.

Vancouver Knights of Columbus football team

General information
- Founded: 1937; 89 years ago
- Folded: 1939; 87 years ago
- Headquartered: Vancouver, British Columbia

Nicknames
- Kaycees, KC, K of C, or Irish

League / conference affiliations
- British Columbia Rugby Football Union; Western Canada Rugby Football Union

== Vancouver Knights of Columbus football team ==
After the Vancouver Athletic Club team disbanded, the majority of former players founded the Knights of Columbus football team a few days later. While the players were the same, the team was supported by the venerable service organization and was a separate club. The Vancouver Knights of Columbus team did not achieve their previous success, and ceased play after three seasons, from 1937 to 1939.

-

== BCRFU season-by-season ==
Vancouver Athletic Club Wolves
Season	G	W	L	T	PF	PA	Pts	Finish	Playoffs
1929	6	4	1	1	76	24	9	1st	Won BCRFU Championship, does not participate in west final
1930	5	2	3	0	22	19	4	3rd	
1931	7	7	0	0	109	17	14	1st	Won BCRFU Championship, lost west semi final to Calgary Altomah-Tigers, 4-6 & 1-14
1932	6	4	2	0	93	23	8	2nd	
1933									Lost semi final to Meralomas 1 games to 2, and lost again to Meralomas in BCRFU final, 5-12
1934	5	2	2	1	22	35	5	2nd	
1935	4	3	1	0	33	43	6	1st - tied	Lost BCRFU playoff to Meralomas, 8-1
1936	7	5	2	0	52	36	10	1st - tied	Won BCRFU Championship playoff over Meraloma, 7-0; forfeits semi final to Calgary Bronks
Vancouver Knights of Columbus football team
Season	G	W	L	T	PF	PA	Pts	Finish	Playoffs
1937	7	2	5	0	34	56	4	3rd	
1938	8	3	5	0	43	56	6	3rd	
1939	6	4	2	0	63	63	8	2nd	Lost BCRFU playoff to Victoria Revellers, 6-1
