= British Columbia Rugby Football Union =

The British Columbia Rugby Football Union was a Canadian football league, founded on September, 1, 1926. It lasted for 15 seasons, disbanding in 1941 as the Second World War brought most league football to a close. It was a member of the Western Canada Rugby Football Union along with the Alberta Rugby Football Union, Saskatchewan Rugby Football Union and the Manitoba Rugby Football Union.

In 1941, the Vancouver Grizzlies joined the WIFU and lasted only a season. Later, in 1954 Vancouver was awarded a Western Interprovincial Football Union franchise: the British Columbia Lions.

== Teams ==
- Victoria Travellers Football Club + Victoria Capitals
- Vancouver Meralomas
- University of British Columbia Varsity
- New Westminster Wildcats
- Vancouver Athletic Club Wolves
- New Westminster Dodekas
- North Shore Lions
- Knights of Columbus
- Victoria Revellers
- Vancouver Bulldogs

== BCRFU Champions ==
- 1926 Victoria Travellers Football Club
- 1927 University of British Columbia Varsity
- 1928 University of British Columbia Varsity
- 1929 Vancouver Athletic Club Wolves
- 1930 Vancouver Meralomas
- 1931 Vancouver Athletic Club Wolves
- 1932 Vancouver Meralomas
- 1933 Vancouver Meralomas
- 1934 Vancouver Meralomas
- 1935 Vancouver Meralomas
- 1936 Vancouver Athletic Club Wolves
- 1937 North Shore Lions
- 1938 North Shore Lions
- 1939 University of British Columbia Varsity
- 1940 Victoria Revellers

=== Totals ===
- 5 - Vancouver Meralomas
- 3 - University of British Columbia Varsity
- 3 - Vancouver Athletic Club Wolves
- 2 - North Shore Lions football team
- 1 - Victoria Travellers Football Club
- 1 - Victoria Revellers
