= 1929 in Canadian football =

== Canadian Football News in 1929 ==
CRU adopted use of the forward pass on a limited basis in Junior, Interscholastic, Western Canada Rugby Union, Western Intercollegiate Union and the Grey Cup final.

The first legal pass in Canada was thrown by Gerry Seiberling and the first reception was by Ralph Losie of Calgary Altomah-Tigers against Edmonton on September 21. Jersey Jack Campbell of Regina threw the first forward pass in a Grey Cup game and Jerry Erskine made the first reception. The first touchdown pass was by Edmonton's Joe Cook to Pal Power in the second quarter of a game against the University of Alberta on September 28. The first interception return for a touchdown was by Joe Hess of the University of Alberta in the same game when he caught a pass by Cook.

== Regular season ==
=== Final regular season standings ===
Note: GP = Games Played, W = Wins, L = Losses, T = Ties, PF = Points For, PA = Points Against, Pts = Points

**Interprovincial Rugby Football Union**
Team	GP	W	L	T	PF	PA	Pts
**Hamilton Tigers**	6	5	1	0	120	20	10
Montreal AAA	6	4	2	0	41	40	8
Toronto Argonauts	6	3	3	0	50	35	6
Ottawa Senators	6	0	6	0	12	124	0

Ontario Rugby Football Union
Team	GP	W	L	T	PF	PA	Pts
Eastern Section
**Toronto Balmy Beach Beachers**	6	6	0	0	104	27	12
Kitchener Panthers	6	3	3	0	59	33	6
St. Michael's	6	2	4	0	51	103	4
Camp Borden	6	1	5	0	14	65	2
Western Section
**Sarnia Imperials**	6	6	0	0	85	19	12
Windsor Greyhounds	6	3	3	0	50	73	6
Hamilton Tiger Cubs	6	2	4	0	40	66	4
Toronto Varsity Orphans	6	1	5	0	50	68	2

**Intercollegiate Rugby Football Union**
Team	GP	W	L	T	PF	PA	Pts
**Varsity Blues**	6	5	1	0	72	23	10
**Queen's Golden Gaels**	6	5	1	0	92	14	10
McGill Redmen	6	1	5	0	14	80	2
Western Ontario Mustangs	6	1	5	0	23	84	2

*Bold text means that they have clinched the playoffs

Manitoba Rugby Football Union
Team	GP	W	L	T	PF	PA	Pts
Winnipeg St.John's	4	2	2	0	42	35	4
Winnipeg Tammany Tigers	4	2	2	0	35	42	4

Saskatchewan Rugby Football Union
Team	GP	W	L	T	PF	PA	Pts
Regina Roughriders	4	3	0	1	41	6	7
Saskatoon Quakers	4	1	2	1	23	30	3
Moose Jaw Maroons	4	1	3	0	16	44	2

Alberta Rugby Football Union
Team	GP	W	L	T	PF	PA	Pts
Calgary Tigers	5	5	0	0	117	28	10
University of Alberta Polar Bears	3	1	2	0	28	26	2
Edmonton Eskimos	6	1	5	0	36	127	2

BCRFU - BC Big Four
Team	GP	W	L	T	PF	PA	Pts
Vancouver Athletic Club Wolves	6	4	1	1	76	24	9
University of British Columbia Varsity	6	4	2	0	57	31	8
Vancouver Meralomas	6	3	2	1	90	54	7
Victoria Capitals	4	1	3	0	21	58	2
New Westminster Wildcats	6	1	5	0	34	111	2

== League Champions ==
Football Union	League Champion
IRFU	Hamilton Tigers
WCRFU	Regina Roughriders
CIRFU	Queen's University
ORFU	Sarnia Imperials
MRFU	St John's College
SRFU	Regina Roughriders
ARFU	Calgary Tigers
BCRFU	Vancouver Athletic Club

== Grey Cup playoffs ==
Note: All dates in 1929

=== ARFU Edmonton City Championship ===
Date	Away	Home
November 16	University of Alberta Polar Bears 19	Edmonton Eskimos 3

=== MRFU Tie-Breaker ===
Date	Away	Home
October 30	Winnipeg St.John's 10	Winnipeg Tammany Tigers 1

- The Winnipeg St.John's advance to western playoff versus the Regina Roughriders

=== ORFU final ===
Date	Away	Home
November 11	Toronto Balmy Beach Beachers 0	Sarnia Imperials 3

- Sarnia advances to the East Semifinal.

=== CIRFU final ===
Date	Away	Home
November 16	Varsity Blues 5	Queen's Golden Gaels 15

- Queen's advances to the East Final.

=== East semifinal ===
Date	Away	Home
November 16	Sarnia Imperials 2	Hamilton Tigers 14

- Hamilton advances to the East Final.

=== East final ===
Date	Away	Home
November 23	Hamilton Tigers 14	Queen's Golden Gaels 3

- Hamilton advances to the Grey Cup game.

=== West semifinal ===
Date	Away	Home
November 2	Regina Roughriders 19	Winnipeg St.John's 3

- Regina advances to the West Final.

=== West final ===
Date	Away	Home
November 11	Calgary Tigers 8	Regina Roughriders 15

- Due to the BCRFU schedule being declared too long for the WCRFU playoffs Regina advances directly to the Grey Cup game.

== Playoff bracket ==
Quarterfinals
IRFU	Hamilton Tigers	14
ORFU	Sarnia Imperials	2
EAST
CIRFU	University of Toronto	5
CIRFU	Queen's University	15
no game
no game
WEST
SRFU	Regina Roughriders	19
MRFU	Winnipeg St.John's	3

Semifinals
IRFU	Hamilton Tigers	14
CIRFU	Queen's University	3
ARFU	Calgary Tigers	8
SRFU	Regina Roughriders	15

Grey Cup final
IRFU	Hamilton Tigers	14
SRFU	Regina Roughriders	3

== Grey Cup Championship ==
November 30 17th Annual Grey Cup Game: A.A.A. Grounds - Hamilton, Ontario
Regina Roughriders 3	Hamilton Tigers 14
The Hamilton Tigers are the 1929 Grey Cup Champions

== 1929 Canadian Football Awards ==
- Jeff Russel Memorial Trophy (IRFU MVP) – Red Wilson (?), Toronto Argonauts
