= Vancouver Meralomas football team =

General information
- Founded: 1926; 100 years ago
- Folded: 1938; 88 years ago
- Headquartered: Vancouver, British Columbia

Nickname
- the Lomas

League / conference affiliations
- British Columbia Rugby Football Union; Western Canada Rugby Football Union

Championships
- League championships: 0; 5 league championships

The Vancouver Meralomas football team was a Canadian football team that played in the British Columbia Rugby Football Union and the Western Canada Rugby Football Union from 1926 to 1938. The team was part of the popular and successful Meraloma Club. The Meralomas also fielded championship junior football sides for many decades.

The Meralomas were a very successful team, winning 5 championships in 13 seasons.

In 1926 the Meralomas were awarded the Harry Duker Cup for being Senior City Champions. In 1927 the team entered the Senior City League for the second time, winning the Harry Duker Cup again, but lost the Provincial Championship. Additionally, the team was a magnet for the best junior talent in Vancouver, benefiting from their rival's, the New Westminster Dodekas, program.

== BCRFU season-by-season ==
Season	G	W	L	T	PF	PA	Pts	Finish	Playoffs
1926	3	1	1	1	24	15	3	2nd	
1927	6	3	1	2	92	43	8	1st	Lost BCRFU Championship final to University of British Columbia Varsity, 8–5
1928	6	3	3	0	89	61	6	2nd	
1929	6	3	2	1	90	54	7	3rd	
1930	6	6	0	0	73	30	12	1st	Won BCRFU Championship, lost west final to Regina, 17-0 & 4–0
1931	7	2	4	1	45	66	5	4th	
1932	6	5	1	0	91	41	10	1st	Won BCRFU Championship, lost west semi final to Calgary Altomahs, 11-10 total points (6-5 & 4–6)
1933									Won BCRFU Championship by beating Vancouver Athletic Club 2 games to 1, New Westminster Dodekas 2 games to 0, and Vancouver Athletic Club in a final, 12–5; lost west semi final to Calgary Altomahs, 13–11
1934	5	5	0	0	66	19	10	1st	Won BCRFU Championship, won west semi final over University of Alberta Golden Bears (5-0 & 8–6), lost west final to Regina (2-22 & 2–7)
1935	4	3	1	0	61	33	6	1st	Won BCRFU Championship, lost west semi final to Calgary Bronks, 14–0
1936	7	5	2	0	82	36	10	1st - tied	Lost BCRFU playoff to Vancouver Athletic Club Wolves, 7–0
1937	7	3	3	1	43	58	7	2nd	
1938	8	0	8	0	3	115	0	4th	
