= 21st Grey Cup =

1933 Canadian Football championship game

Toronto Argonauts	Sarnia Imperials
(4–2)	(5–1)
4	3
Head coach: Lew Hayman	Head coach: Pat Ouellette
	1	2	3	4	Total
Toronto Argonauts	0	0	3	1	4
Sarnia Imperials	0	1	1	1	3
- Date: December 9, 1933
- Stadium: Davis Field
- Location: Sarnia, Ontario
- Referee: Jo-Jo Stirrett
- Attendance: 2,751

The 21st Grey Cup game was the Canadian football championship in 1933. Toronto Argonauts defeated Sarnia Imperials 4–3 at Sarnia's Davis Field on December 9 before a crowd of 2,751.

This was the last Grey Cup which a Western champion failed to qualify for on account to losing a semifinal game, with Toronto having beaten the WCRFU champion Winnipeg Pegs (the modern Winnipeg Blue Bombers) 13-0 in a semifinal game, although Western teams would later be absent from a number of Grey Cups due to a series of rules disputes and (later) due to interruption of regular league play during World War II.
