= Hugh Stirling =

Canadian football player (1907–1994)

Profile
- Position: Running back

Personal information
- Born: October 23, 1907; London, Ontario, Canada
- Died: May 28, 1994 (aged 86); Calgary, Alberta, Canada

Career history
- 1929–1938: Sarnia Imperials

Awards and highlights
- 2× Grey Cup champion (1934, 1936); Imperial Oil Trophy (1935); ORFU All-Star (1933); Lionel Conacher Award (1938)
- Canadian Football Hall of Fame (Class of 1966)

Hugh "Bummer" Stirling (October 23, 1907 – May 28, 1994) was a star football player for ten seasons for the Sarnia Imperials of the Ontario Rugby Football Union. He was inducted into the Canadian Football Hall of Fame in 1966 and into the Canada's Sports Hall of Fame in 1975.
