= 1930 in Canadian football =

== Canadian Football News in 1930 ==
The Winnipeg Rugby Club was formed on May 14 at the annual meeting of the MRFU. The team played as the Winnipegs and adopted the colours of green and white.

On September 29 in the first game played in Canada under floodlights, the Hamilton Tigers defeated the University of British Columbia in an exhibition game at Athletic Park.

The first game in Eastern Canada under floodlights was on October 29 between Oshawa and Toronto Balmy Beach in Toronto's Ulster Stadium.

The convert kicking spot was moved from the 35-yard line to the 25 but only drop kicks were allowed.

== Regular season ==
=== Final regular season standings ===
Note: GP = Games Played, W = Wins, L = Losses, T = Ties, PF = Points For, PA = Points Against, Pts = Points

**Interprovincial Rugby Football Union**
Team	GP	W	L	T	PF	PA	Pts
**Hamilton Tigers**	6	4	0	2	87	11	10
Toronto Argonauts	6	4	1	1	40	24	6
Montreal AAA Winged Wheelers	6	2	3	1	35	44	6
Ottawa Senators	6	0	6	0	7	90	0

Ontario Rugby Football Union
Team	GP	W	L	T	PF	PA	Pts
Eastern Section
**Toronto Balmy Beach Beachers**	4	4	0	0	74	44	8
Toronto Varsity Orphans	4	2	2	0	66	63	4
Camp Borden	4	0	4	0	39	89	0
Western Section
**Hamilton Cubs**	6	5	1	0	74	44	10
Sarnia Imperials	6	4	2	0	76	25	8
Kitchener Panthers	6	2	4	0	37	76	4
Windsor Greyhounds	6	1	5	0	22	64	2

**Intercollegiate Rugby Football Union**
Team	GP	W	L	T	PF	PA	Pts
**Queen's Golden Gaels**	6	5	1	0	39	12	10
Varsity Blues	6	3	2	1	34	32	7
Western Ontario Mustangs	6	2	4	0	18	18	4
McGill Redmen	6	1	4	1	13	42	3

*Bold text means that they have clinched the playoffs.

Manitoba Rugby Football Union
Team	GP	W	L	T	PF	PA	Pts
**Winnipeg St.John's**	4	4	0	0	75	5	8
Winnipegs	4	0	4	0	5	75	0

Saskatchewan Rugby Football Union
Team	GP	W	L	T	PF	PA	Pts
Regina Roughriders	4	4	0	0	46	6	8
Saskatoon Quakers	4	2	2	0	44	10	4
Moose Jaw Maroons	4	0	4	0	6	80	0

Alberta Rugby Football Union
Team	GP	W	L	T	PF	PA	Pts
Calgary Tigers	5	4	1	0	69	32	8
University of Alberta Polar Bears	4	2	2	0	19	37	4
Edmonton Boosters	5	1	4	0	42	61	2

BCRFU - BC Big Four
Team	GP	W	L	T	PF	PA	Pts
Vancouver Meralomas	6	6	0	0	73	30	12
University of British Columbia Varsity	6	4	2	0	76	41	8
Vancouver Athletic Club Wolves	5	2	3	0	22	19	4
Victoria Capitals	4	1	3	0	36	28	2
New Westminster Wildcats	5	0	5	0	8	97	0

== League Champions ==
Football Union	League Champion
IRFU	Hamilton Tigers
WCRFU	Regina Roughriders
CIRFU	Queen's University
ORFU	Toronto Balmy Beach
MRFU	Winnipeg St.John's
SRFU	Regina Roughriders
ARFU	Calgary Tigers
BCRFU	Vancouver Meralomas

== Grey Cup playoffs ==
Note: All dates in 1930

=== ORFU final ===
Date	Away	Home
November 10	Hamilton Cubs 6	Toronto Balmy Beach Beachers 18

- Sarnia advances to the East Semifinal.

=== East semifinal ===
Date	Away	Home
November 22	Hamilton Tigers 8	Queen's University 3

- Hamilton advances to the East Final.

=== East final ===
Date	Away	Home
November 29	Hamilton Tigers 5	Toronto Balmy Beach Beachers 8

- Toronto advances to the Grey Cup game.

=== West quarterfinal ===
Date	Away	Home
November 1	Winnipeg St.John's 0	Regina Roughriders 23

- Regina will play Calgary.

=== West semifinal ===
Date	Away	Home
November 10	Regina Roughriders 9	Calgary Tigers 6

- Regina advances to the Western Final.

=== Western Finals ===
Game	Date	Away	Home
1	November 13	Regina Roughriders 17	Vancouver Meralomas 0
2	November 15	Regina Roughriders 4	Vancouver Meralomas 0

- Regina won the total-point series by 21-0. Regina advances to the Grey Cup game.

== Playoff bracket ==
Quarterfinals
ORFU	Toronto Balmy Beach	18
ORFU	Hamilton Tiger Cubs	6
EAST
IRFU	Hamilton Tigers	8
CIRFU	Queen's University	3
BYE
BCRFU	Vancouver Meralomas
WEST
SRFU	Regina Roughriders	9
ARFU	Calgary Tigers	6

Semifinals
ORFU	Toronto Balmy Beach	8
IRFU	Hamilton Tigers	5
BCRFU	Vancouver Meralomas	0-0
SRFU	Regina Roughriders	17-4

Grey Cup final
ORFU	Toronto Balmy Beach	11
SRFU	Regina Roughriders	6

== Grey Cup Championship ==
December 6 18th Annual Grey Cup Game: Varsity Stadium - Toronto, Ontario
Regina Roughriders 6	Toronto Balmy Beach Beachers 11
The Toronto Balmy Beach Beachers are the 1930 Grey Cup Champions

== 1930 Canadian Football Awards ==
- Jeff Russel Memorial Trophy (IRFU MVP) – Frank Turville (RB), Toronto Argonauts
