= Sarnia Imperials =

Ontario-based Canadian football team

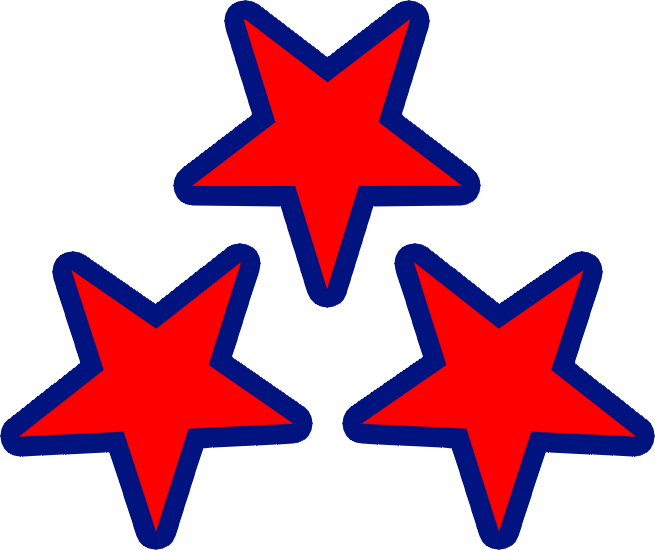
Logo

General information
- Founded: 1928; 98 years ago
- Folded: 1955; 71 years ago
- Stadium: Athletic Park / Norm Perry Memorial Park ~1931-1960
- Headquartered: Sarnia, Ontario, Canada
- Colours: Red, blue, gold, and white

Nickname
- Imps

League / conference affiliations
- Ontario Rugby Football Union 1929-1960: American Football Conference 1961; ORFU Group 1 (1928); ORFU Western (1929-1931)

Championships
- Grey Cup wins: 2; 1934 & 1936

The Sarnia Imperials were a professional-amateur Canadian football team competing in the Ontario Rugby Football Union (ORFU), based in Sarnia, Ontario. The team played their home games at Athletic Park (now known as Norm Perry Park). Preceding the formation of the Canadian Football League (CFL), teams in the ORFU contested for the Grey Cup until 1955. In their history, the Imperials appeared in three Grey Cup championship games, winning twice in 1934 and in 1936.

== History ==
=== Prewar ===
The Imperials first began playing in the ORFU in 1928, enjoying immediate success, as they finished first in their division that year, only to lose the ORFU final to the Toronto Balmy Beach Beachers. Their early success was attributed to being sponsored by Imperial Oil (for which the team was named and logo stylized after) during the Great Depression. Imperial Oil's involvement and offering of well-paying petrochemical industry jobs to players meant the team could attract high-quality talent. The team went on to enjoy great success for the next 12 years, missing the postseason only once and winning the ORFU final 10 of those 12 years. Sarnia played in their first Grey Cup championship game in 1933, which was also the only time the city hosted the Grey Cup game, but they lost a low-scoring affair, falling 4–3 to the Toronto Argonauts in the lowest-scoring Grey Cup game to date.

The team reversed their fortunes the next year, as they returned to the Dominion championship and came out victorious, defeating the Regina Roughriders 20–12 in the 22nd Grey Cup game. After losing to the Hamilton Tigers in the Eastern final in 1935, the Imperials returned to the Grey Cup game in 1936. The team secured their second Grey Cup win after their victory over the Ottawa Rough Riders in the 24th Grey Cup game. To date, they are the last amateur team to win the Grey Cup in peacetime.

While they did not return to the Grey Cup game, one of their more memorable victories came in 1937, when they crushed Montreal 63–0 in a Grey Cup quarterfinal. This came at a time when touchdowns were worth only five points. The Imperials ceased play in the ORFU after the 1939 season due to World War II.

=== Postwar ===
After the Second World War, the Imperials were not as dominant as they had been before, but recovered by 1949, finishing with a winning record every year from that year until the end of their existence. In their last 10 years of existence, they won two ORFU titles, in 1951 and 1952; they finished second several times in that span.

By this time, however, the ORFU was reckoned as a minor league. In the years after World War II, competing against the IRFU and the WIFU, both of which were now fully professional, became increasingly difficult. After the 1954 season, the ORFU dropped out of contention for the Grey Cup, beginning the modern era of professional Canadian football.

Overall, the Imperials won their first ORFU title in 1929, then reeled off nine straight Ontario championships from 1931 to 1939. They also won the ORFU crown in 1951 and 1952, giving them a total of 12 championships, in addition to their two Grey Cups.

The team played its home matches at Sarnia's Athletic Park (opened in 1928 and also referenced as Davis Field during 1933 Grey Cup), renamed in 1957 as Norm Perry Park after the former star football player and Sarnia mayor.

=== Golden Bears 1956-1961 ===
The team ceased operations in 1955. ORFU football in Sarnia returned under the name of the Sarnia Golden Bears for the 1956 ORFU season. The Golden Bears won the 1958 and 1959 ORFU championships. The Golden Bears then joined the American Football Conference in 1961 and ceased operations along with AFC in 1962.

== Canadian Football Hall of Famers ==
Imperials who were elected to the Canadian Football Hall of Fame, based solely on their play in Sarnia, included:

- Ormond Beach
- Tony Golab
- Jack Newton
- Norm Perry
- Bummer Stirling

Stirling was also named Canadian Male Athlete of the Year in 1938.

== ORFU season-by-season ==
Season	Wins	Losses	Ties	PF	PA	Points	Finish	Playoffs
1928	2	2	0	35	28	4	1st, ORFU Group 1	Lost ORFU final
1929	6	0	0	85	19	12	1st, ORFU Western	Lost East semifinal
1930	4	2	0	76	25	8	2nd, ORFU Western	Missed playoffs
1931	2	1	1	36	24	5	1st, ORFU Western	Lost East semifinal
1932	5	1	0	125	37	10	1st, ORFU	Lost East semifinal
1933	5	1	0	95	25	10	1st, ORFU	Lost 21st Grey Cup
1934	6	0	0	137	28	12	1st, ORFU	Won 22nd Grey Cup
1935	4	0	0	69	9	8	1st, ORFU	Lost Eastern final
1936	3	1	0	102	27	6	1st, ORFU	Won 24th Grey Cup
1937	3	0	1	81	19	7	1st, ORFU	Lost Eastern final
1938	3	1	2	95	27	8	1st, ORFU	Lost Eastern final
1939	3	1	2	70	38	8	2nd, ORFU	Lost Eastern final
1940-45	Did not play due to World War II.							
1946	4	6	0	88	158	8	4th, ORFU	Lost ORFU semifinal
1947	0	10	0	66	166	0	6th, ORFU	Missed playoffs
1948	3	5	1	72	130	8	3rd, ORFU	Missed playoffs
1949	8	4	0	142	101	16	2nd, ORFU	Lost ORFU final
1950	4	4	0	164	102	10	2nd, ORFU	Lost ORFU finals
1951	9	1	0	268	60	18	1st, ORFU	Lost Eastern final
1952	11	1	0	312	68	22	1st, ORFU	Lost Grey Cup semifinall
1953	8	4	0	231	101	16	2nd, ORFU	Lost ORFU semifinal
1954	7	4	1	218	193	15	2nd, ORFU	Lost ORFU final
1955	6	5	1	140	182	13	2nd, ORFU	Lost ORFU final
1956	6	5	0	218	247	12	3rd, ORFU	Lost semifinal to Kitchener-Waterloo
1957	6	5	1	367	169	13	3rd, ORFU	Lost semifinal to Kitchener-Waterloo
1958	9	1	0	339	187	22	1st, ORFU	Won ORFU final
1959	7	4	0	259	179	14	1st, ORFU	Won ORFU final
1960	3	7	0	232	335	6	3rd, ORFU	Team folded and joined AFC 1961

== AFC record by season ==
Season	W	L	T	PF	PA	Finish	Playoffs
1961	10	0	0	323	66	1st in Eastern Division	Won Championship vs Toledo Tornadoes

== Legacy ==
In 2006, the team was resurrected under the same name to play in the Northern Football Conference, Canada's top league for adult amateur play. This team left in 2024 to play in the Ontario Power 5 Football League.
