= Norm Perry (Canadian football) =

Canadian football player (1904–1957)

Profile
- Position: Running back

Personal information
- Born: June 1, 1904; Sarnia, Ontario, Canada
- Died: November 17, 1957 (aged 53); Sarnia, Ontario, Canada

Career history
- 1928–1935: Sarnia Imperials

Awards and highlights
- Grey Cup champion (1934); Imperial Oil Trophy (1934); 2× CFL All-Star (1933, 34)
- Canadian Football Hall of Fame (Class of 1963)

Norman (Norm) Perry (June 1, 1904 – November 17, 1957), nicknamed the Galloping Ghost, was a Canadian football player in the Ontario Rugby Football Union for the Sarnia Imperials for eight seasons. He was inducted into the Canadian Football Hall of Fame in 1963 and into Canada's Sports Hall of Fame in 1975.

== Early life ==
Born in 1904, Perry exhibited talent in lacrosse, hockey, baseball, and football. Perry turned down offers to play professional football in the United States, since his Imperial Oil refinery job in Sarnia's Chemical Valley offered better pay.

== Career ==
=== Sports ===
Perry played for the Sarnia Imperials for eight years, leading the team to seven Ontario Rugby Football Union titles and one Grey Cup title (1934, 22nd Grey Cup against the Regina Roughriders). Known for his speed, Perry scored 33 touchdowns in eight seasons (six regular games plus playoff games per season), and held a record for the most touchdowns scored in three consecutive years. He was named League Most valuable player in 1934. A leg injury forced his retirement in 1935. Perry served as president of the Ontario Rugby Football Union in 1953, ten years before his induction into the Canadian Football Hall of Fame.

=== Politics ===
In 1936, Perry ran for and was elected to an Alderman position on the Sarnia City Council. Three years later, at age 34, Perry was elected 56th Mayor of the city of Sarnia. Perry serviced one term before being defeated in his 1940 attempt at re-election.

=== Industry ===
Perry worked at the Imperial Oil refinery in Sarnia's chemical valley, serving as the safety supervisor and as an advisory board member for the Industrial Accident Prevention Association.

== Honours ==
The Norm Perry Park (formerly Sarnia Athletic Field, also known as Norm Perry Memorial Park) in Sarnia, Ontario, is named in honour of Norm Perry; the park is home to the Sarnia Imperials football team.
