= Ormond Beach (Canadian football) =

Canadian football player (1910–1938)

Profile
- Positions: Flying wing, linebacker

Personal information
- Born: October 23, 1910; Pawhuska, Oklahoma, U.S.
- Died: September 21, 1938 (aged 27); Sarnia, Ontario, Canada

Career information
- College: University of Kansas

Career history
- 1934–1937: Sarnia Imperials

Awards and highlights
- 2× Grey Cup champion (1934, 1936); 4× ORFU All-Star (1934, 1935, 1936, 1937); Imperial Oil Trophy (1937); 2× Second-team All-Big Six (1930, 1933)
- Canadian Football Hall of Fame (Class of 1963)

Ormond Beach (October 23, 1910 – September 9, 1938) was an American star football player in the Ontario Rugby Football Union for four seasons for the Sarnia Imperials. Beach, who led the Imperials to Grey Cup victories in 1934 and 1936, died aged 27 in an industrial accident. He was inducted into the Canadian Football Hall of Fame in 1963.

== See also ==
- List of gridiron football players who died during their careers
