= 1910 in Canadian football =

The University of Toronto successfully defended its inaugural Grey Cup championship with a victory over the Hamilton Tigers.

== Canadian football news in 1910 ==
The Regina Rugby Club was formed on September 13 at the Regina City Hall and adopted the colours of old gold and purple. Regina played the Moose Jaw Tigers in its first game on October 1 at the Moose Jaw Baseball Grounds, with the Tigers winning 16–6.

On September 22, the Saskatchewan Rugby Football Union was organized in the Flanagan Hotel at Saskatoon. The SRFU adopted the CRU rules.

Edmonton changed its name from Esquimaux to the Eskimos.

== Regular season ==
=== Final regular season standings ===
Note: GP = Games Played, W = Wins, L = Losses, T = Ties, PF = Points For, PA = Points Against, Pts = Points

**Interprovincial Rugby Football Union**
Team	GP	W	L	T	PF	PA	Pts
**Hamilton Tigers**	6	4	2	0	76	43	8
Toronto Argonauts	6	3	3	0	68	92	6
Ottawa Rough Riders	6	3	3	0	70	66	6
Montreal Football Club	6	2	4	0	74	87	4

Ontario Rugby Football Union
Team	GP	W	L	T	PF	PA	Pts
**Toronto Amateur Athletic Club**	6	5	1	0	78	46	10
Dundas Rugby Club	6	4	2	0	103	48	8
St. Michael's College	6	3	3	0	75	74	6
Toronto Parkdale Canoe Club	6	0	6	0	25	113	0

**Intercollegiate Rugby Football Union**
Team	GP	W	L	T	PF	PA	Pts
**Varsity Blues**	6	6	0	0	114	30	12
Queen's University	6	3	3	0	67	53	6
McGill Redmen	6	3	3	0	70	39	6
University of Ottawa	6	0	6	0	14	143	0

*Bold text means that they have clinched the playoffs

Manitoba Rugby Football Union
Team	GP	W	L	T	PF	PA	Pts
Winnipeg Rowing Club	4	3	1	0	61	28	6
St.John's Rugby Football Club	4	1	3	0	28	61	2

Saskatchewan Rugby Football Union
Team	GP	W	L	T	PF	PA	Pts
Moose Jaw Tigers	4	4	0	0	74	18	8
Regina Rugby Club	4	0	4	0	18	74	0

Calgary Rugby Football Union
Team	GP	W	L	T	PF	PA	Pts
Calgary Tigers	3	2	0	1	29	21	5
Calgary YMCA	3	0	2	1	21	29	1

Alberta Rugby Football League schools exhibition games
Team	GP	W	L	T	PF	PA	Pts
University of Alberta Varsity	2	1	1	0	30	30	2
Western Canada College	2	1	1	0	30	30	2

== League Champions ==
Football Union	League Champion
IRFU	Hamilton Tigers
CIRFU	University of Toronto
ORFU	Toronto Amateur Athletic Club
MRFU	Winnipeg Rowing Club
SRFU	Moose Jaw Tigers
ARFL	Calgary Tigers

== Grey Cup playoffs ==
Note: All dates in 1910

=== Alberta Rugby Football League playoffs ===
ARFL Finals Games 1 & 2
Date	Away	Home
October 31	Edmonton Eskimos 7	Calgary Tigers 25
November 5	Calgary Tigers 14	Edmonton Eskimos 12

- Calgary wins the total-point series 39-19.

=== East semi-final ===
Date	Away	Home
November 19	Toronto Amateur Athletic Club 3	Toronto Varsity Blues 22

- Toronto Varsity Blues advance to the Grey Cup.

== Playoff bracket ==
Semifinals
IRFU	Hamilton Tigers
BYE
CIRFU	University of Toronto	22
ORFU	Toronto Amateur Athletic Club	3

Grey Cup final
IRFU	Hamilton Tigers	7
CIRFU	University of Toronto	16

== Grey Cup Championship ==
November 26 2nd Annual Grey Cup Game: A.A.A. Grounds – Hamilton, Ontario
Toronto Varsity Blues 16	Hamilton Tigers 7
Toronto Varsity Blues are the 1910 Grey Cup Champions
