= 1931 in Canadian football =

== Canadian Football News in 1931 ==
The Ottawa Senators reverted to the name "Ottawa Rough Riders."

The Canadian Rugby Union approved the forward pass for all leagues and the first touchdown pass in Grey Cup history was a Warren Stevens to Kenny Grant play in Montreal's 22–0 win over Regina.

Convert scrimmage line was moved to the five-yard line, and the point could be scored by a drop-kick, place kick, run or pass.

The Montreal AAA Winged Wheelers were the first team outside Ontario to win the Grey Cup after shutting out the Regina Roughriders.

== Regular season ==
=== Final regular season standings ===
Note: GP = Games Played, W = Wins, L = Losses, T = Ties, PF = Points For, PA = Points Against, Pts = Points

**Interprovincial Rugby Football Union**
| Team | GP | W | L | T | PF | PA | Pts |
|---|---|---|---|---|---|---|---|
| **Montreal AAA Winged Wheelers** | 6 | 6 | 0 | 0 | 112 | 39 | 12 |
| Hamilton Tigers | 6 | 3 | 3 | 0 | 60 | 56 | 6 |
| Toronto Argonauts | 6 | 3 | 3 | 0 | 55 | 64 | 6 |
| Ottawa Rough Riders | 6 | 0 | 6 | 0 | 31 | 98 | 0 |

Ontario Rugby Football Union
| Team | GP | W | L | T | PF | PA | Pts |
|---|---|---|---|---|---|---|---|
Eastern Section
| **Toronto Balmy Beach Beachers** | 4 | 3 | 1 | 0 | 52 | 4 | 6 |
| Kitchener Panthers | 4 | 2 | 2 | 0 | 18 | 41 | 4 |
| Toronto Varsity Orphans | 4 | 1 | 3 | 0 | 15 | 40 | 2 |
Western Section
| **Sarnia Imperials** | 4 | 2 | 1 | 1 | 36 | 24 | 5 |
| Windsor Greyhounds | 4 | 2 | 2 | 0 | 45 | 33 | 4 |
| Hamilton Tiger Cubs | 4 | 1 | 2 | 1 | 25 | 49 | 3 |

**Intercollegiate Rugby Football Union**
| Team | GP | W | L | T | PF | PA | Pts |
|---|---|---|---|---|---|---|---|
| **Western Ontario Mustangs** | 6 | 4 | 2 | 0 | 30 | 28 | 8 |
| McGill Redmen | 6 | 3 | 2 | 1 | 41 | 31 | 7 |
| Queen's Golden Gaels | 6 | 3 | 2 | 1 | 27 | 38 | 7 |
| Varsity Blues | 6 | 1 | 5 | 0 | 34 | 35 | 2 |

*Bold text means that they have clinched the playoffs.

Manitoba Rugby Football Union
| Team | GP | W | L | T | PF | PA | Pts |
|---|---|---|---|---|---|---|---|
| **Winnipeg St.John's** | 3 | 3 | 0 | 0 | 29 | 5 | 6 |
| Winnipegs | 4 | 1 | 3 | 0 | 15 | 31 | 2 |
| University of Manitoba Varsity | 1 | 0 | 1 | 0 | 2 | 10 | 0 |

Saskatchewan Rugby Football Union
| Team | GP | W | L | T | PF | PA | Pts |
|---|---|---|---|---|---|---|---|
| Regina Roughriders | 4 | 4 | 0 | 0 | 78 | 7 | 8 |
| Saskatoon Quakers | 4 | 2 | 2 | 0 | 28 | 48 | 4 |
| Moose Jaw Maroons | 4 | 0 | 4 | 0 | 8 | 54 | 0 |

Alberta Rugby Football Union
| Team | GP | W | L | T | PF | PA | Pts |
|---|---|---|---|---|---|---|---|
| Calgary Altomah-Tigers | 4 | 3 | 1 | 0 | 24 | 20 | 6 |
| Edmonton Boosters | 4 | 1 | 3 | 0 | 20 | 24 | 2 |

British Columbia Rugby Football Union
| Team | GP | W | L | T | PF | PA | Pts |
|---|---|---|---|---|---|---|---|
| Vancouver Athletic Club Wolves | 7 | 7 | 0 | 0 | 109 | 17 | 14 |
| Victoria Capitals | 4 | 2 | 2 | 0 | 24 | 33 | 8 |
| University of British Columbia Varsity | 7 | 2 | 4 | 1 | 25 | 46 | 7 |
| Vancouver Meralomas | 7 | 2 | 4 | 1 | 45 | 66 | 5 |
| New Westminster Dodekas | 7 | 2 | 5 | 0 | 23 | 64 | 4 |

* Victoria Games worth 4 points in standings

== League Champions ==
| Football Union | League Champion |
|---|---|
| IRFU | Montreal AAA Winged Wheelers |
| WCRFU | Regina Roughriders |
| CIRFU | University of Western Ontario |
| ORFU | Sarnia Imperials |
| MRFU | Winnipeg St.John's |
| SRFU | Regina Roughriders |
| ARFU | Calgary Altomahs-Tigers |
| BCRFU | Vancouver Athletic Club |

== Grey Cup playoffs ==
Note: All dates in 1931

=== ORFU final ===
| Date | Away | Home |
|---|---|---|
| November 14 | Toronto Balmy Beach Beachers 0 | Sarnia Imperials 10 |

- Sarnia advances to the East Semifinal.

=== East semifinal ===
| Date | Away | Home |
|---|---|---|
| November 21 | Western Ontario Mustangs 7 | Sarnia Imperials 1 |

- Western Ontario advances to the East Final.

=== East final ===
| Date | Away | Home |
|---|---|---|
| November 28 | Montreal AAA Winged Wheelers 22 | Western Ontario Mustangs 0 |

- Montreal advances to the Grey Cup game.

=== Western semifinals ===
Western Semifinals Game 1 & 2
| Date | Away | Home |
|---|---|---|
| November 4 | Vancouver Athletic Club 4 | Calgary Altomah-Tigers 6 |
| November 7 | Vancouver Athletic Club 1 | Calgary Altomah-Tigers 14 |

- Calgary won the total-point series by 20–5. Calgary advances to the Western Final.

| Date | Away | Home |
|---|---|---|
| November 7 | Regina Roughriders 47 | Winnipeg St.John's 5 |

- Regina advances to the Western Final.

=== West Finals ===
| Date | Away | Home |
|---|---|---|
| November 11 | Calgary Altomahs-Tigers 2 | Regina Roughriders 26 |

- Regina advances to the Grey Cup game.

== Playoff bracket ==
Quarterfinals
IRFU | Montreal AAA Winged Wheelers
BYE
EAST
CIRFU | University of Western Ontario | 7
ORFU | Sarnia Imperials | 1
ARFU | Calgary Altomahs | 6-14
BCRFU | Vancouver Athletic Club | 4-1
WEST
SRFU | Regina Roughriders | 47
MRFU | Winnipeg St.John's | 7

Semifinals
IRFU | Montreal AAA Winged Wheelers | 22
CIRFU | University of Western Ontario | 0
ARFU | Calgary Altomahs | 2
SRFU | Regina Roughriders | 26

Grey Cup final
IRFU | Montreal AAA Winged Wheelers | 22
SRFU | Regina Roughriders | 0

== Grey Cup Championship ==
December 5 19th Annual Grey Cup Game: Percival Molson Memorial Stadium – Montreal, Quebec
| Regina Roughriders 0 | Montreal AAA Winged Wheelers 22 |
The Montreal AAA Winged Wheelers are the 1931 Grey Cup Champions

== 1931 Canadian Football Awards ==
- Jeff Russel Memorial Trophy (IRFU MVP) – Gordie Perry (RB), Montreal AAA Winged Wheelers
