= Ab Box =

Canadian Football League player (1909–2000)

Profile
- Position: Running back

Personal information
- Born: March 8, 1909; Toronto, Ontario, Canada
- Died: July 30, 2000 (aged 91); Toronto, Ontario, Canada

Career information
- College: Malvern Collegiate Institute

Career history
- 1930–31: Toronto Balmy Beach Beachers
- 1932–34: Toronto Argonauts
- 1935–38: Toronto Balmy Beach Beachers

Awards and highlights
- Grey Cup champion (1930); Jeff Russel Memorial Trophy (1934)
- Canadian Football Hall of Fame (Class of 1965)

Albert George "Ab" Box (March 8, 1909 – July 30, 2000) was a Canadian professional football halfback, quarterback and punter.

Born in Toronto, Box attended Malvern Collegiate Institute where he played on the football team and later on the Malvern Grads junior team from 1928 to 1929 under coach Ted Reeve. Box then moved to the senior Ontario Rugby Football Union, again playing under Reeve with the Toronto Balmy Beach Beachers from 1930 to 1931, winning the Grey Cup in 1930. Box then played three seasons with the Toronto Argonauts, winning another Grey Cup in 1933 and being voted the Jeff Russel Memorial Trophy winner as the most valuable player for 1934. He returned to Balmy Beach in 1935 and played another four years there.

Box also played on championship baseball and softball teams.

He has been inducted into the Canadian Football Hall of Fame (1965) and Canada's Sports Hall of Fame (1975). A sportswriter for the Toronto Telegram from 1932 to 1935, Box was known not only for his incredible athletic ability but also for his superb sportsmanship. After his retirement, he worked as a salesman during the winter and operated South Lake Lodge near Minden Ontario during the summer. Box died in Toronto at age 91.
