= 24th Grey Cup =

1936 Canadian Football championship game

Ottawa Rough Riders	Sarnia Imperials
(3–3)	(3–1)
20	26
Head coach: Billy Hughes	Head coach: Art Massucci
	1	2	3	4	Total
Ottawa Rough Riders	5	7	0	8	20
Sarnia Imperials	12	12	2	0	26
- Date: December 5, 1936
- Stadium: Varsity Stadium
- Location: Toronto
- Attendance: 5,883

The 24th Grey Cup was played on December 5, 1936, before 5,883 fans at Varsity Stadium at Toronto.

The Sarnia Imperials defeated the Ottawa Rough Riders 26–20.
