= Syd Reynolds =

Offensive end in Ontario Rugby Football Union

Profile
- Position: End

Career information
- College: McMaster University

Career history
- 1930–38, 40, 45: Toronto Balmy Beach Beachers

Awards and highlights
- Grey Cup champion (1930); 5× CFL All-Star (1933, 34, 36, 37, 38); ORFU Imperial Oil Trophy (1956)

Syd "Professor" Reynolds was an offensive end in the Ontario Rugby Football Union.

A graduate of McMaster University, he joined the Toronto Balmy Beach Beachers in 1930, their last Grey Cup championship season. Over the next 9 years he was an all-star 5 times and won the Imperial Oil Trophy as MVP in the ORFU in 1936. He played 2 more seasons with the Beachers, 1940 and 1945.
