= 22nd Grey Cup =

1934 Canadian Football championship game

Regina Roughriders	Sarnia Imperials
(6–0)	(6–0)
12	20
Head coach: Greg Grassick	Head coach: Art Massucci
	1	2	3	4	Total
Regina Roughriders	0	5	1	6	12
Sarnia Imperials	5	6	6	3	20
- Date: November 24, 1934
- Stadium: Varsity Stadium
- Location: Toronto
- Attendance: 8,900

The 22nd Grey Cup was played on November 24, 1934, before 8,900 fans at Varsity Stadium at Toronto.

The Sarnia Imperials defeated the Regina Roughriders 20–12.
