= List of Toronto Argonauts seasons =

This is a list of seasons competed by the Toronto Argonauts, a Canadian Football League team. While the team was founded in 1873, they did not join the Interprovincial Rugby Football Union until it was founded in 1907. The IRFU ultimately merged with the Western Interprovincial Football Union and formed the CFL in 1958, which the Argos have been competing in ever since. Throughout their history, the Argos have won 19 Grey Cups (including 10 before the CFL was formed), more than any other team.

| Grey Cup/Dominion Championships† | Division Championships* | Regular season Championships^ |

| League Season | Argonauts Season | League | Division | Finish | Wins | Losses | Ties | Playoffs |
|---|---|---|---|---|---|---|---|---|
| 1883 | 1883 | ORFU | – | No regular season | | | | Won ORFU Second Round (Peterboro FC) 30-7; Won ORFU Quarter Finals (Upper Canada College) 9-4; Won ORFU Semi Finals (University of Toronto) 24-1; Won ORFU Finals (Ottawa FC) 9-7 |
| 1884 | 1884 | ORFU | – | No regular season | | | | Won ORFU First Round (Peterboro FC) 27-8; Won ORFU Quarter Finals (University of Toronto) 24-0; Won ORFU Semi Finals (Tigers) 24-4; Won ORFU Finals (Ottawa FC) by default Lost Dominion Championship (Montreal FC) 30-0 |
| 1885 | 1885 | ORFU | – | No regular season | | | | Won ORFU First Round (Peterboro FC) 10-0; Lost ORFU Second Round (Upper Canada College) 11-6 |
| 1886 | 1886 | ORFU | – | No regular season | | | | Won ORFU City First Round (Tigers) 22-0; Won ORFU City Quarter Finals (Peterboro FC) 68-6; Won ORFU City Semi Finals (Ottawa FC) 12-7; Won ORFU City Finals (London Kickers) 24-7; Lost ORFU Finals (Ottawa College) 13-0 |
| 1887 | 1887 | ORFU | – | No regular season | | | | Lost ORFU City Quarter Finals (Tigers) 10-8 |
| 1888 | 1888 | ORFU | – | No regular season | | | | Won ORFU Challenge Series (Upper Canada College) 35-1; Lost ORFU Challenge Series (Tigers) 12-4 |
| 1889 | 1889 | ORFU | – | No regular season | | | | Won ORFU Challenge Series (Upper Canada College) 43-0; Won ORFU Challenge Series (Stratford Rugby Club) 45-0; Won ORFU Challenge Series (Tigers) 46-0; Lost ORFU Final (Ottawa College) 17-2 |
| 1890 | 1890 | ORFU | – | No regular season | | | | Lost ORFU Quarter-Finals (Tigers) 8-5 |
| 1891 | 1891 | ORFU | – | No regular season | | | | Lost ORFU Quarter-Finals (Tigers) 2-0 series (67-18 points) |
| 1892 | 1892 | ORFU | – | No regular season | | | | Won ORFU First Round (University of Toronto) 2-0 series (31-13 points); Won ORFU Quarter-Finals (Ottawa College) 34-5; Lost ORFU Semi-Finals (Tigers) 5-1 |
| 1893 | 1893 | ORFU | – | No regular season | | | | Won ORFU Quarter-Final (Ottawa FC) 1-1 series (44-15 points); Won ORFU Semi-Final (Osgoode Hall) 1-1 series (49-47 points); Lost ORFU Final (Queen's) 2-0 series (55-4 points) |
| 1894 | 1894 | ORFU | – | No regular season | | | | Lost ORFU Quarter-Final (Tigers) 2-0 series (54-15 points) |
| 1895 | 1895 | ORFU | – | did not participate due to a rules dispute with the ORFU | | | | |
| 1896 | 1896 | ORFU | – | did not participate due to a rules dispute with the ORFU | | | | |
| 1897 | 1897 | ORFU | – | did not participate due to a rules dispute with the ORFU | | | | |
| 1898 | 1898 | ORFU | senior series | 4th | 0 | 6 | 0 | |
| 1899 | 1899 | ORFU | senior series | 3rd | 2 | 4 | 0 | |
| 1900 | 1900 | ORFU | senior series | 1st | 4 | 2 | 0 | Lost League Playoff (Rough Riders) 20-12 |
| 1901 | 1901 | ORFU* | senior series | 1st^ | 5 | 1 | 0 | Lost Dominion Championship (Ottawa College) 1-0-1 series (30-15 points) |
| 1902 | 1902 | ORFU | senior series | 2nd | 2 | 2 | 0 | |
| 1903 | 1903 | | | Resigned from ORFU senior series due to rules dispute | | | | |
| 1904 | 1904 | ORFU | senior series (district 1) | 1st | 2 | 2 | 0 | Lost District Playoff Semi-final (Toronto Rugby Club) 14-4 |
| 1905 | 1905 | ORFU | senior series | 2nd | 4 | 2 | 0 | |
| 1906 | 1906 | ORFU | senior series | 2nd | 4 | 2 | 0 | |
| 1907 | 1907 | IRFU | – | 4th | 1 | 5 | 0 | |
| 1908 | 1908 | IRFU | – | 4th | 1 | 5 | 0 | |
| 1909 | 1909 | IRFU | – | 3rd | 1 | 5 | 0 | |
| 1910 | 1910 | IRFU | – | 2nd | 3 | 3 | 0 | |
| 1911 | 1911 | IRFU* | – | 1st^ | 5 | 1 | 0 | Won East Semi-Final (Alerts) 9-2; Lost Grey Cup (University of Toronto) 14-7 |
| 1912 | 1912 | IRFU* | – | 1st^ | 5 | 1 | 0 | Won East Semi-Final (University of Toronto) 22-16; Lost Grey Cup (Alerts) 11-4 |
| 1913 | 1913 | IRFU | – | 3rd | 3 | 3 | 0 | |
| 1914 | 1914 | IRFU†* | – | 2nd | 5 | 1 | 0 | Won League Playoff (Tigers) 11-4; Won East Final (Hamilton Rowing Club) 16-14; Won Grey Cup (University of Toronto) 14-2 |
| 1915 | 1915 | IRFU | – | 2nd | 4 | 2 | 0 | |
| 1916 | 1916 | IRFU | – | Season suspended due to World War I | | | | |
| 1917 | 1917 | IRFU | – | Season suspended due to World War I | | | | |
| 1918 | 1918 | IRFU | – | Season suspended due to World War I | | | | |
| 1919 | 1919 | IRFU | – | 2nd | 3 | 3 | 0 | |
| 1920 | 1920 | IRFU* | – | 1st^ | 5 | 1 | 0 | Won East Final (Toronto RAA) 7-6; Lost Grey Cup (University of Toronto) 16-3 |
| 1921 | 1921 | IRFU†* | – | 1st^ | 6 | 0 | 0 | Won East Semi-Final (University of Toronto) 20-12; Won East Final (Toronto Parkdale CC) 16-8; Won Grey Cup (Eskimos) 23-0 |
| 1922 | 1922 | IRFU* | – | 1st^ | 5 | 0 | 1 | Won East Semi-Final (Toronto Parkdale CC) 20-1; Lost East Final (Queen's) 12-11 |
| 1923 | 1923 | IRFU | – | 2nd | 3 | 1 | 2 | |
| 1924 | 1924 | IRFU | – | 2nd | 4 | 2 | 0 | |
| 1925 | 1925 | IRFU | – | 4th | 2 | 4 | 0 | |
| 1926 | 1926 | IRFU | – | 3rd | 3 | 3 | 0 | |
| 1927 | 1927 | IRFU | – | 3rd | 2 | 3 | 1 | |
| 1928 | 1928 | IRFU | – | 3rd | 1 | 4 | 1 | |
| 1929 | 1929 | IRFU | – | 3rd | 3 | 3 | 0 | |
| 1930 | 1930 | IRFU | – | 2nd | 4 | 1 | 1 | |
| 1931 | 1931 | IRFU | – | 3rd | 3 | 3 | 0 | |
| 1932 | 1932 | IRFU | – | 3rd | 3 | 3 | 0 | |
| 1933 | 1933 | IRFU†* | – | 2nd | 4 | 2 | 0 | Won IRFU Finals (AAA Winged Wheelers) 2-0 series (20-9 points); Won Grey Cup Semi-Final (Winnipegs) 13-0; Won Grey Cup (Imperials) 4-3 |
| 1934 | 1934 | IRFU | – | 3rd | 3 | 2 | 1 | |
| 1935 | 1935 | IRFU | – | 2nd | 6 | 3 | 0 | |
| 1936 | 1936 | IRFU | – | 1st^ | 4 | 2 | 0 | Lost IRFU Finals (Rough Riders) 2-0 series (22-6 points) |
| 1937 | 1937 | IRFU†* | – | 1st^ | 5 | 1 | 0 | Won IRFU Finals (Rough Riders) 21-16; Won Eastern Finals (Imperials) 10-6; Won Grey Cup (Blue Bombers) 4-3 |
| 1938 | 1938 | IRFU†* | – | 2nd | 5 | 1 | 0 | Won IRFU Finals (Rough Riders) 2-0 series (14-4 points); Won Eastern Finals (Imperials) 25-8; Won Grey Cup (Blue Bombers) 30-7 |
| 1939 | 1939 | IRFU | – | 2nd | 4 | 1 | 1 | Lost IRFU Finals (Rough Riders) 2-0 series (39-6 points) |
| 1940 | 1940 | IRFU | – | 2nd | 4 | 2 | 0 | Lost IRFU Finals (Rough Riders) 2-0 series (20-2 points) |
| 1941 (Note: The CFL does not recognize the club's 1941 season, in which the it competed in the ERFU as the IRFU had been suspended for WWII, as official league games.) | 1941 | ERFU | – | 2nd | 5 | 1 | 0 | Lost ERFU Finals (Rough Riders) 1-1 series (18-17 points) |
| 1942 | 1942 | IRFU | – | Season suspended due to World War II | | | | |
| 1943 | 1943 | IRFU | – | Season suspended due to World War II | | | | |
| 1944 | 1944 | IRFU | – | Season suspended due to World War II | | | | |
| 1945 | 1945 | IRFU†* | – | 2nd | 5 | 1 | 0 | Won IRFU Finals (Rough Riders) 1-1 series (33-18 points); Won Eastern Finals (Balmy Beach Beachers) 14-2; Won Grey Cup (Blue Bombers) 35-0 |
| 1946 | 1946 | IRFU†* | – | 2nd | 7 | 3 | 2 | Won IRFU Finals (Alouettes) 12-6; Won Eastern Finals (Balmy Beach Beachers) 22-12; Won Grey Cup (Blue Bombers) 28-6 |
| 1947 | 1947 | IRFU†* | – | 2nd | 7 | 4 | 1 | Won IRFU Finals (Rough Riders) 2-0 series (25-0 points); Won Eastern Finals (Trojans) 22-1; Won Grey Cup (Blue Bombers) 10-9 |
| 1948 | 1948 | IRFU | – | 3rd | 5 | 6 | 1 | |
| 1949 | 1949 | IRFU | – | 3rd | 5 | 7 | 0 | |
| 1950 | 1950 | IRFU†* | – | 2nd | 6 | 5 | 1 | Won IRFU Finals (Tiger-Cats) 1-1 series (35-19 points); Won Eastern Finals (Balmy Beach Beachers) 43-13; Won Grey Cup (Blue Bombers) 13-0 |
| 1951 | 1951 | IRFU | – | 3rd | 7 | 5 | 0 | Lost IRFU Semi-Finals (Tiger-Cats) 1-1 series (31-28 points) |
| 1952 | 1952 | IRFU†* | – | 2nd | 7 | 4 | 1 | Won IRFU Finals (Tiger-Cats) 2-1 series (45-40 points); Won Eastern Finals (Imperials) 34-15; Won Grey Cup (Eskimos) 21-11 |
| 1953 | 1953 | IRFU | – | 4th | 5 | 9 | 0 | |
| 1954 | 1954 | IRFU | – | 3rd | 6 | 8 | 0 | |
| 1955 | 1955 | IRFU | – | 3rd | 4 | 8 | 0 | Won Divisional Semi-Finals (Tiger-Cats) 32-28; Lost Divisional Finals (Alouettes) 38-36 |
| 1956 | 1956 | CFC | IRFU | 4th | 4 | 10 | 0 | |
| 1957 | 1957 | CFC | IRFU | 4th | 4 | 10 | 0 | |
| 1958 | 1958 | CFL | IRFU | 4th | 4 | 10 | 0 | |
| 1959 | 1959 | CFL | IRFU | 4th | 4 | 10 | 0 | |
| 1960 | 1960 | CFL | East | 1st^ | 10 | 4 | 0 | Lost IRFU Divisional Finals (Rough Riders) 2-0 series (54-41 points) |
| 1961 | 1961 | CFL | East | 3rd | 7 | 6 | 1 | Won East Divisional Semi-Finals (Rough Riders) 43-19; Lost East Divisional Finals (Tiger-Cats) 1-1 series (55-27 points) |
| 1962 | 1962 | CFL | East | 4th | 4 | 10 | 0 | |
| 1963 | 1963 | CFL | East | 4th | 3 | 11 | 0 | |
| 1964 | 1964 | CFL | East | 4th | 4 | 10 | 0 | |
| 1965 | 1965 | CFL | East | 4th | 3 | 11 | 0 | |
| 1966 | 1966 | CFL | East | 4th | 5 | 9 | 0 | |
| 1967 | 1967 | CFL | East | 3rd | 5 | 8 | 1 | Lost East Divisional Semi-Finals (Rough Riders) 38-22 |
| 1968 | 1968 | CFL | East | 2nd | 9 | 5 | 0 | Won East Divisional Semi-Finals (Tiger-Cats) 33-21; Lost East Divisional Finals (Rough Riders) 1-1 series (47-27 points) |
| 1969 | 1969 | CFL | East | 2nd | 10 | 4 | 0 | Won East Divisional Semi-Finals (Tiger-Cats) 15-9; Lost East Divisional Finals (Rough Riders) 1-1 series (46-35 points) |
| 1970 | 1970 | CFL | East | 2nd | 8 | 6 | 0 | Lost East Divisional Semi-Finals (Alouettes) 16-7 |
| 1971 | 1971 | CFL | East* | 1st^ | 10 | 4 | 0 | Won East Divisional Finals (Tiger-Cats) 1-0-1 series (40-25 points); Lost Grey Cup (Stampeders) 14-11 |
| 1972 | 1972 | CFL | East | 4th | 3 | 11 | 0 | |
| 1973 | 1973 | CFL | East | 2nd | 7 | 5 | 2 | Lost East Divisional Semi-Finals (Alouettes) 32-10 (OT) |
| 1974 | 1974 | CFL | East | 4th | 6 | 9 | 1 | |
| 1975 | 1975 | CFL | East | 4th | 5 | 10 | 1 | |
| 1976 | 1976 | CFL | East | 4th | 7 | 8 | 1 | |
| 1977 | 1977 | CFL | East | 3rd | 6 | 10 | 0 | Lost East Divisional Semi-Finals (Rough Riders) 21-16 |
| 1978 | 1978 | CFL | East | 4th | 4 | 12 | 0 | |
| 1979 | 1979 | CFL | East | 4th | 5 | 11 | 0 | |
| 1980 | 1980 | CFL | East | 4th | 6 | 10 | 0 | |
| 1981 | 1981 | CFL | East | 4th | 2 | 14 | 0 | |
| 1982 | 1982 | CFL | East* | 1st^ | 9 | 6 | 1 | Won East Divisional Finals (Rough Riders) 44-7; Lost Grey Cup (Eskimos) 32-16 |
| 1983 | 1983 | CFL† | East* | 1st^ | 12 | 4 | 0 | Won East Divisional Finals (Tiger-Cats) 41-36; Won Grey Cup (Lions) 18-17 |
| 1984 | 1984 | CFL | East | 1st^ | 9 | 6 | 1 | Lost East Divisional Finals (Tiger-Cats) 14-13 (OT) |
| 1985 | 1985 | CFL | East | 4th | 6 | 10 | 0 | |
| 1986 | 1986 | CFL | East | 1st^ | 10 | 8 | 0 | Lost East Divisional Finals (Tiger-Cats) 1-1 series (59-56 points) |
| 1987 | 1987 | CFL | East* | 2nd | 11 | 6 | 1 | Won East Divisional Semi-Finals (Tiger-Cats) 29-13; Won East Divisional Finals (Blue Bombers) 19-3; Lost Grey Cup (Eskimos) 38-36 |
| 1988 | 1988 | CFL | East | 1st^ | 14 | 4 | 0 | Lost East Divisional Finals (Blue Bombers) 27-11 |
| 1989 | 1989 | CFL | East | 2nd | 7 | 11 | 0 | Lost East Divisional Semi-Finals (Blue Bombers) 30-7 |
| 1990 | 1990 | CFL | East | 2nd | 10 | 8 | 0 | Won East Divisional Semi-Finals (Rough Riders) 34-25; Lost East Divisional Finals (Blue Bombers) 20-17 |
| 1991 | 1991 | CFL† | East* | 1st^ | 13 | 5 | 0 | Won East Divisional Finals (Blue Bombers) 42-3; Won Grey Cup (Stampeders) 36-21 |
| 1992 | 1992 | CFL | East | 4th | 6 | 12 | 0 | |
| 1993 | 1993 | CFL | East | 4th | 3 | 15 | 0 | |
| 1994 | 1994 | CFL | East | 3rd | 7 | 11 | 0 | Lost East Divisional Semi-Finals (Stallions) 34-15 |
| 1995 | 1995 | CFL | North | 7th | 4 | 14 | 0 | |
| 1996 | 1996 | CFL† | East* | 1st^ | 15 | 3 | 0 | Won East Divisional Finals (Alouettes) 43-7; Won Grey Cup (Eskimos) 43-37 |
| 1997 | 1997 | CFL† | East* | 1st^ | 15 | 3 | 0 | Won East Divisional Finals (Alouettes) 37-30; Won Grey Cup (Roughriders) 47-23 |
| 1998 | 1998 | CFL | East | 3rd | 9 | 9 | 0 | Lost East Divisional Semi-Finals (Alouettes) 41-28 |
| 1999 | 1999 | CFL | East | 3rd | 9 | 9 | 0 | Lost East Divisional Semi-Finals (Tiger-Cats) 27-6 |
| 2000 | 2000 | CFL | East | 4th | 7 | 10 | 1 | |
| 2001 | 2001 | CFL | East | 4th | 7 | 11 | 0 | |
| 2002 | 2002 | CFL | East | 2nd | 8 | 10 | 0 | Won East Divisional Semi-Finals (Roughriders) 24-14; Lost East Divisional Finals (Alouettes) 35-18 |
| 2003 | 2003 | CFL | East | 2nd | 9 | 9 | 0 | Won East Divisional Semi-Finals (Lions) 28-7; Lost East Divisional Finals (Alouettes) 30-26 |
| 2004 | 2004 | CFL† | East* | 2nd | 10 | 7 | 1 | Won East Divisional Semi-Finals (Tiger-Cats) 24-6; Won East Divisional Finals (Alouettes) 26-18; Won Grey Cup (Lions) 27-19 |
| 2005 | 2005 | CFL | East | 1st^ | 11 | 7 | 0 | Lost East Divisional Finals (Alouettes) 33-17 |
| 2006 | 2006 | CFL | East | 2nd | 10 | 8 | 0 | Won East Divisional Semi-Finals (Blue Bombers) 31-27; Lost East Divisional Finals (Alouettes) 33-24 |
| 2007 | 2007 | CFL | East | 1st^ | 11 | 7 | 0 | Lost East Divisional Finals (Blue Bombers) 19-9 |
| 2008 | 2008 | CFL | East | 3rd | 4 | 14 | 0 | |
| 2009 | 2009 | CFL | East | 4th | 3 | 15 | 0 | |
| 2010 | 2010 | CFL | East | 3rd | 9 | 9 | 0 | Won East Divisional Semi-Finals (Tiger-Cats) 16-13; Lost East Divisional Finals (Alouettes) 48-17 |
| 2011 | 2011 | CFL | East | 4th | 6 | 12 | 0 | |
| 2012 | 2012 | CFL† | East* | 2nd | 9 | 9 | 0 | Won East Divisional Semi-Finals (Eskimos) 42-26; Won East Divisional Finals (Alouettes) 27-20; Won Grey Cup (Stampeders) 35-22 |
| 2013 | 2013 | CFL | East | 1st^ | 11 | 7 | 0 | Lost East Divisional Finals (Tiger-Cats) 36-24 |
| 2014 | 2014 | CFL | East | 3rd | 8 | 10 | 0 | |
| 2015 | 2015 | CFL | East | 3rd | 10 | 8 | 0 | Lost East Divisional Semi-Finals (Tiger-Cats) 25-22 |
| 2016 | 2016 | CFL | East | 4th | 5 | 13 | 0 | |
| 2017 | 2017 | CFL† | East* | 1st^ | 9 | 9 | 0 | Won East Divisional Finals (Roughriders) 25-21; Won Grey Cup (Stampeders) 27-24 |
| 2018 | 2018 | CFL | East | 4th | 4 | 14 | 0 | |
| 2019 | 2019 | CFL | East | 3rd | 4 | 14 | 0 | |
| 2020 | 2020 | CFL | East | Season cancelled due to COVID-19 pandemic | | | | |
| 2021 (Note: The start of the regular season was delayed until August 2021 because of the COVID-19 pandemic, resulting in a shorted 14 game schedule.) | 2021 | CFL | East | 1st^ | 9 | 5 | 0 | Lost East Divisional Finals (Tiger-Cats) 27-19 |
| 2022 | 2022 | CFL† | East* | 1st^ | 11 | 7 | 0 | Won East Divisional Finals (Alouettes) 34-27; Won Grey Cup (Blue Bombers) 24-23 |
| 2023 | 2023 | CFL | East | 1st^ | 16 | 2 | 0 | Lost East Divisional Finals (Alouettes) 38-17 |
| 2024 | 2024 | CFL† | East* | 2nd | 10 | 8 | 0 | Won East Divisional Semi-Finals (Redblacks) 58-38; Won East Divisional Finals (Alouettes) 30-28; Won Grey Cup (Blue Bombers) 41-24 |
| 2025 | 2025 | CFL | East | 3rd | 5 | 13 | 0 | |
| 2026 | 2026 | CFL | East | 2nd | 9 | 9 | 0 | Lost East Divisional Semi-Finals (Blue Bombers) 25-22 |
| Regular Season Totals (1907–2026) (Note: Includes all games played since the 1907 founding of the IRFU, the precursor of the CFL East Division, excluding the 1941 season in which the club competed in the ERFU.) | | | | | 703 | 750 | 26 | |
| Playoff Totals (1907–2026) | | | | | 68 | 39 | 0 | |
| Grey Cup Totals (1909–2026) | | | | | 19 | 6 | | |
| Dominion Championship Totals (1884–1908) | | | | | 0 | 2 | | |
