= 1907 Dominion Championship =

Peterborough Club	Montreal Football Club
(1–1)	(5–1)
10	71
Head coach: Crowley	Head coach: Chaucer Elliott
	1	2	3	4	Total
Peterborough Club	6	4	0	0	10
Montreal Football Club	23	12	22	14	71
- Date: November 30, 1907
- Location: McGill University; Montreal, Quebec
- Referee: Russell Britton
- Attendance: 3,000

The 1907 Dominion Championship was a Canadian football game that was played on November 30, 1907 at McGill University in Montreal, Quebec that determined the Senior Rugby Football champion of Canada for the 1907 season. This was the first championship game to feature the newly created Interprovincial Rugby Football Union (IRFU) champion, which was the Montreal Football Club. Montreal defeated the Ontario Rugby Football Union (ORFU) champion Peterborough Club in a 71–10 blowout victory to win their second Canadian Championship. This was the eighth appearance in the title game for Montreal and the first and only appearance for Peterborough. Notably, referee Russell Britton admitted after the game that there was a scoring error when a touch-in-goal (one point) was given to Montreal when it should have counted as a try (five points). While the score should have been 75–10, it was officially recorded as 71–10. This was the highest scoring Dominion championship/Grey Cup in Canadian football history.

== Background ==
The Intercollegiate Union did not allow the CIRFU champion Ottawa College to play Montreal for the Dominion title, in solidarity with a decision made by the Canadian Amateur Athletic Union (CAAU). The CAAU alleged that IRFU players were professionals and would not allow college teams to play against them. The CAAU also decreed that they would ban any teams from playing an intercollegiate team that had also played against an IRFU team. A match had been scheduled for November 23, 1907 between Peterborough and Ottawa, but only if it were for Dominion honours. Because Peterborough intended on playing Montreal in a championship game if they won, and Ottawa could not play Montreal if they won, the match was cancelled. While a home-and-home series was considered, ultimately this sudden death game was scheduled for November 30 instead.
