= 1915 Toronto Argonauts season =

CFL team season

- Head coach: Billy Foulds/Warren Coryell
- Home stadium: Rosedale Field

Results
- Record: 3–2
- Division place: 2nd, IRFU
- Playoffs: Did not qualify

The 1915 Toronto Argonauts season was the 32nd season for the team since the franchise's inception in 1873. The team finished in second place in the Interprovincial Rugby Football Union with a 3–2 record and failed to qualify for the playoffs.

== Regular season ==
=== Standings ===
Interprovincial Rugby Football Union
Team	GP	W	L	T	PF	PA	Pts
Hamilton Tigers	6	6	0	0	125	23	12
Toronto Argonauts	5	3	2	0	69	49	6
Ottawa Rough Riders	5	2	3	0	54	50	4
Montreal Football Club	6	0	6	0	10	136	0

=== Schedule ===
Week	Date	Opponent	Final score	Record
1	Oct 9	Hamilton Tigers	L 22–5	0–1–0
2	Oct 16	@ Hamilton Tigers	L 17–5	0–2–0
3	Oct 23	Ottawa Rough Riders	W 17–9	1–2–0
4	Oct 30	@ Montreal Football Club	W 10–0	2–2–0
5	Nov 6	@ Ottawa Rough Riders	W 19–15*	2–2–0
6	Nov 13	Montreal Football Club	W 28–1	3–2–0

(*) The November 6 game won by Toronto over Ottawa was called because of darkness and protested by Ottawa. IRFU executives upheld the protest and declared the game no-contest.
