= 1909 in Canadian football =

The 1909 Canadian football season was the 18th season of organized play since the Canadian Rugby Union (CRU) was founded in 1892 and the 26th season since the creation of the founding leagues, the Ontario Rugby Football Union (ORFU) and the Quebec Rugby Football Union (QRFU) in 1883. The season concluded with Toronto Varsity defeating Toronto Parkdale in the 1909 Dominion Championship game. This year was notable for being the first year that the champions were awarded the Grey Cup trophy, although it was not delivered to the University of Toronto until March 1910.

== Canadian football news in 1909 ==
Lord Earl Grey, the Governor General of Canada, donated a trophy to be awarded for the Dominion Football Championship of Canada. Only teams registered with the Canadian Rugby Union were eligible to compete for the trophy. The championship game was played in Toronto at Rosedale Field on December 4 between the University of Toronto and the Toronto Parkdale Canoe Club with the University of Toronto winning 26–6 before 3,807 fans. Hugh Gall kicked a record eight singles in the game for the U of T. The gross revenue was $2,616.40.

On December 11, following an invitation from the New York Herald newspaper, the Hamilton Tigers and Ottawa Rough Riders played an exhibition game of Canadian football in New York City at Van Cortland Park. The Tigers won 11–6 before 15,000 fans.

Saskatchewan Rugby Football League did not play in 1909.

== Regular season ==
=== Final regular season standings ===
Note: GP = Games Played, W = Wins, L = Losses, T = Ties, PF = Points For, PA = Points Against, Pts = Points

**Interprovincial Rugby Football Union**
Team	GP	W	L	T	PF	PA	Pts
**Hamilton Tigers**	6	5	1	0	111	22	10
**Ottawa Rough Riders**	6	5	1	0	76	71	10
Toronto Argonauts	6	1	5	0	54	93	2
Montreal Football Club	6	1	5	0	36	91	2

Ontario Rugby Football Union
Team	GP	W	L	T	PF	PA	Pts
**Toronto Amateur Athletic Club**	4	3	1	0	51	30	6
**Toronto Parkdale Canoe Club**	4	3	1	0	92	20	6
Peterboro	4	0	4	0	19	112	0

**Intercollegiate Rugby Football Union**
Team	GP	W	L	T	PF	PA	Pts
**Toronto**	6	6	0	0	166	27	12
Queen's	6	3	3	0	84	63	6
McGill	6	2	4	0	75	56	4
Ottawa	6	1	5	0	31	179	2

*Bold text means that they have clinched the playoffs

Manitoba Rugby Football Union
Team	GP	W	L	T	PF	PA	Pts
St.John's Rugby Football Club	4	3	1	0	38	35	6
Winnipeg Rowing Club	4	1	3	0	35	38	2

Calgary Rugby Football Union
Team	GP	W	L	T	PF	PA	Pts
Calgary Tigers	3	3	0	0	55	5	6
Calgary YMCA	3	1	2	0	18	49	2
Hillhurst Hornets	2	0	2	0	5	24	0

== League Champions ==
Football Union	League Champion
IRFU	Ottawa Rough Riders
CIRFU	University of Toronto
ORFU	Toronto Parkdale
MRFU	St.John's Rugby Football Club
ARFL	Calgary Tigers

== Grey Cup Playoffs ==
Note: All dates in 1909

=== Alberta Rugby Football League Playoffs ===
ARFL Finals Games 1 & 2
Date	Away	Home
October 25	Calgary Tigers 25	Edmonton Esquimaux 1
October 30	Edmonton Esquimaux 6	Calgary Tigers 23

- Calgary wins the total-point series 48-7.

=== IRFU Playoff ===
November 20 IRFU Playoff: Rosedale Field – Toronto, Ontario
Ottawa Rough Riders 14	Hamilton Tigers 8

- Ottawa advances to the East Semi-Final.

=== ORFU Playoff ===
November 20 ORFU Playoff: Varsity Grounds – Toronto, Ontario
Toronto Parkdale 8	Toronto Amateur Athletic Club 3

- Toronto Parkdale advances to the Grey Cup.

=== Dominion Semi-Final ===
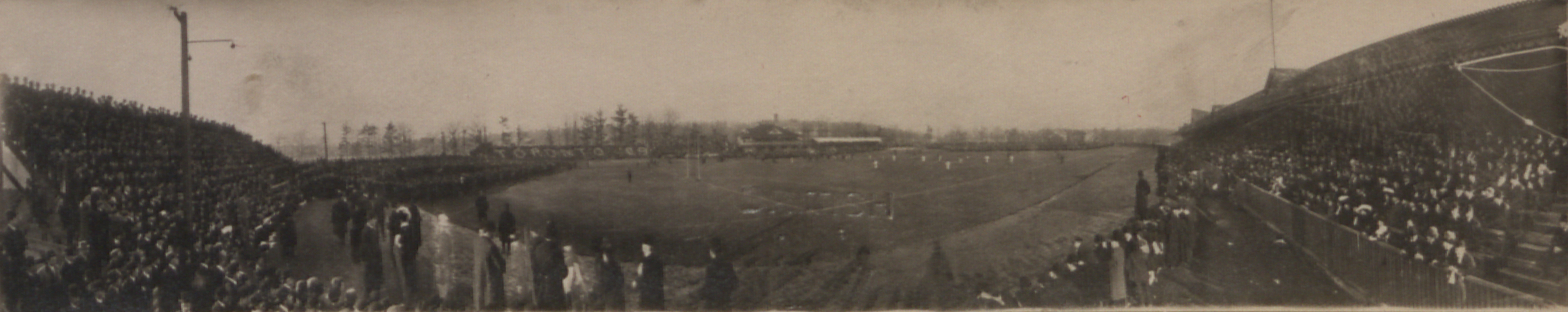
Panoramic photograph of the Grey Cup playoffs between the Ottawa Rough Riders and Toronto Varsity, 27 November 1909

November 27 Dominion Semi-Final: Rosedale Field – Toronto, Ontario
Ottawa Rough Riders 7	Toronto Varsity 31

- Toronto Varsity advances to the Grey Cup.

== Playoff Bracket ==
IRFU Playoff
IRFU	Ottawa Rough Riders	14
IRFU	Hamilton Tigers	8

Semi-Finals
CIRFU	University of Toronto	37
IRFU	Ottawa Rough Riders	7
ORFU	Toronto Parkdale	9
ORFU	Toronto Amateur Athletic Club	3

Dominion Final
CIRFU	University of Toronto	26
ORFU	Toronto Parkdale	6

== Grey Cup Championship ==
December 4 1st Annual Grey Cup Game: Rosedale Field – Toronto, Ontario
Toronto Varsity 26	Toronto Parkdale Canoe Club 6
Toronto Varsity are the 1909 Grey Cup Champions
