= 1901 Toronto Argonauts season =

CFL team season

- Head coach: Ernest "Pud" Kent (captain)
- Home stadium: Varsity Athletic Field and Rosedale Field

Results
- Record: 5–1
- Division place: 1st, ORFU senior series
- Playoffs: Lost Dominion Championship

The 1901 Toronto Argonauts season was the Argonaut Football Club's fourth season of organized league play since joining the Ontario Rugby Football Union in 1898. The team won the first league championship in club history, finishing in first place in the senior series of the ORFU with five wins and one loss. The Argos also defeated the University of Toronto, that season's intercollegiate champions, in a two-game series for the city championship.

In their first trip to the Dominion championship the Argonauts were beaten 18-3 in Montreal by Ottawa College, champions of the Quebec Rugby Football Union, seven days after the two teams had played to a 12–12 tie.

== Regular season ==
=== Standings ===
Ontario Rugby Football Union (senior series)
Team	GP	W	L	T	PF	PA	Pts
Toronto Argonauts	6	5	1	0	64	27	10
Ottawa Rough Riders	6	4	2	0	111	33	8
Hamilton Tigers	6	2	4	0	39	72	4
Kingston Granites	6	1	5	0	8	89	2

=== Schedule ===
Game	Date	Opponent	Result	Record	Venue	Attendance
1	October 5	at Hamilton Tigers	W 8–6	1–0	Hamilton AAA Grounds	1,000
2	October 12	at Kingston Granites	L 0–2	1–1	Kingston AAA Grounds	
3	October 19	University of Toronto*	W 18–12	1–1	Varsity Athletic Field	1,500
4	October 26	Kingston Granites	W 23–1	2–1	Varsity Athletic Field	1,500
5	November 2	Ottawa Rough Riders	W 13–10	3–1	Rosedale Field	1,800
6	November 9	Hamilton Tigers	W 19–8	4–1	Varsity Athletic Field	
7	November 16	at Ottawa Rough Riders	W 2–1	5–1	Varsity Oval	2,500
9	November 28	University of Toronto*	W 5–1	5–1	Rosedale Field	2,000

- Games against the University of Toronto were for the City Championship

== Postseason ==
Round	Date	Opponent	Result	Record	Venue	Attendance
CRU Dominion Championship	November 23	Ottawa College	T 12–12	0–0–1	Montreal AAA Grounds	2,500
CRU Dominion Championship (replay)	November 30	Ottawa College	L 3–18	0–1–1	Montreal AAA Grounds	2,000
