= 1900 Toronto Argonauts season =

CFL team season

- Head coach: Ralph Ripley
- Home stadium: Rosedale Field

Results
- Record: 4–2
- Division place: 1st, ORFU senior series
- Playoffs: Lost League Tie-Break

The 1900 Toronto Argonauts season was the club's 15th season of organized league competition since its inception in 1873. The team finished in a first place tie with the Ottawa Rough Riders in the senior series of the Ontario Rugby Football Union with four wins and two losses, but failed to win the league championship after losing to the Riders in the resulting tie-break game in Toronto.

== Regular season ==
=== Standings ===
Ontario Rugby Football Union (senior series)
Team	GP	W	L	T	PF	PA	Pts
Ottawa Rough Riders	6	4	2	0	89	75	8
Toronto Argonauts	6	4	2	0	82	42	8
Kingston Granites	6	3	3	0	45	93	6
Hamilton Tigers	6	1	5	0	12	68	2

=== Schedule ===
Game	Date	Opponent	Result	Record	Venue
1	September 29	vs. Hamilton Tigers	W 21–1	1–0	Varsity Athletic Field
2	October 6	vs. Kingston Granites	W 14–1	2–0	Rosedale Field
3	October 13	at Ottawa Rough Riders	L 8–15	2–1	Varsity Oval
4	October 17	at Hamilton Tigers	W 27–12	3–1	Hamilton AAA Grounds
5	October 27	at Kingston Granites	L 7–9	3–2	Kingston AAA Grounds
6	November 3	vs. Ottawa Rough Riders	W 5–4	4–2	Rosedale Field

== Postseason ==
Round	Date	Opponent	Result	Record	Venue
ORFU Championship Tie-Break	November 10	vs. Ottawa Rough Riders	L 12–20	0–1	Rosedale Field
