= 1909 Ottawa Rough Riders season =

Canadian football team season

- Head coach: Tom Clancy
- Home stadium: Lansdowne Park

Results
- Record: 5–1
- League place: 2nd, IRFU
- Playoffs: Lost Eastern Final

The 1909 Ottawa Rough Riders finished in second place in the Interprovincial Rugby Football Union with a 5–1 record and qualified for the playoffs for the second straight year. They defeated the Hamilton Tigers in a league playoff, avenging last year's loss, but lost to the Toronto Varsity Blues in the Eastern Final.

== Regular season ==
=== Standings ===
Interprovincial Rugby Football Union
Team	GP	W	L	T	PF	PA	Pts
Hamilton Tigers	6	5	1	0	111	22	10
Ottawa Rough Riders	6	5	1	0	76	71	10
Toronto Argonauts	6	1	5	0	54	93	2
Montreal Football Club	6	1	5	0	36	91	2

=== Schedule ===
Game	Date	Opponent	Results	
Game	Date	Opponent	Score	Record
1	Oct 2	vs. Montreal Football Club	W 25–14	1–0
2	Oct 9	vs. Hamilton Tigers	W 7–5	2–0
3	Oct 16	at Montreal Football Club	W 5–3	3–0
4	Oct 23	vs. Toronto Argonauts	W 20–10	4–0
5	Oct 30	at Toronto Argonauts	W 14–9	5–0
6	Nov 6	at Hamilton Tigers	L 5–30	5–1

== Postseason ==
Game	Date	Opponent	Results	
Game	Date	Opponent	Score	Record
IRFU Playoff	Nov 20	at Hamilton Tigers	W 14–8	1–0
Eastern Final	Nov 27	at Toronto Varsity Blues	L 7–31	1–1

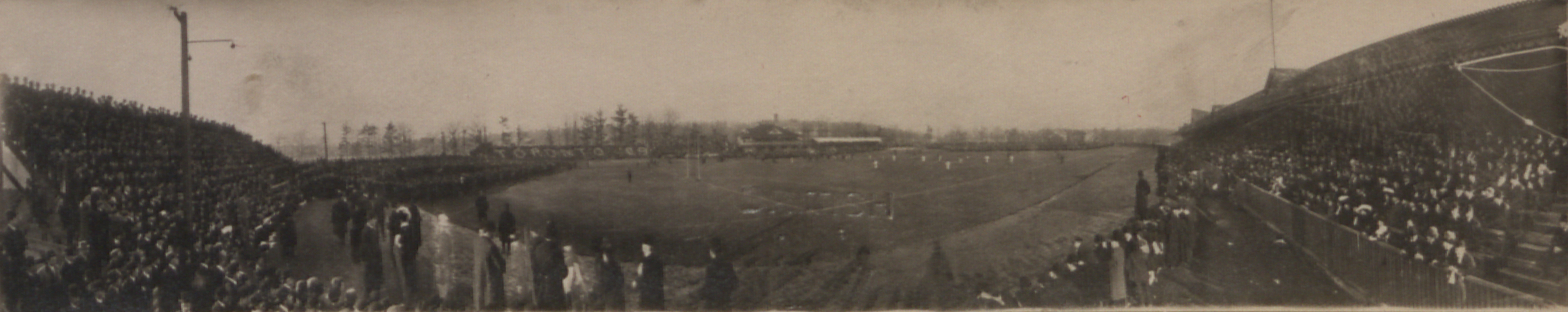
Panoramic photograph of the Grey Cup playoffs between the Ottawa Rough Riders and the Toronto Varsity Blues, 27 November 1909
