= 1899 Toronto Argonauts season =

CFL team season

- Head coach: Ralph Ripley
- Home stadium: Rosedale Field

Results
- Record: 2–4
- Division place: 3rd, ORFU senior series
- Playoffs: did not qualify

The 1899 Toronto Argonauts season was the club's second season as a member club of the Ontario Rugby Football Union. The team finished in third place in the Senior Championship of the ORFU with two wins and four losses, and failed to qualify for the Dominion playoffs. However the Argos' 9-0 victory over the University of Toronto on October 21 won them the City Championship, for which they received the Wilson Trophy, the first trophy to be won by the Argos in their history.

The Argos played two non-league games during the 1899 season, defeating the University of Toronto 9-0 at Varsity Athletic Field on October 21 to claim the city championship, and losing 23-19 at Rosedale Field on November 4 to an Ireland touring side, a match played half under Canadian rules and half under rugby rules.

== Regular season ==
=== Standings ===
Ontario Rugby Football Union (senior series)
Team	GP	W	L	T	PF	PA	Pts
Kingston Granites	6	5	1	0	80	38	10
Ottawa Rough Riders	6	5	1	0	70	36	10
Toronto Argonauts	6	2	4	0	51	91	4
Hamilton Tigers	6	0	6	0	13	59	0

=== Schedule ===
Week	Game	Date	Opponent	Result	Record
1	1	October 7	vs. Hamilton Tigers	W 11–6	1–0
2	2	October 14	at Ottawa Rough Riders	L 5–28	1–1
3	3	October 18	at Kingston Granites	L 6–27	1–2
4	4	October 28	at Hamilton Tigers	W 12–0	2–2
5	Bye				
6	5	November 11	vs. Ottawa Rough Riders	L 8–15	2–3
7	6	November 18	vs. Kingston Granites	L 9–16	2–4
