= 1899 ORFU Championship =

1899 Ontario Rugby Football Union Championship
- Event: ORFU Championship
Kingston Granites	Ottawa Rough Riders
8	0
- Date: November 25, 1899
- Venue: Rosedale Field, Toronto
- Referee: J. Ridler Wylie
- Attendance: 1,000

The 1899 Ontario Rugby Football Union Championship was contested between the Kingston Granites and the Ottawa Rough Riders. The championship game was held at Rosedale Field in Toronto on November 25, 1899.

== Background ==
In 1899, the Granites joined the ORFU, replacing the Osgoode Hall team which left the league to join the Quebec Rugby Football Union (QRFU). This marked Kingston's first season competing for the ORFU title. The ORFU Executive officially admitted Kingston to the senior series during a league meeting held in Toronto in September 1899. The league schedule was drawn up at that meeting, with several dates reserved in case of a potential exhibition against an Irish rugby team touring Canada.

At the start of the season, some observers questioned the long-term stability of the ORFU, citing ongoing league reorganizations and fluctuating team strength. Kingston, in particular, was viewed as an underdog entering their first ORFU season, with concerns raised about whether they could field a competitive roster.

== Road to the Championship ==
The 1899 ORFU regular season featured four teams: the Kingston Granites, Ottawa Rough Riders, Toronto Argonauts, and Hamilton Tigers. Both Kingston and Ottawa finished the regular season tied for first place with identical 5–1 records, resulting in a championship playoff to determine the league title.

The Ottawa Rough Riders entered the championship as favourites, while the Kingston Granites were widely considered underdogs.

=== ORFU Regular Season Standings ===
Team	GP	W	L	T	PF	PA	Pts
Kingston Granites	6	5	1	0	80	38	10
Ottawa Rough Riders	6	5	1	0	70	36	10
Toronto Argonauts	6	2	4	0	51	91	4
Hamilton Tigers	6	0	6	0	13	59	0

The 1899 Canadian football season also featured competition in other regional unions. In the Quebec Rugby Football Union (QRFU), Ottawa College defeated Brockville Football Club to win the QRFU title. In the Manitoba Rugby Football Union (MRFU), St. John’s Rugby Football Club won the league championship. The Canadian Intercollegiate Rugby Football Union (CIRFU) was won by the University of Toronto.

=== 1899 League Champions ===
Football Union	Champion
CIRFU	University of Toronto
ORFU	Kingston Granites
QRFU	Ottawa College
MRFU	St. John's Rugby Football Club

== Controversy ==
Before the game, Ottawa filed a formal protest concerning the eligibility of several Kingston players. The Granites included multiple players from Queen’s University, such as Elliott, Carr-Harris, Etherington, and DeMilt, who were not regular members of the club. Ottawa argued that this violated ORFU eligibility rules. The protest was submitted to referee J. Ridler Wylie, but the game proceeded as scheduled without changes to the Kingston roster.

Following the championship match, Ottawa formally filed a renewed protest regarding Kingston’s use of Queen’s players. Kingston captain E.C. Elliott defended his team, noting that Ottawa also utilized players from outside their city limits, and argued that both teams followed similar practices in assembling their rosters. The ORFU Executive was scheduled to meet to consider Ottawa's protest, but ultimately no changes were made to the championship result.

== Game summary ==
Approximately 1,000 spectators attended the final at Rosedale Field. The match was defensively oriented, with most of the play consisting of scrimmages, short gains, and limited open-field action. Kingston controlled possession and scored all of its points in the first half.

In the lead-up to the game, Ottawa was considered strong at the forward positions but had concerns about its back division depth. Several key players missed practices, and Boileau was ruled out with a knee injury.

Playing with the wind advantage, Kingston forced Ottawa to concede two early rouges. Ottawa later missed a free-kick attempt from 15 yards, allowing Kingston to maintain possession. Kingston extended its lead following a passing sequence between Dalton, Southam, and Palmer that resulted in a converted try.

Ottawa struggled with ball control, committing multiple fumbles and failing to capitalize on scoring opportunities inside Kingston’s territory, including a possession near the goal line late in the first half.

=== Scoring summary ===
Team	Scoring play	Points
Kingston Granites	Rouge (Hamilton)	1
Kingston Granites	Rouge (Hamilton)	1
Kingston Granites	Try (Dalton)	4
Kingston Granites	Conversion goal (Hamilton)	2
Total		8
Ottawa Rough Riders	No scoring	0

=== Final score ===
- Kingston Granites: 8
- Ottawa Rough Riders: 0

== Team lineups ==
Kingston Granites

- Back: Reyner
- Halves: Curtis, Hamilton
- Wings: Elliott, Freeborn, Devitt
- Quarter: Dalton (captain)
- Scrimmages: Hazlett, Carr-Harris, Sillo
- Forwards: Palmer, Metcalfe, Ross, Etherington, Young

Ottawa Rough Riders

- Back: Wilson
- Halves: McGee, Southam
- Wings: Beaulieu, M. Walters, Pulford
- Quarter: Nolan
- Scrimmages: Boucher, Kennedy, Buchanan
- Forwards: Austin, Hal Walters, Rayside, Jory, LaFleur

== Officials ==
- Referee: J. Ridler Wylie
- Umpire: C. E. Martin
- Goal judges: T. Powers, W. S. Kennan
- Touch-line judges: E. S. DuMoulin, V. E. Henderson
- Timekeepers: "Bush" Thompson, D. M. Cameron

== Aftermath ==
Following the match, Ottawa's protest regarding Kingston's use of Queen’s University players was not upheld. The Kingston Granites were officially recognized as the 1899 ORFU champions. The eligibility dispute reflected the player movement common in early Canadian rugby football prior to the introduction of stricter amateur and club-based eligibility rules. The controversy also fueled ongoing debates over professionalism versus amateurism in Canadian football. Kingston residents strongly defended the Granites and raised funds to cover potential legal expenses. Ottawa newspapers, while protesting the eligibility issue, also acknowledged Kingston's strong on-field performance during the match.
