= 1970 Ottawa Rough Riders season =

Canadian football team season

- Owner: David Loeb
- General manager: Frank Clair
- Head coach: Jack Gotta
- Home stadium: Lansdowne Park

Results
- Record: 4–10
- Division place: 4th, East
- Playoffs: Did not qualify

The 1970 Ottawa Rough Riders finished the season in fourth place in the Eastern Conference with a 4–10 record in their first season without Frank Clair as head coach after he served 14 seasons in that capacity. Jack Gotta, who was an assistant with Ottawa from 1967 to 1969 became head coach. The Rough Riders finished the season out of the playoffs and failed to defend their back-to-back Grey Cup titles.

== Preseason ==
Week	Date	Opponent	Result	Record
A	July 8	at Toronto Argonauts	L 9–28	0–1
A	July 13	vs. Calgary Stampeders	L 17–26	0–2
B	July 20	vs. Montreal Alouettes	L 8–15	0–2
C	July 23	at Hamilton Tiger-Cats	W 27–20	1–3

== Regular season ==
=== Standings ===
Eastern Football Conference
Team	GP	W	L	T	PF	PA	Pts
Hamilton Tiger-Cats	14	8	5	1	292	279	17
Toronto Argonauts	14	8	6	0	329	290	16
Montreal Alouettes	14	7	6	1	246	279	15
Ottawa Rough Riders	14	4	10	0	255	279	8

=== Schedule ===
Week	Date	Opponent	Result	Record
1	July 29	vs. Hamilton Tiger-Cats	L 15–17	0–1
2	Bye			
3	Aug 11	vs. Saskatchewan Roughriders	L 1–24	0–2
4	Bye			
5	Aug 25	at Edmonton Eskimos	W 31–23	1–2
5	Aug 27	at BC Lions	L 30–32	1–3
6	Sept 2	vs. Montreal Alouettes	W 31–7	2–3
6	Sept 7	vs. Toronto Argonauts	L 21–37	2–4
7	Sept 13	at Toronto Argonauts	L 25–30	2–5
8	Sept 19	vs. Calgary Stampeders	W 9–1	3–5
9	Sept 27	at Montreal Alouettes	L 15–16	3–6
10	Oct 3	vs. Winnipeg Blue Bombers	L 0–15	3–7
11	Oct 12	at Hamilton Tiger-Cats	L 17–24	3–8
12	Oct 17	vs. Hamilton Tiger-Cats	L 15–22	3–9
13	Oct 24	at Montreal Alouettes	W 28–12	4–9
14	Oct 31	at Toronto Argonauts	L 17–19	4–10

=== Player stats ===
==== Defence ====
Player	Games Played	Interceptions	Yards	Average	Touchdowns
Irby Augustine	10	2	47	23.5	0

=== Awards and honours ===
- Al Marcelin, Defensive Back, CFL All-Star
