= 1898 Toronto Argonauts season =

CFL team season

- Head coach: Joe Wright
- Home stadium: Rosedale Field

Results
- Record: 0–6
- Division place: 4th, ORFU Senior Championship
- Playoffs: did not qualify

The 1898 Toronto Argonauts season was the club's first season as a member club of the Ontario Rugby Football Union. The team finished in fourth place in the Senior Championship of the ORFU with six losses, and failed to qualify for the Dominion playoffs.

== Regular season ==
=== Standings ===
Ontario Rugby Football Union (Senior Championship)
Team	GP	W	L	T	PF	PA	Pts
Ottawa Rough Riders	6	6	0	0	170	20	12
Hamilton Tigers	6	4	2	0	77	48	8
Osgoode Hall	6	2	4	0	60	118	4
Toronto Argonauts	6	0	6	0	19	140	0

=== Schedule ===
Game	Date	Opponent	Results		Venue	Attendance
Game	Date	Opponent	Score	Record	Venue	Attendance
1	Sat, Oct 8	at Hamilton Tigers	L 4–24	0–1	Hamilton AAA Grounds	1,500
2	Sat, Oct 15	at Osgoode Hall	L 0–19	0–2	Varsity Athletic Field	800
3	Sat, Oct 22	vs. Ottawa Rough Riders	L 1–18	0–3	Rosedale Field	150
4	Sat, Oct 29	vs. Osgoode Hall	L 8–17	0–4	Rosedale Field	
5	Sat, Nov 5	at Ottawa Rough Riders	L 6–48	0–5	Metropolitan Grounds	"small"
6	Sat, Nov 12	vs. Hamilton Tigers	L 0–14	0–6	Varsity Athletic Field	800
