= 1921 Toronto Argonauts season =

CFL team season

- Head coach: Sinc McEvenue
- Home stadium: Varsity Stadium (cap 10,500)

Results
- Record: 6–0
- Division place: 1st, IRFU
- Playoffs: Won Grey Cup

The 1921 Toronto Argonauts season was the 35th season for the team since the franchise's inception in 1873. The team finished in first place in the Interprovincial Rugby Football Union with a perfect 6–0 record and qualified for the playoffs for the second consecutive season. The Argonauts defeated the defending champion Toronto Varsity Blues in the Eastern Semi-Final before winning the Eastern Final over the Toronto Parkdale Canoe Club. The Argonauts faced the Edmonton Eskimos in the 9th Grey Cup game, which was the first time that a Western Canada Rugby Football Union team competed for the Cup. The Argonauts completed their first and only perfect season and won the franchise's second Grey Cup championship by a score of 23-0 in the first ever shut out in a Grey Cup game.

== Regular season ==
=== Standings ===
Interprovincial Rugby Football Union
| Team | GP | W | L | T | PF | PA | Pts |
|---|---|---|---|---|---|---|---|
| Toronto Argonauts | 6 | 6 | 0 | 0 | 167 | 35 | 10 |
| Hamilton Tigers | 6 | 3 | 3 | 0 | 102 | 79 | 6 |
| Ottawa Senators | 6 | 3 | 3 | 0 | 77 | 71 | 6 |
| Montreal AAA Winged Wheelers | 6 | 0 | 6 | 0 | 29 | 190 | 0 |

=== Schedule ===
| Game | Date | Opponent | Results | | Venue | Attendance |
| Game | Date | Opponent | Score | Record | Venue | Attendance |
|---|---|---|---|---|---|---|
| 1 | Sat, Oct 1 | vs. Hamilton Tigers | W 27–4 | 1–0 | Varsity Stadium | 7,500 |
| 2 | Sat, Oct 8 | at Montreal AAA Winged Wheelers | W 40–5 | 2–0 | Stade Percival-Molson | 3,000 |
| 3 | Sat, Oct 15 | vs. Montreal AAA Winged Wheelers | W 42–0 | 3–0 | Varsity Stadium | 3,500 |
| 4 | Sat, Oct 22 | at Hamilton Tigers | W 19–18 | 4–0 | Hamilton AAA Grounds | |
| 5 | Sat, Oct 29 | at Ottawa Senators | W 11–3 | 5–0 | Lansdowne Park | 9,000 |
| 6 | Sat, Nov 12 | vs. Ottawa Senators | W 28–5 | 6–0 | Varsity Stadium | 3,000 |

== Postseason ==
| Round | Date | Opponent | Results | | Venue | Attendance |
| Round | Date | Opponent | Score | Record | Venue | Attendance |
|---|---|---|---|---|---|---|
| Eastern Semi-Final | Sat, Nov 19 | vs. Toronto Varsity Blues | W 20–12 | 1–0 | Varsity Stadium | 12,568 |
| Eastern Final | Sat, Nov 26 | vs. Toronto Parkdale Paddlers | W 16–8 | 2–0 | Varsity Stadium | 9,000 |
| Grey Cup | Sat, Dec 3 | vs. Edmonton Eskimos | W 23–0 | 3–0 | Varsity Stadium | 9,558 |

=== Grey Cup ===
December 3 @ Varsity Stadium (Attendance: 9,558)

| Team | Q1 | Q2 | Q3 | Q4 | Total |
|---|---|---|---|---|---|
| Edmonton Eskimos | 0 | 0 | 0 | 0 | 0 |
| Toronto Argonauts | 10 | 7 | 4 | 2 | 23 |
