= 1914 Toronto Argonauts season =

CFL team season

- Head coach: Billy Foulds
- Home stadium: Rosedale Field

Results
- Record: 5–1
- Division place: 1st, IRFU
- Playoffs: Won Grey Cup

The 1914 Toronto Argonauts season was the 31st season for the team since the franchise's inception in 1873. The team finished in second place in the Interprovincial Rugby Football Union with a 5–1 record after losing the season series to the Hamilton Tigers, who finished in first place with the same record. The Argonauts would play the Tigers in a two-game playoff series and after tying the first game, they would win the second, becoming the IRFU champions. After defeating the Hamilton Rowing Club in the Eastern Final, the Argonauts advanced to the 6th Grey Cup, which was their third appearance in the championship game in four years. The Argonauts won their first national championship in franchise history over the Toronto Varsity Blues by a score of 14-2. They became the first team to win the Grey Cup after finishing second in their union, after all previous winners had finished first in their respective leagues.

== Regular season ==
=== Standings ===
Interprovincial Rugby Football Union
Team	GP	W	L	T	PF	PA	Pts
Hamilton Tigers	6	5	1	0	105	34	10
Toronto Argonauts	6	5	1	0	145	47	10
Montreal Football Club	6	2	4	0	62	108	4
Ottawa Rough Riders	6	0	6	0	39	162	0

=== Schedule ===
Week	Date	Opponent	Location	Final score	Record
1	Oct 10	Hamilton Tigers	Rosedale Field	L 20–5	0–1–0
2	Oct 17	@ Hamilton Tigers	Hamilton AAA Grounds	W 7–5	1–1–0
3	Oct 24	@ Montreal AAA Winged Wheelers	Percival Molson Memorial Stadium	W 23–13	2–1–0
4	Oct 31	Ottawa Rough Riders	Rosedale Field	W 30–2	3–1–0
5	Nov 7	@ Ottawa Rough Riders	Lansdowne Park	W 47–4	4–1–0
6	Nov 14	Montreal AAA Winged Wheelers	Rosedale Field	W 33–3	5–1–0

== Postseason ==
Game	Date	Opponent	Location	Final score
IRFU Tie-Break	Nov 21	Hamilton Tigers	Hamilton AAA Grounds	T 9–9
IRFU Tie-Break (replay)	Nov 29	Hamilton Tigers	Varsity Stadium	W 11–4
Eastern Final	Dec 2	Hamilton Rowing Club	Rosedale Field	W 16–14
Grey Cup	Dec 5	Toronto Varsity Blues	Varsity Stadium	W 14–2

=== Grey Cup ===
December 5 @ Varsity Stadium (Attendance: 10,500)

Team	Q1	Q2	Q3	Q4	Total
Toronto Argonauts	6	8	0	0	14
Toronto Varsity Blues	0	0	2	0	2
