= 1970 Hamilton Tiger-Cats season =

Season of Canadian Football League team the Hamilton Tiger-Cats

- Head coach: Joe Restic
- Home stadium: Civic Stadium

Results
- Record: 8–5–1
- Division place: 1st, East
- Playoffs: Lost Eastern Finals
- Team MOP: Tommy Joe Coffey
- Team MOC: Bill Danychuk

The 1970 Hamilton Tiger-Cats season was the 13th season for the team in the Canadian Football League (CFL) and their 21st overall. The Tiger-Cats finished in first place in the Eastern Conference with an 8–5–1 record, but lost the Eastern Finals to the Montreal Alouettes.

== Roster ==
1970 Hamilton Tiger-Cats roster
Quarterbacks: Wally Gabler; John Manel; Running backs: Dave Fleming; Receivers: Tommy Joe Coffey WR/K; Offensive linemen: Jon Hohman G	Defensive linemen: Lonnie Maich DE; Linebackers: Mike Strofolino; Defensive backs: Paul Johnson DB; Special teams: Joe Zuger P/QB	Injured List 6-Game Injured List	Practice Roster Suspended Active, Injured, Six-Game, Practice Roster, Suspended

== Regular season ==
=== Season standings ===
Eastern Football Conference
Team	GP	W	L	T	PF	PA	Pts
Hamilton Tiger-Cats	14	8	5	1	292	279	17
Toronto Argonauts	14	8	6	0	329	290	16
Montreal Alouettes	14	7	6	1	246	279	15
Ottawa Rough Riders	14	4	10	0	255	279	8

=== Season schedule ===
Week	Date	Opponent	Final score	Record
1	July 29	at Ottawa Rough Riders	W 17–15	1–0
2	Aug 8	vs. Saskatchewan Roughriders	L 22–23	1–1
3	Aug 13	at Toronto Argonauts	L 3–29	1–2
4	Aug 22	vs. Winnipeg Blue Bombers	W 27–6	2–2
6	Sept 7	vs. Montreal Alouettes	W 17–12	3–2
7	Sept 12	at Montreal Alouettes	L 23–38	3–3
8	Sept 16	vs. Calgary Stampeders	W 39–18	4–3
9	Sept 23	at BC Lions	W 26–14	5–3
9	Sept 26	at Edmonton Eskimos	L 13–34	5–4
10	Oct 4	vs. Toronto Argonauts	L 14–33	5–5
11	Oct 12	vs. Ottawa Rough Riders	W 24–17	6–5
12	Oct 17	at Ottawa Rough Riders	W 22–15	7–5
13	Oct 25	vs. Toronto Argonauts	W 27–7	8–5
14	Nov 1	at Montreal Alouettes	T 18–18	8–5–1

== Post-season ==
Round	Date	Opponent	Result	Record	Venue	Attendance
Eastern Final #1	Nov 15	at Montreal Alouettes	L 22–32	0–1		
Eastern Final #2	Nov 21	vs. Montreal Alouettes	L 4–11	0–2		

== Awards and honours ==
- Tommy Joe Coffey, CFL All-Star
- Angelo Mosca, CFL All-Star
