= 1904 Toronto Argonauts season =

CFL team season

- Home stadium: Rosedale Field

Results
- Record: 2–2
- Division place: 1st, ORFU senior league, Dist. 1
- Playoffs: Lost District Tie-Break Semi-Final

The 1904 Toronto Argonauts season was the club's 18th season of organized league play since its inception in 1873. The team finished in a three-way tie for first place in District 1 of the senior series of the Ontario Rugby Football Union with two wins and two losses, and lost the resulting tie-break semi-final game to the Toronto Rugby Club.

== Regular season ==
For the 1904 season, the ORFU senior series was configured into two three-team districts, the champions of which faced each other in a playoff to determine the league champions. By virtue of tie-break victories over the Argonauts and Peterborough, the Toronto Rugby Club were crowned District 1 champions.

=== Standings ===
Ontario Rugby Football Union (senior series), District 1
Team	GP	W	L	T	PF	PA	Pts
Toronto Rugby Club	4	2	2	0	88	60	4
Peterborough Football Club	4	2	2	0	61	57	4
Toronto Argonauts	4	2	2	0	38	70	4

=== Schedule ===
Week	Date	Opponent	Result	Record	Venue
1	October 1	at Peterborough Football Club	L 2–19	0–1	Agricultural Park
2	October 8	vs. Toronto Rugby Club	L 7–28	0–2	Diamond Park
3	Bye				
4	October 22	at Toronto Rugby Club	W 18–6	1–2	Varsity Athletic Field
5	Bye				
6	November 5	vs. Peterborough Football Club	W 11–7	2–2	Rosedale Field

== Postseason ==
Round	Date	Opponent	Result	Location
ORFU District 1 Tie-Break Semi-Final	November 12	vs. Toronto Rugby Club	L 4–14	Varsity Athletic Field
