= 1945 Toronto Argonauts season =

CFL team season

- Head coach: Teddy Morris
- Home stadium: Varsity Stadium

Results
- Record: 5–1
- Division place: 2nd, IRFU
- Playoffs: Won Grey Cup

The 1945 Toronto Argonauts season was the 56th season for the team since the franchise's inception in 1873 and the first since World War II. The team finished in second place in the Interprovincial Rugby Football Union with a 5–1 record and qualified for the playoffs for the seventh consecutive season. The Argonauts defeated the Ottawa Rough Riders in a two-game total-points IRFU Final series before winning the Eastern Final over the Toronto Balmy Beach Beachers. The Argonauts defeated the Winnipeg Blue Bombers in the 33rd Grey Cup game by a score of 35–0, winning the franchise's sixth Grey Cup championship.

== Regular season ==
=== Standings ===
Interprovincial Rugby Football Union
Team	GP	W	L	T	PF	PA	Pts
Ottawa Rough Riders	6	5	1	0	105	40	10
Toronto Argonauts	6	5	1	0	92	44	10
Hamilton Tigers	6	1	5	0	36	68	2
Montreal Hornets	6	1	5	0	32	113	2

=== Schedule ===
Week	Game	Date	Opponent	Results	
Week	Game	Date	Opponent	Score	Record
1	1	Sat, Sept 22	at Ottawa Rough Riders	W 11–9	1–0
2	2	Sat, Sept 29	vs. Ottawa Rough Riders	L 6–8	1–1
3	3	Sat, Oct 6	vs. Montreal Hornets	W 21–3	2–1
4	4	Sat, Oct 13	at Hamilton Tigers	W 10–8	3–1
5	5	Sat, Oct 20	vs. Hamilton Tigers	W 13–10	4–1
6	6	Sat, Oct 27	at Montreal Hornets	W 31–6	5–1

== Postseason ==
Game	Date	Opponent	Location	Final score
IRFU Final Game 1	Nov 3	Ottawa Rough Riders	Varsity Stadium	W 27–8
IRFU Final Game 2	Nov 10	@ Ottawa Rough Riders	Lansdowne Park	L 10–6
Eastern Final	Nov 24	Toronto Balmy Beach Beachers	Varsity Stadium	W 14–2
Grey Cup	Dec 1	Winnipeg Blue Bombers	Varsity Stadium	W 35–0

=== Grey Cup ===
December 1 @ Varsity Stadium (Attendance: 18,660)

Team	Q1	Q2	Q3	Q4	Total
Winnipeg Blue Bombers	0	0	0	0	0
Toronto Argonauts	12	0	12	11	35
