= 1922 Toronto Argonauts season =

CFL team season

- Head coach: Jack O'Connor
- Home stadium: Varsity Stadium

Results
- Record: 5–0–1
- Division place: 1st, IRFU
- Playoffs: Lost East Final

The 1922 Toronto Argonauts season was the 36th season for the team since the franchise's inception in 1873. The team finished in first place in the Interprovincial Rugby Football Union for the third consecutive season with a 5–0–1 record and defeated Toronto Parkdale Canoe Club in the East Semi-Final game. However, they lost to Queen's University in the East Final by a score of 12–11 and failed to defend their Grey Cup title.

== Regular season ==
=== Standings ===
Interprovincial Rugby Football Union
Team	GP	W	L	T	PF	PA	Pts
Toronto Argonauts	6	5	0	1	110	24	11
Hamilton Tigers	6	3	1	2	50	43	8
Montreal AAA Winged Wheelers	6	2	4	0	43	56	4
Ottawa Senators	6	0	5	1	23	103	1

=== Schedule ===
The Argonauts' home game on September 30 versus Montreal was played at Toronto Athletic Field at Scarboro Beach Park, owing to a scheduling clash with the University of Toronto, who played at Varsity Stadium that afternoon.

Week	Game	Date	Opponent	Results	
Week	Game	Date	Opponent	Score	Record
1	1	Sat, Sept 30	vs. Montreal Winged Wheelers	W 20–1	1–0
2	2	Sat, Oct 7	at Montreal Winged Wheelers	W 16–7	2–0
3	3	Sat, Oct 14	at Hamilton Tigers	W 12–2	3–0
4	4	Sat, Oct 21	at Ottawa Senators	W 28–1	4–0
5	Bye				
6	5	Sat, Nov 4	vs. Hamilton Tigers	T 12–12	4–0–1
7	6	Sat, Nov 11	vs. Ottawa Senators	W 22–1	5–0–1

== Postseason ==
Round	Date	Opponent	Results		Venue
Round	Date	Opponent	Score	Record	Venue
East Semi-Final	Sat, Nov 18	at Toronto Parkdale Paddlers	W 20–1	1–0	Varsity Stadium
East Final	Sat, Nov 25	vs. Queen's University	L 11–12	1–1	Varsity Stadium
