= 1907 in Canadian football =

The 1907 Canadian football season was the 16th season of organized play since the Canadian Rugby Union (CRU) was founded in 1892 and the 25th season since the creation of the Ontario Rugby Football Union (ORFU) and the Quebec Rugby Football Union (QRFU) in 1883. This year also marked the first for the Interprovincial Rugby Football Union, the first cross-provincial Canadian football league and the direct predecessor of the modern day's CFL East Division. The season concluded with the Montreal Football Club defeating Peterboro in the 1907 Dominion Championship game.

== Canadian Football News in 1907 ==
In December 1906, The Gazette reported that a proposal originated from Ottawa for the Ontario Rugby Football Union (ORFU) and the Quebec Rugby Football Union (QRFU) to merge, which would allow for higher calibre of play and create rivalries. W. A. Hewitt and the Toronto Argonauts favoured the higher-level league, and sought for all players to have unquestioned amateur status. He helped organize the meeting which established the Inter-provincial Rugby Football Union (IRFU) in 1907.

== Regular season ==
=== Final regular season standings ===
Note: GP = Games Played, W = Wins, L = Losses, T = Ties, PF = Points For, PA = Points Against, Pts = Points

**Interprovincial Rugby Football Union**
Team	GP	W	L	T	PF	PA	Pts
**Montreal Football Club**	6	5	1	0	85	33	10
Hamilton Tigers	6	4	2	0	71	50	8
Ottawa Rough Riders	6	2	4	0	78	102	4
Toronto Argonauts	6	1	5	0	63	112	2

Ontario Rugby Football Union
Team	GP	W	L	T	PF	PA	Pts
ORFU West
**Toronto Victorias**	2	1	1	0	32	60	2
**Peterboro**	2	1	1	0	60	32	2
ORFU East
**Montreal Westmounts**	2	2	0	0	37	6	4
Kingston Granites	2	0	2	0	6	37	0

**Intercollegiate Rugby Football Union**
Team	GP	W	L	T	PF	PA	Pts
Ottawa	6	4	1	1	71	74	9
Toronto	6	3	3	0	70	58	6
Queen's	6	2	3	1	53	76	5
McGill	6	2	4	0	75	61	4

*Bold text means that they have clinched the playoffs

Manitoba Rugby Football Union
Team	GP	W	L	T	PF	PA	Pts
Winnipeg Rowing Club	4	3	1	0	55	21	6
St.John's Rugby Football Club	4	1	3	0	21	55	2

Saskatchewan Rugby Football League
Team	GP	W	L	T	PF	PA	Pts
Moose Jaw Tigers	4	2	1	1	38	21	5
Regina Civil Service	4	2	2	0	23	32	4
Regina City Football Club	4	1	2	1	28	36	3

== League champions ==
Football Union	League Champion
IRFU	Montreal Football Club
CIRFU	Ottawa College
ORFU	Peterboro
MRFU	Winnipeg Rowing Club
SRFL	Moose Jaw Tigers
ARFL	Edmonton Rugby Foot-ball Club

== Playoffs ==
=== Alberta Rugby Football League Playoffs ===
ARFL Playoffs Game
Date	Away	Home
October 31	Strathcona 0	Calgary Rugby Foot-ball Club 15

- Calgary advances to final

ARFL Finals Games 1 & 2
Date	Away	Home
November 9	Calgary Rugby Foot-ball Club 5	Edmonton Rugby Foot-ball Club 26
November 16	Edmonton Rugby Foot-ball Club 10	Calgary Rugby Foot-ball Club 5

- Edmonton wins the total-point series 36-10.

=== ORFU West Final ===
Away	Home
Peterboro 15	Toronto Victorias 6

- Peterboro advances to the ORFU Final.

=== ORFU Final ===
Away	Home
Peterboro 25	Montreal Westmounts 4

- Peterboro advances to the Dominion Championship.

== Dominion Championship ==
November 30 1907 Dominion Championship Game: McGill University - Montreal, Quebec
Montreal 71	Peterboro 10
Montreal Football Club are the 1907 Dominion Champions
