= 1913 Toronto Argonauts season =

CFL team season

- Head coach: Ross Binkley
- Home stadium: Rosedale Field

Results
- Record: 3–3
- Division place: 3rd, IRFU
- Playoffs: Did not qualify

The 1913 Toronto Argonauts season was the 30th season for the team since the franchise's inception in 1873. The team finished in third place in the Interprovincial Rugby Football Union with a 3–3 record and failed to qualify for the playoffs.

== Regular season ==
=== Standings ===
Interprovincial Rugby Football Union
Team	GP	W	L	T	PF	PA	Pts
Hamilton Tigers	6	5	1	0	143	37	10
Ottawa Rough Riders	6	4	2	0	84	87	8
Toronto Argonauts	6	3	3	0	101	87	6
Montreal Football Club	6	0	6	0	27	144	0

=== Schedule ===
Week	Date	Opponent	Final score	Record
1	Oct 4	@ Hamilton Tigers	L 24–14	0–1–0
2	Oct 11	Montreal Football Club	W 23–11	1–1–0
3	Oct 18	Ottawa Rough Riders	T 10–10	1–1–0
4	Oct 25	@ Montreal Football Club	W 16–1	2–1–0
5	Nov 1	@ Ottawa Rough Riders	L 18–11	2–2–0
6	Nov 8	Hamilton Tigers	L 21–7	2–3–0
7	Nov 15	Ottawa Rough Riders	W 30–12	3–3–0

(*) The October 18 game versus Ottawa that ended in a tie was replayed on Nov 15 and did not count towards the standings.
