= 1911 Toronto Argonauts season =

CFL team season

- Head coach: Joe Lee (pre-season); Billy Foulds (league season)
- Home stadium: Rosedale Field

Results
- Record: 5–1
- Division place: 1st, IRFU
- Playoffs: Lost Grey Cup

The 1911 Toronto Argonauts season was the 28th season for the team since the franchise's inception in 1873. The team finished in first place in the Interprovincial Rugby Football Union with a 5–1 record and qualified for the playoffs. After defeating the Hamilton Alerts in the Eastern Final, the Argonauts lost the 3rd Grey Cup to the Toronto Varsity Blues.

Coach Joe Lee unexpectedly resigned on October 4, two days before the first league game, and was replaced the next day by ex-University of Toronto quarterback Billy Foulds.

== Pre-season and Exhibition ==
Date	Opponent	Location	Final score	Attendance	Record
Sept 30	@ Queen's University	University Athletic Field	W 15-1	?	1–0–0
Oct 30	Toronto Amateur Athletic Club	Rosedale Field	W 12-8	3,000	2–0–0

== Regular season ==
=== Standings ===
Interprovincial Rugby Football Union
Team	GP	W	L	T	PF	PA	Pts
Toronto Argonauts	6	5	1	0	56	31	10
Hamilton Tigers	6	3	3	0	83	57	6
Ottawa Rough Riders	6	3	3	0	61	83	6
Montreal Football Club	6	1	5	0	49	78	2

=== Schedule ===
Week	Date	Opponent	Location	Final score	Attendance	Record
1	Oct 7	Hamilton Tigers	Rosedale Field	W 12–8	"a large crowd"	1–0–0
2	Oct 14	@ Montreal Football Club	Montreal AAA Grounds	W 7–1	?	2–0–0
3	Oct 21	Ottawa Rough Riders	Rosedale Field	W 7–4	4,000	3–0–0
4	Oct 28	Montreal Football Club	Rosedale Field	W 14–8	4,000	4–0–0
5	Nov 4	@ Hamilton Tigers	Hamilton AAA Grounds	L 9–8	?	4–1–0
6	Nov 11	@ Ottawa Rough Riders	Lansdowne Park	W 8–1	7,000	5–1–0

== Postseason ==
Game	Date	Opponent	Location	Final score	Attendance
Dominion Semi-Final	Nov 18	Hamilton Alerts	Rosedale Field	W 9–2	5,000
Grey Cup	Nov 25	Toronto Varsity Blues	Varsity Stadium	L 14–7	13,687

=== Grey Cup ===
November 25 @ Varsity Stadium (Attendance: 13,687)

Team	Q1	Q2	Q3	Q4	Total
Toronto Argonauts	1	0	2	4	7
Toronto Varsity Blues	0	6	7	1	14
