= 1912 Toronto Argonauts season =

CFL team season

- Head coach: Jack Newton
- Home stadium: Rosedale Field

Results
- Record: 5–1
- Division place: 1st, IRFU
- Playoffs: Lost Grey Cup

The 1912 Toronto Argonauts season was the 29th season for the team since the franchise's inception in 1873. The team finished in first place in the Interprovincial Rugby Football Union with a 5–1 record and qualified for the playoffs. After defeating the Toronto Varsity Blues in the Eastern Final, the Argonauts lost the 4th Grey Cup to the Hamilton Alerts.

== Regular season ==
=== Standings ===
Interprovincial Rugby Football Union
Team	GP	W	L	T	PF	PA	Pts
Toronto Argonauts	6	5	1	0	78	56	10
Ottawa Rough Riders	6	4	2	0	77	65	8
Hamilton Tigers	6	3	3	0	90	66	6
Montreal Football Club	6	0	6	0	54	112	0

=== Schedule ===
Week	Date	Opponent	Final score	Record
1	Oct 5	@ Montreal Football Club	W 20–17	1–0–0
2	Oct 12	Hamilton Tigers	L 9–3	1–1–0
3	Oct 19	Montreal Football Club	W 13–8	2–1–0
4	Oct 26	@ Hamilton Tigers	W 7–5	3–1–0
5	Nov 2	@ Ottawa Rough Riders	W 12–6	4–1–0
6	Nov 9	Ottawa Rough Riders	W 23–11	5–1–0

== Postseason ==
Game	Date	Opponent	Location	Final score
Eastern Final	Nov 23	Toronto Varsity Blues	Varsity Stadium	W 22–16
Grey Cup	Nov 30	Hamilton Alerts	A.A.A. Grounds	L 11–4

=== Grey Cup ===
November 30 @ A.A.A. Grounds (Attendance: 5,337)

Team	Q1	Q2	Q3	Q4	Total
Toronto Argonauts	0	2	0	2	4
Hamilton Alerts	2	2	7	0	11
