= 1970 Calgary Stampeders season =

Canadian football team season

- General manager: Rogers Lehew
- Head coach: Jim Duncan
- Home stadium: McMahon Stadium

Results
- Record: 9–7
- Division place: 3rd, West
- Playoffs: Lost Grey Cup

The 1970 Calgary Stampeders finished in third place in the Western Conference with a 9–7 record. They appeared in the Grey Cup where they lost to the Montreal Alouettes.

== Regular season ==
=== Season standings ===
Western Football Conference
Team	GP	W	L	T	PF	PA	Pts
Saskatchewan Roughriders	16	14	2	0	369	206	28
Edmonton Eskimos	16	9	7	0	282	287	18
Calgary Stampeders	16	9	7	0	293	209	18
BC Lions	16	6	10	0	295	384	12
Winnipeg Blue Bombers	16	2	14	0	184	332	4

=== Season schedule ===
Week	Game	Date	Opponent	Results		Venue	Attendance
Week	Game	Date	Opponent	Score	Record	Venue	Attendance
1	1	Wed, July 29	vs. Winnipeg Blue Bombers	W 34–10	1–0	McMahon Stadium	19,436
2	2	Wed, Aug 5	at Edmonton Eskimos	L 2–14	1–1	Clarke Stadium	21,267
2	3	Mon, Aug 10	vs. BC Lions	W 16–9	2–1	McMahon Stadium	20,402
3	4	Mon, Aug 17	at Saskatchewan Roughriders	W 30–0	3–1	Taylor Field	18,553
4	5	Thu, Aug 20	at BC Lions	L 13–27	3–2	Empire Stadium	35,627
5	6	Wed, Aug 26	vs. Saskatchewan Roughriders	L 17–21	3–3	McMahon Stadium	23,616
6	7	Wed, Sept 2	at Winnipeg Blue Bombers	W 29–18	4–3	Winnipeg Stadium	23,553
6	8	Mon, Sept 7	vs. Edmonton Eskimos	W 28–13	5–3	McMahon Stadium	23,310
7	Bye						
8	9	Wed, Sept 16	at Hamilton Tiger-Cats	L 18–39	5–4	Ivor Wynne Stadium	21,100
8	10	Sat, Sept 19	at Ottawa Rough Riders	L 1–9	5–5	Lansdowne Park	23,013
9	11	Sun, Sept 27	vs. Toronto Argonauts	W 27–12	6–5	McMahon Stadium	21,292
10	Bye						
11	12	Wed, Oct 7	vs. Montreal Alouettes	W 11–4	7–5	McMahon Stadium	18,970
11	13	Mon, Oct 12	at Edmonton Eskimos	L 13–16	7–6	Clarke Stadium	23,846
12	14	Sun, Oct 18	vs. Saskatchewan Roughriders	L 14–29	7–7	McMahon Stadium	23,616
13	15	Sun, Oct 25	vs. BC Lions	W 29–0	8–7	McMahon Stadium	20,916
14	16	Sun, Nov 1	at Winnipeg Blue Bombers	W 11–6	9–7	Winnipeg Stadium	10,131

== Playoffs ==
=== West Semi-Final ===
Western Semi-Finals
Calgary Stampeders @ Edmonton Eskimos
Date	Away	Home
November 8	Calgary Stampeders 16	Edmonton Eskimos 9

=== West Final ===
Western Finals – Game 1
Calgary Stampeders @ Saskatchewan Roughriders
Date	Away	Home
November 14	Calgary Stampeders 28	Saskatchewan Roughriders 11

Western Finals – Game 2
Saskatchewan Roughriders @ Calgary Stampeders
Date	Away	Home
November 18	Saskatchewan Roughriders 11	Calgary Stampeders 3

Western Finals – Game 3
Calgary Stampeders @ Saskatchewan Roughriders
Date	Away	Home
November 22	Calgary Stampeders 15	Saskatchewan Roughriders 14

- Calgary wins the best of three series 2–1. The Stampeders will advance to the Grey Cup Championship game.

=== Grey Cup ===
November 28 58th Annual Grey Cup Game: Exhibition Stadium – Toronto, Ontario
Western Champion	Eastern Champion
Calgary Stampeders 10	Montreal Alouettes 23
The Montreal Alouettes are the 1970 Grey Cup Champions
Sonny Wade (QB), Montreal Alouettes – Grey Cup's Most Valuable Player.

== Awards and records ==
- CFL's Most Outstanding Lineman Award – Wayne Harris (LB)

=== 1970 CFL All-Stars ===
- RB – Hugh McKinnis, CFL All-Star
- TE – Herman Harrison, CFL All-Star
- LB – Wayne Harris, CFL All-Star

== Videos ==
Game 3 of the Western finals in its entirety
