= 1902 Toronto Argonauts season =

CFL team season

- Home stadium: Rosedale Field

Results
- Record: 2–2
- Division place: 2nd, ORFU senior series
- Playoffs: Did not qualify

The 1902 Toronto Argonauts season was the club's 17th season of organized league play since its inception in 1873. The team finished in second place in the senior series of the Ontario Rugby Football Union with two wins and two losses, and failed to qualify for the Dominion playoffs.

== Regular season ==
The Hamilton Tigers withdrew from the competition after playing one game, and victory in their remaining scheduled games was defaulted to their opponent.

=== Standings ===
Ontario Rugby Football Union (senior series)
Team	GP	W	L	T	PF	PA	Pts
Ottawa Rough Riders	4	4	0	0	29	4	8
Toronto Argonauts	4	2	2	0	21	32	4
Hamilton Tigers	4	0	4	0	3	17	0

=== Schedule ===
Week	Date	Opponent	Result	Record	Venue	Attendance
1	Oct 4	@ Hamilton Tigers	W 17–3	1–0	Hamilton AAA Grounds	2,000
2	Bye					
3	Oct 18	Ottawa Rough Riders	L 4–9	1–1	Rosedale Field	2,500
4	Oct 25	@ Ottawa Rough Riders	L 0–20	1–2	Varsity Oval	3,000
5	Nov 1	Hamilton Tigers	W (forfeit)	2–2	Rosedale Field	

Round	Date	Opponent	Result	Venue	Attendance
City Championship (Game 1)	Nov 15	University of Toronto	L 9–22	Varsity Athletic Field	1,500
City Championship (Game 2)	Nov 22	University of Toronto	L 5–30	Varsity Athletic Field	2,000
