= 1906 Toronto Argonauts season =

CFL team season

- Head coach: Chaucer Elliott
- Home stadium: Varsity Athletic Field

Results
- Record: 4–2
- Division place: 2nd, ORFU senior series
- Playoffs: Did not qualify

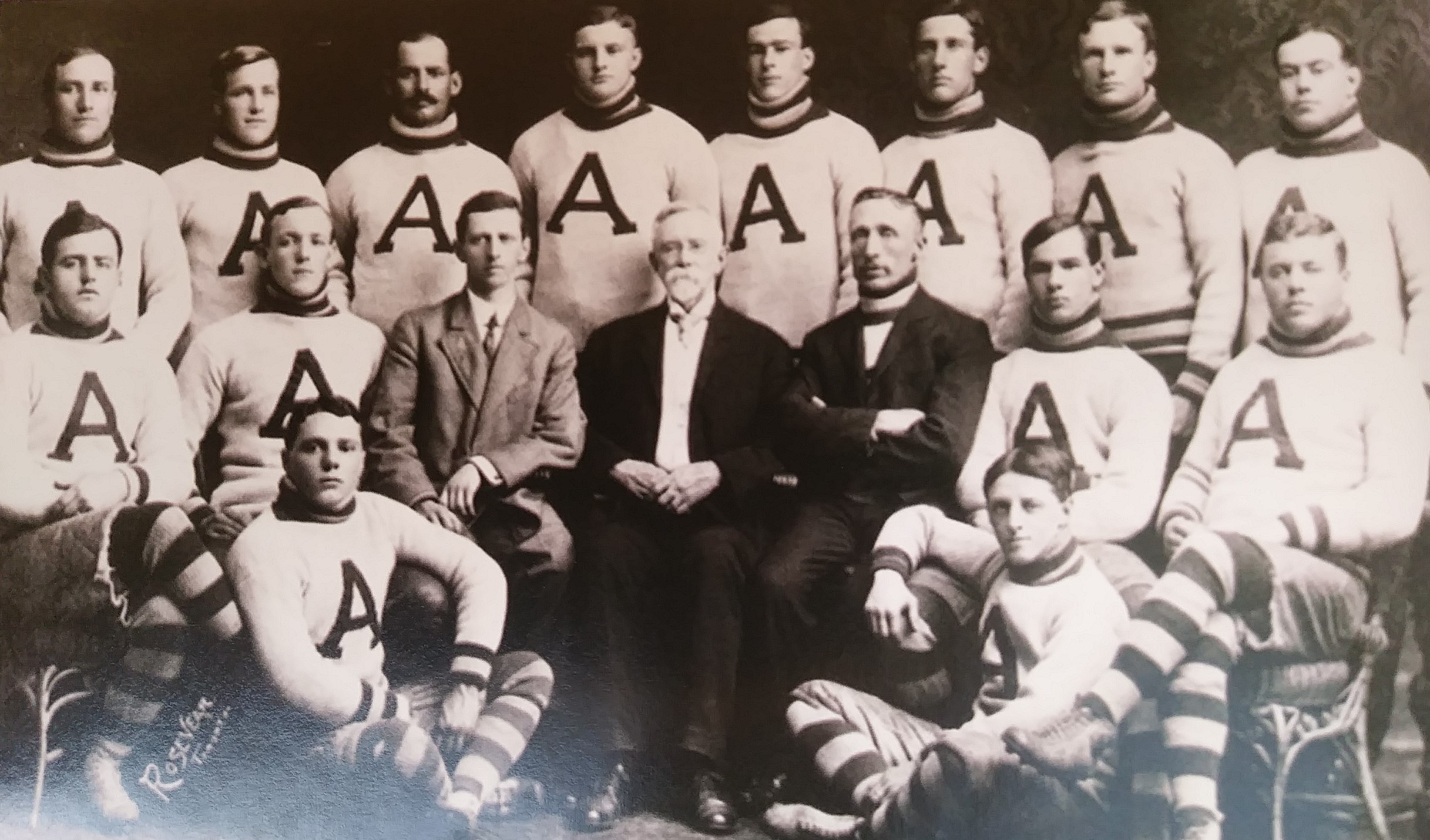
1906 Toronto Argonauts

The 1906 Toronto Argonauts season was the Argonaut Football Club's ninth season of organized league play since joining the Ontario Rugby Football Union 1898, and its final season playing in the ORFU senior series. The team finished in second place in the series with four wins and two losses, while the Hamilton Tigers qualified for the Dominion playoffs by winning the series with a perfect record.

After playing the 1905 season under the name "Toronto-Argonauts" following a merger with the Toronto Rugby Club, on September 7 the club decided to revert to the simpler "Argonaut Rugby Club" name.

Having managed the club to a 4-2 record in 1905, W. A. Hewitt returned for a second season as manager in 1906. On September 26 the club announced the appointment of Chaucer Elliott as coach, making Elliott the first coach in club history.

== Regular season ==
=== Standings ===
Ontario Rugby Football Union senior series
Team	GP	W	L	T	PF	PA	Pts
Hamilton Tigers	6	6	0	0	211	22	12
Toronto Argonauts	6	4	2	0	82	48	8
Peterborough Football Club	6	1	5	0	52	67	2
Toronto Victorias	6	1	5	0	45	170	2

=== Schedule ===
Week	Date	Opponent	Location	Final score	Attendance	Record
1	Bye					0–0–0
2	Oct 6	Toronto Victorias	Varsity Athletic Field	W 21–3	'a few hundred'	1–0–0
3	Oct 13	@ Hamilton Tigers	Hamilton AAA Grounds	L 19–6	'a large crowd'	1–1–0
4	Oct 18	@ Toronto Victorias	Varsity Athletic Field	W 15–5	'a very good crowd'	2–1–0
5	Oct 27	@ Peterborough Football Club	Riverside Park	W 13–7	not reported	3–1–0
6	Nov 3	Hamilton Tigers	Varsity Athletic Field	L 10–8	6,000	3–2–0
7	Nov 10	Peterborough Football Club	Varsity Athletic Field	W 12–4	"a fair crowd"	4–2–0
