= 1910 Toronto Argonauts season =

CFL team season

- Head coach: Ralph Ripley
- Home stadium: Rosedale Field

Results
- Record: 3–3
- Division place: 2nd, IRFU
- Playoffs: Did not qualify

The 1910 Toronto Argonauts season was the 27th season for the team since the franchise's inception in 1873. The team finished in second place in the Interprovincial Rugby Football Union with a 3–3 record and failed to qualify for the playoffs.

== Pre-season and Exhibition ==
Date	Opponent	Location	Final score	Attendance	Record
Oct 1	Hamilton Tigers	Rosedale Field	W 15-13	1,500	1–0–0
Oct 31	Hamilton Tigers	Hamilton AAA Grounds	L 30-1	"a large crowd"	1–1–0

== Regular season ==
This was the first season in which it became usual for the Montreal Football Club to be referred to as the Winged Wheelers.

=== Standings ===
Interprovincial Rugby Football Union
Team	GP	W	L	T	PF	PA	Pts
Hamilton Tigers	6	4	2	0	76	43	8
Ottawa Rough Riders	6	3	3	0	70	66	6
Toronto Argonauts	6	3	3	0	68	92	6
Montreal Winged Wheelers	6	2	4	0	74	87	4

=== Schedule ===
Week	Date	Opponent	Location	Final score	Record
1	Oct 8	@ Montreal Winged Wheelers	Montreal AAA Grounds	L 25–10	0–1–0
2	Oct 15	@ Hamilton Tigers	Hamilton AAA Grounds	L 18–4	0–2–0
3	Oct 22	Montreal Winged Wheelers	Rosedale Field	W 16–15	1–2–0
4	Oct 29	Ottawa Rough Riders	Rosedale Field	W 11–4	2–2–0
5	Nov 5	@ Ottawa Rough Riders	Lansdowne Park	L 23–20	2–3–0
6	Nov 12	Hamilton Tigers	Rosedale Field	W 7–6	3–3–0
