= 1970 Montreal Alouettes season =

CFL team season

- General manager: Red O'Quinn
- Head coach: Sam Etcheverry
- Home stadium: Autostade

Results
- Record: 7–6–1
- Division place: 3rd, East
- Playoffs: Won Grey Cup

Uniform

The 1970 Montreal Alouettes season was the 13th season for the team in the Canadian Football League (CFL) and their 25th overall. The Alouettes finished the season in third place in the Eastern Conference with a 7–6–1 record and won the Grey Cup, by defeating another third place team, the Calgary Stampeders in a rain soaked field, which both teams called disgraceful. This was Montreal's second Grey Cup, with the first being in their fourth year of existence in 1949. The 1970 season was the first season under head coach Sam Etcheverry and the first under general manager Red O'Quinn.

== Preseason ==
Game	Date	Opponent	Results		Venue	Attendance
Game	Date	Opponent	Score	Record	Venue	Attendance
A	July 7	vs. Winnipeg Blue Bombers	W 27–23	1–0	Autostade	10,000
B	July 15	vs. Calgary Stampeders	T 8–8	1–0–1	Autostade	12,144
B	July 20	at Ottawa Rough Riders	W 15–8	2–0–1	Lansdowne Park	15,796
C	July 24	at Toronto Argonauts	L 19–20	2–1–1	Exhibition Stadium	30,866

== Regular season ==
=== Standings ===
Eastern Football Conference
Team	GP	W	L	T	PF	PA	Pts
Hamilton Tiger-Cats	14	8	5	1	292	279	17
Toronto Argonauts	14	8	6	0	329	290	16
Montreal Alouettes	14	7	6	1	246	279	15
Ottawa Rough Riders	14	4	10	0	255	279	8

=== Schedule ===
Week	Game	Date	Opponent	Results		Venue	Attendance
Week	Game	Date	Opponent	Score	Record	Venue	Attendance
1	1	Aug 4	vs. Toronto Argonauts	W 34–27	1–0	Autostade	26,743
2	2	Aug 12	at Winnipeg Blue Bombers	W 16–10	2–0	Winnipeg Stadium	18,992
3	3	Aug 18	vs. Edmonton Eskimos	W 14–10	3–0	Autostade	27,046
4	Bye						
5	4	Sept 2	at Ottawa Rough Riders	L 7–31	3–1	Lansdowne Park	26,996
6	5	Sept 7	at Hamilton Tiger-Cats	L 12–17	3–2	Ivor Wynne Stadium	28,702
7	6	Sept 12	vs. Hamilton Tiger-Cats	W 38–23	4–2	Autostade	25,721
8	7	Sept 20	at Toronto Argonauts	W 24–17	5–2	Exhibition Stadium	33,135
9	8	Sept 27	vs. Ottawa Rough Riders	W 16–15	6–2	Autostade	26,677
10	9	Oct 4	at Saskatchewan Roughriders	L 10–29	6–3	Taylor Field	21,708
11	10	Oct 7	at Calgary Stampeders	L 4–11	6–4	McMahon Stadium	18,970
12	11	Oct 14	vs. BC Lions	W 28–27	7–4	Autostade	18,077
12	12	Oct 18	at Toronto Argonauts	L 13–16	7–5	Exhibition Stadium	33,135
13	13	Oct 24	vs. Ottawa Rough Riders	L 12–28	7–6	Autostade	19,758
14	14	Nov 1	vs. Hamilton Tiger-Cats	T 18–18	7–6–1	Autostade	25,886

== Postseason ==
Round	Date	Opponent	Results		Venue	Attendance
Round	Date	Opponent	Score	Record	Venue	Attendance
East Semi-Final	Nov 7	at Toronto Argonauts	W 16–7	1–0	Exhibition Stadium	31,794
East Final Game 1	Nov 15	vs. Hamilton Tiger-Cats	W 32–22	2–0	Autostade	33,212
East Final Game 2	Nov 21	at Hamilton Tiger-Cats	W 11–4	3–0	Ivor Wynne Stadium	24,270
Grey Cup	Nov 28	vs. Calgary Stampeders	W 23–10	4–0	Exhibition Stadium	32,669

=== Grey Cup ===
Team	Q1	Q2	Q3	Q4	Total
Montreal Alouettes	6	3	7	7	23
Calgary Stampeders	7	0	3	0	10

== Awards and honours ==
- CFL All-Star – Steve Smear – Defensive end
- CFL All-Star – Al Phaneuf – Defensive back
