= 1970 BC Lions season =

Canadian football team season

- General manager: Denny Veitch
- Head coach: Jackie Parker
- Home stadium: Empire Stadium

Results
- Record: 6–10
- Division place: 4th, West
- Playoffs: did not qualify

Uniform

The 1970 BC Lions finished in fourth place in the Western Conference with a 6–10 record and failed to make the playoffs. New coach Jackie Parker had led the team to a 4–2 record in the final six games of 1969 after taking over for Jim Champion and there was reason for optimism after a 5–3 start to 1970. However, the wheels fell off in the fall as the Lions won only one game in the second half of the season.

Before the season, Empire Stadium became the first facility in Canada to have artificial playing surface installed, made by 3M, under the brand name "Tartan Turf".

Running back Jim Evenson had his third consecutive 1,000-yard season with 1003 yards in an injury-shortened 14 games and receiver Jim Young had 1041 yards receiving. The big offseason addition of Ottawa star Vic Washington was a bust as he played only 9 games and was openly disgruntled for most of season.

For the first time in five seasons, the Lions had CFL All-stars as Evenson, guard Ken Sugarman and linebacker Greg Findlay were all league all-stars. Young won the CFL's Most Outstanding Canadian Award.

The Lions introduced a new jersey which featured orange "ti-cat" stripes down the arms of home and away jerseys. As well, the Lions went to grey pants which they would wear for the next eight seasons. The "BC" on the lion's cheek was black for only this season; all other seasons it was white because it showed up better on television.

After the season, Jackie Parker was promoted to general manager and he hired Eagle Keys away from Saskatchewan to become head coach of the Lions for the 1971 season.

== Offseason ==
=== CFL draft ===
Round	Pick	Player	Position	School

== Preseason ==
Game	Date	Opponent	Results		Venue	Attendance
Game	Date	Opponent	Score	Record	Venue	Attendance
A	Mon, July 6	vs. Edmonton Eskimos	L 19–37	0–1	Empire Stadium	24,702
B	Fri, July 10	at Saskatchewan Roughriders	L 21–27	0–2	Taylor Field	
C	Thu, July 16	vs. Toronto Argonauts	L 25–42	0–3	Empire Stadium	
D	Tue, July 21	at Winnipeg Blue Bombers	L 22–25	0–4	Winnipeg Stadium	13,100

== Regular season ==
=== Season standings ===
Western Football Conference
Team	GP	W	L	T	PF	PA	Pts
Saskatchewan Roughriders	16	14	2	0	369	206	28
Edmonton Eskimos	16	9	7	0	282	287	18
Calgary Stampeders	16	9	7	0	293	209	18
BC Lions	16	6	10	0	295	384	12
Winnipeg Blue Bombers	16	2	14	0	184	332	4

=== Season schedule ===
Game	Date	Opponent	Results		Venue	Attendance
Game	Date	Opponent	Score	Record	Venue	Attendance
1	Tue, July 28	vs. Saskatchewan Roughriders	L 9–42	0–1	Empire Stadium	29,152
2	Tue, Aug 4	at Winnipeg Blue Bombers	W 48–21	1–1	Winnipeg Stadium	17,340
3	Mon, Aug 10	at Calgary Stampeders	L 9–16	1–2	McMahon Stadium	20,402
4	Thu, Aug 13	at Edmonton Eskimos	W 35–7	2–2	Clarke Stadium	18,992
5	Thu, Aug 20	vs. Calgary Stampeders	W 27–13	3–2	Empire Stadium	35,627
6	Thu, Aug 27	vs. Ottawa Rough Riders	W 32–30	4–2	Empire Stadium	35,563
7	Tue, Sept 1	at Edmonton Eskimos	L 9–20	4–3	Clarke Stadium	18,140
8	Sun, Sept 13	vs. Winnipeg Blue Bombers	W 16–13	5–3	Empire Stadium	36,250
9	Fri, Sept 18	at Saskatchewan Roughriders	L 22–23	5–4	Taylor Field	17,535
10	Wed, Sept 23	vs. Hamilton Tiger-Cats	L 14–26	5–5	Empire Stadium	29,787
11	Sat, Oct 3	vs. Edmonton Eskimos	L 20–32	5–6	Empire Stadium	35,107
12	Sat, Oct 10	at Toronto Argonauts	7–50	5–7	Exhibition Stadium	33,135
13	Wed, Oct 14	at Montreal Alouettes	L 27–28	5–8	Autostade	18,077
14	Wed, Oct 21	vs. Winnipeg Blue Bombers	W 7–1	6–8	Empire Stadium	22,510
15	Sun, Oct 25	at Calgary Stampeders	L 0–29	6–9	McMahon Stadium	20,916
16	Sun, Nov 1	vs. Saskatchewan Roughriders	L 13–33	6–10	Empire Stadium	23,739

=== Offensive leaders ===
Player	Passing yds	Rushing yds	Receiving yds	TD
Paul Brothers	2604	227	0	3
Jim Evenson		1003	125	11
A.D. Whitfield		754	495	3
Jim Young		171	1041	7
Vic Washington		10	475	2
Lefty Hendrickson		0	431	1

== Awards and records ==
- CFL's Most Outstanding Canadian Award – Jim Young (WR)

=== 1970 CFL All-Stars ===
- RB – Jim Evenson, CFL All-Star
- OG – Ken Sugerman, CFL All-Star
- LB – Greg Findlay, CFL All-Star
