= 1970 Saskatchewan Roughriders season =

- General manager: Ken Preston
- Head coach: Eagle Keys
- Home stadium: Taylor Field

Results
- Record: 14–2
- Division place: 1st, West
- Playoffs: Lost West Final

The 1970 Saskatchewan Roughriders finished in first place in the Western Conference with a 14–2–0 record, which still stands as a franchise record for most wins in a single season. The team's winning percentage of 0.875 is also the best since the creation of the Western Interprovincial Football Union in 1936. The Roughriders qualified for the playoffs for the ninth straight season, but lost the West Final three-game series to the Calgary Stampeders. Between regular season and playoffs, Saskatchewan lost only three times at home, all to Calgary, including twice in their playoff series.

== Regular season ==
=== Season standings ===
Western Football Conference
Team	GP	W	L	T	PF	PA	Pts
Saskatchewan Roughriders	16	14	2	0	369	206	28
Edmonton Eskimos	16	9	7	0	282	287	18
Calgary Stampeders	16	9	7	0	293	209	18
BC Lions	16	6	10	0	295	384	12
Winnipeg Blue Bombers	16	2	14	0	184	332	4

=== Season schedule ===
Week	Game	Date	Opponent	Results		Venue	Attendance
Week	Game	Date	Opponent	Score	Record	Venue	Attendance
1	1	Tues, July 28	at BC Lions	W 42–9	1–0	Empire Stadium	29,152
1	2	Fri, July 31	vs. Edmonton Eskimos	W 23–11	2–0	Taylor Field	13,960
2	3	Sat, Aug 8	at Hamilton Tiger-Cats	W 23–22	3–0	Civic Stadium	25,135
3	4	Tues, Aug 11	at Ottawa Rough Riders	W 24–1	4–0	Frank Clair Stadium	25,192
4	5	Mon, Aug 17	vs. Calgary Stampeders	L 0–30	4–1	Taylor Field	18,553
5	6	Wed, Aug 26	at Calgary Stampeders	W 21–17	5–1	McMahon Stadium	23,616
5	7	Sun, Aug 30	vs. Toronto Argonauts	W 36–14	6–1	Taylor Field	20,179
6	8	Mon, Sept 7	vs. Winnipeg Blue Bombers	W 30–11	7–1	Taylor Field	15,433
7	9	Sat, Sept 12	at Edmonton Eskimos	L 6–10	7–2	Clarke Stadium	19,334
8	10	Fri, Sept 18	vs. BC Lions	W 23–22	8–2	Taylor Field	17,535
9	11	Sun, Sept 27	at Winnipeg Blue Bombers	W 5–2	9–2	Winnipeg Stadium	16,528
10	12	Sun, Oct 4	vs. Montreal Alouettes	W 29–10	10–2	Taylor Field	21,708
11	13	Sun, Oct 11	vs. Winnipeg Blue Bombers	W 19–10	11–2	Taylor Field	15,606
12	14	Sun, Oct 18	at Calgary Stampeders	W 21–14	12–2	Clarke Stadium	23,616
13	Bye						
14	15	Wed, Oct 28	vs. Edmonton Eskimos	W 34–10	13–2	Taylor Field	10,969
14	16	Sun, Nov 1	at BC Lions	W 33–13	14–2	Empire Stadium	23,738

== Postseason ==
=== Schedule ===
Round	Date	Opponent	Results		Venue	Attendance
Round	Date	Opponent	Score	Record	Venue	Attendance
West Final 1	Sat, Nov 14	vs. Calgary Stampeders	L 11–28	0–1	Taylor Field	15,510
West Final 2	Wed, Nov 18	at Calgary Stampeders	W 11–3	1–1	McMahon Stadium	23,616
West Final 3	Sun, Nov 22	vs. Calgary Stampeders	L 14–15	1–2	Taylor Field	18,385
