= 1909 Toronto Argonauts season =

CFL team season

- Head coach: Warren Coryell/Joe Wright
- Home stadium: Rosedale Field

Results
- Record: 1–5
- Division place: 3rd, IRFU
- Playoffs: Did not qualify

The 1909 Toronto Argonauts season was the 26th season for the team since the franchise's inception in 1873. The team finished in third place in the Interprovincial Rugby Football Union with a 1–5 record and failed to qualify for the playoffs.

It was the Argonaut Football Club's 12th season of organized league play since joining the Ontario Rugby Football Union in 1898, and its third season in the Interprovincial Rugby Football Union. The team finished in third place in the "Big Four" league with one win and five losses and failed to qualify for the Dominion playoffs.

The team was managed by Argonaut rowing great Joe Wright, a former Double Blue player, who took a hand in coaching the squad along with captain and quarterback Warren Coryell. This proved to be the last season in their history that the Argos played a season without a dedicated coach.

== Regular season ==
=== Standings ===
Interprovincial Rugby Football Union
Team	GP	W	L	T	PF	PA	Pts
Hamilton Tigers	6	5	1	0	111	22	10
Ottawa Rough Riders	6	5	1	0	76	71	10
Toronto Argonauts	6	1	5	0	54	93	2
Montreal Football Club	6	1	5	0	36	91	2

=== Schedule ===
Week	Date	Opponent	Location	Final score	Record
1	Bye				0–0–0
2	Oct 9	Montreal Football Club	Rosedale Field	L 13–5	0–1–0
3	Oct 16	@ Hamilton Tigers	Hamilton AAA Grounds	L 26–4	0–2–0
4	Oct 23	@ Ottawa Rough Riders	Varsity Oval	L 20–10	0–3–0
5	Oct 30	Ottawa Rough Riders	Rosedale Field	L 14–9	0–4–0
6	Nov 6	@ Montreal Football Club	Montreal AAA Grounds	W 22–4	1–4–0
7	Nov 13	Hamilton Tigers	Rosedale Field	L 14–4	1–5–0
