= 7th Grey Cup =

1915 Canadian Football championship game

| Hamilton Tigers | Toronto RC |
|---|---|
| 13 | 7 |
| Head coach: Liz Marriott | Head coach: Eddie Livingstone |
| | 1 | 2 | 3 | 4 | Total |
|---|---|---|---|---|---|
| Hamilton Tigers | 0 | 1 | 6 | 6 | 13 |
| Toronto RC | 4 | 0 | 2 | 1 | 7 |
- Date: November 20, 1915
- Stadium: Varsity Stadium
- Location: Toronto
- Attendance: 2,808

The 7th Grey Cup was played on November 20, 1915, before 2,808 fans at Varsity Stadium at Toronto to determine the championship of Canadian football.

The Hamilton Tigers defeated the Toronto Rowing and Athletic Association 13–7.

== Notable facts ==
- This was the last Grey Cup game before a World War I hiatus that lasted until 1920.
