= 1945 Ottawa Rough Riders season =

Canadian football team season

- Head coach: Ross Trimble
- Home stadium: Lansdowne Park

Results
- Record: 5–1
- Division place: 1st, IRFU
- Playoffs: Lost in IRFU Final

The 1945 Ottawa Rough Riders finished in first place in the Interprovincial Rugby Football Union with a 5–1 record but lost the IRFU Finals to the Toronto Argonauts by a total point score of 33–18.

== Regular season ==
=== Standings ===
Interprovincial Rugby Football Union
Team	GP	W	L	T	PF	PA	Pts
Ottawa Rough Riders	6	5	1	0	105	40	10
Toronto Argonauts	6	5	1	0	92	44	10
Hamilton Tigers	6	1	5	0	36	68	2
Montreal Hornets	6	1	5	0	32	113	2

=== Schedule ===
Week	Date	Opponent	Result	Record
1	Sept 22	vs. Toronto Argonauts	L 9–11	0–1
2	Sept 29	at Toronto Argonauts	W 8–6	1–1
3	Oct 6	vs. Hamilton Tigers	W 19–10	2–1
4	Oct 13	at Montreal Hornets	W 25–8	3–1
5	Oct 20	vs. Montreal Hornets	W 28–5	4–1
6	Oct 27	at Hamilton Tigers	W 16–0	5–1

== Postseason ==
=== Playoffs ===
Round	Date	Opponent	Result
IRFU Final #1	Nov 3	at Toronto Argonauts	L 8–27
IRFU Final #2	Nov 10	vs. Toronto Argonauts	W 10–6
