= 1915 in Canadian football =

The Hamilton Tigers won their second Grey Cup in three years in a win over the Toronto Rowing and Athletic Association. With the First World War raging in Europe, both teams donated their share of the gate receipts to patriotic funds.

Other than an abbreviated SRFU season the following year, this was the final season of Canadian football until 1919 due to the First World War.

== Canadian football news in 1915 ==
The Canadian Rugby Union (CRU) elected W. A. Hewitt president for the 1915 season. He appointed a commission to establish uniforms rules of play at different levels including collegiate and senior. He approached multiple football coaches and sought feedback on best ways to implement standard playing rules.

While there was no regular season in the Manitoba Rugby Football Union, one game was played: the Winnipeg Tigers beat the Winnipeg Canoe Club, 10-4, at River Park in Winnipeg, Saturday, October 23.

== Regular season ==
=== Final regular season standings ===
Note: GP = Games Played, W = Wins, L = Losses, T = Ties, PF = Points For, PA = Points Against, Pts = Points

**Interprovincial Rugby Football Union**
Team	GP	W	L	T	PF	PA	Pts
**Hamilton Tigers**	6	6	0	0	125	23	12
Toronto Argonauts	5	3	2	0	69	49	6
Ottawa Rough Riders	5	2	3	0	54	50	4
Montreal Football Club	6	0	6	0	10	136	0

Ontario Rugby Football Union
Team	GP	W	L	T	PF	PA	Pts
**Hamilton Rowing Club**	4	2	2	0	62	38	4
**Toronto Rowing and Athletic Association**	4	2	2	0	38	62	4

*Bold text means that they have clinched the playoffs

Saskatchewan Rugby Football Union
Team	GP	W	L	T	PF	PA	Pts
**South**
Regina Rugby Club	4	4	0	0	82	8	8
Moose Jaw Robin Hoods	4	0	4	0	8	82	0
**North**
Saskatoon Rugby Club	3	2	1	0	34	20	4
University of Saskatchewan Varsity	3	1	2	0	20	34	2

== League Champions ==
Football Union	League Champion
IRFU	Hamilton Tigers
WCRFU	Regina Rugby Club
CIRFU	No League Play
ORFU	Toronto Rowing and Athletic Association
MRFU	No League Champion
SRFU	Regina Rugby Club
ARFU	Calgary Canucks

== Grey Cup playoffs ==
Note: All dates in 1915

=== ARFU final ===
Date	Away	Home
October 16	**Calgary Canucks 18**	University of Alberta Varsity 12

- Calgary advances to western final.

=== Western final ===
Date	Away	Home
October 30	Calgary Canucks 1	**Regina Rugby Club 17**

=== Ontario Rugby Football Union playoffs ===
**ORFU Finals Games 1 & 2**
Date	Away	Home
November 6	Hamilton Rowing Club 5	**Toronto Rowing and Athletic Association 27**
November 23	Toronto Rowing and Athletic Association 11	**Hamilton Rowing Club 17**

- Toronto Rowing Club wins the total-point series 38-22

== Playoff bracket ==
**Semifinals**
IRFU	Hamilton Tigers
BYE
ORFU	Toronto Rowing and Athletic Association	38 (27+11)
ORFU	Hamilton Rowing Club	22 (5+17)

**Grey Cup final**
IRFU	Hamilton Tigers	13
ORFU	Toronto Rowing and Athletic Association	7

== Grey Cup Championship ==
November 20 7th Annual Grey Cup Game: Varsity Stadium – Toronto, Ontario
**Hamilton Tigers 13**	Toronto Rowing and Athletic Association 7
**Hamilton Tigers are the 1915 Grey Cup Champions**
