= 1923 Toronto Argonauts season =

CFL team season

- Head coach: Jack O'Connor
- Home stadium: Varsity Stadium

Results
- Record: 3–1–2
- Division place: 2nd, IRFU
- Playoffs: Did not qualify

The 1923 Toronto Argonauts season was the 37th season for the team since the franchise's inception in 1873. The team finished in second place in the Interprovincial Rugby Football Union with a 3–1–2 record and failed to qualify for the playoffs.

== Regular season ==
=== Standings ===
Interprovincial Rugby Football Union
Team	GP	W	L	T	PF	PA	Pts
Hamilton Tigers	6	4	1	1	58	54	9
Toronto Argonauts	6	3	1	2	71	41	8
Montreal AAA Winged Wheelers	6	2	3	1	45	73	5
Ottawa Senators	6	1	5	0	54	60	2

=== Schedule ===
Week	Game	Date	Opponent	Results	
Week	Game	Date	Opponent	Score	Record
1	1	Sat, Sept 29	vs. Hamilton Tigers	T 7–7	0–0–1
2	2	Sat, Oct 6	at Ottawa Senators	W 11–1	1–0–1
3	3	Sat, Oct 13	vs. Montreal Winged Wheelers	W 17–0	2–0–1
4	4	Sat, Oct 20	at Montreal Winged Wheelers	T 14–14	2–0–2
5	5	Sat, Oct 27	vs. Ottawa Senators	W 7–2	3–0–2
6	Bye				
7	6	Sat, Nov 10	at Hamilton Tigers	L 15–17	3–1–2
