= 1903 Toronto Argonauts season =

CFL team season

Results
- Record: Did not play
- Division place: Did not play

The 1903 Toronto Argonauts season was to be the club's 18th season of organized league play since its inception in 1873. However, the Argonaut Football Club resigned in protest from the senior series of the Ontario Rugby Football Union on the eve of the season after the ORFU Executive Committee rejected the club's petition against the Union's decision to reinstate two ineligible players on opposing clubs. As a result, the club did not participate in league competition in 1903.
