= 1970 Toronto Argonauts season =

CFL team season

- Head coach: Leo Cahill
- Home stadium: CNE Stadium

Results
- Record: 8–6
- Division place: 2nd, East
- Playoffs: Lost Eastern Semi-Final

The 1970 Toronto Argonauts finished in second place in the Eastern Conference with an 8–6 record. They appeared in the Eastern Semi-Final.

== Regular season ==
=== Standings ===
Eastern Football Conference
Team	GP	W	L	T	PF	PA	Pts
Hamilton Tiger-Cats	14	8	5	1	292	279	17
Toronto Argonauts	14	8	6	0	329	290	16
Montreal Alouettes	14	7	6	1	246	279	15
Ottawa Rough Riders	14	4	10	0	255	279	8

=== Schedule ===
Week	Game	Date	Opponent	Results		Venue	Attendance
Week	Game	Date	Opponent	Score	Record	Venue	Attendance
1	1	August 4	at Montreal Alouettes	L 27–34	0–1	Autostade	26,743
2	2	August 13	vs. Hamilton Tiger-Cats	W 29–3	1–1	CNE Stadium	33,135
3	3	August 20	vs. Edmonton Eskimos	W 16–14	2–1	CNE Stadium	33,135
4	4	August 26	at Winnipeg Blue Bombers	L 22–28	2–2	Winnipeg Stadium	19,108
4	5	August 30	at Saskatchewan Roughriders	L 14–36	2–3	Taylor Field	20,179
5	6	September 7	at Ottawa Rough Riders	W 37–21	3–3	Landsdowne Park	26,691
6	7	September 13	vs. Ottawa Rough Riders	W 30–25	4–3	CNE Stadium	33,135
7	8	September 20	vs. Montreal Alouettes	L 17–24	4–4	CNE Stadium	33,135
8	9	September 27	at Calgary Stampeders	L 12–27	4–5	McMahon Stadium	21,298
9	10	October 4	at Hamilton Tiger-Cats	W 33–14	5–5	Civic Stadium	29,455
10	11	October 10	vs. BC Lions	W 50–7	6–5	CNE Stadium	33,135
11	12	October 18	vs. Montreal Alouettes	W 16–13	7–5	CNE Stadium	33,135
12	13	October 25	at Hamilton Tiger-Cats	L 7–27	7–6	Civic Stadium	29,755
13	14	October 31	vs. Ottawa Rough Riders	W 19–17	8–6	CNE Stadium	31,794

== Postseason ==
Round	Date	Opponent	Results		Venue	Attendance
Round	Date	Opponent	Score	Record	Venue	Attendance
East Semi-Final	November 7	vs. Montreal Alouettes	L 7–16	0–1	CNE Stadium	33,135

== Awards and honors ==
- Marv Luster, Defensive Back, CFL All-Star
