= 1905 Toronto Argonauts season =

CFL team season

- Home stadium: Varsity Athletic Field

Results
- Record: 4–2
- Division place: 2nd, ORFU senior series
- Playoffs: Did not qualify

The 1905 Toronto Argonauts season was the Argonaut Football Club's eighth season of organized league play since joining the Ontario Rugby Football Union in 1898.

On August 22 the members of the rival Toronto Rugby Club decided to merge with the Argos, a decision that was made official at a joint meeting of the two clubs on August 28. The combined team operated under the name "Toronto-Argonaut Rugby Football Club" and played in the traditional "double-blue" uniforms of the Argonauts.

Retaining the services of Toronto RC manager W. A. Hewitt and a number of his players, the "Tor-Argos" finished in second place in the senior series of the ORFU with four wins (two by forfeit) and two losses, while the first-place Hamilton Tigers qualified for the Dominion playoffs by winning the series with a perfect record.

== Regular season ==
The London Rugby Club withdrew from the series in Week 3, most of the players having resigned after back-to-back losses to Hamilton by a total score of 108-6. This decision resulted in a pair of default wins for the Argonauts and the Toronto Victorias.

=== Standings ===
Ontario Rugby Football Union (senior series)
Team	GP	W	L	T	PF	PA	Pts
Hamilton Tigers	6	6	0	0	248	23	12
Toronto Argonauts	6	4	2	0	67	75	8
Toronto Victorias	6	2	4	0	12	127	4
London RC	6	0	6	0	6	108	0

=== Schedule ===
London withdrew from the senior series on October 17.

Week	Date	Opponent	Location	Final score	Attendance	Record
1	Sept 30	@ Toronto Victorias	Varsity Athletic Field	W 28–9	1,500	1–0–0
2	Oct 7	Toronto Victorias	Varsity Athletic Field	W 22–3	not reported	2–0–0
3	Bye					2–0–0
4	Oct 21	@ Hamilton Tigers	Hamilton AAA Grounds	L 41–7	4,000	2–1–0
5	Oct 26	@ London RC	n/a	W (forfeit)	n/a	3–1–0
6	Nov 11	Hamilton Tigers	Varsity Athletic Field	L 22–10	3,500	3–2–0
7	Nov 18	London RC	n/a	W (forfeit)	n/a	4–2–0
