= Toronto Rowing and Athletic Association =

Toronto Rowing & Athletic Association

General information
- Founded: 1912 (as successor to the Toronto Amateur Athletic Club founded in 1908)
- Folded: 1921
- Stadium: Rosedale Field
- Headquartered: Toronto, Ontario, Canada

Personnel
- Head coach: Eddie Livingstone

League / conference affiliations
- Ontario Rugby Football Union

The Toronto Rowing and Athletic Association (also known as the Torontos as well as Toronto Rugby and Athletic Association) were an ORFU football team in the early 20th century. The team was founded in 1908 as Toronto Amateur Athletic Club and became the team of the Toronto Rowing and Athletic Association in 1912. The team won the ORFU championship in 1915, 1919 and 1920. In 1915 they played in the 7th Grey Cup, losing to the Hamilton Tigers.

== ORFU season-by-season ==
Season	G	W	L	T	PF	PA	Pts	Finish	Playoffs
1912	3	2	1	0	64	29	4	2nd	lost ORFU playoff to Hamilton Alerts, 23-10
1913	4	2	2	0	79	50	4	2nd	lost ORFU playoff to Parkdale Canoe Club, 8-5
1914	4	2	2	0	63	41	4	2nd	
1915	4	2	2	0	38	62	4	1st	wins ORFU Championship over Hamilton Rowing Club in 2 games, 27-5 & 11-17, loses 7th Grey Cup to Hamilton Tigers, 13-7
1916 to 1918									suspended due to the Great War
1919	4	4	0	0	141	6	8	1st	ORFU Championship, no playoffs
1920	4	3	1	0	60	35	6	1st	ORFU Championship, lost east final to Toronto Argonauts, 7-6
1921	3	0	3	0	21	54	0	3rd	
Totals	26	15	11	0	446	277	30		Three ORFU Championships, lost 7th Grey Cup
