= Chaucer Elliott =

Canadian sportsman, hockey official, and sports writer

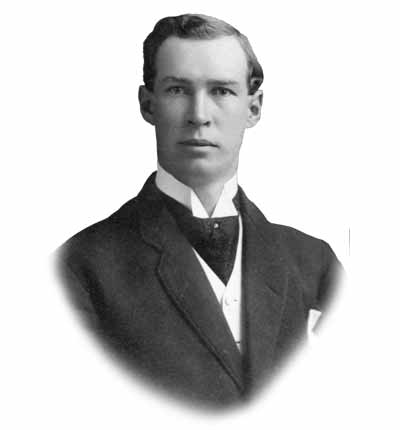
Chaucer Elliott

Edwin Smith "Chaucer" Elliott (August 20, 1878 – March 13, 1913) was a Canadian sportsman and a Hall of Fame referee and linesman. He was the grandfather of Bob Elliott, one of Canada's most respected sports writers.

== Early life and education ==
Born in Kingston, Ontario, Elliott played hockey and football at his hometown Queen's University. While studying arts and later medicine, he captained Queen's rugby and hockey team. He also played for the Kingston Granites, winners of the Canadian championship in 1899. It was while at Queen's that Elliott earned his nickname Chaucer, after Geoffrey Chaucer due to his expansive vocabulary. However, he left the university before graduating to organize a semi-professional baseball club in Kingston, Ontario.

== Career ==
In 1903, Elliott joined a Toronto baseball team that played within the Eastern League, and later moved to play in the New England League. While playing minor league baseball, he also began his career as a hockey referee with the Ontario Hockey Association. By 1906, Elliott began coaching the ORFU's Toronto Argonauts, where he was later appointed manager. The following year, he was hired as the coach for the Montreal AAA's Winged Wheelers and an advisor for the organization. He also managed the Oswego baseball team in the Empire League and attempted to organize an international baseball league.

Elliott resigned from the Montreal AAA Winged Wheelers position in 1911 to manage the St. Thomas Saints of the Canadian Baseball League. He also managed the Toronto Blueshirts of the National Hockey Association. This was shortlived however as he was diagnosed with an irreversible form of cancer in 1913 and died in his hometown Kingston at the age of 34.

In 1961 he was inducted into the Hockey Hall of Fame.
