= Peterborough Pets =

General information
- Founded: 1904; 122 years ago
- Folded: 1909; 117 years ago
- Headquartered: Peterborough, Ontario, Canada
- Colours: Unknown

League / conference affiliations
- Ontario Rugby Football Union

The Peterborough Pets were a Canadian football franchise in the early 20th century. They played in the Ontario Rugby Football Union. Their greatest success came in 1907 when they won the ORFU title and advanced to the Canadian Dominion Final. They were soundly defeated 75-10 by the Montreal Football Club in the final that year.
