= 9th Grey Cup =

1921 Canadian Football championship game

Edmonton Eskimos	Toronto Argonauts
0	23
Head coach: William "Deacon" White	Head coach: Sinc McEvenue
	1	2	3	4	Total
Edmonton Eskimos	0	0	0	0	0
Toronto Argonauts	10	4	7	2	23
- Date: December 3, 1921
- Stadium: Varsity Stadium
- Location: Toronto
- Attendance: 9,558

The 9th Grey Cup was played on December 3, 1921, before 9,558 fans at Toronto's Varsity Stadium. Edmonton was the first western team to challenge for the Grey Cup.

The Toronto Argonauts shut out the Edmonton Eskimos 23–0.
