= Kingston Granites =

Canadian football team in Ontario (1898–1901)

General information
- Founded: 1898; 128 years ago
- Folded: 1903; 123 years ago
- Stadium: K.A.A.A Grounds
- Headquartered: Kingston, Ontario, Canada
- Colours: Black and white

League / conference affiliations
- Quebec Rugby Football Union; Ontario Rugby Football Union

The Kingston Granites were a football team from Kingston, Ontario and a member of the Quebec Rugby Football Union and the Ontario Rugby Football Union, which were leagues that preceded the Canadian Football League. The team played for four seasons between 1898 and 1901 between the two leagues and while the team was slated to return in 1903, the team ultimately withdrew from the ORFU due to a player eligibility dispute.

== History ==
The Kingston Granites Rugby Football club began play in 1898 as a member of the then three team Quebec Rugby Football Union. After all three teams were tied with 2-2 records, the Granites were given the bye while Ottawa College defeated the Montreal Football Club in a playoff game. Before the QRFU title game against Ottawa, the Granites refused to play after it was made apparent that the game's referee used to play for Ottawa College. Consequently, Ottawa won the QFRU championship by default.

In 1899, the Granites joined the Ontario Rugby Football Union, replacing the Osgoode Hall team that had left to join the QRFU. The Granites finished tied for first place with the Ottawa Rough Riders and would challenge them for the ORFU championship game. Kingston came out victorious, winning 8-0, to claim the senior title over Ottawa in their first year of play. Because teams from both the ORFU and QRFU were unwilling to play a national title game that year, there was no Canadian Dominion Football Championship in 1899. The next couple of years would not be as successful, as the Granites would fall to 3rd place in the ORFU in 1900, and then to last place in 1901.

Disputes over the use of professional players would lead to the team sitting out the 1902 season, with the ORFU only allowing Toronto, Hamilton, and Ottawa to play that year. The following year, the ORFU schedule included seven teams competing in the league, including the Granites, but the same problems would arise. The Granites refused to play without Chaucer Elliott, who was labeled as a professional, and as such withdrew from competition. This would prove to be the last of the Kingston Granites in the Ontario Rugby Football Union.

== Seasons ==
Season	W	L	T	PF	PA	Pts	Finish	Playoffs
1898	2	2	0	80	54	10	1st, QRFU	Forfeit QRFU Title
1899	5	1	0	80	38	10	2nd, ORFU	Won ORFU Title
1900	3	3	0	26	71	6	3rd, ORFU	Missed playoffs
1901	1	5	0	8	89	0	4th, ORFU	Missed playoffs
