= Rosedale Field =

Field and former stadium in Toronto, Canada

Coordinates: 43°40′57″N 79°22′43″W

Rosedale Park
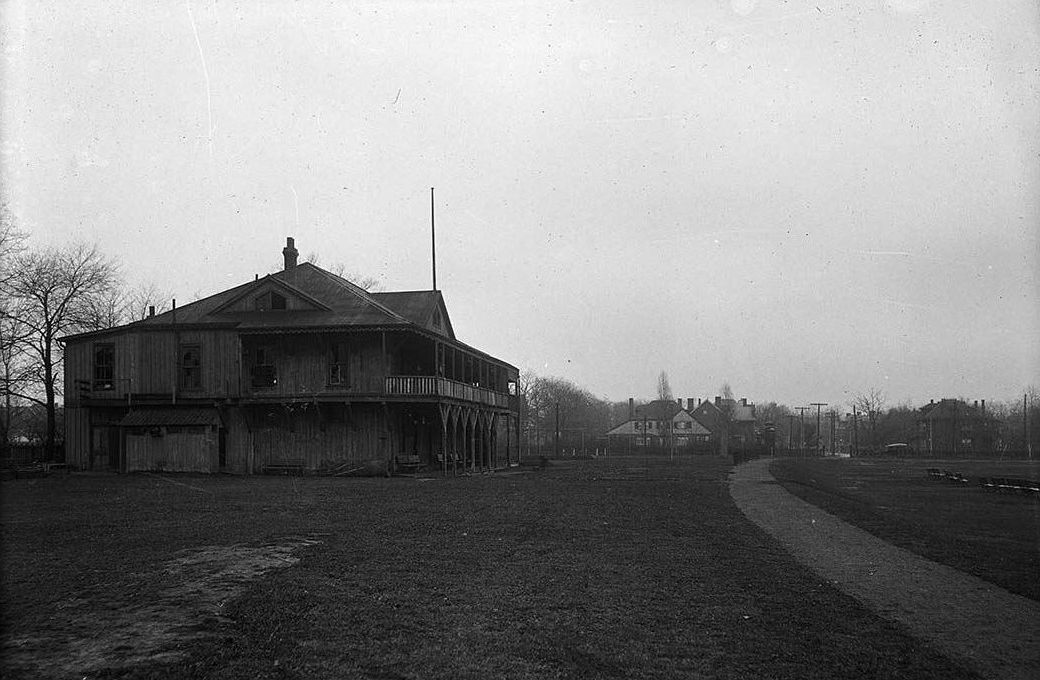
- Rosedale Field clubhouse in 1921

- Location in Toronto Location in Ontario Location in Canada
- Former names: Rosedale Field
- Address: 20 Scholfield Avenue, Toronto, Ontario; Canada
- Owner: City of Toronto, originally owned by Rosedale Golf Club
- Operator: Toronto Parks, Forestry & Recreation
- Capacity: 4,000 seated 10,000 seated and standing
- Surface: Grass

Construction
- Built: 1874

Tenants
- Toronto Argonauts (IRFU) 1874–1877, 1908–1915, 1919; Toronto Amateur Athletic Club 1908-1911 (ORFU); Toronto Rugby and Athletic Association 1912–1921 (ORFU)

Rosedale Field was a grandstand stadium located in Rosedale Park at 20 Scholfield Avenue, Toronto, Ontario, Canada.

Originally called the Toronto Lacrosse Grounds, it was linked to St. Andrew's College, located in the area west of MacLennan Avenue from Summerhill Avenue to Douglas Drive (now a residential area).

It could seat 4,000 spectators and could accommodate upwards of 10,000 standing. It was home to the Toronto Argonauts from 1874 to 1877, the Toronto Football Club/Toronto Athletic Club 1879–1897, and again from 1908 to 1915. It hosted the Canadian Dominion Football Championship game in 1892, 1894, 1896, 1900, 1905, and 1908.

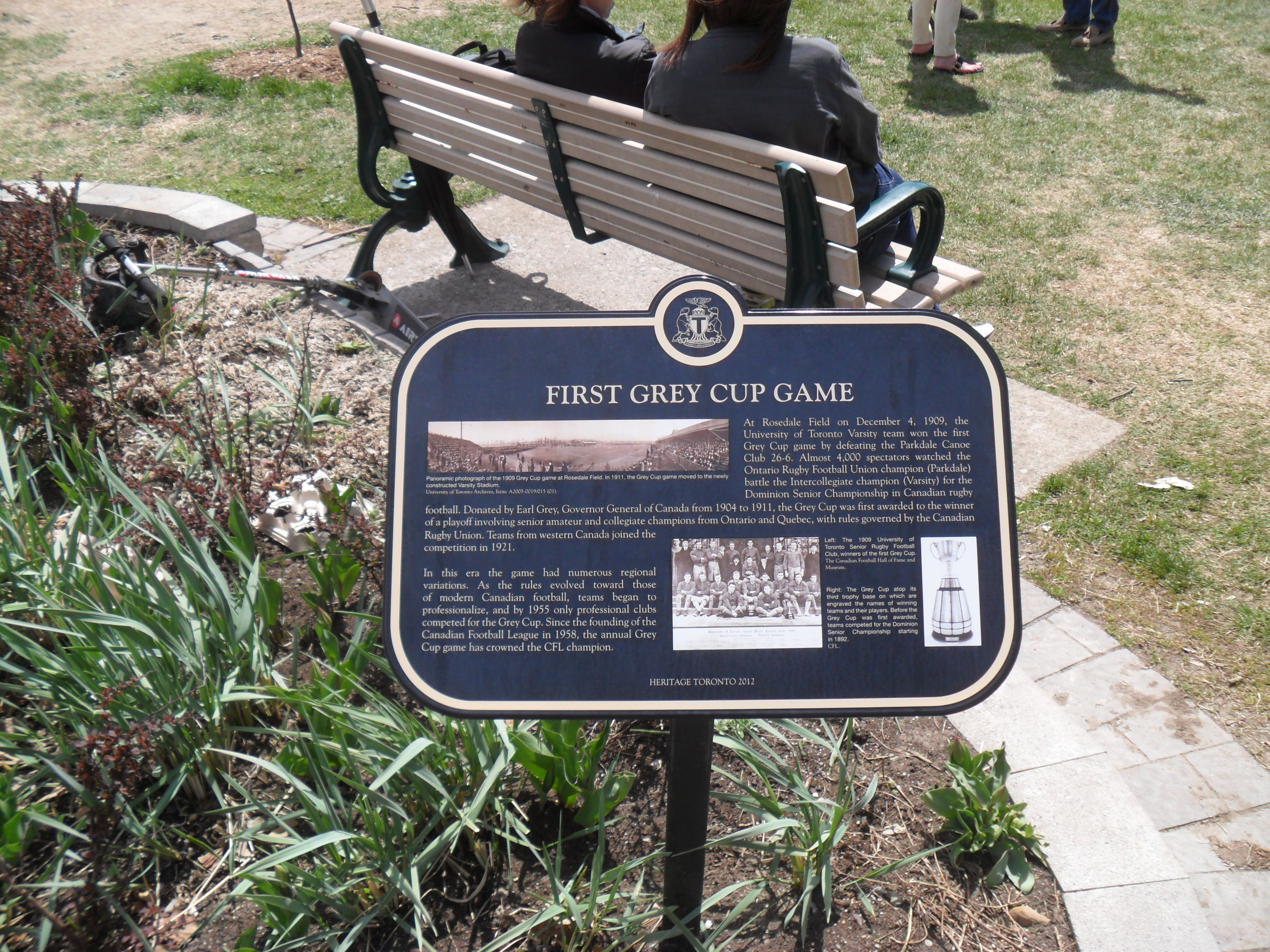
Plaque commemorating the first Grey Cup game

It is most famously known for hosting the first-ever Grey Cup game in 1909, when almost 4,000 fans witnessed the University of Toronto Varsity Blues defeat Toronto Parkdale by a score of 26–6.

The 3,400-seat stadium and field was originally owned by the Rosedale Golf Club (which lent its name to the park). The grandstand is no longer standing; however, the field is still there and is used for soccer. The namesake golf course moved out in 1909 as The Scottish Ontario and Manitoba Land Company re-developed the area for residential homes.

The current field is part of Rosedale Park, owned by the City of Toronto. The home of Rosedale Tennis Club is located in the northern portion of the park. An outdoor skating rink, two sets of tennis courts, a playground, wading pool, and a baseball field are also available in the park. Mooredale House uses the park for a soccer league and baseball league as well as a hockey league.

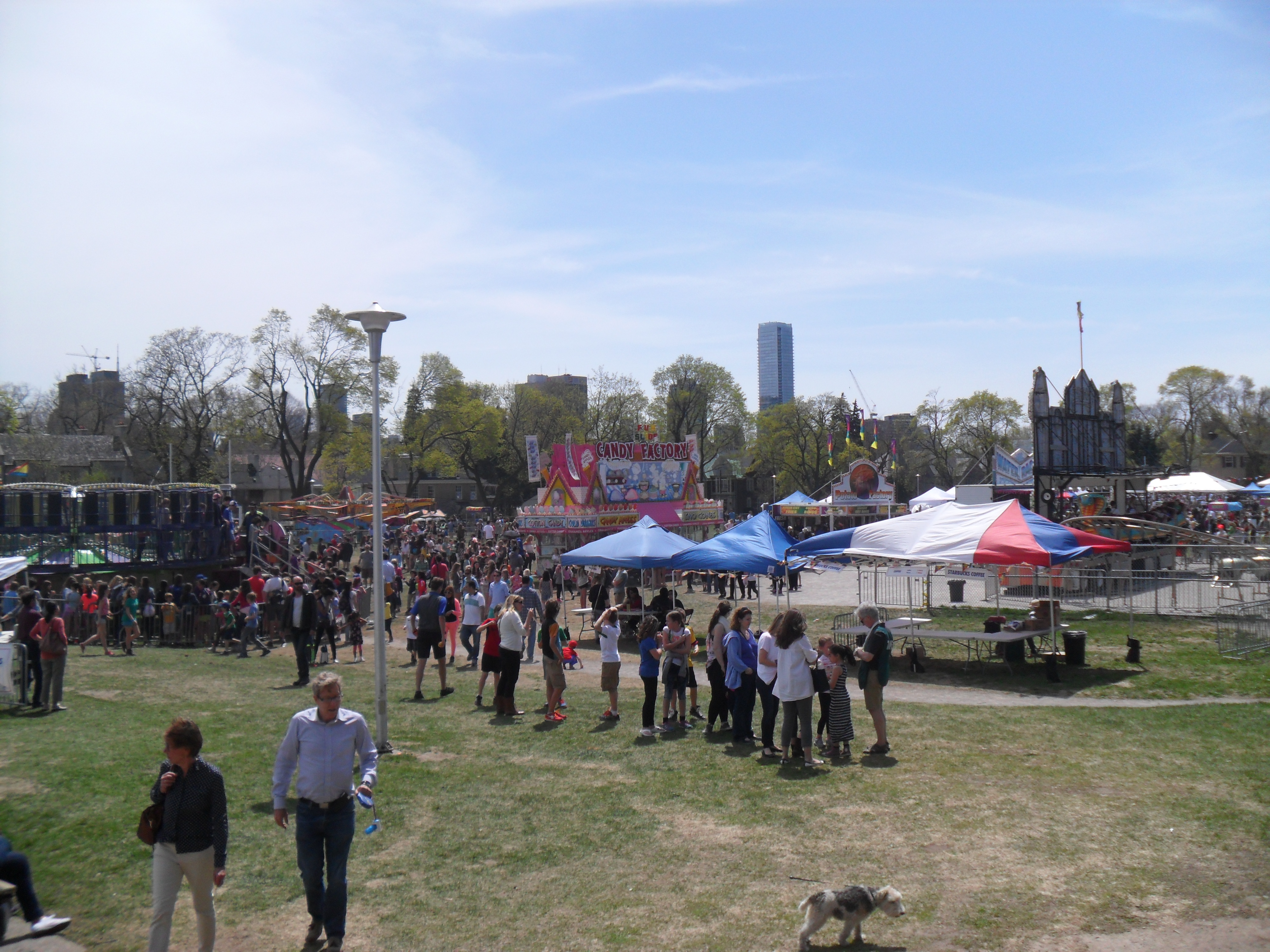
Mayfair at Rosedale Park

The field is also home to the annual spring park party, Mayfair. The event typically consists of rides, games, flea market, and other such carnival-type activities. The event is traditionally on the first Saturday in May. The event is run and funded by Mooredale House. Celebrations surrounding the 100th Grey Cup in 2012 began with the unveiling of a Heritage Toronto commemorative plaque at Rosedale Park.

== See also ==
- Centennial Park Stadium - City of Toronto
- Esther Shiner Stadium - City of Toronto
- Lamport Stadium - City of Toronto
- Monarch Park Stadium - Toronto District School Board
- Metro Toronto Track and Field Centre - City of Toronto
- Varsity Stadium - University of Toronto
- York Lions Stadium - York University

Events and tenants
Preceded by first stadium	Home of the Toronto Argonauts; 1874-1897	Succeeded by Varsity Stadium
Preceded by Varsity Stadium	Home of the Toronto Argonauts; 1908-1915	Succeeded by Varsity Stadium
