= 2025 Hamilton Tiger-Cats season =

CFL team season

- General manager: Ted Goveia (until Sep. 12); Vacant (since Sep. 12)
- President: Scott Mitchell
- Head coach: Scott Milanovich
- Home stadium: Hamilton Stadium

Results
- Record: 11–7
- Division place: 1st, East
- Playoffs: Lost East Final
- Team MOP: Bo Levi Mitchell
- Team MODP: Julian Howsare
- Team MOC: Marc Liegghio
- Team MOOL: Brandon Revenberg
- Team MOST: Marc Liegghio
- Team MOR: Devin Veresuk

Uniform
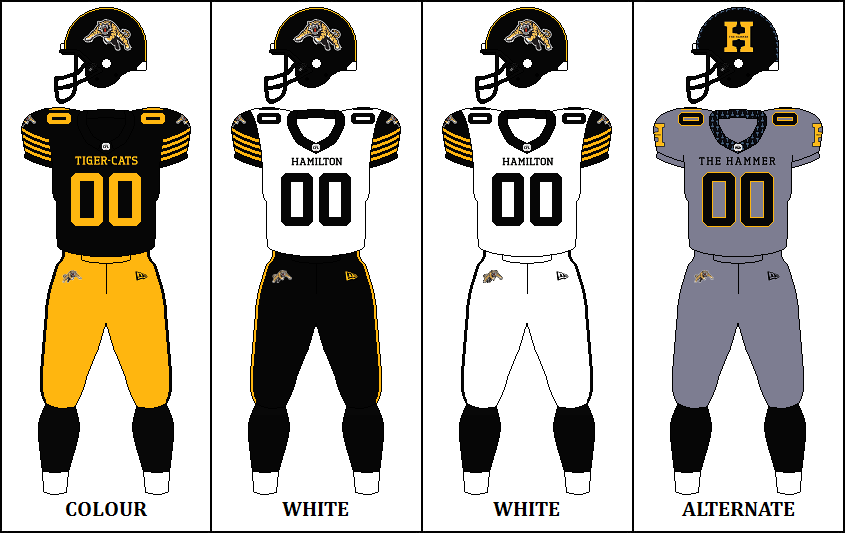

The 2025 Hamilton Tiger-Cats season was the 67th season for the team in the Canadian Football League (CFL) and their 75th overall. The Tiger-Cats improved upon their 7–11 record from 2024 after securing their eighth victory in week 15 against the Winnipeg Blue Bombers. The team clinched a playoff berth, following a one-year absence, in week 17 after a loss by the Toronto Argonauts. The Tiger-Cats attempted to win the ninth Grey Cup championship in franchise history, but were eliminated in the East Final by the Montreal Alouettes.

The 2025 CFL season is the second season under head coach Scott Milanovich. It was the first and only season with Ted Goveia as the team's general manager as he died on September 12, 2025, from cancer.

The Hamilton Tiger-Cats drew an average home attendance of 22,858, the 4th highest of all Canadian football teams in the world.

== Offseason ==
=== CFL global draft ===
The 2025 CFL global draft took place on April 29, 2025. The Tiger-Cats had two selections in the draft, holding the second pick in each round.

Round	Pick	Player	Position	School	Nationality
1	8	Josh Green	P	Oregon State	Australia
2	11	Maximilian Mang	TE	Syracuse	Germany

== CFL national draft ==
The 2025 CFL draft took place on April 29, 2025. The Tiger-Cats had eight selections in the eight-round draft. Not including traded picks, the team selected second in each round of the draft after finishing eighth in the 2024 league standings.

Round	Pick	Player	Position	School	Hometown
1	2	Devin Veresuk	LB	Windsor	Windsor, ON
2	9	Isaiah Bagnah	DL	Brigham Young	Lethbridge, AB
3	21	Arvin Hosseini	OL	British Columbia	North Vancouver, BC
3	28	Mack Bannatyne	DB	Alberta	Calgary, AB
4	36	Ty Anderson	DL	Alberta	Calgary, AB
6	48	Ronan Horrall	DB	British Columbia	Ottawa, ON
7	57	Jake Nitychoruk	DB	Manitoba	Winnipeg, MB
8	66	Nate Martey	DL	Arkansas State	Ottawa, ON

== Preseason ==
=== Schedule ===
Week	Game	Date	Kickoff	Opponent	Results		TV	Venue	Attendance	Summary
Week	Game	Date	Kickoff	Opponent	Score	Record	TV	Venue	Attendance	Summary
A	Bye									
B	1	Sat, May 24	7:00 p.m. EDT	vs. Toronto Argonauts	W 24–16	1–0	TSN2	Hamilton Stadium	17,411	Recap
C	2	Fri, May 30	7:00 p.m. EDT	at Toronto Argonauts	L 23–30	1–1	CFL+	Alumni Stadium	4,000	Recap

# Games played with colour uniforms.

== Regular season ==
=== Season standings ===
East Division
Team	GP	W	L	T	Pts	PF	PA	Div	Stk	
Hamilton Tiger-Cats	18	11	7	0	22	525	496	7–1	W1	Details
Montreal Alouettes	18	10	8	0	20	445	430	6–2	L1	Details
Toronto Argonauts	18	5	13	0	10	497	583	2–6	L5	Details
Ottawa Redblacks	18	4	14	0	8	417	537	1–7	L6	Details

=== Season schedule ===
Week	Game	Date	Kickoff	Opponent	Results		TV	Venue	Attendance	Summary
Week	Game	Date	Kickoff	Opponent	Score	Record	TV	Venue	Attendance	Summary
1	1	Sat, June 7	7:00 p.m. EDT	at Calgary Stampeders	L 26–38	0–1	TSN/CTV	McMahon Stadium	18,682	Recap
2	2	Sat, June 14	7:00 p.m. EDT	vs. Saskatchewan Roughriders	L 23–28	0–2	TSN/CTV/CBSSN	Hamilton Stadium	22,810	Recap
3	Bye									
4	3	Fri, June 27	7:30 p.m. EDT	vs. Montreal Alouettes	W 35–17	1–2	TSN/RDS	Hamilton Stadium	20,911	Recap
5	4	Fri, July 4	7:30 p.m. EDT	at Toronto Argonauts	W 51–38	2–2	TSN/RDS	BMO Field	12,701	Recap
6	5	Sat, July 12	7:00 p.m. EDT	vs. Ottawa Redblacks	W 23–20	3–2	TSN/CTV/RDS	Hamilton Stadium	22,913	Recap
7	6	Sun, July 20	7:00 p.m. EDT	at Ottawa Redblacks	W 30–15	4–2	TSN/RDS	TD Place Stadium	15,054	Recap
8	7	Sun, July 27	7:00 p.m. EDT	at BC Lions	W 37–33	5–2	TSN	BC Place	22,348	Recap
9	8	Sat, Aug 2	3:00 p.m. EDT	at Edmonton Elks	W 28–24	6–2	TSN/CTV	Commonwealth Stadium	18,337	Recap
10	9	Thu, Aug 7	7:30 p.m. EDT	vs. BC Lions	L 38–41 (OT)	6–3	TSN/RDS2/CBSSN	Hamilton Stadium	24,102	Recap
11	10	Sat, Aug 16	3:00 p.m. EDT	at Saskatchewan Roughriders	L 9–29	6–4	TSN/CTV/CBSSN	Mosaic Stadium	33,350	Recap
12	Bye									
13	11	Mon, Sept 1	2:30 p.m. EDT	vs. Toronto Argonauts	L 33–35	6–5	TSN/CBSSN	Hamilton Stadium	25,619	Recap
14	12	Sat, Sept 6	1:00 p.m. EDT	at Montreal Alouettes	W 26–9	7–5	TSN/RDS	Molson Stadium	20,612	Recap
15	13	Fri, Sept 12	7:00 p.m. EDT	vs. Winnipeg Blue Bombers	W 32–21	8–5	TSN/CBSSN	Hamilton Stadium	22,913	Recap
16	14	Sat, Sept 20	7:00 p.m. EDT	vs. Edmonton Elks	W 29–27	9–5	TSN/RDS2	Hamilton Stadium	22,114	Recap
17	15	Sat, Sept 27	3:00 p.m. EDT	at Winnipeg Blue Bombers	L 3–40	9–6	TSN/CTV	Princess Auto Stadium	32,343	Recap
18	16	Sat, Oct 4	3:00 p.m. EDT	at Toronto Argonauts	W 47–29	10–6	TSN/CTV	BMO Field	19,846	Recap
19	17	Sat, Oct 11	3:00 p.m. EDT	vs. Calgary Stampeders	L 20–37	10–7	TSN/CTV/RDS2	Hamilton Stadium	22,313	Recap
20	Bye									
21	18	Fri, Oct 24	7:00 p.m. EDT	vs. Ottawa Redblacks	W 35–15	11–7	TSN/RDS	Hamilton Stadium	22,030	Recap

# Games played with colour uniforms.
# Games played with white uniforms.
# Games played with alternate uniforms.

== Post-season ==
=== Schedule ===
Game	Date	Kickoff	Opponent	Results		TV	Venue	Attendance	Summary
Game	Date	Kickoff	Opponent	Score	Record	TV	Venue	Attendance	Summary
East Semi-Final	Sat, Nov 1	Bye							
East Final	Sat, Nov 8	3:00 p.m. ET	vs. Montreal Alouettes	L 16–19	0–1	TSN/CTV/RDS	Hamilton Stadium	25,399	Recap

# Games played with colour uniforms.

== Roster ==
2025 Hamilton Tiger-Cats final roster
**Quarterbacks**: 16 Jake Dolegala; 19 Bo Levi Mitchell; 7 Taylor Powell; **Running backs**: 27 Johnny Augustine; 5 Greg Bell; 34 Ante Milanovic-Litre; **Receivers**: 17 Shemar Bridges; 89 Kenny Lawler; 4 Brendan O'Leary-Orange; 84 Jevoni Robinson; 85 Kiondré Smith; 88 Tyler Ternowski; 12 Tim White; 11 Isaiah Wooden	**Offensive linemen**: 59 Quinton Barrow T; 66 Liam Dobson G; 69 Jordan Murray T; 57 Brandon Revenberg G; 50 Jakub Szott G/C; 64 Coulter Woodmansey C; **Defensive linemen**: 40 Ty Anderson DT; 95 Julian Howsare DE; 47 Owen Hubert DE; 90 Mario Kendricks DT; 46 Philip Ossai DE; 94 Jose Ramirez DE; 44 Casey Sayles DT	**Linebackers**: 36 Ryan Baker; 48 Daniel Bell; 41 Brian Cole; 43 Kyler Fisher; 38 Braxton Hill; 42 Trevor Hoyte; 49 Devin Veresuk; **Defensive backs**: 8 DaShaun Amos; 35 Ronan Horrall; 30 Stavros Katsantonis; 24 Robert Panabaker; 2 Jamal Peters; 1 Reggie Stubblefield; 25 Destin Talbert; 23 Quavian White	**Special teams**: 31 Nik Constantinou P/K; 33 Marc Liegghio K; 58 Gordon Whyte LS; **Practice roster**: 3 Kevin Brown RB; 92 Kail Dava DT; 81 Moochie Dixon WR; 15 Michael Domagala K/P; 83 Shedler Fervius WR; 79 Josh Green P; 45 Daniel Kwamou LB; 39 Ryan Meed LB; 14 Myron Mitchell WR; 20 Zamari Walton DB; 93 Phillip Webb DE	**Injured list**: 97 Isaiah Bagnah DE; 32 Mack Bannatyne DB; 53 Brendan Bordner T; 98 Luke Brubacher DE; 87 Keaton Bruggeling SB; 29 Patrick Burke DB; 61 Nathaniel Dumoulin Duguay C/G; 91 Miles Fox DT; 18 Harrison Frost QB; 9 TyJuan Garbutt DE; 60 Arvin Hosseini G; 6 Jonathan Moxey DB; 54 Brayden Swartout T; 82 Drew Wolitarsky SB; 37 Lawrence Woods DB; **Suspended list**: 51 Marquise Copeland DT; 67 Nicolas Melsop T; 62 Darrin Paulo T
Italics indicate American player • **Bold** indicates Global player

== Coaching staff ==
Hamilton Tiger-Cats staff
Front office: Caretaker – Bob Young; Chief Executive Officer – Scott Mitchell; President and Chief Operating Officer – Matt Afinec; President of football operations – Orlondo Steinauer; General manager – Ted Goveia; Director of player personnel – Cyril Penn; Director of scouting – Alex Russell; Director of pro scouting – Dane Vandernat; Director of football operations – C. J. Paduano; Manager of football operations – Nick Roberto; Video Co-ordinator – Matt Allemang; Head coach: Head Coach – Scott Milanovich; Offensive coaches: Offensive Coordinator – Scott Milanovich; Quarterbacks – Jarryd Baines; Offensive Line – Brendan Walsh; Running Backs – James Tuck; Receivers – Naaman Roosevelt; Offensive Quality Control – Myer Spitulnik	Defensive coaches: Defensive Coordinator – Brent Monson; Defensive Line – Casey Creehan; Linebackers – Elijah Sandweiss; Defensive Backs – Brandon Isaac; Special teams coaches: Special Teams Coordinator – Dennis McKnight; Assistant Special Teams – James Tuck; Assistant Special Teams – Elijah Sandweiss; Strength and conditioning: Strength and Conditioning Coach – Marcellus Bowman; → Coaching staff
