= 2026 Hamilton Tiger-Cats season =

CFL team season

- General manager: Orlondo Steinauer (de facto)
- President: Scott Mitchell
- Head coach: Scott Milanovich
- Home stadium: Hamilton Stadium

Results
- Record: 6–12
- Division place: 3rd, East
- Playoffs: Did not qualify
- Team MOP: Reggie Stubblefield
- Team MODP: Reggie Stubblefield
- Team MOC: Kiondré Smith
- Team MOOL: Brandon Revenberg
- Team MOST: Marc Liegghio
- Team MOR: Jordan Crook

Uniform
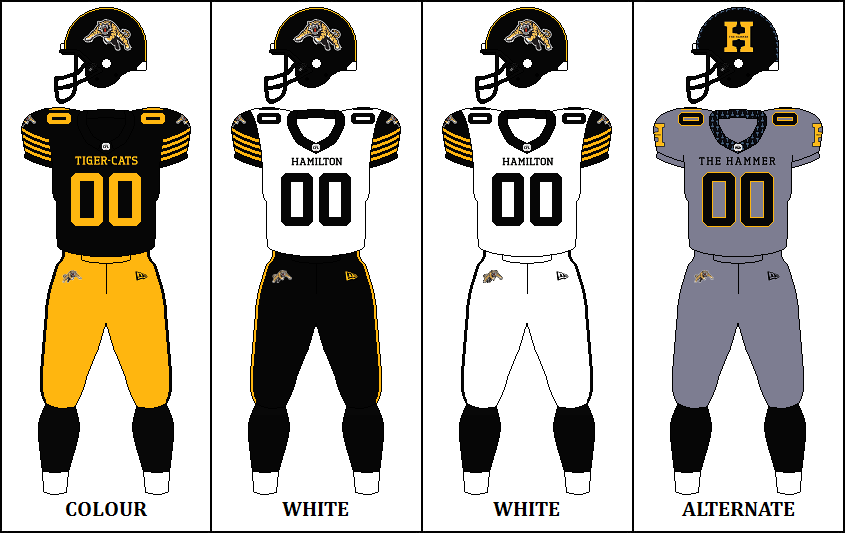

The 2026 Hamilton Tiger-Cats season was the 68th season for the team in the Canadian Football League (CFL) and their 76th overall. The Tiger-Cats were eliminated from playoff contention following their week 17 overtime loss to the Edmonton Elks. The team played ten home games this season with the Toronto Argonauts deferring one of their home games due to the 2026 FIFA World Cup.

The 2026 CFL season was the third season under head coach Scott Milanovich. It was also the first season with Orlondo Steinauer as the de facto general manager after the team's incumbent, Ted Goveia, died last season.

== Offseason ==
=== CFL national draft ===
The 2026 CFL draft took place on April 28, 2026. The Tiger-Cats had eight selections in the eight-round draft. Not including traded picks or forfeitures, the team selected fifth in each round of the draft after finishing fourth in the 2025 league standings.

Round	Pick	Player	Position	University team
1	5	Jonathan Denis	OL	Louisiana Tech
2	14	Malick Meiga	WR	Coastal Carolina
3	25	Devynn Cromwell	DB	Michigan State
4	34	Brayden Szeman	OL	Calgary
5	43	Loik Gagne	LB	Concordia
6	52	Marc Djonay Rondeu	LB	Ottawa
7	61	Aamarii Notice	DL	Coastal Carolina
8	70	Kyler Laing	LB	Mercyhurst

=== CFL global draft ===
The 2026 CFL global draft took place on April 29, 2026. The Tiger-Cats had two selections in the draft, holding the fifth pick in each round.

Round	Pick	Player	Position	School	Nationality
1	5	Nick Haberer	P	Vanderbilt	Australia
2	14	Mitch McCarthy	P	Indiana	Australia

== Preseason ==
=== Schedule ===
Week	Game	Date	Kickoff	Opponent	Results		TV	Venue	Attendance	Summary
Week	Game	Date	Kickoff	Opponent	Score	Record	TV	Venue	Attendance	Summary
A	Bye									
B	1	Sat, May 23	4:00 p.m. EDT	vs. Toronto Argonauts	L 10–20	0–1	TSN	Hamilton Stadium	N/A	Recap
C	2	Fri, May 29	7:00 p.m. EDT	at Toronto Argonauts	W 20–14	1–1	CFL+	Alumni Stadium	N/A	Recap

# Games played with colour uniforms.

== Regular season ==
=== Season standings ===
East Division
Team	GP	W	L	Pts	PF	PA	Div	Stk	
Montreal Alouettes	18	14	4	28	624	476	8–0	W1	Details
Toronto Argonauts	18	9	9	18	517	528	4–4	L3	Details
Hamilton Tiger-Cats	18	6	12	12	443	523	3–5	W1	Details
Ottawa Redblacks	18	1	17	2	437	673	1–7	L1	Details

=== Schedule ===
Week	Game	Date	Kickoff	Opponent	Results		TV	Venue	Attendance	Summary
Week	Game	Date	Kickoff	Opponent	Score	Record	TV	Venue	Attendance	Summary
1	1	Thu, June 4	7:30 p.m. EDT	vs. Montreal Alouettes	L 27–30 (OT)	0–1	TSN/RDS/CBSSN	Hamilton Stadium	18,577	Recap
2	2	Thu, June 11	8:30 p.m. EDT	at Winnipeg Blue Bombers	W 37–27	1–1	TSN/RDS2/CBSSN	Princess Auto Stadium	32,343	Recap
3	3	Fri, June 19	7:30 p.m. EDT	vs. BC Lions	W 41–27	2–1	TSN	Hamilton Stadium	20,402	Recap
4	Bye									
5	4	Sun, July 5	7:00 p.m. EDT	vs. Winnipeg Blue Bombers	L 13–14	2–2	TSN/CBSSN	Hamilton Stadium	20,189	Recap
6	5	Sun, July 12	7:00 p.m. EDT	at Saskatchewan Roughriders	L 7–38	2–3	TSN/CBSSN	Mosaic Stadium	25,476	Recap
7	6	Sat, July 18	7:30 p.m. EDT	vs. Toronto Argonauts	W 24–23	3–3	TSN/CBSSN	Hamilton Stadium	21,262	Recap
8	7	Sun, July 26	7:00 p.m. EDT	at Montreal Alouettes	L 18–31	3–4	TSN/RDS/CBSSN	Molson Stadium	21,014	Recap
9	8	Sat, Aug 1	3:00 p.m. EDT	vs. Calgary Stampeders	L 20–44	3–5	TSN/CTV	Hamilton Stadium	20,026	Recap
10	9	Sat, Aug 8	7:00 p.m. EDT	at BC Lions	L 24–27	3–6	TSN/CBSSN	BC Place	19,387	Recap
11	10	Sat, Aug 15	7:00 p.m. EDT	vs. Saskatchewan Roughriders	W 26–19	4–6	TSN/CBSSN	Hamilton Stadium	20,791	Recap
12	11	Sat, Aug 22	7:00 p.m. EDT	at Toronto Argonauts	L 20–39	4–7	TSN/CBSSN	BMO Field	18,842	Recap
13	12	Sat, Aug 29	3:00 p.m. EDT	at Calgary Stampeders	L 23–28	4–8	TSN/RDS2/CTV	McMahon Stadium	19,855	Recap
14	13	Mon, Sept 7	2:30 p.m. EDT	vs. Toronto Argonauts	L 22–37	4–9	TSN/RDS2/CBSSN	Hamilton Stadium	25,274	Recap
15	Bye									
16	14	Fri, Sept 18	7:30 p.m. EDT	vs. Montreal Alouettes	L 25–37	4–10	TSN/RDS/CBSSN	Hamilton Stadium	18,078	Recap
17	15	Sat, Sept 26	7:00 p.m. EDT	at Edmonton Elks	L 35–37 (3OT)	4–11	TSN	Commonwealth Stadium	20,036	Recap
18	16	Fri, Oct 2	7:00 p.m. EDT	at Ottawa Redblacks	W 34–16	5–11	TSN/RDS2	TD Place Stadium	15,308	Recap
19	17	Fri, Oct 9	7:00 p.m. EDT	vs. Edmonton Elks	L 12–27	5–12	TSN	Hamilton Stadium	18,774	Recap
20	Bye									
21	18	Sat, Oct 24	3:00 p.m. EDT	vs. Ottawa Redblacks	W 35–22	6–12	TSN/RDS2	Hamilton Stadium	21,449	Recap

# Games played with colour uniforms.
# Games played with white uniforms.
# Games played with alternate uniforms.

== Team ==
=== Roster ===
Hamilton Tiger-Cats roster
**Quarterbacks**: 16 Jake Dolegala; 5 Tre Ford; 4 Cameron Peters; **Receivers**: 87 Jaelen Gill; 14 Kurleigh Gittens Jr.; 89 Kenny Lawler; 7 Myron Mitchell; 85 Kiondré Smith; 88 Tyler Ternowski; 11 Isaiah Wooden WR/KR; **Running backs**: 27 Johnny Augustine; 37 Larry Rountree III; **Fullbacks**: 44 Daniel Bell; 34 Ante Milanovic-Litre	**Offensive linemen**: 53 Jonathan Denis; 66 Liam Dobson; 61 Nathaniel Dumoulin Duguay; 56 Trevor Reid; 57 Brandon Revenberg; 54 Brayden Swartout; 50 Jakub Szott; **Defensive linemen**: 45 Mitchell Agude; 0 Isaiah Bagnah; 79 De'Jon Benton; 96 Charbel Dabire; 47 Owen Hubert; 22 Mario Kendricks Jr.; 46 Philip Ossai; 77 Brian Ugwu	**Linebackers**: 36 Ryan Baker; 32 Jordan Crook; 38 Braxton Hill; 48 Wynton McManis; **Defensive backs**: 20 Devodric Bynum; 23 Devynn Cromwell; 30 Stavros Katsantonis; 29 Jake Nitychoruk; 24 Robert Panabaker; 1 Reggie Stubblefield; 25 Destin Talbert; 6 Zamari Walton; 3 Quavian White; **Special teams**: 33 Marc Liegghio K; 31 Nik Constantinou P; 58 Gordon Whyte LS	**Reserve**: 35 Ronan Horrall DB; 93 Aamarii Notice DL; **1-game injured**: 18 Harrison Frost QB; 91 Miles Fox DL; 97 Trajan Jeffcoat DL; 82 Maximilian Mang TE; 2 Jamal Peters DB; 50 Brayden Szeman OL; 8 Keric Wheatfall WR; **6-game injured**: 59 Quinton Barrow OL; 43 Loik Gagne LB; 83 Tyson Middlemost WR; 19 Bo Levi Mitchell QB	**Practice roster**: 41 Nahree Biggins RB; 42 Jayden Griffiths LB; 81 Hakeem Harris WR; 12 Kaleb Hayes DB; 69 Noah Henderson OL; 70 Mitch McCarthy P; 39 Robert McDaniel DB; 49 Daveren Rayner LB; 13 Blayne Taylor WR; 51 Reuben Unije OL; **Suspended**: 92 Brandon Brown DL; 51 Marquise Copeland DL; -- Branson Deen DL; 67 Nicolas Melsop OL; 62 Darrin Paulo OL
Italics indicate American player • **Bold** indicates Global player • 45 Roster, 2 Reserve, 11 injured, 10 Practice, 5 Suspended; Roster updated 2026-10-23 • Depth chart • Transactions • More CFL rosters

=== Coaching staff ===
Hamilton Tiger-Cats staff
**Front office**: Caretaker – Bob Young; Chief executive officer – Scott Mitchell; President and chief operating officer – Matt Afinec; President of football operations – Orlondo Steinauer; Senior director of player personnel – Brock Sunderland; Assistant general manager – Alex Russell; Director of player personnel – Cyril Penn; Director of U.S. scouting – Dane Vandernat; Director of Canadian scouting – Tom Flaxman; Director of football operations – C. J. Paduano; Manager of football operations – Nick Roberto; Video Co-ordinator – Matt Allemang; **Head coaches**: Head Coach – Scott Milanovich; Assistant Head Coach – Bob Dyce; **Offensive coaches**: Offensive Coordinator and Quarterbacks – Jarryd Baines; Offensive Line – Brendan Walsh; Receivers – Naaman Roosevelt; Running Backs and Offensive Quality Control – Myer Spitulnik	**Defensive coaches**: Defensive Coordinator – Brent Monson; Defensive Line – Casey Creehan; Linebackers – Elijah Sandweiss; Defensive Backs – Brandon Isaac; **Special teams coaches**: Special Teams Coordinator – Bob Dyce; Co-Special Teams Coordinator – James Tuck; Assistant Special Teams – Elijah Sandweiss; **Strength and conditioning**: Strength and Conditioning Coach – Marcellus Bowman; → Coaching Staff → More CFL staffs
