= 2024 Hamilton Tiger-Cats season =

CFL team season

- General manager: Ed Hervey
- President: Scott Mitchell
- Head coach: Scott Milanovich
- Home stadium: Tim Hortons Field

Results
- Record: 7–11
- Division place: 4th, East
- Playoffs: Did not qualify
- Team MOP: Bo Levi Mitchell
- Team MODP: Jamal Peters
- Team MOC: Kiondré Smith
- Team MOOL: Brandon Revenberg
- Team MOST: Marc Liegghio
- Team MOR: Shemar Bridges

Uniform
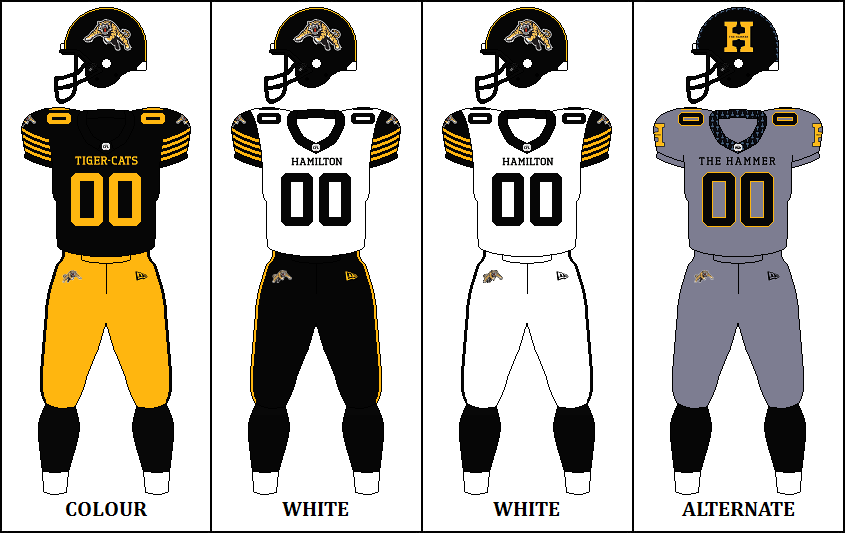

The 2024 Hamilton Tiger-Cats season was the 66th season for the team in the Canadian Football League (CFL) and their 74th overall. The Tiger-Cats failed to qualify for the playoffs when the Toronto Argonauts clinched the final spot in the East on October 11.

The 2024 CFL season was the first season under head coach Scott Milanovich and the first under general manager Ed Hervey. The team's former head coach, Orlondo Steinauer, continued as the president of football operations, which was his third season in that role.

The Tiger-Cats drew an average home attendance of 22,001 in 2024.

== Offseason ==
=== CFL global draft ===
The 2024 CFL global draft took place on April 30, 2024. The Tiger-Cats had two picks in the draft, selecting fifth in each round.

Round	Pick	Player	Position	Club/School	Nationality
1	5	Nik Constantinou	P	Texas A&M	Australia
2	14	Thomas Yassmin	TE	Utah	Australia

== CFL national draft ==
The 2024 CFL draft took place on April 30, 2024. The Tiger-Cats are scheduled to have eight selections in the eight-round draft. Not including traded picks, the team selected fifth in each round of the draft after finishing fifth in the 2023 league standings.

Round	Pick	Player	Position	University Team	Hometown
1	7	Nathaniel Dumoulin-Duguay	OL	Laval	Rimouski, QC
2	16	Luke Brubacher	DL	Wilfrid Laurier	Listowel, ON
4	34	Daniel Bell	DB	Mount Allison	Saint John, NB
4	36	Matthew Peterson	RB	Alberta	Brooks, AB
5	43	Ryan Baker	LB	British Columbia	Vancouver, BC
6	52	Jonathan Giustini	DB	Alberta	Calgary, AB
7	61	John Kourtis	OL	Saskatchewan	Toronto, ON
8	70	Mitchell Townsend	LB	British Columbia	North Vancouver, BC

== Preseason ==
=== Schedule ===
Week	Game	Date	Kickoff	Opponent	Results		TV	Venue	Attendance	Summary
Week	Game	Date	Kickoff	Opponent	Score	Record	TV	Venue	Attendance	Summary
A	Bye									
B	1	Sat, May 25	2:00 p.m. EDT	vs. Ottawa Redblacks	L 22–31	0–1	CFL+	Tim Hortons Field	N/A	Recap
C	2	Fri, May 31	7:00 p.m. EDT	at Toronto Argonauts	L 14–25	0–2	CFL+	Alumni Stadium	N/A	Recap

# Games played with colour uniforms.

== Regular season ==
=== Season standings ===
East Division
Team	GP	W	L	T	Pts	PF	PA	Div	Stk	
Montreal Alouettes	18	12	5	1	25	455	404	6–2	L2	Details
Toronto Argonauts	18	10	8	0	20	513	479	3–5	L1	Details
Ottawa Redblacks	18	9	8	1	19	443	488	3–5	W1	Details
Hamilton Tiger-Cats	18	7	11	0	14	495	557	4–4	L1	Details

=== Season schedule ===
Week	Game	Date	Kickoff	Opponent	Results		TV	Venue	Attendance	Summary
Week	Game	Date	Kickoff	Opponent	Score	Record	TV	Venue	Attendance	Summary
1	1	Fri, June 7	9:00 p.m. EDT	at Calgary Stampeders	L 24–32	0–1	TSN	McMahon Stadium	19,742	Recap
2	2	Sun, June 16	7:00 p.m. EDT	vs. Saskatchewan Roughriders	L 30–33	0–2	TSN/CBSSN	Tim Hortons Field	22,313	Recap
3	3	Sun, June 23	7:00 p.m. EDT	at Saskatchewan Roughriders	L 20–36	0–3	TSN/CBSSN	Mosaic Stadium	24,875	Recap
4	4	Sun, June 30	7:00 p.m. EDT	at Ottawa Redblacks	L 22–24	0–4	TSN/RDS/CBSSN	TD Place Stadium	20,315	Recap
5	5	Sun, July 7	7:00 p.m. EDT	vs. BC Lions	L 28–44	0–5	TSN/CBSSN	Tim Hortons Field	20,210	Recap
6	Bye									
7	6	Sat, July 20	7:00 p.m. EDT	vs. Toronto Argonauts	W 27–24	1–5	TSN/RDS2/CBSSN	Tim Hortons Field	22,910	Recap
8	7	Sun, July 28	7:00 p.m. EDT	at Edmonton Elks	W 44–28	2–5	TSN/CBSSN	Commonwealth Stadium	17,079	Recap
9	8	Fri, Aug 2	7:30 p.m. EDT	vs. Montreal Alouettes	L 16–33	2–6	TSN/RDS/CBSSN	Tim Hortons Field	20,426	Recap
10	9	Sat, Aug 10	7:00 p.m. EDT	at Montreal Alouettes	L 23–33	2–7	TSN/RDS/CBSSN	Molson Stadium	22,137	Recap
11	10	Sat, Aug 17	7:00 p.m. EDT	vs. Edmonton Elks	L 22–47	2–8	TSN/RDS/CBSSN	Tim Hortons Field	20,092	Recap
12	11	Fri, Aug 23	8:30 p.m. EDT	at Winnipeg Blue Bombers	L 23–26	2–9	TSN/RDS/CBSSN	Princess Auto Stadium	32,343	Recap
13	12	Mon, Sept 2	2:30 p.m. EDT	vs. Toronto Argonauts	W 31–28	3–9	TSN/RDS2/CBSSN	Tim Hortons Field	25,291	Recap
14	Bye									
15	13	Sat, Sept 14	3:00 p.m. EDT	vs. Ottawa Redblacks	W 37–21	4–9	CTV/RDS2	Tim Hortons Field	22,119	Recap
16	14	Fri, Sept 20	7:00 p.m. EDT	at Toronto Argonauts	W 33–31	5–9	TSN/RDS	BMO Field	18,210	Recap
17	15	Fri, Sept 27	10:30 p.m. EDT	at BC Lions	W 32–29 (2OT)	6–9	TSN	BC Place	22,583	Recap
18	16	Fri, Oct 4	7:00 p.m. EDT	vs. Winnipeg Blue Bombers	L 10–31	6–10	TSN/RDS	Tim Hortons Field	22,241	Recap
19	Bye									
20	17	Fri, Oct 18	7:00 p.m. EDT	vs. Calgary Stampeders	W 42–20	7–10	TSN/CBSSN	Tim Hortons Field	22,410	Recap
21	18	Fri, Oct 25	7:00 p.m. EDT	at Ottawa Redblacks	L 31–37	7–11	TSN/RDS2	TD Place Stadium	19,689	Recap

# Games played with colour uniforms.
# Games played with white uniforms.
# Games played with alternate uniforms.

== Roster ==
2024 Hamilton Tiger-Cats final roster
**Quarterbacks**: 19 Bo Levi Mitchell; 7 Taylor Powell; 1 Taulia Tagovailoa; **Running backs**: 5 Greg Bell; 34 Ante Milanovic-Litre; 49 Jevoni Robinson; 40 James Tuck; **Receivers**: 6 Steven Dunbar; 4 Brendan O'Leary-Orange; 76 Dezmon Patmon; 85 Kiondré Smith; 88 Tyler Ternowski; 12 Tim White; 80 Isaiah Wooden	**Offensive linemen**: 51 David Beard C; 53 Brendan Bordner T; 63 Nathaniel Dumoulin Duguay T; 65 Evan Johnson G/C; 69 Jordan Murray T; 57 Brandon Revenberg G; 64 Coulter Woodmansey G; **Defensive linemen**: 11 Brandon Barlow DE; 8 Dewayne Hendrix DT; 94 Trevon Mason DT; 56 David Ménard DE; 44 Casey Sayles DT; 75 Nick Usher DT	**Linebackers**: 36 Ryan Baker; 48 Daniel Bell; 42 Trevor Hoyte; 20 D. Q. Thomas; 0 Ray Wilborn; 15 Kyle Wilson; **Defensive backs**: 28 Siriman Bagayogo; 29 Patrick Burke; 30 Stavros Katsantonis; 23 Richard Leonard; 27 Jonathan Moxey; 24 Robert Panabaker; 22 Will Sunderland; 26 Destin Talbert; 37 Lawrence Woods	**Special teams**: 31 Nik Constantinou P; 33 Marc Liegghio K; 58 Gordon Whyte LS; **Practice roster**: 3 Cameron Dantzler DB; 18 Harrison Frost QB; 82 Odieu Hiliare WR; 66 Brandon Kemp T; 93 Mario Kendricks DT; 96 Deionte Knight DT; 95 Reece Martin DT; 86 Justin Marshall WR	**Injured list**: 60 Quinton Barrow T; 17 Shemar Bridges WR; 98 Luke Brubacher DE; 9 James Butler RB; 39 Nic Cross LB; 61 Joel Figueroa T; 38 Félix Garand-Gauthier FB; 81 Luther Hakunavanhu SB; 74 Enock Makonzo LB; 45 Penei Pavihi LB; 2 Jamal Peters DB; **Suspended list**: -- Cameron Batson WR; -- Shabari Davis DB; 43 Carthell Flowers-Lloyd DB
Italics indicate American player • **Bold** indicates Global player

== Coaching staff ==
Hamilton Tiger-Cats staff
Front office: Caretaker – Bob Young; Chief Executive Officer – Scott Mitchell; President and Chief Operating Officer – Matt Afinec; President of football operations – Orlondo Steinauer; General manager – Ed Hervey; Assistant general manager and director of Canadian scouting – Drew Allemang; Assistant general manager and director of player personnel – Spencer Zimmerman; Assistant director of player personnel – Spencer Boehm; Director of football administration and operations – Tamara Hinic; Video Co-ordinator – Matt Allemang; Assistant Video Co-ordinator – Nick Roberto; Head coach: Head Coach/Offensive Coordinator – Scott Milanovich; Offensive coaches: Quarterbacks – Jarryd Baines; Offensive Line – Mike Gibson; Running backs – Calvin McCarty; Receivers – Naaman Roosevelt; Offensive quality control – Myer Spitulnik	Defensive coaches: Senior Defensive Consultant – Chris Jones; Defensive Line – Glen Young; Linebackers – Michael Fletcher; Defensive Backs – Brandon Isaac; Special teams coaches: Special Teams Coordinator – Dennis McKnight; Special Teams Assistant – Alex Penz; Strength and conditioning: Strength and Conditioning Coach – Marcellus Bowman; → Coaching staff
