= Jake Dolegala =

American gridiron football player (born 1996)

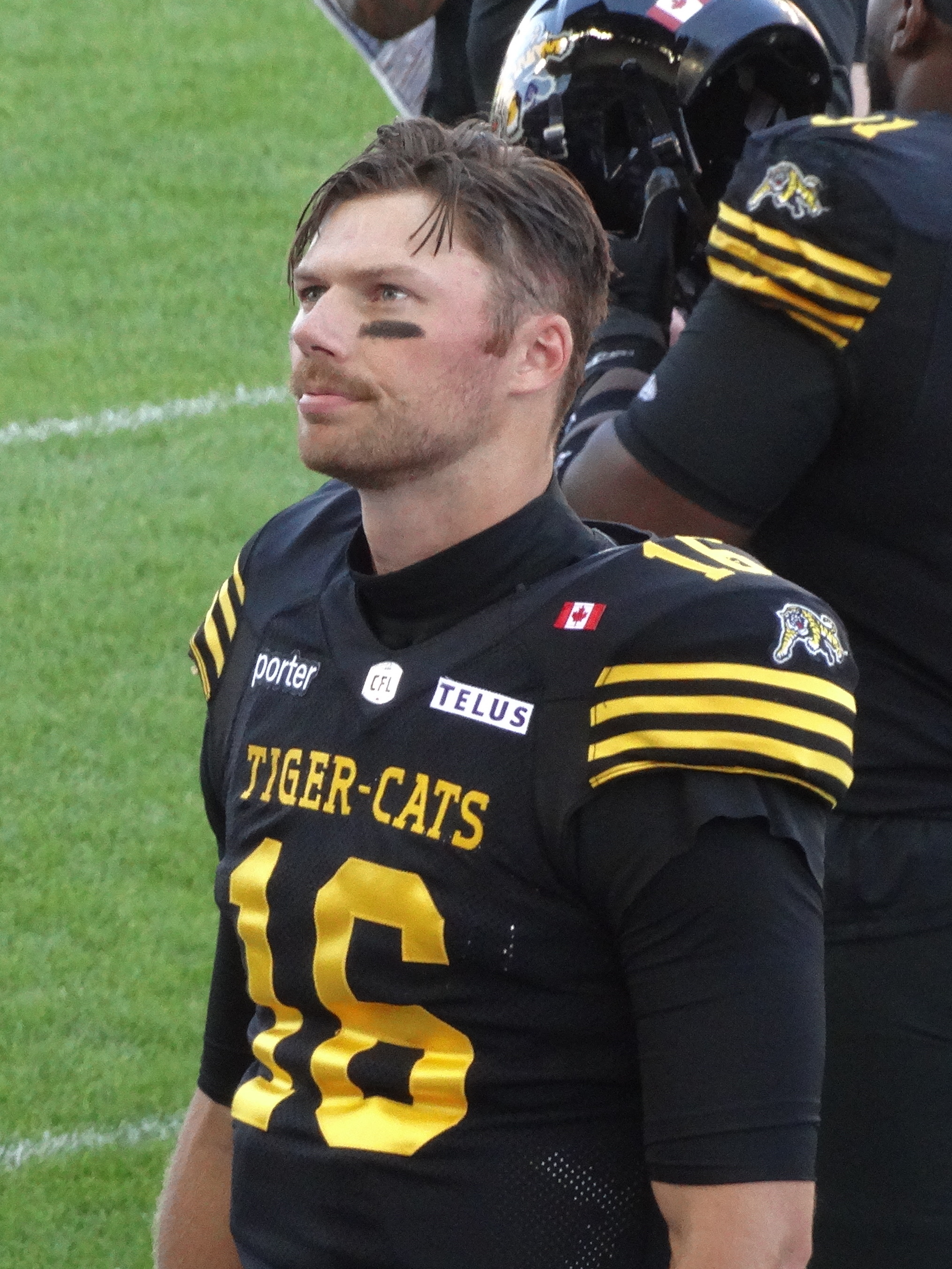
- Dolegala with the Hamilton Tiger-Cats in 2025

No. 15 – Hamilton Tiger-Cats
- Position: Quarterback
- Roster status: Active
- CFL status: American

Personal information
- Born: October 7, 1996 (age 30); Hamburg, New York, U.S.
- Listed height: 6 ft 7 in (2.01 m)
- Listed weight: 242 lb (110 kg)

Career information
- High school: Saint Francis (NY)
- College: Central Connecticut
- NFL draft: 2019: undrafted

Career history
- Cincinnati Bengals (2019); New England Patriots (2020)*; Green Bay Packers (2021)*; New England Patriots (2021)*; Green Bay Packers (2021)*; Miami Dolphins (2021)*; Saskatchewan Roughriders (2022–2023); BC Lions (2024); Winnipeg Blue Bombers (2024); Hamilton Tiger-Cats (2025–present)
- * Offseason or practice squad member only

Career CFL statistics as of 2026
- Passing completions: 264
- Passing attempts: 427
- Passing yards: 3,075
- TD–INT: 12–13
- Stats at CFL.ca
- Stats at Pro Football Reference

Jake Dolegala (born October 7, 1996) is an American professional football quarterback for the Hamilton Tiger-Cats of the Canadian Football League (CFL). He played college football at Central Connecticut, and signed with the Cincinnati Bengals as an undrafted free agent in 2019. He has also been a member of the New England Patriots, Green Bay Packers, Miami Dolphins, Saskatchewan Roughriders, BC Lions, and Winnipeg Blue Bombers.

== College career ==
Coming out of high school, Dolegala only had one college offer. This led him to attend Milford Academy for their 2014 season, where he threw for 2,276 yards and 20 touchdowns.

Dolegala was recruited to play at Central after his year at the Milford Academy. In his first year for the Blue Devils he appeared in 10 games and had seven passing touchdowns and three rushing. Dolegala was a four-year starter for the Central Connecticut Blue Devils, where he threw for 8,129 yards and 48 touchdowns.

== Professional career ==
Pre-draft measurables
Height	Weight	Arm length	Hand span	Wingspan	40-yard dash	10-yard split	20-yard split	20-yard shuttle	Three-cone drill	Vertical jump	Broad jump
6 ft 6 5/8 in (2.00 m)	242 lb (110 kg)	34 1/8 in (0.87 m)	11 1/8 in (0.28 m)	6 ft 10 5/8 in (2.10 m)	5.04 s	1.70 s	2.80 s	4.57 s	7.22 s	31.5 in (0.80 m)	9 ft 11 in (3.02 m)
All values from Pro Day

=== Cincinnati Bengals ===
After going undrafted in the 2019 NFL draft, Dolegala signed with the Cincinnati Bengals. He spent the entire 2019 NFL season on the Bengals' 53-man roster, but did not appear in a game for the Bengals. After the Bengals drafted Joe Burrow first overall, Dolegala competed for the team's backup quarterback position with Ryan Finley. Dolegala was waived during the team's final cutdowns on September 5, 2020.

=== New England Patriots (first stint) ===
On September 16, 2020, Dolegala was signed to the practice squad of the New England Patriots. He was released by the Patriots on November 12. Dolegala was re-signed to the practice squad on November 16. He signed a reserve/future contract on January 4, 2021. On April 30, 2021, Dolegala was waived by the Patriots after they drafted Mac Jones.

=== Green Bay Packers (first stint) ===
On June 10, 2021, Dolegala signed a contract with the Green Bay Packers. He was released on July 27, 2021.

=== New England Patriots (second stint) ===
On July 28, 2021, Dolegala was claimed off waivers by the Patriots. He was waived on August 9, 2021.

=== Green Bay Packers (second stint) ===
On August 17, 2021, Dolegala signed with the Packers. He was waived on August 27, 2021.

=== Miami Dolphins ===
On October 27, 2021, Dolegala was signed to the Miami Dolphins practice squad. He was released on November 17.

On December 17, 2021, it was reported that Dolegala would sign with the Cleveland Browns. The deal ended up not coming to fruition after the Browns signed Kyle Lauletta off of the Jacksonville Jaguars' practice squad.

=== Saskatchewan Roughriders ===
On February 15, 2022, Dolegala signed with the Saskatchewan Roughriders of the Canadian Football League. With starting quarterback Cody Fajardo nursing an injured knee and possible COVID infection, Dolegala finally took his first professional regular-season snap and made his first CFL start on July 24, 2022, when he was named the starting quarterback against the Toronto Argonauts. In his debut performance Dolegala completed 13 of 28 pass attempts for 131 yards with one touchdown and one interception as the Riders were defeated 31–21. Dolegala was suspended for one game by the team in late September 2022 after he was arrested for impaired driving.

He became a free agent upon the expiry of his contract on February 13, 2024.

=== BC Lions ===
On February 14, 2024, it was announced that Dolegala had signed a one-year contract worth a maximum of $172,800 with the BC Lions. He went 15 for 26, throwing for 158 yards in two games for the Lions, and started in one, following the injury to Vernon Adams. Following the signing of Nathan Rourke, Dolegala was released on August 14, 2024.

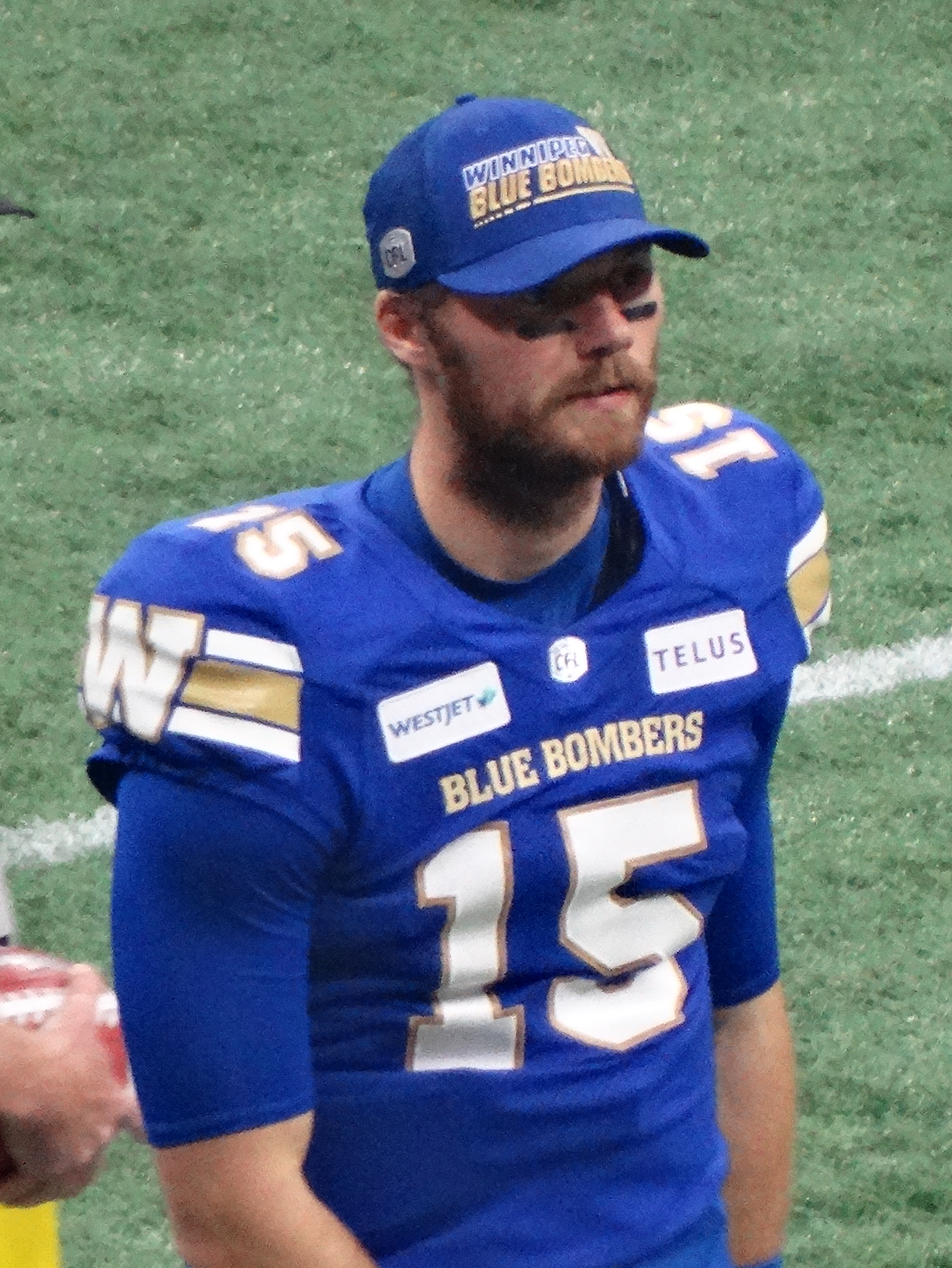
Dolegala with the Winnipeg Blue Bombers in 2024

=== Winnipeg Blue Bombers ===
On September 16, 2024, it was announced that Dolegala had signed a practice roster agreement with the Winnipeg Blue Bombers. He dressed for five regular season games and two post-season games, including the Blue Bombers' loss to the Toronto Argonauts in the 111th Grey Cup game. He was released on May 2, 2025.

=== Hamilton Tiger-Cats ===
Dolegala signed a practice roster agreement with the Hamilton Tiger-Cats on June 8, 2025. Following an injury to short-yardage specialist, Ante Milanovic-Litre, Dolegala was promoted to the active roster for the July 20 game against the Ottawa Redblacks. He played in the last 13 regular season games of the 2025 season, operating the short-yardage team, where he had 22 carries for 50 yards and one touchdown.

To start the 2026 season, Dolegala was the third-string quarterback while also continuing to operate the short-yardage team. However, after incumbent starter, Bo Levi Mitchell, was injured in week 5 and Tre Ford was ineffective in relief, Dolegala was named the starter for the week 6 game against the Roughriders.

== Career statistics ==
=== CFL ===
		Passing										Rushing				
Year	Team	GD	GS	Record	Att	Comp	Pct	Yards	TD	Int	QBR	Att	Yards	Avg	Long	TD
2022	SSK	2	1	0-1	35	16	45.7	154	1	2	44.2	2	12	6.0	7	0
2023	SSK	13	9	2-7	333	216	64.9	2,641	11	9	88.9	26	95	3.7	12	1
2024	BC	9	1	0-1	26	15	57.7	158	0	0	75.5	1	5	5.0	5	0
2024	WPG	5	0	0-0	0	0	0.0	0	0	0	0.0	0	0	0.0	0	0
2025	HAM	13	0	0-0	0	0	0.0	0	0	0	0.0	22	50	2.3	14	1
CFL totals		42	11	2-9	394	247	62.7	2,953	12	11	84.1	51	162	3.2	14	2

=== College ===
Season	Team	Games			Passing								Rushing			
Season	Team	GP	GS	Record	Cmp	Att	Pct	Yds	Y/A	TD	Int	Rtg	Att	Yds	Avg	TD
2014	Milford	11	11	8−3	143	286	50.0	2,276	7.9	20	7	135.0	23	–94	–4.1	0
2015	Central Connecticut	11	2	1–1	87	161	54.0	1,021	6.3	4	7	106.8	54	–28	–0.5	3
2016	Central Connecticut	11	11	2–9	258	432	59.7	2,934	6.8	15	9	124.1	64	−6	−0.1	5
2017	Central Connecticut	11	11	8–3	145	274	52.9	1,953	52.9	13	7	123.3	52	212	4.1	4
2018	Central Connecticut	11	11	6–5	164	269	61.0	2,221	8.3	16	6	145.5	63	274	4.3	6
FCS career		44	35	17–18	654	1,136	57.6	8,129	7.2	48	29	126.5	233	452	1.9	18

== Personal life ==
Dolegala's grandfather Al Bemiller was a member of the 1959 Syracuse Orangemen football team that won a national title; Al later played for the Buffalo Bills from 1961 to 1969.

In May 2023, Dolegala was found not guilty of impaired driving after the Crown prosecutor failed to prove Dolegala's guilt beyond a reasonable doubt. In his testimony, the arresting officer remarked "He didn't seem impaired."
