= Shemar Bridges =

American gridiron football player (born 1997)

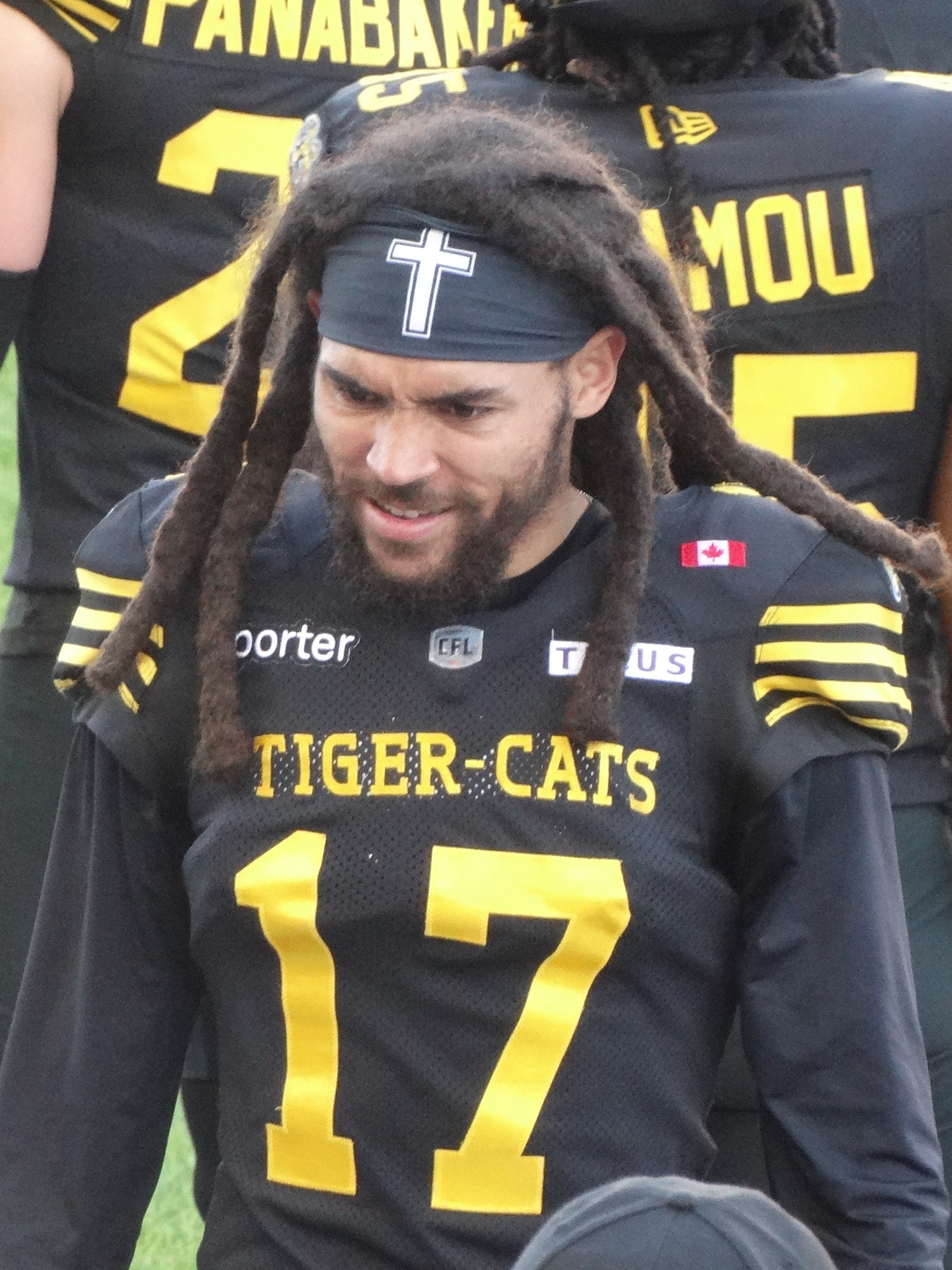
- Bridges with the Hamilton Tiger-Cats in 2025

Profile
- Position: Wide receiver

Personal information
- Born: December 26, 1997 (age 28); Jacksonville, Florida, U.S.
- Listed height: 6 ft 4 in (1.93 m)
- Listed weight: 208 lb (94 kg)

Career information
- High school: Potter's House Christian Academy (Jacksonville, Florida)
- College: Fort Valley State
- NFL draft: 2022: undrafted

Career history
- Baltimore Ravens (2022–2023); Hamilton Tiger-Cats (2024–2026); Saskatchewan Roughriders (2026)

Awards and highlights
- CFL East All-Star (2024); Frank M. Gibson Trophy (2024); Second team All-SIAC (2019)
- Stats at Pro Football Reference
- Stats at CFL.ca

Shemar Bridges (born December 26, 1997) is an American professional football wide receiver who is a free agent. He most recently played for the Saskatchewan Roughriders of the Canadian Football League (CFL). He played college football at Fort Valley State.

== Early life ==
Bridges grew up in Jacksonville, Florida and attended Potter's House Christian Academy.

== College career ==
Bridges began his college football career at Tusculum. He redshirted his true freshman season and transferred to Fort Valley State after his redshirt freshman year. Bridges was named second team All-Southern Intercollegiate Athletic Conference as a redshirt sophomore after finishing the season with 51 receptions for 765 yards and four touchdowns. He caught 13 passes for 301 yards and two touchdowns during his redshirt junior season, which was shortened to two games and played in the spring of 2021 due to the COVID-19 pandemic. Bridges played in four games as a senior and had 28 receptions for 292 yards and one touchdown.

== Professional career ==
Pre-draft measurables
Height	Weight	Arm length	Hand span	Wingspan	40-yard dash	10-yard split	20-yard split	20-yard shuttle	Three-cone drill	Vertical jump	Broad jump	Bench press
6 ft 3 5/8 in (1.92 m)	207 lb (94 kg)	33 7/8 in (0.86 m)	9 5/8 in (0.24 m)	6 ft 7 1/4 in (2.01 m)	4.66 s	1.59 s	2.69 s	4.43 s	7.16 s	34.0 in (0.86 m)	9 ft 11 in (3.02 m)	11 reps
All values from HBCU Combine/Pro Day

=== Baltimore Ravens ===
Bridges signed with the Baltimore Ravens as an undrafted free agent on May 7, 2022. He was waived by Baltimore with an injury designation on August 30, during final roster cuts. On November 30, Bridges was re–signed to the team's practice squad. Bridges signed a reserve/future contract with the Ravens on January 16, 2023. He was waived by the team on August 25.

=== Hamilton Tiger-Cats ===
Bridges signed with the Hamilton Tiger-Cats of the Canadian Football League (CFL) on January 22, 2024. He played in 15 regular season games in 2024 where he had 83 catches for 933 yards and four touchdowns. In his rookie CFL season, he was named a CFL East All-Star. In 2025, Bridges played in all 18 regular season games where he had just 34 receptions for 361 yards and two touchdowns. He began the 2026 season on the six-game injured list and was eventually released on August 19, 2026.

=== Saskatchewan Roughriders ===
On August 25, 2026, it was announced that Bridges had signed with the Saskatchewan Roughriders. After playing in three games, Bridges was released by the team on October 15, 2026.
