= Ted Goveia =

Canadian football executive (1970–2025)

Profile
- Position: General manager

Personal information
- Born: June 2, 1970; Burlington, Ontario, Canada
- Died: September 12, 2025 (aged 55); Hamilton, Ontario, Canada

Career information
- High school: Assumption Secondary (Burlington)
- University: Mount Allison

Career history

Coaching
- 1994–1997: Mount Allison Mounties (assistant coach, offensive coordinator)
- 1998–2000: Burlington Braves (Head coach)
- 2001–2004: McMaster Marauders (Receivers coach, Running backs coach, Special teams coordinator)
- 2005: UBC Thunderbirds (Offensive coordinator)
- 2006–2009: UBC Thunderbirds (Head coach)
- 2010–2011: Toronto Argonauts (Running backs coach)

Operations
- 1994–1997: Mount Allison Mounties (Recruitment coordinator)
- 2001–2004: McMaster Marauders (Recruitment coordinator)
- 2011–2012: Toronto Argonauts (Director of Canadian scouting)
- 2013: Toronto Argonauts (Director of player personnel)
- 2014–2019: Winnipeg Blue Bombers (Assistant general manager, director of player personnel)
- 2020–2024: Winnipeg Blue Bombers (Senior assistant general manager, director of player personnel)
- 2025: Hamilton Tiger-Cats (General manager)

Awards and highlights
- 3× Grey Cup champion (2012, 2019, 2021)

Ted Goveia (June 2, 1970 – September 12, 2025) was a Canadian professional football executive who was the general manager for the Hamilton Tiger-Cats of the Canadian Football League (CFL). He was a three-time Grey Cup champion after winning with the Toronto Argonauts in 2012 and with the Winnipeg Blue Bombers in 2019 and 2021.

== University playing career ==
Goveia played CIAU football for the Mount Allison Mounties from 1991 to 1993.

== Early coaching career ==
Following his playing career, Goveia joined the coaching staff for the Mount Allison Mounties in 1994. He served as the offensive coordinator and won a Jewett Trophy with the team in 1997. Goveia then served as head coach for the Burlington Braves from 1998 to 2000.

In 2001, Goveia joined the McMaster Marauders where he spent time as receivers coach, running backs coach, and special teams coordinator. He also served as the program's recruitment coordinator.

Goveia served as the offensive coordinator for the UBC Thunderbirds in 2005. On January 18, 2006, Goveia was named the head coach of the Thunderbirds. After a 4–4 season in 2006, he had three straight losing seasons and was fired at the end of the 2009 season when the team finished with 1–7 record.

== CFL career ==
=== Toronto Argonauts ===
After serving as a guest coach during training camp with the Toronto Argonauts for eight seasons, Goveia was named the team's full time running backs coach. On March 2, 2011, Goveia was named director of Canadian scouting for the Argonauts. He served in that capacity for two seasons and won his first Grey Cup championship in 2012 after the Argonauts defeated the Calgary Stampeders in the 100th Grey Cup. In the following season, he was promoted to director of player personnel on April 9, 2013.

=== Winnipeg Blue Bombers ===
On December 5, 2013, Goveia was hired as the assistant general manager and director of player personnel of the Winnipeg Blue Bombers. Following the team's victory in the 107th Grey Cup in 2019, he was promoted to senior assistant general manager. He won a second consecutive championship with the Blue Bombers in 2021 and signed a two-year contract extension shortly after.

=== Hamilton Tiger-Cats ===
On December 5, 2024, Goveia was named the general manager of the Hamilton Tiger-Cats. On the eve of the regular season opener for the 2025 season, Goveia announced that he had been diagnosed with a serious form of cancer in April, but did not want to be a distraction during training camp. He stated that he would still perform general manager duties while undergoing treatment. On September 5, 2025, the Tiger-Cats announced that their September 12 game against Goveia's former team, the Winnipeg Blue Bombers, would be dubbed the "Team Ted" game to celebrate Canadian football and honour Goveia's contributions to the game. Additionally, scholarships would be established by Goveia at McMaster University and Mount Allison University to support Canadian university football players. However, Goveia died on the morning of the scheduled game day. At the time of his death, the Tiger-Cats had a 7–5 record and were in first place in the east division, which was an improvement upon their fourth place from the previous year.

== CFL GM record ==
Team	Year	Regular season					Postseason		
Team	Year	Won	Lost	Ties	Win %	Finish	Won	Lost	Result
HAM	2025	7	5	0	.583	1st in East Division	–	–	
Total		7	5	0	.583		–	–	

== Personal life and death ==
Goveia was born in Burlington, Ontario on June 2, 1970. His mother was from Trinidad and his father was from British Guiana (now the independent country of Guyana). He died from esophageal cancer on September 12, 2025, at the age of 55.
