= Robert Panabaker =

Canadian gridiron football player (born 1999)

- Panabaker with the Hamilton Tiger-Cats in 2025

No. 24 – Hamilton Tiger-Cats
- Position: Defensive back
- Roster status: Active
- CFL status: National

Personal information
- Born: November 16, 1999 (age 26); London, Ontario, Canada
- Listed height: 6 ft 0 in (1.83 m)
- Listed weight: 190 lb (86 kg)

Career information
- University: Western
- CFL draft: 2023: 5th round, 40th overall pick

Career history
- 2023: Hamilton Tiger-Cats*
- 2024–present: Hamilton Tiger-Cats
- * Offseason or practice squad member only

Awards and highlights
- Vanier Cup champion (2021)
- Stats at CFL.ca

Robert Panabaker (born November 17, 1999) is a Canadian professional football defensive back for the Hamilton Tiger-Cats of the Canadian Football League (CFL).

== University career ==
Panabaker played U Sports football for the Western Mustangs from 2018 to 2023. He played in 44 games where he recorded 112 total tackles, eight interceptions, one sack, two forced fumbles, and four fumble recoveries. In the 56th Vanier Cup in 2021, Panabaker had two tackles and two pass breakups as the Mustangs defeated the Saskatchewan Huskies 27–21.

== Professional career ==
Panabaker was selected by the Hamilton Tiger-Cats in the fifth round, 40th overall, in the 2023 CFL draft and signed with the team on May 10, 2023. Following training camp in 2023, he joined the team's practice roster, but was eventually transferred to the suspended list and released on August 14, 2023, so that he could return for a final year of university.

On November 28, 2023, Panabaker re-signed with the Tiger-Cats. He made the team's active roster following training camp in 2024 and made his professional debut on June 8, 2024, against the Calgary Stampeders. He played in 16 regular season games, starting in four at safety, where he had 18 defensive tackles, eight special teams tackles, two pass knockdowns, one forced fumble, and one sack. His 2025 season was limited to seven games due to injury, but he returned in the last half of the season to record two defensive tackles and two special teams tackles.
