= Ronan Horrall =

Canadian gridiron football player (born 2003)

- Horrall with the Hamilton Tiger-Cats in 2026

No. 35 – Hamilton Tiger-Cats
- Position: Defensive back
- Roster status: Active
- CFL status: National

Personal information
- Born: January 19, 2003 (age 23); Ottawa, Ontario, Canada
- Listed height: 6 ft 1 in (1.85 m)
- Listed weight: 202 lb (92 kg)

Career information
- High school: Franco-Cité
- University: British Columbia
- CFL draft: 2025: 6th round, 48th overall pick

Career history
- 2025–present: Hamilton Tiger-Cats
- Stats at CFL.ca

Ronan Horrall (born January 19, 2003) is a Canadian professional football defensive back for the Hamilton Tiger-Cats of the Canadian Football League (CFL).

== University career ==
Horrall played U Sports football for the UBC Thunderbirds from 2021 to 2024. He played in 25 games and recorded 32 total tackles, one tackle for loss, one sack, two interceptions, two pass deflections, and a forced fumble.

== Professional career ==
Horrall was selected by the Hamilton Tiger-Cats in the sixth round, 48th overall, in the 2025 CFL draft and signed with the team on May 6, 2025. Following training camp in 2025, he was released with the final cuts on June 1, 2025. However, Horrall was re-signed by the Tiger-Cats on July 23, 2025, to a practice roster agreement. He soon after made his professional debut on August 7, 2025, against the BC Lions where he had one special teams tackle and one fumble recovery. In total, he played in seven regular season games and recorded two special teams tackles and two fumble recoveries. Horrall also made his post-season debut in the East Final against the Montreal Alouettes, but the Tiger-Cats lost 19–16.

In 2026, Horrall accepted a practice roster position following training camp. He was promoted to the active roster in week 8 against the Alouettes and recorded a career-high three special teams tackles in week 11 against the Saskatchewan Roughriders.
