= Jake Nitychoruk =

Canadian gridiron football player (born 2003)

- Nitychoruk with the Hamilton Tiger-Cats in 2026

No. 29 – Hamilton Tiger-Cats
- Position: Defensive back
- Roster status: Active
- CFL status: National

Personal information
- Born: April 27, 2003 (age 23); Winnipeg, Manitoba, Canada
- Listed height: 6 ft 4 in (1.93 m)
- Listed weight: 205 lb (93 kg)

Career information
- High school: Grant Park
- University: Manitoba
- CFL draft: 2025: 7th round, 57th overall pick

Career history
- 2025: Hamilton Tiger-Cats*
- 2026–present: Hamilton Tiger-Cats
- * Offseason or practice squad member only
- Stats at CFL.ca

Jake Nitychoruk (born April 27, 2003) is a Canadian professional football defensive back for the Hamilton Tiger-Cats of the Canadian Football League (CFL).

== University career ==
Nitychoruk played U Sports football for the Manitoba Bisons from 2021 to 2024. He played in 27 games and recorded 54 total tackles, one tackle for loss, seven pass breakups, one forced fumble, one fumble recovery, and one blocked kick.

== Professional career ==
Nitychoruk was selected by the Hamilton Tiger-Cats in the seventh round, 57th overall, in the 2025 CFL draft and signed with the team on May 6, 2025. Following training camp in 2025, he was released with the final cuts on June 1, 2025.

On November 27, 2025, after the 2025 season had ended, Nitychoruk re-signed with the Tiger-Cats. In 2026, he accepted a practice roster position following training camp. He was promoted to the active roster in week 5 and made his professional debut on July 5, 2026, against the Winnipeg Blue Bombers.
