= Devin Veresuk =

Canadian gridiron football player (born 2001)

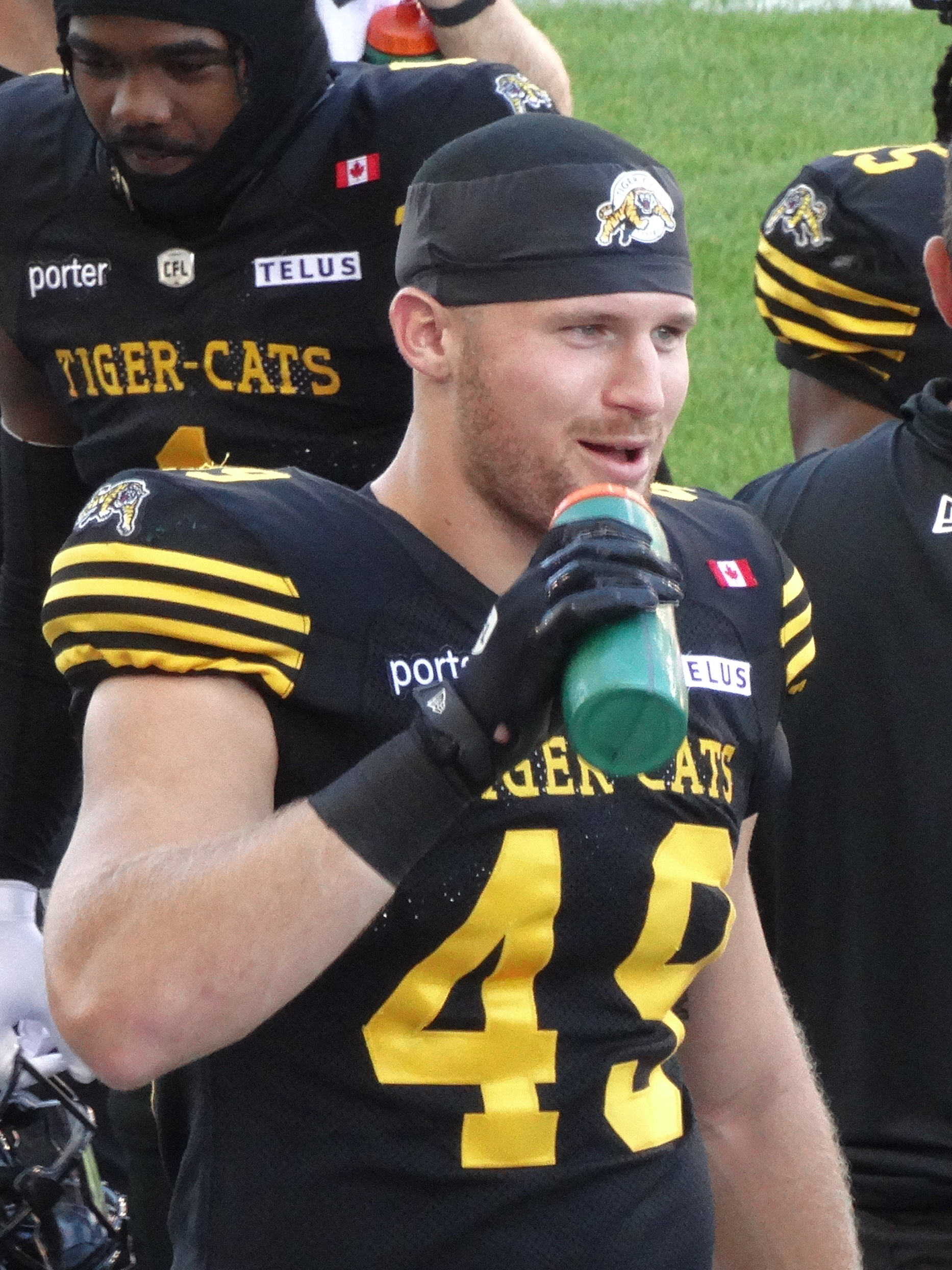
- Veresuk with the Hamilton Tiger-Cats in 2025

Profile
- Position: Linebacker

Personal information
- Born: November 22, 2001 (age 24); Windsor, Ontario, Canada
- Listed height: 6 ft 2 in (1.88 m)
- Listed weight: 240 lb (109 kg)

Career information
- High school: Holy Names High
- University: Windsor
- CFL draft: 2025: 1st round, 2nd overall pick

Career history
- Hamilton Tiger-Cats (2025); Indianapolis Colts (2026)*
- * Offseason or practice squad member only

Awards and highlights
- Frank M. Gibson Trophy (2025)
- Stats at Pro Football Reference
- Stats at CFL.ca

Devin Veresuk (born November 22, 2001) is a Canadian professional football linebacker. He has also played for the Hamilton Tiger-Cats of the Canadian Football League (CFL).

== University career ==
Veresuk played U Sports football for the Windsor Lancers from 2020 to 2024. He did not play in 2020 due to the cancellation of the 2020 U Sports football season, but in the following four seasons, he played in 22 games where he had 199 total tackles, including 15.5 tackles for loss, 11 quarterback sacks, two forced fumbles, and one interception.

== Professional career ==
Pre-draft measurables
Height	Weight	Arm length	Hand span	Wingspan	40-yard dash	10-yard split	20-yard split	20-yard shuttle	Three-cone drill	Vertical jump	Broad jump	Bench press
6 ft 1 5/8 in (1.87 m)	240 lb (109 kg)	31 1/2 in (0.80 m)	9 5/8 in (0.24 m)	6 ft 4 in (1.93 m)	4.51 s	1.70 s	2.61 s	4.20 s	7.07 s	36.0 in (0.91 m)	10 ft 4 in (3.15 m)	27 reps
All values from CFL Combine/Pro Day

=== Hamilton Tiger-Cats ===
In the final Canadian Football League's Amateur Scouting Bureau rankings for players eligible for the 2025 CFL draft, Veresuk was listed as the 19th-best player available. He was then selected by the Hamilton Tiger-Cats in the first round, second overall, of the 2025 CFL draft and signed with the team on May 14, 2025. Following training camp in 2025, he made the team's active roster and made his professional debut on June 7, 2025, against the Calgary Stampeders where he had one special teams tackle. After the team released their incumbent starting middle linebacker, Kyle Wilson, Veresuk made his first career start on June 27, 2025, against the Montreal Alouettes. In that game, he recorded eight defensive tackles, one special teams tackle, and his first career interception which he returned 36 yards for his first career touchdown. He played in 18 regular season games, starting in 15, where he recorded 66 defensive tackles, three special teams tackles, two sacks, one interception, one forced fumble, and two touchdowns. He was released on January 12, 2026, in order to pursue an opportunity in the National Football League.

=== Indianapolis Colts ===
On January 13, 2026, Veresuk signed a reserve/futures contract with the Indianapolis Colts. He was waived by Indianapolis as a part of final roster cuts on August 30.
