= Dennis McKnight =

American football player and coach (born 1959)

- McKnight with the BC Lions in 2026

BC Lions
- Title: Special teams coordinator

Personal information
- Born: September 12, 1959 (age 67); Dallas, Texas, U.S.
- Listed height: 6 ft 3 in (1.91 m)
- Listed weight: 273 lb (124 kg)

Career information
- High school: Susan E. Wagner (Staten Island, New York)
- College: Drake
- NFL draft: 1981: undrafted

Career history

Playing
- Cleveland Browns (1982)*; San Diego Chargers (1982–1989); Detroit Lions (1990); Philadelphia Eagles (1991); Detroit Lions (1992)
- * Offseason or practice squad member only

Coaching
- Southeast Missouri State (1981) Graduate assistant; Hawaii (1999–2000) Special teams coach; Grossmont (2001–2003) Special teams coordinator & offensive line coach; San Diego State (2005) Tight ends coach; Hawaii (2006–2007) Special teams & offensive line coach; SMU (2008) Offensive line coach; SMU (2009–2010) Special teams coach; Edmonton Eskimos (2011) Running backs coach; Lamar (2012–2013) Special teams & offensive line coach; Hamilton Tiger-Cats (2017) Special teams coordinator; Hamilton Tiger-Cats (2018–2019) Offensive line coach; Houston Roughnecks (2020) Offensive assistant & special teams coach; Washington State (2021) Offensive line coach; Seattle Sea Dragons (2023) Offensive line coach; Hamilton Tiger-Cats (2024–2025) Special teams coordinator; BC Lions (2026–present) Special teams coordinator

Career NFL statistics
- Games played: 141
- Games started: 100
- Fumble recoveries: 4
- Stats at Pro Football Reference

Dennis Neal McKnight (born September 12, 1959) is an American football coach and former guard who is the special teams coordinator for the BC Lions of the Canadian Football League (CFL). He played in the National Football League (NFL) for the San Diego Chargers, Detroit Lions, and Philadelphia Eagles. McKnight played college football at Drake University.

== Coaching career ==
McKnight was the running back coach of the Edmonton Eskimos in 2011. On February 1, 2012 Lamar University hired McKnight to take over as the offensive line and special teams coach.

McKnight was named offensive line coach for the Hamilton Tiger-Cats on March 1, 2018. He originally joined the organization as special teams coordinator on February 9, 2017.

On December 5, 2019, the Houston Roughnecks hired McKnight to take over as the offensive assistant and special teams coach.

McKnight was officially hired by the Seattle Sea Dragons on September 13, 2022.

McKnight was named the Hamilton Tiger-Cats special teams coordinator on July 3, 2024. He remained in that capacity through the 2025 season, but left the team prior to the 2026 season.

Following the dismissal of Cory McDiarmid, McKnight was hired as the special teams coordinator for the BC Lions on July 13, 2026.
