= Arvin Hosseini =

Canadian gridiron football player (born 2003)

No. 61 – Edmonton Elks
- Position: Offensive lineman
- Roster status: Active
- CFL status: National

Personal information
- Born: November 7, 2003 (age 23); Vancouver, British Columbia, Canada
- Listed height: 6 ft 4 in (1.93 m)
- Listed weight: 310 lb (141 kg)

Career information
- High school: Carson Graham (North Vancouver, British Columbia)
- University: UBC (2022–2024)
- CFL draft: 2025: 3rd round, 21st overall pick

Career history
- Hamilton Tiger-Cats (2025–2026); Edmonton Elks (2026–present)

Awards and highlights
- Grey Cup champion (2026); Canada West All-Star (2024)

Career CFL statistics as of 2026
- Games played: 3
- Stats at CFL.ca

Arvin Hosseini (born November 7, 2003) is a Canadian professional football offensive lineman for the Edmonton Elks of the Canadian Football League (CFL). He played U Sports football for the UBC Thunderbirds.

== Early life ==
Hosseini was born on November 7, 2003, in Vancouver, British Columbia, Canada. He attended Carson Graham Secondary School in North Vancouver, British Columbia.

== University career ==
Hosseini played U Sports football for the UBC Thunderbirds from 2022 to 2025. He played in 27 games and started in 16. Hosseini was named a Canada West All-Star in 2024.

== Professional career ==
Pre-draft measurables
Height	Weight	40-yard dash	20-yard shuttle	Three-cone drill	Vertical jump	Broad jump	Bench press
6 ft 4 3/8 in (1.94 m)	310 lb (141 kg)	5.08 s	4.62 s	7.82 s	28 in (0.71 m)	8 ft 9 7/8 in (2.69 m)	18 reps
All values from CFL Combine

=== Hamilton Tiger-Cats ===
Hosseini was selected with the 21st pick in the third round of the 2025 CFL draft by the Hamilton Tiger-Cats. On June 6, he was placed on the injured list. On June 26, Hosseini was moved to the practice roster. He was signed and released from the active roster three times during 2025, dressing in two games for the team. On June 3, 2026, Hosseini was placed on the injured list with an ankle injury. On July 24, he was released by the Tiger-Cats.

=== Edmonton Elks ===
On July 27, 2026, Hosseini was signed by the Edmonton Elks to the practice roster. On October 23, he was elevated to the active roster and played in the regular season finale against the Saskatchewan Roughriders. On October 25, Hosseini reverted to the practice roster.
