= Philip Ossai =

American gridiron football player (born 2001)

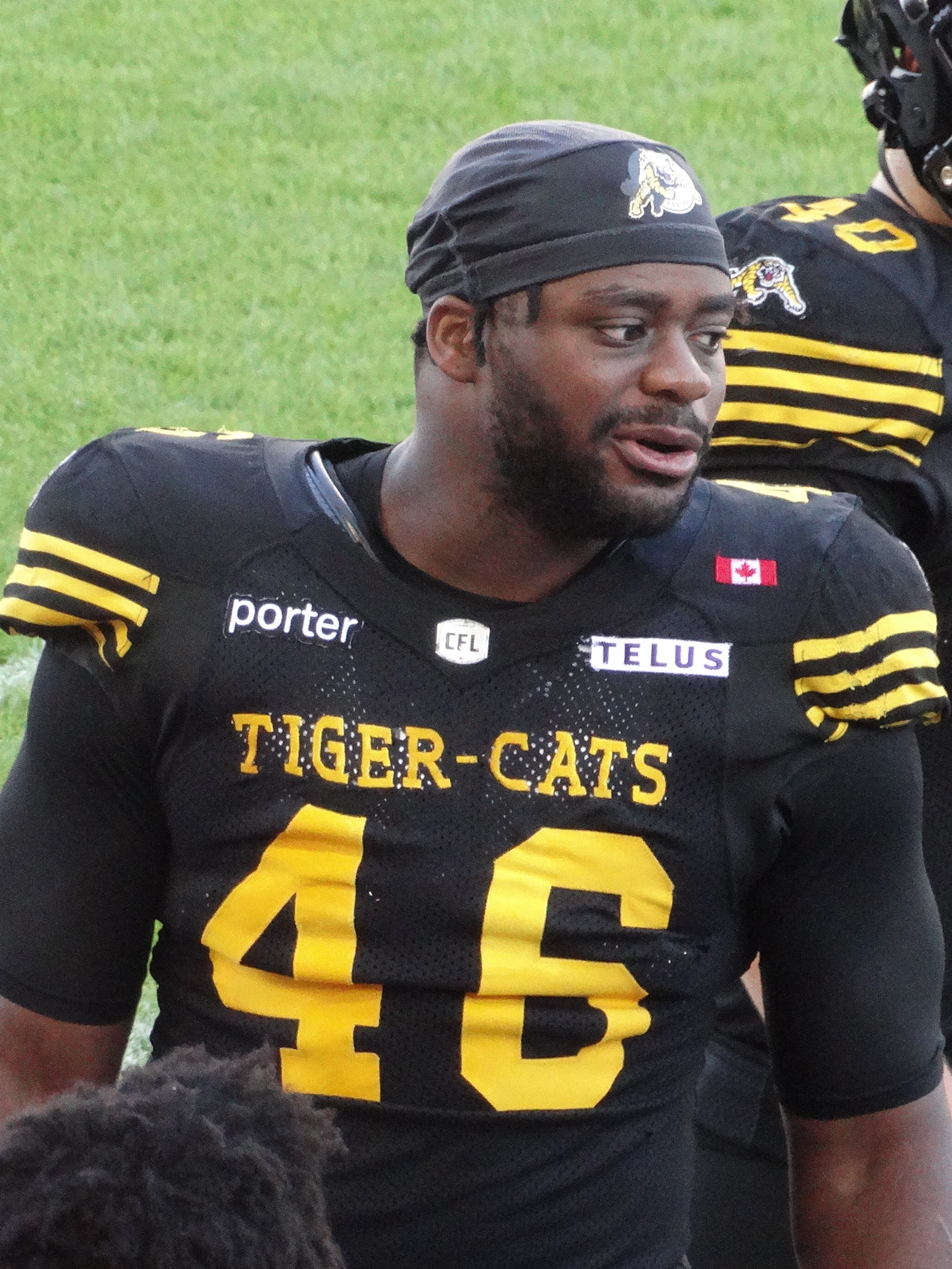
- Ossai with the Hamilton Tiger-Cats in 2025

No. 46 – Hamilton Tiger-Cats
- Position: Defensive lineman
- Roster status: Active
- CFL status: American

Personal information
- Born: September 3, 2001 (age 25)
- Listed height: 6 ft 0 in (1.83 m)
- Listed weight: 258 lb (117 kg)

Career information
- High school: Oak Ridge (Conroe, Texas)
- College: Houston Baptist (2019–2021); North Alabama (2022–2023)

Career history
- 2025–present: Hamilton Tiger-Cats

Awards and highlights
- CFL East All-Star (2026); Second-team all-UAC (2023); Second-team all-SLC (2020)
- Stats at CFL.ca

Philip Ossai (born May 1, 2001) is an American professional football defensive lineman for the Hamilton Tiger-Cats of the Canadian Football League (CFL). Ossai previously played college football for the Houston Baptist Huskies and the North Alabama Lions.

== College career ==
Ossai played college football for the Houston Baptist Huskies from 2019 to 2021 and the North Alabama Lions from 2022 to 2023. At Houston Baptist he played in 22 games and recorded 89 tackles, including 9 tackles for a loss, 1.5 sacks, three pass deflections, one forced fumble and two fumble recoveries. Ossai then transferred to North Alabama for his final two years of eligibility.

In 20 games as a Lion, he recorded 90 tackles, including 17 tackles for a loss, six sacks, three pass deflections and two fumble recoveries. He was named to the Second-team all-UAC in 2023, after leading his team in TFLs, sacks and fumble recoveries.

== Professional career ==
Pre-draft measurables
Height	Weight	Arm length	Hand span	Wingspan	40-yard dash	10-yard split	20-yard split	20-yard shuttle	Three-cone drill	Vertical jump	Broad jump	Bench press
6 ft 0 1/4 in (1.84 m)	250 lb (113 kg)	32 1/4 in (0.82 m)	9 1/2 in (0.24 m)	6 ft 7 3/8 in (2.02 m)	4.72 s	1.61 s	2.72 s	4.63 s	7.58 s	33.5 in (0.85 m)	10 ft 4 in (3.15 m)	24 reps
All values from Pro Day

On March 5, 2025, Ossai signed with the Hamilton Tiger-Cats. He made his CFL debut on July 27 against the BC Lions but did not record any statistics. He made his first tackle the following week against the Edmonton Elks on August 2.

== Personal life ==
Ossai's brother Joseph plays for the New York Jets of the National Football League.
