= Darrin Paulo =

American football player (born 1997)

No. 62 – Hamilton Tiger-Cats
- Position: Offensive lineman
- Roster status: Suspended
- CFL status: American

Personal information
- Born: March 5, 1997 (age 29); Sacramento, California, U.S.
- Listed height: 6 ft 5 in (1.96 m)
- Listed weight: 320 lb (145 kg)

Career information
- High school: Grant Union (Sacramento)
- College: Utah (2015–2019)
- NFL draft: 2020: undrafted

Career history
- New Orleans Saints (2020)*; Denver Broncos (2020)*; Detroit Lions (2021)*; Tampa Bay Bandits (2022); Detroit Lions (2022)*; Memphis Showboats (2024); Hamilton Tiger-Cats (2025–present)*
- * Offseason or practice squad member only

Awards and highlights
- First-team All-Pac-12 (2019)
- Stats at Pro Football Reference
- Stats at CFL.ca

Darrin Paulo (born March 5, 1997) is an American professional football offensive lineman for the Hamilton Tiger-Cats of the Canadian Football League (CFL). He played college football at Utah.

== Early life ==
Darrin Paulo was born on March 5, 1997, in Sacramento, California. He attended and played high school football at Grant Union High School in Sacramento. He earned MaxPreps second-team all-state honors as a senior in 2014 after helping the team to a 14–1 record. Paulo was rated a three-star recruit by both Rivals.com and Scout.com, and the No. 62 offensive tackle in the country by Rivals. He also participated in track at Grant Union, placing second in the state in the discus throw (184'2) at the 2014 CIF state championship.

== College career ==
Paulo played college football for the Utah Utes of the University of Utah from 2016 to 2019. He redshirted the 2015 season. He played in all 13 games on special teams in 2016, and one snap on offense. He earned honorable mention Pac-12 All-Academic honors for the 2016 season. Paulo started all 13 games at right tackle in 2017, garnering second-team Pac-12 All-Academic recognition. He started 13 games at right tackle for the second straight year in 2018 while also missing one game due to injury. He was named honorable mention Pac-12 All-Academic for the second time. Paulo started all 14 games at left tackle as a senior in 2018, earning first-team All-Pac-12 honors. He majored in economics and sociology at Utah. He was invited to the East–West Shrine Bowl after his senior year.

== Professional career ==
Pre-draft measurables
Height	Weight	Arm length	Hand span	Wingspan
6 ft 5 1/8 in (1.96 m)	312 lb (142 kg)	34 7/8 in (0.89 m)	9 1/2 in (0.24 m)	7 ft 1 1/8 in (2.16 m)
All values from Pro Day

After going undrafted in the 2020 NFL draft, Paulo signed with the New Orleans Saints on May 1, 2020. He was waived on August 29, 2020.

Paulo was claimed off waivers by the Denver Broncos on August 30, 2020. He was waived on September 5, and signed to Denver's practice squad the next day. He was placed on the practice squad/COVID-19 list on November 4, and taken off the COVID-19 list on November 18, 2020. Paulo signed a futures contract with the Broncos on January 4, 2021. He was waived on February 2, 2021.

Paulo signed with the Detroit Lions on May 24, 2021. He was waived on August 31, signed to the practice squad the next day, released on October 15, signed to the practice squad again on October 27, released again on November 30, signed to the practice squad for the third time on December 9, released for the fourth time on December 11, 2021, signed to the practice squad for the fourth time on January 5, 2022, and released for the fifth time on January 11, 2022.

Paulo was signed to the practice squad of the Tampa Bay Bandits of the United States Football League (USFL) on June 10, 2022. He was promoted to the active roster on June 16, 2022, and played in the final game of the regular season.

Paulo signed with the Lions again on July 29, 2022. He was waived on August 30, signed to the practice squad on September 7, released the next day, signed to the Lions' practice squad for the sixth time on September 14, 2022, and signed to a futures contract on January 9, 2023. He was later waived for the final time on August 27, 2023.

On November 9, 2023, Paulo signed with the USFL's Memphis Showboats for the 2024 season. He started all ten games for the Showboats in 2024. He re-signed with Memphis on August 27, 2024. Paulo was later waived on January 22, 2025.

Paulo was signed by the Hamilton Tiger-Cats of the Canadian Football League on March 26, 2025. He was placed on the team's reserve/suspended list on May 16, 2025.
