= Isaiah Bagnah =

Canadian gridiron football player (born 2001)

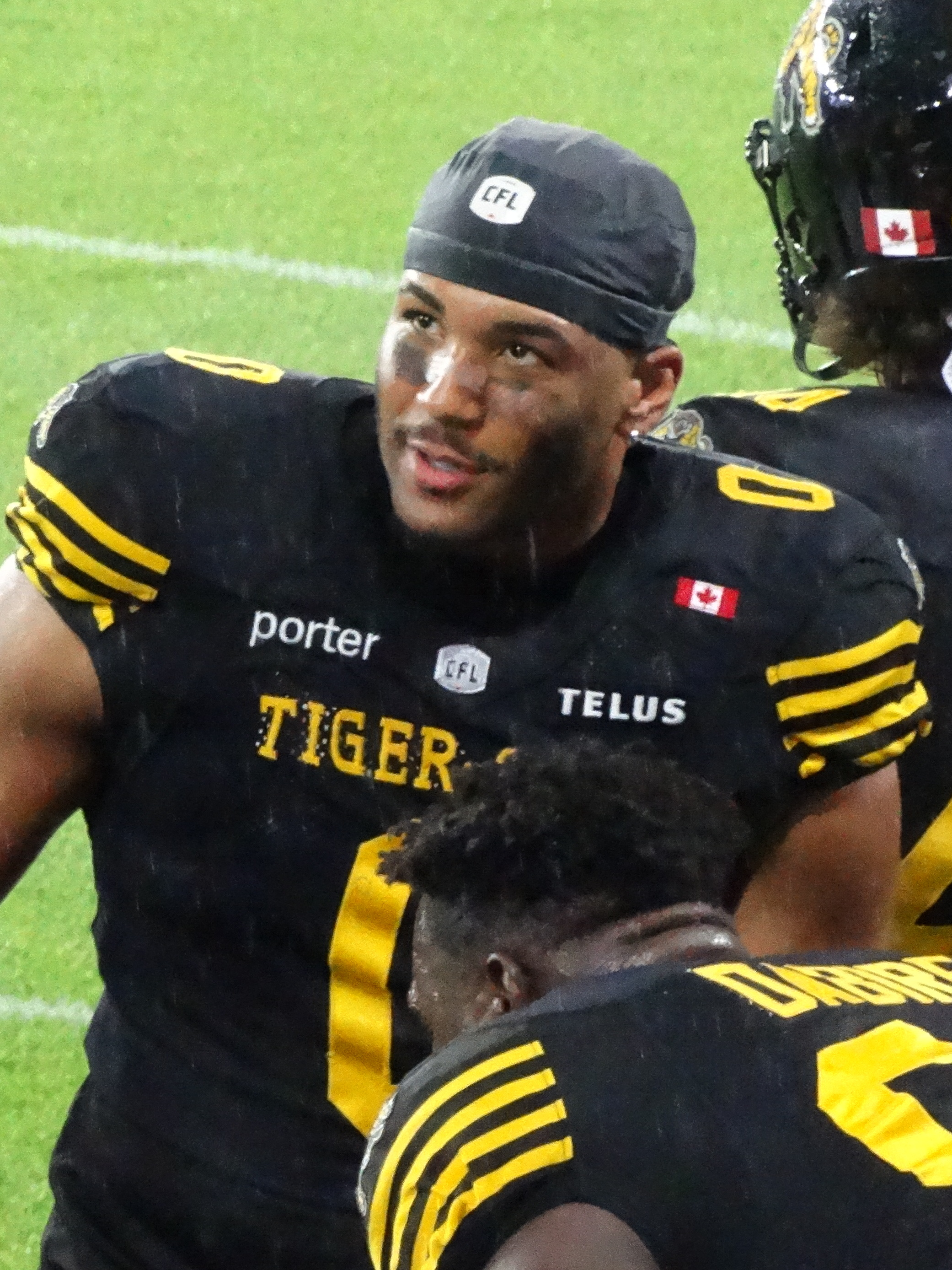
- Bagnah with the Hamilton Tiger-Cats in 2026

No. 0 – Hamilton Tiger-Cats
- Position: Defensive lineman
- Roster status: Active
- CFL status: National

Personal information
- Born: July 17, 2001 (age 25)
- Listed height: 6 ft 3 in (1.91 m)
- Listed weight: 261 lb (118 kg)

Career information
- High school: Lethbridge (Lethbridge, Alberta)
- College: Boise State (2019–2022); BYU (2023–2024)
- CFL draft: 2025: 2nd round, 9th overall pick

Career history
- Hamilton Tiger-Cats (2025–present)

Career CFL statistics as of 2026
- Games played: 23
- Defensive tackles: 11
- Sacks: 1
- Stats at CFL.ca

Isaiah Bagnah (born July 17, 2001) is a Canadian professional football defensive lineman for the Hamilton Tiger-Cats of the Canadian Football League (CFL). He played college football at Boise State and BYU.

== Early life ==
Isaiah Bagnah was born on July 17, 2001. He was raised in Lethbridge, Alberta, as a follower of The Church of Jesus Christ of Latter-day Saints (LDS Church). As a result of his faith, he grew up a fan of the LDS Church-affiliated BYU Cougars.

Bagnah played high school football at Lethbridge Collegiate Institute, and was a three-year varsity starter. He was named first-team All Canada during both his junior and senior seasons. Bagnah also participated in basketball and track in high school. He earned South Alberta High School League second-team all-star honors in basketball during the 2017–18 season. In the class of 2019, he was rated a three-star football recruit by both ESPN.com and 247Sports.com.

== College career ==
Bagnah first played college football for the Boise State Broncos of Boise State University. He appeared in two games as a true freshman linebacker in 2019, posting one assisted tackle, before redshirting the season. He played in six games, starting two, during the COVID-19 shortened 2020 season, recording five solo tackles, seven assisted tackles, and three sacks. Bagnah played in all 12 games, starting six, in 2021, totaling 22 solo tackles, 14 assisted tackles, six sacks, and one forced fumble. He moved to defensive end during the 2022 season, appearing in six games while posting five solo tackles, five assisted tackles, and one sack. He graduated from Boise State with a business administration degree.

In 2023, Bagnah transferred to play for the BYU Cougars of Brigham Young University, following Boise State coach Kelly Poppinga. He played in all 12 games, starting eight, during the 2023 season, totaling 12 solo tackles, 15 assisted tackles, one sack, one forced fumble, one fumble recovery, and one pass breakup. As a sixth-year senior in 2024, Bagnah appeared in all 13 games, starting seven, while recording 12 solo tackles, 13 assisted tackles, one sack, and two pass breakups. He graduated from BYU with a sociology degree in April 2024.

== Professional career ==
Pre-draft measurables
Height	Weight	Arm length	Hand span	Wingspan	40-yard dash	10-yard split	20-yard split	20-yard shuttle	Three-cone drill	Vertical jump	Broad jump
6 ft 2 3/4 in (1.90 m)	256 lb (116 kg)	32 1/8 in (0.82 m)	10 in (0.25 m)	6 ft 8 1/2 in (2.04 m)	4.99 s	1.69 s	2.87 s	4.70 s	7.40 s	30.0 in (0.76 m)	8 ft 11 in (2.72 m)
All values from Pro Day

Bagnah reportedly posted "pedestrian" numbers at BYU's pro day in March 2025. He was selected by the Hamilton Tiger-Cats in the second round, with the ninth overall pick, of the 2025 CFL draft. He officially signed with the team on May 5, 2025. In the 2025 season opener against the Calgary Stampeders, Bagnah posted his first CFL sack. Due to a foot problem, he was placed on the injured list on July 19, 2025.

== Personal life ==
Bagnah can also speak French.
