= Quinton Barrow =

American gridiron football player (born 2000)

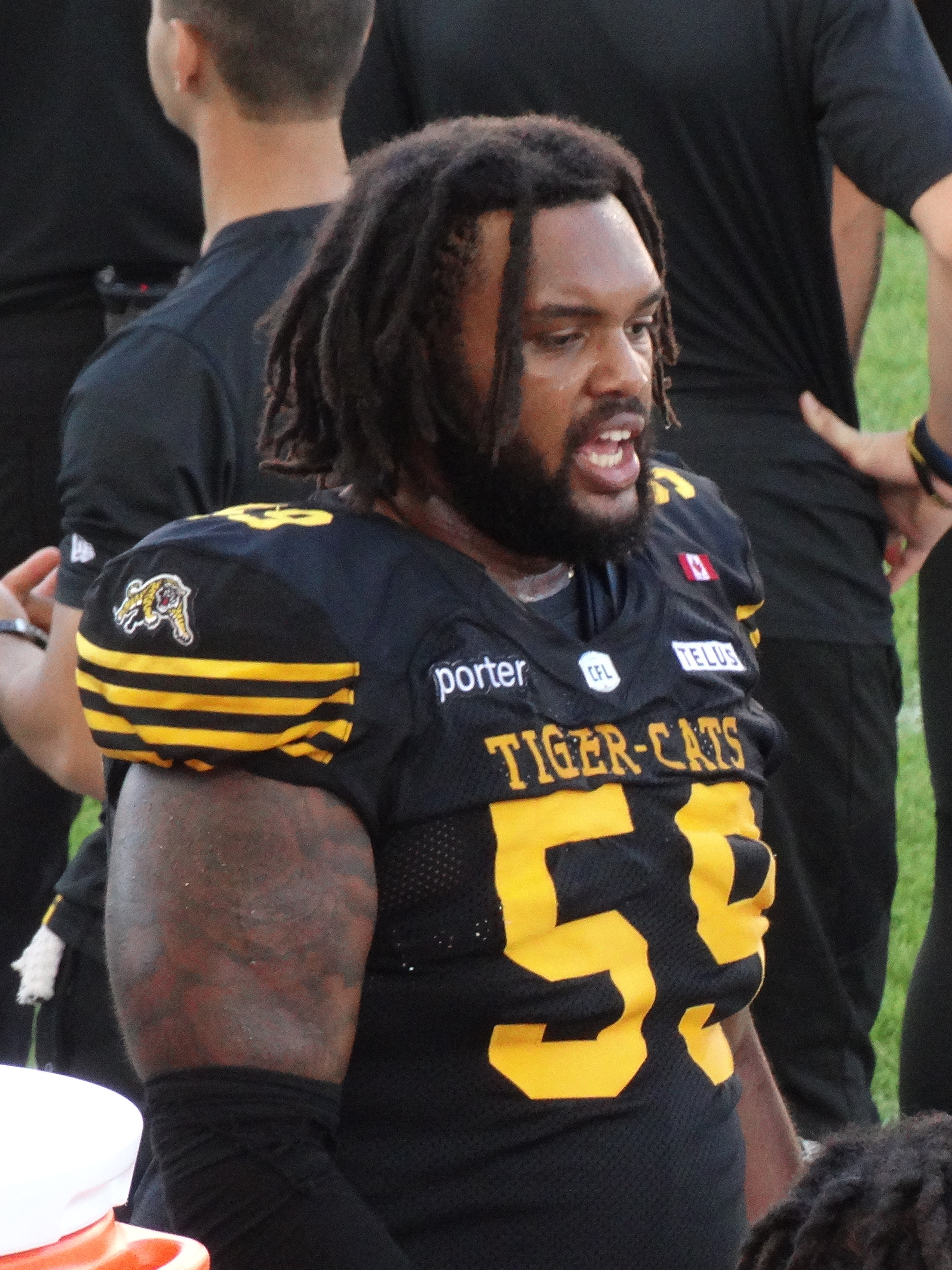
- Barrow with the Hamilton Tiger-Cats in 2025

No. 59 – Hamilton Tiger-Cats
- Position: Offensive tackle
- Roster status: Active
- CFL status: American

Personal information
- Born: June 27, 2000 (age 26)
- Listed height: 6 ft 6 in (1.98 m)
- Listed weight: 331 lb (150 kg)

Career information
- High school: Romulus (Romulus, Michigan)
- College: Grand Valley State (2018–2022)
- NFL draft: 2023: undrafted

Career history
- Hamilton Tiger-Cats (2024–present)

Awards and highlights
- CFL East All-Star (2025); First-team DII All-American (2022); 2× First-team All-GLIAC (2021, 2022); GLIAC Offensive Lineman of the Year (2022)
- Stats at CFL.ca

Quinton Barrow (born June 27, 2000) is an American professional football offensive tackle for the Hamilton Tiger-Cats of the Canadian Football League (CFL). He played college football for the Grand Valley State Lakers.

== College career ==
Barrow played college football for the Grand Valley State Lakers from 2018 to 2022. In the last two years at GVSU, he was named to the first-team All-Great Lakes Intercollegiate Athletic Conference twice, while also being named GLIAC Offensive Lineman of the Year. In addition, Barrow was tapped to the AP first-team All-American squad in 2022. He started 36 straight games in his career, all at left tackle.

== Professional career ==
Pre-draft measurables
Height	Weight	Arm length	Hand span	Wingspan	40-yard dash	10-yard split	20-yard split	20-yard shuttle	Three-cone drill	Bench press
6 ft 5 5/8 in (1.97 m)	317 lb (144 kg)	34 1/4 in (0.87 m)	9 3/4 in (0.25 m)	6 ft 9 5/8 in (2.07 m)	5.40 s	1.78 s	3.01 s	4.87 s	8.14 s	19 reps
All values from Pro Day

On March 13, 2024, Barrow was signed by the Hamilton Tiger-Cats of the Canadian Football League (CFL). He started in seven games at right tackle before he was placed on the six-game injured list on September 1, 2024, ending his season.

Barrow entered the 2025 season as the starting right tackle for the Tiger-Cats, playing in all 18 games. He was named to the East All-CFL team.
