= Zamari Walton =

American football player (born 1999)

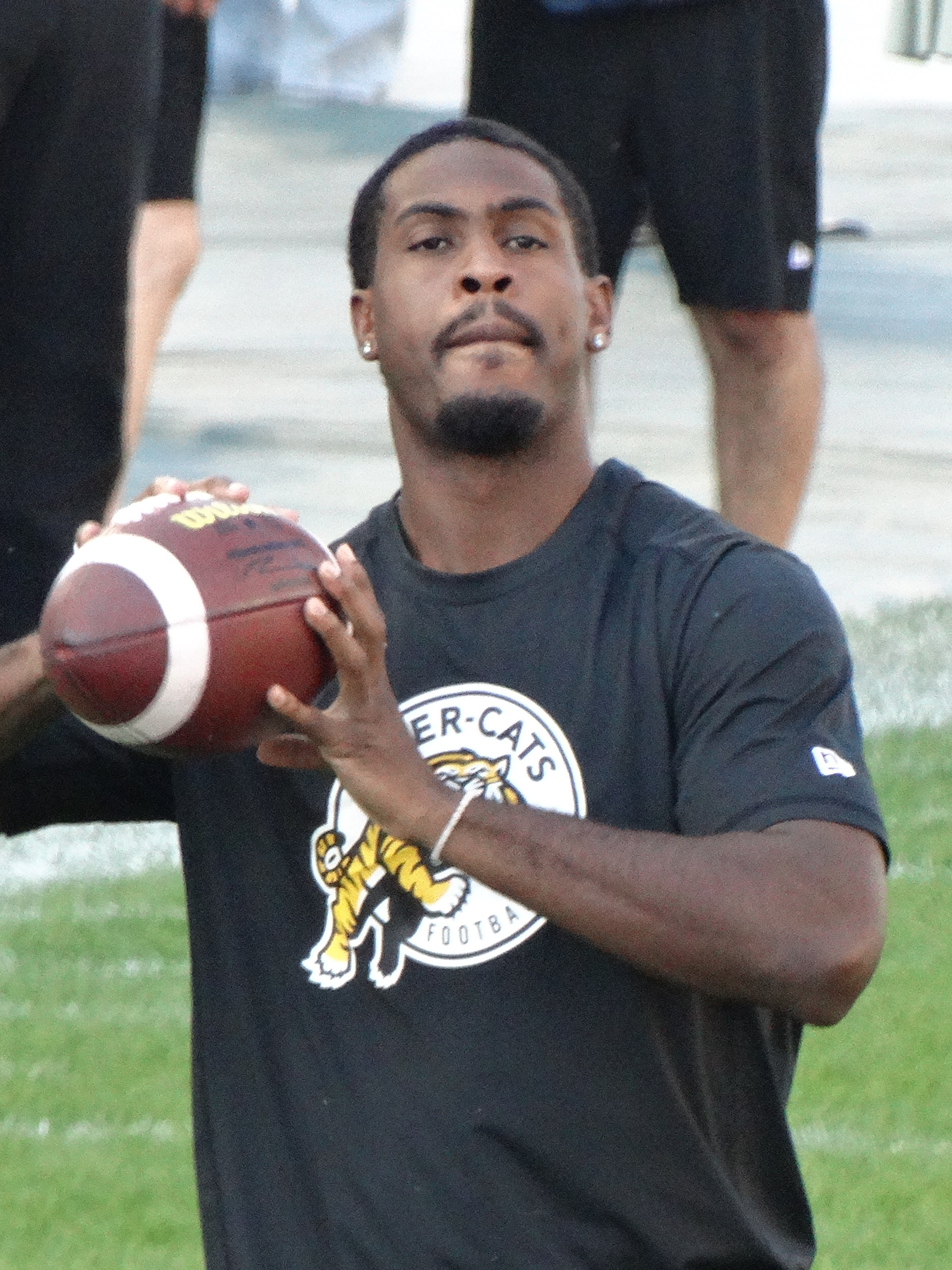
- Walton with the Hamilton Tiger-Cats in 2025

No. 20 – Hamilton Tiger-Cats
- Position: Defensive back
- Roster status: Practice roster
- CFL status: American

Personal information
- Born: May 31, 1999 (age 27); Melbourne, Florida, U.S.
- Listed height: 6 ft 3 in (1.91 m)
- Listed weight: 185 lb (84 kg)

Career information
- High school: Melbourne Central Catholic
- College: Georgia Tech (2018–2022); Ole Miss (2023)
- NFL draft: 2024: undrafted

Career history
- Los Angeles Chargers (2024)*; Hamilton Tiger-Cats (2025–present)
- * Offseason or practice squad member only
- Stats at CFL.ca

Zamari Oshay Walton (born May 31, 1999) is an American professional football defensive back for the Hamilton Tiger-Cats of the Canadian Football League (CFL). Walton previously played college football for the Georgia Tech Yellow Jackets and the Ole Miss Rebels. He has also had a stint with the Los Angeles Chargers of the National Football League (NFL).

== College career ==
Walton played college football for the Georgia Tech Yellow Jackets from 2018 to 2022 and the Ole Miss Rebels in 2023. He redshirted his first year after he appeared in four games and recorded four tackles. The following season Walton played in all 12 games and started in 11, recording 29 tackles and three pass breakups. He started in all 10 games in 2020 and made his first interception against Syracuse and finished the season with 37 tackles, two interceptions and five pass breakups. Against the Notre Dame Fighting Irish, he returned a 93-yard fumble return for the longest fumble return in Georgia Tech history. In 2021, Walton appearing in 10 games and started in 6, recording 19 tackles and his first sack. In his last year at Georgia Tech, he played in all 12 games, totaling 36 tackles, one interception and six pass deflections.

For his final year of eligibility, Walton transferred to the University of Mississippi. In 13 games, he tallied 38 tackles, two interceptions and seven pass deflections.

=== Statistics ===
College statistics
Year	Team	Games	Tackles					Interceptions				Fumbles		
Year	Team	GP	Solo	Ast	Cmb	TfL	Sck	Int	Yds	TD	PD	FR	FF	TD
2018	Georgia Tech	4	3	1	4	0	0.0	0	0	0	3	0	0	0
2019	Georgia Tech	12	23	6	29	0	0.0	0	0	0	3	0	0	0
2020	Georgia Tech	10	24	13	37	1	0.0	2	14	0	5	1	0	1
2021	Georgia Tech	10	13	6	19	2	1.0	0	0	0	0	0	0	0
2022	Georgia Tech	12	24	12	36	0	0.0	1	-8	0	6	0	0	0
2023	Ole Miss	13	23	15	38	4	0.0	2	0	0	7	0	1	0
Career		61	110	53	163	7	1.0	5	6	0	24	1	1	1

== Professional career ==
Pre-draft measurables
Height	Weight	Arm length	Hand span	Wingspan	40-yard dash	10-yard split	20-yard split	20-yard shuttle	Three-cone drill	Vertical jump	Broad jump	Bench press
6 ft 1 3/8 in (1.86 m)	188 lb (85 kg)	30 1/2 in (0.77 m)	9 7/8 in (0.25 m)	6 ft 2 in (1.88 m)	4.52 s	1.58 s	2.60 s	4.35 s	6.90 s	34.5 in (0.88 m)	10 ft 1 in (3.07 m)	11 reps
All values from Pro Day

=== Los Angeles Chargers ===
After not being selected in the 2024 NFL draft, Walton signed with the Los Angeles Chargers as an undrafted free agent. He was waived by the team on August 27.

=== Hamilton Tiger-Cats ===
On January 30, 2025, the Hamilton Tiger-Cats signed Walton. On June 1, he was placed on the practice roster ahead of the 2025 season. He made his CFL debut on August 16, starting at boundary cornerback against the Saskatchewan Roughriders, where he recorded three tackles. He played in two regular season games where he had seven defensive tackles.
