= Jakub Szott =

Canadian gridiron football player (born 1998)

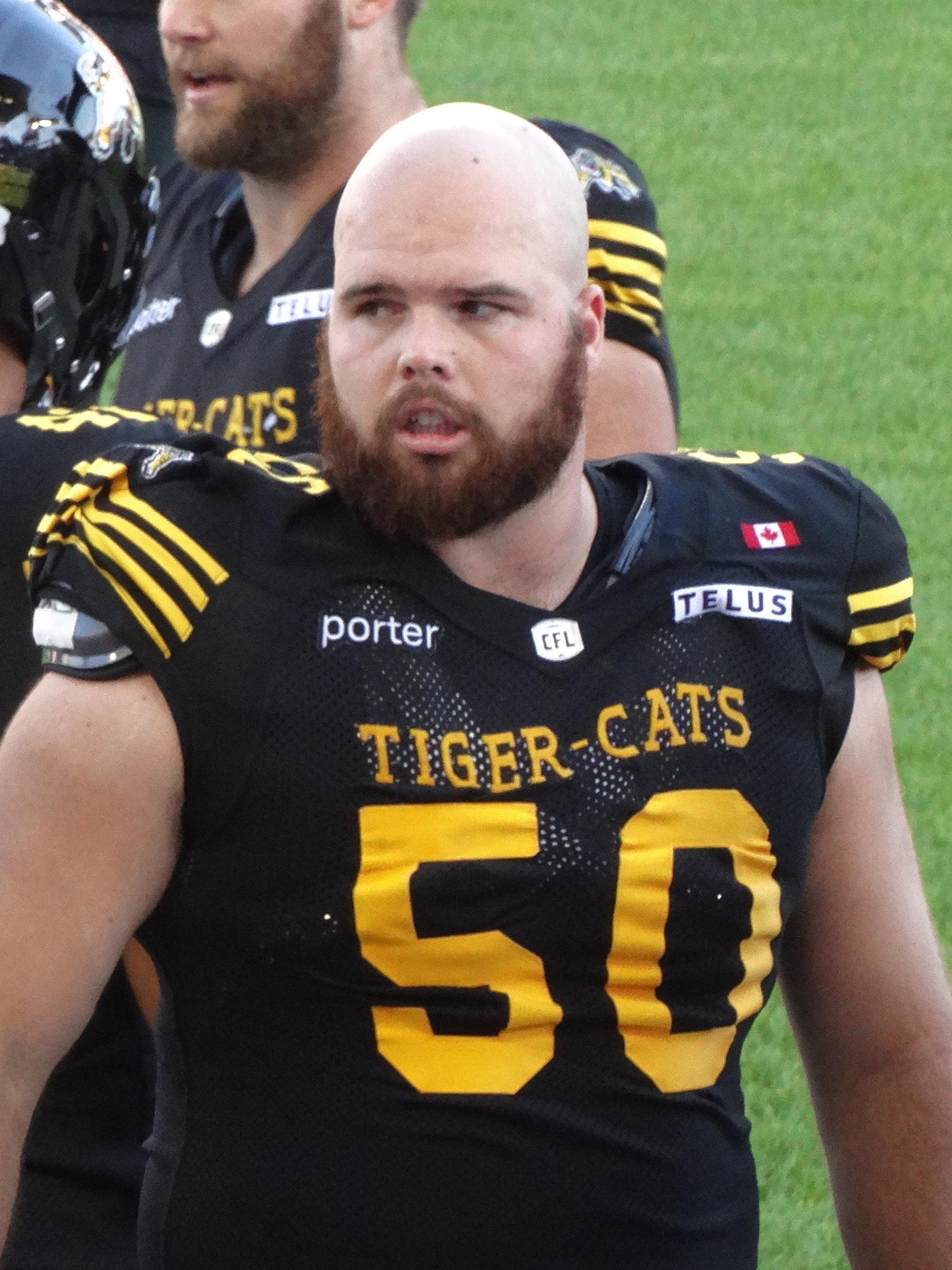
- Szott with the Hamilton Tiger-Cats in 2025

No. 50 – Hamilton Tiger-Cats
- Position: Offensive lineman
- Roster status: Active
- CFL status: National

Personal information
- Born: July 13, 1998 (age 28); Toronto, Ontario, Canada
- Listed height: 6 ft 4 in (1.93 m)
- Listed weight: 290 lb (132 kg)

Career information
- High school: Humberside (Toronto)
- University: McMaster (2016–2019)
- CFL draft: 2020: 4th round, 29th overall pick

Career history
- 2021–2022: Ottawa Redblacks
- 2022: Montreal Alouettes*
- 2023: Winnipeg Blue Bombers
- 2023: Saskatchewan Roughriders*
- 2023: Hamilton Tiger-Cats
- 2024: Edmonton Elks
- 2025–present: Hamilton Tiger-Cats
- * Offseason or practice squad member only
- Stats at CFL.ca

Jakub Szott (born July 13, 1998) is a Canadian professional football offensive lineman for the Hamilton Tiger-Cats of the Canadian Football League (CFL). He played U Sports football at McMaster. He has been a member of the Ottawa Redblacks, Montreal Alouettes, Winnipeg Blue Bombers, Saskatchewan Roughriders, and Edmonton Elks.

== Early life ==
Szott played high school football at Humberside Collegiate Institute in Toronto, Ontario.

== University career ==
Szott played U Sports football at McMaster from 2016 to 2019, appearing in 37 career games.

== Professional career ==
=== Ottawa Redblacks ===
Szott was selected by the Ottawa Redblacks of the Canadian Football League (CFL) in the fourth round, with the 29th overall pick, of the 2020 CFL draft. He signed with the team on January 14, 2021. He dressed in 14 games, starting 13, for the Redblacks in 2021. In 2022, Szott spent time alternating between the practice roster and injured reserve before being released by the Redblacks on August 15, 2022.

=== Montreal Alouettes ===
Szott was signed to the practice roster of the Montreal Alouettes on October 18, 2022. He was released on November 14 and re-signed by the Alouettes on November 22, 2022. Szott was released on May 9, 2023.

=== Winnipeg Blue Bombers ===
Szott signed with the Winnipeg Blue Bombers on May 12, 2023. He was moved between the practice roster and active roster several times during the 2023 season. Overall, he dressed in three games for the Blue Bombers in 2023.

=== Saskatchewan Roughriders ===
Szott was signed to the practice roster of the Saskatchewan Roughriders on July 5, 2023. He was released on August 16, 2023.

=== Hamilton Tiger-Cats (first stint) ===
Szott signed with the Hamilton Tiger-Cats on August 17, 2023. He was placed on injured reserve on October 5, moved to the practice roster on October 26, and released on November 5, 2023. Overall, he dressed for seven games, starting one, for the Tiger-Cats in 2023. Szott re-signed with the Tiger-Cats on December 13, 2023. He was released on June 1, 2024.

=== Edmonton Elks ===
On August 12, 2024, it was announced that Szott had signed with the Edmonton Elks. He dressed in seven games in 2024. He became a free agent upon the expiry of his contract on February 11, 2025.

=== Hamilton Tiger-Cats (second stint) ===
On February 11, 2025, Szott signed a one-year contract with the Hamilton Tiger-Cats.
