= Braxton Hill =

American football player (born 1999)

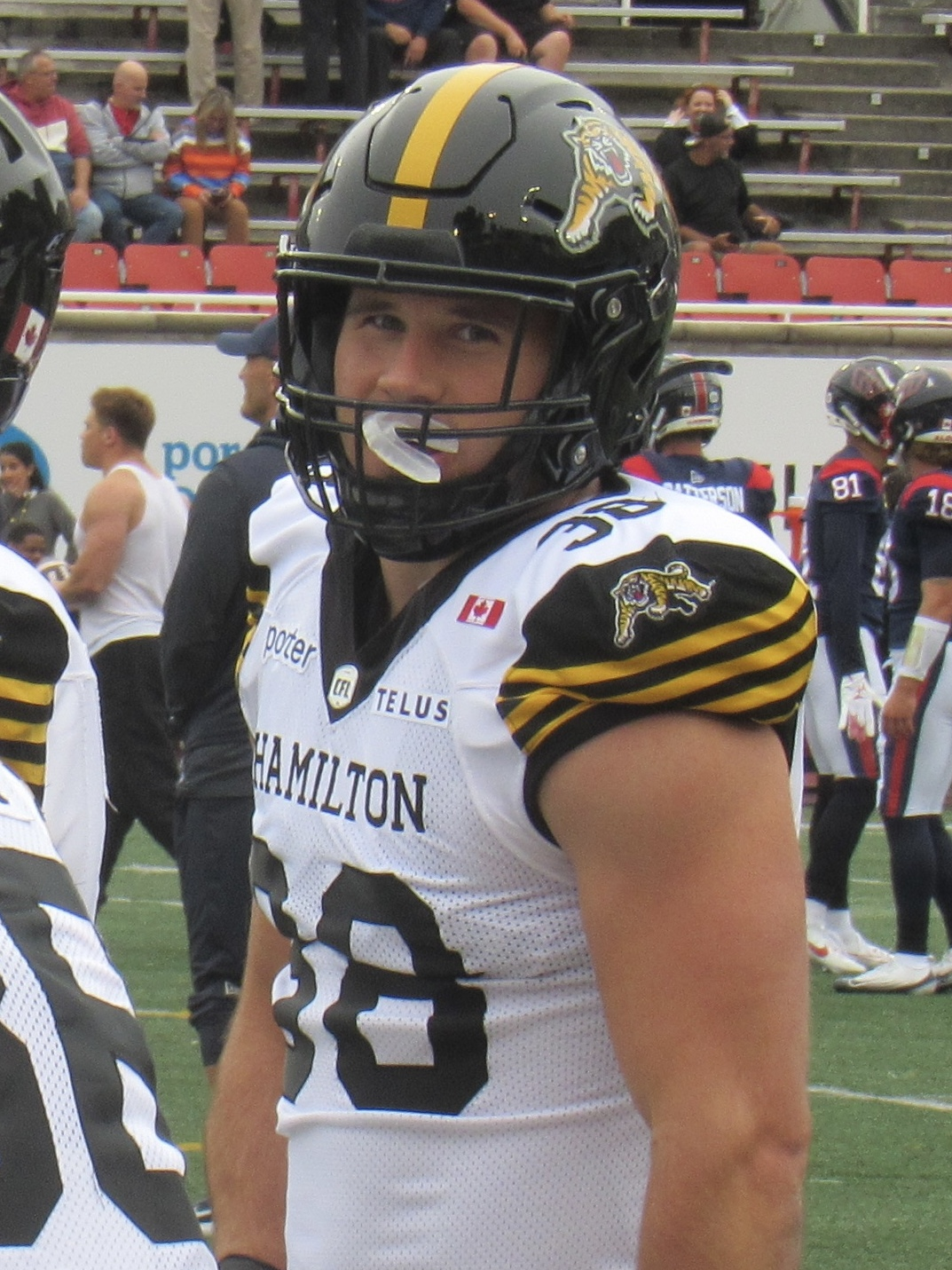
- Hill with the Hamilton Tiger-Cats in 2025

No. 38 – Hamilton Tiger-Cats
- Position: Linebacker
- Roster status: Active
- CFL status: American

Personal information
- Born: October 22, 1999 (age 27)
- Listed height: 6 ft 2 in (1.88 m)
- Listed weight: 225 lb (102 kg)

Career information
- High school: Anaconda (Anaconda, Montana)
- College: Montana
- NFL draft: 2024: undrafted

Career history
- Saskatchewan Roughriders (2024–2025)*; Hamilton Tiger-Cats (2025–present)
- * Offseason or practice squad member only

Awards and highlights
- Second-team All-American (2023); First-team All-Big Sky (2023)
- Stats at CFL.ca

Braxton Hill (born October 22, 1999) is an American professional football linebacker for the Hamilton Tiger-Cats of the Canadian Football League (CFL). Hill played college football for the Montana Grizzlies. He also had a stint with the Saskatchewan Roughriders.

== College career ==
Hill played college football for the Montana Grizzlies from 2019 to 2023. He recorded 231 tackles, including 17 tackles for a loss, nine sacks, two interceptions, eight pass deflections and two fumble recoveries. Hill had a breakout year as a senior in 2023, finishing first in the Big Sky Conference and fifth in the FCS in tackles with 128. He was named a Buck Buchanan Award finalist, earned second-team All-America by Stats Perform and first-team All-Big Sky honors.

== Professional career ==
Pre-draft measurables
Height	Weight	Arm length	Hand span	Wingspan	40-yard dash	10-yard split	20-yard split	20-yard shuttle	Three-cone drill	Vertical jump	Broad jump	Bench press
6 ft 1 7/8 in (1.88 m)	228 lb (103 kg)	31 in (0.79 m)	9 1/8 in (0.23 m)	6 ft 2 5/8 in (1.90 m)	4.77 s	1.62 s	2.78 s	4.29 s	7.01 s	32.5 in (0.83 m)	9 ft 4 in (2.84 m)	15 reps
All values from Pro Day

=== Saskatchewan Roughriders ===
On September 16, 2024, Hill signed with the Saskatchewan Roughriders to the practice roster. He was released by the team on October 14. On November 14, Hill signed a future contract with the Roughriders. He was released on June 1, 2025, as part of roster cut downs. He was later resigned to the practice roster on June 9. Hill was released on August 19 by the Roughriders.

=== Hamilton Tiger-Cats ===
On August 25, Hill was signed to the Hamilton Tiger-Cats practice roster. He made his professional debut on September 1, 2025, against the Toronto Argonauts, registering two special teams tackles.
