= Reggie Stubblefield =

American gridiron football player (born 1998)

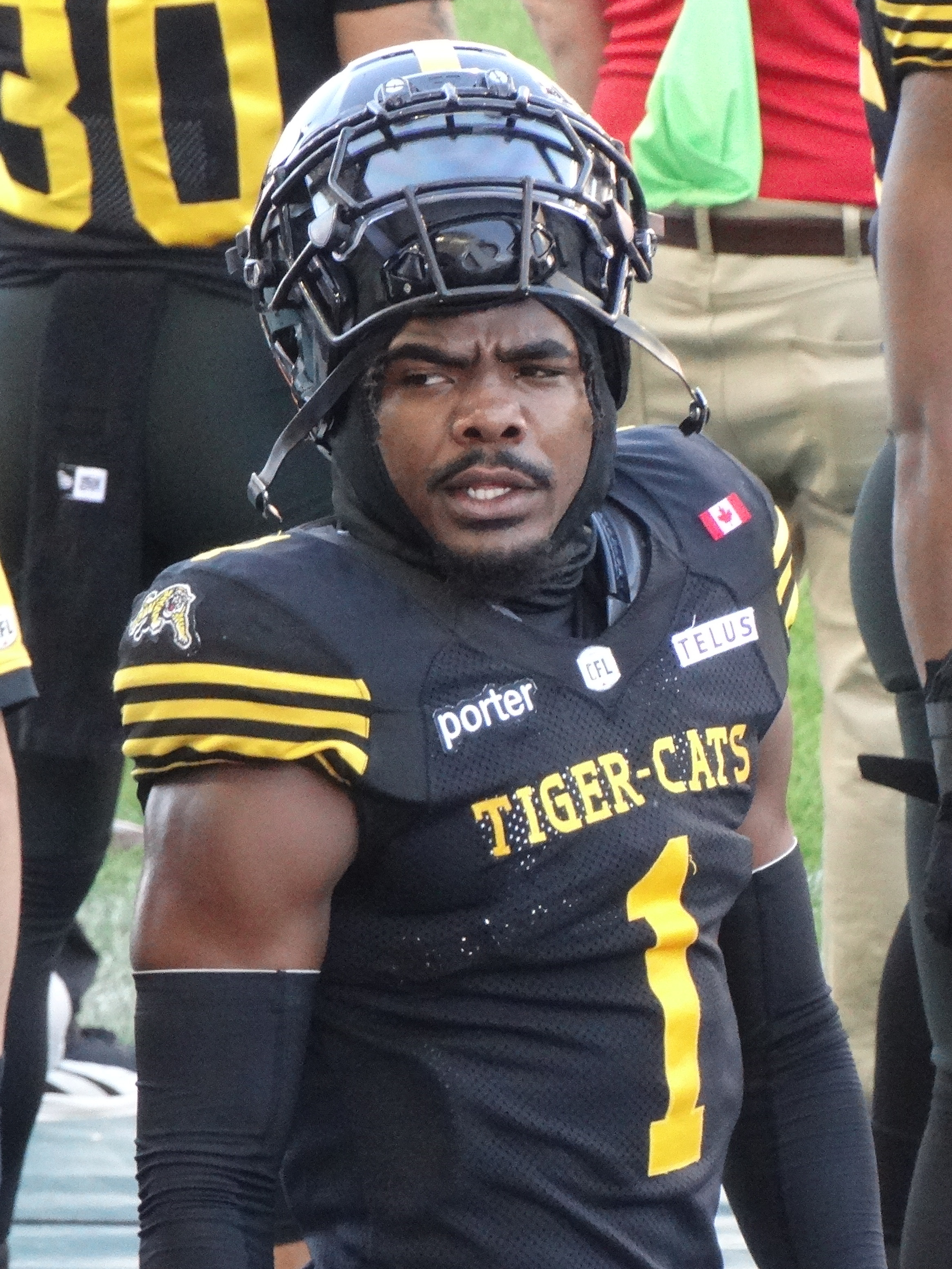
- Stubblefield with the Hamilton Tiger-Cats in 2025

No. 1 – Hamilton Tiger-Cats
- Position: Defensive back
- Roster status: Active
- CFL status: American

Personal information
- Born: August 27, 1998 (age 28); Lubbock, Texas, U. S.
- Listed height: 5 ft 11 in (1.80 m)
- Listed weight: 192 lb (87 kg)

Career information
- High school: Sam Houston High
- College: Kansas State; Prairie View A&M

Career history
- 2023: DC Defenders*
- 2023–2024: Montreal Alouettes
- 2025–present: Hamilton Tiger-Cats
- * Offseason or practice squad member only

Awards and highlights
- Grey Cup champion (2023)

Career CFL statistics as of 2026
- Total tackles: 191
- Sacks: 8
- Forced fumbles: 3
- Fumble recoveries: 1
- Pass knockdowns: 20
- Interceptions: 5
- Stats at CFL.ca

Reggie Stubblefield (born August 27, 1998) is an American professional football defensive back for the Hamilton Tiger-Cats of the Canadian Football League (CFL).

== College career ==
Stubblefield first played college football for the Prairie View A&M Panthers from 2016 to 2020 while using a medical redshirt season in 2018. He played in 20 games and recorded 117 tackles, three interceptions, 19 pass knockdowns, and two forced fumbles. He then transferred to Kansas State University to play for the Wildcats in 2021. In his final year of eligibility, he played in 12 games, starting in six, where he had 34 tackles, one sack, and two pass knockdowns.

== Professional career ==
Pre-draft measurables
Height	Weight	Arm length	Hand span	Wingspan	40-yard dash	10-yard split	20-yard split	20-yard shuttle	Three-cone drill	Vertical jump	Broad jump	Bench press
5 ft 11 in (1.80 m)	192 lb (87 kg)	29 5/8 in (0.75 m)	9 1/2 in (0.24 m)	6 ft 0 in (1.83 m)	4.61 s	1.62 s	2.73 s	4.35 s	7.07 s	33 in (0.84 m)	9 ft 8 in (2.95 m)	14 reps
All values from Pro Day

=== DC Defenders ===
In November 2022, Stubblefield was selected by the DC Defenders in the 2023 XFL draft. He was released by the Defenders on February 9, 2023.

=== Montreal Alouettes ===
On March 1, 2023, it was announced that Stubblefield had signed with the Montreal Alouettes. He played in the preseason, but was among the team's final roster cuts on June 3, 2023. However, following injuries to the team's secondary, Stubblefield was re-signed on June 26, 2023, to the team's practice roster. He then made his professional debut on July 1, 2023, against the Winnipeg Blue Bombers. He played and started in 13 regular season games where he recorded 38 defensive tackles, three special teams tackles, three sacks, two interceptions, nine pass knockdowns, and one forced fumble. At season's end, he was named the Alouettes' nominee for the CFL's Most Outstanding Rookie Award.

In 2024, Stubblefield suffered a torn ACL in the team's first game of the regular season, where he recorded four defensive tackles and one special teams tackle. He was on the six-game injured list for the remainder of the year. He became a free agent upon the expiry of his contract on February 11, 2025.

=== Hamilton Tiger-Cats ===
On February 12, 2025, it was announced that Stubblefield had signed with the Hamilton Tiger-Cats to a three-year contract.

== Personal life ==
Stubblefield was born in Lubbock, Texas, to parents Neoma Humphery and Reggie Stubblefield. He has three siblings.
