= Brandon Revenberg =

Canadian gridiron football player (born 1992)

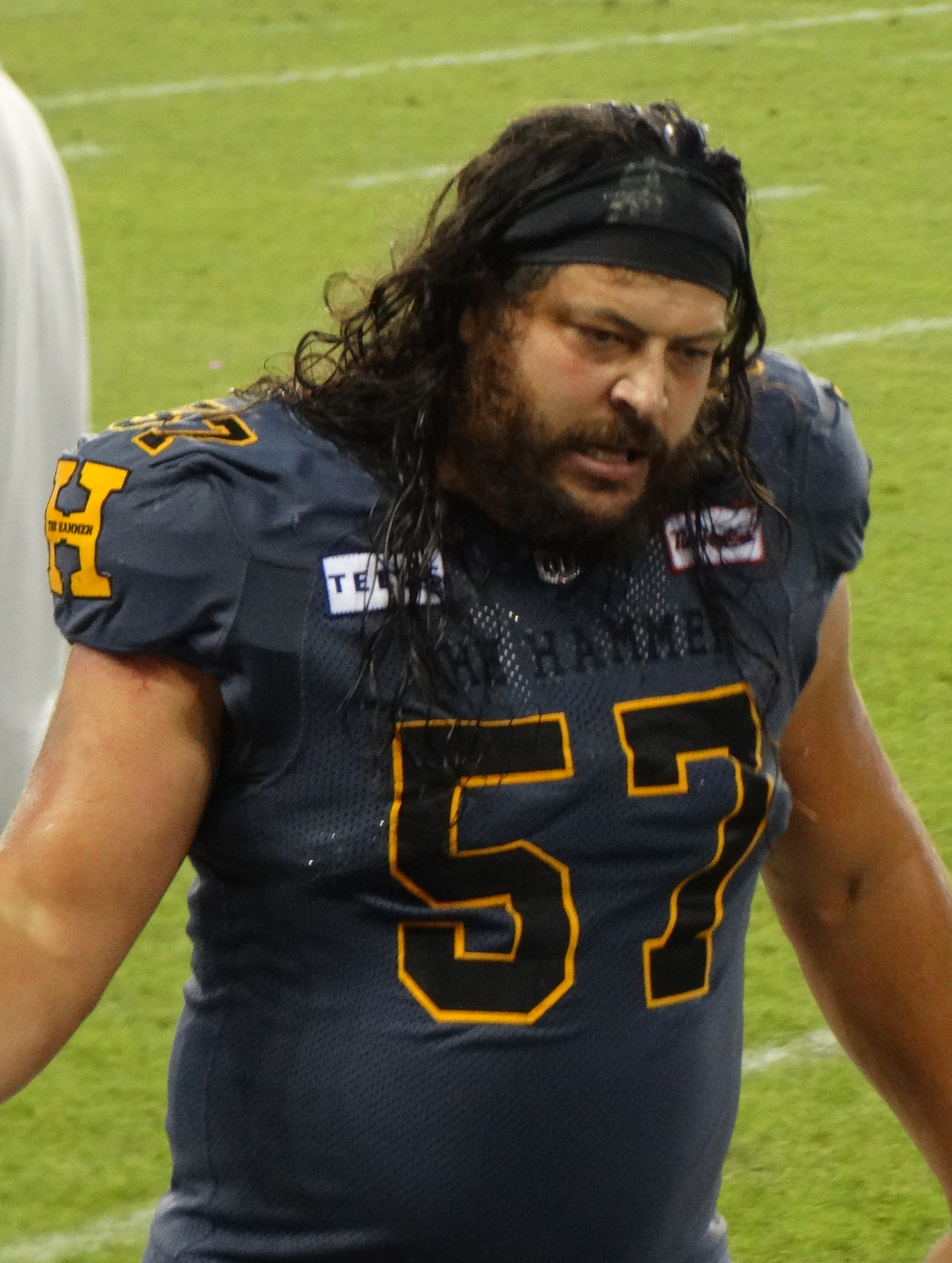
- Revenberg with the Hamilton Tiger-Cats in 2024

No. 57 – Hamilton Tiger-Cats
- Position: Offensive lineman
- Roster status: Active
- CFL status: National

Personal information
- Born: December 16, 1992 (age 33); Essex, Ontario, Canada
- Listed height: 6 ft 4 in (1.93 m)
- Listed weight: 300 lb (136 kg)

Career information
- High school: Essex District
- College: Grand Valley State
- CFL draft: 2016: 1st round, 3rd overall pick

Career history
- 2016–present: Hamilton Tiger-Cats

Awards and highlights
- 4× Leo Dandurand Trophy (2018, 2021, 2022, 2025); 5× CFL All-Star (2018, 2019, 2021, 2022, 2025); 7× CFL East All-Star (2018, 2019, 2021, 2022, 2023, 2025, 2026)
- Stats at CFL.ca

Brandon Revenberg (born December 16, 1992) is a Canadian professional football offensive lineman for the Hamilton Tiger-Cats of the Canadian Football League (CFL).

== College career ==
Revenberg played college football for the Grand Valley State Lakers.

== Professional career ==
Pre-draft measurables
Height	Weight	Arm length	Hand span	Wingspan	Bench press
6 ft 3 7/8 in (1.93 m)	288 lb (131 kg)	31 7/8 in (0.81 m)	9 7/8 in (0.25 m)	6 ft 5 3/8 in (1.97 m)	38 reps
All values from Pro Day

Revenberg was drafted third overall by the Tiger-Cats in the 2016 CFL draft and signed with the team on May 27, 2016.

In 2019, he was the Hamilton Tiger-Cats Most Outstanding Canadian. He re-signed with the Tiger-Cats on January 13, 2021.
