= Mario Kendricks Jr. =

American football player (born 2000)

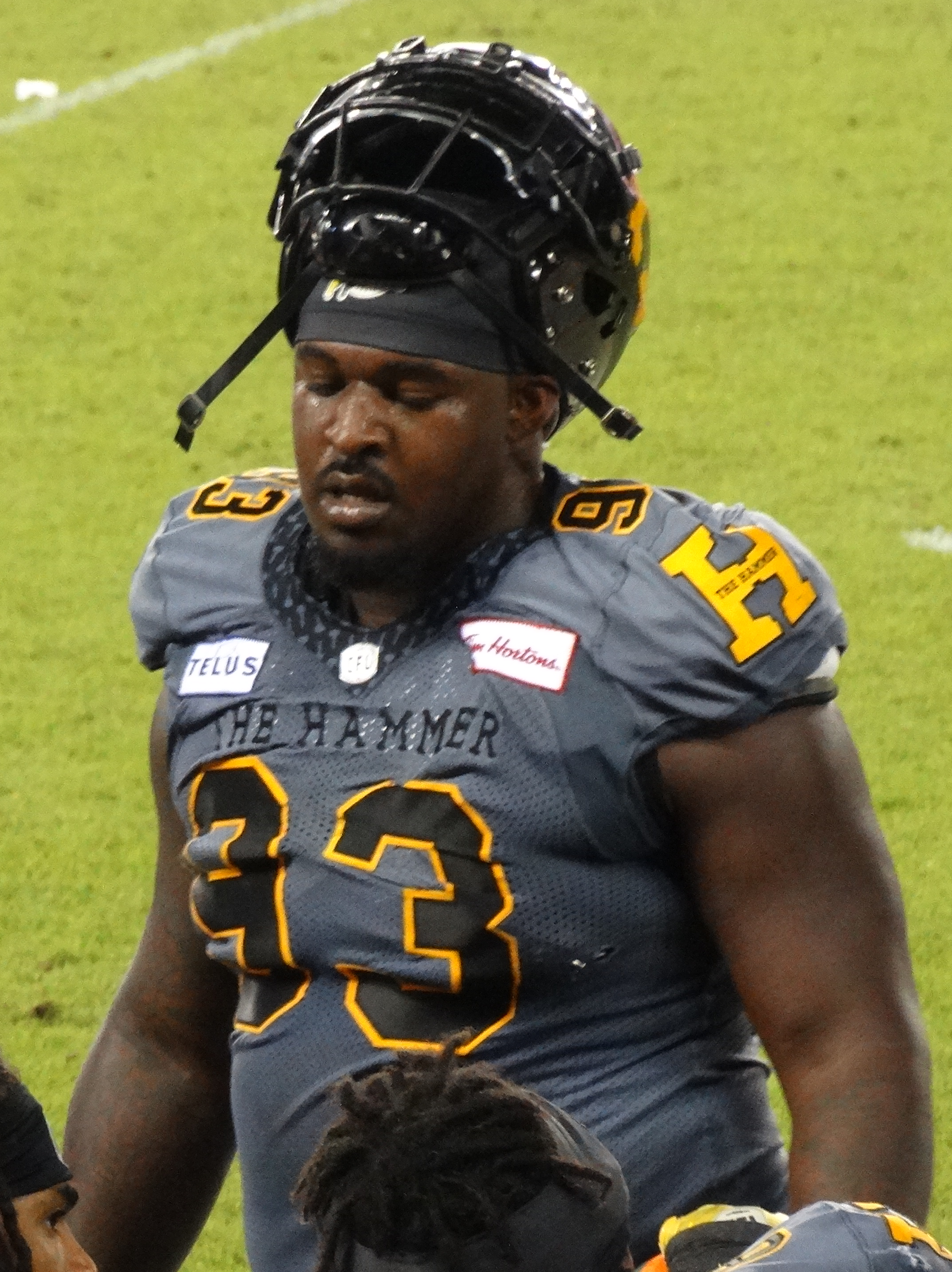
- Kendricks with the Hamilton Tiger-Cats in 2025

No. 90 – Hamilton Tiger-Cats
- Position: Defensive lineman
- Roster status: Active
- CFL status: American

Personal information
- Born: October 18, 2000 (age 26)
- Listed height: 6 ft 0 in (1.83 m)
- Listed weight: 294 lb (133 kg)

Career information
- High school: Osceola (Kissimmee, Florida)
- College: Virginia Tech (2019–2023)
- NFL draft: 2024: undrafted

Career history
- Miami Dolphins (2024)*; Seattle Seahawks (2024)*; Hamilton Tiger-Cats (2024–present)
- * Offseason or practice squad member only
- Stats at CFL.ca

Mario Kendricks Jr. (born October 18, 2000) is an American professional football defensive lineman for the Hamilton Tiger-Cats of the Canadian Football League (CFL). Kendricks played college football for the Virginia Tech Hokies. He has also had stints with the Miami Dolphins and the Seattle Seahawks of the National Football League (NFL).

== Early life ==
Kendricks was born on October 18, 2000. He attended and played high school football at Osceola High School in Kissimmee, Florida. Kendricks was three-star recruit by both 247Sports and Rivals, and the No. 76 defensive tackle in the country by 247Sports.

== College career ==
Kendricks played college football for the Virginia Tech Hokies from 2019 to 2023. He played in 56 games for the Hokies, starting in 20, finishing with 67 tackles, including 16 tackles for loss, seven sacks and three pass deflections.

== Professional career ==
Pre-draft measurables
Height	Weight	Arm length	Hand span	Wingspan	40-yard dash	10-yard split	20-yard split	20-yard shuttle	Three-cone drill	Vertical jump	Broad jump	Bench press
6 ft 0 1/4 in (1.84 m)	293 lb (133 kg)	32 7/8 in (0.84 m)	9 3/8 in (0.24 m)	6 ft 6 1/2 in (1.99 m)	4.80 s	1.58 s	2.76 s	4.46 s	7.25 s	32.5 in (0.83 m)	9 ft 0 in (2.74 m)	27 reps
All values from Pro Day

=== Miami Dolphins ===
After going undrafted in the 2024 NFL draft, Kendricks signed with the Miami Dolphins as an undrafted free agent. He was waived on July 31.

=== Seattle Seahawks ===
On August 8, it was announced that the Seattle Seahawks signed Kendricks. On August 27, he was released by the team as part of their final roster cuts.

=== Hamilton Tiger-Cats ===
On September 8, the Hamilton Tiger-Cats signed Kendricks to the practice roster. He dressed in two games in 2024, recording two tackles and one sack against the Toronto Argonauts.

On January 28, 2925, Kendricks resigned with the Tiger-Cats.
