= Ante Milanovic-Litre =

Canadian gridiron football player (born 1994)

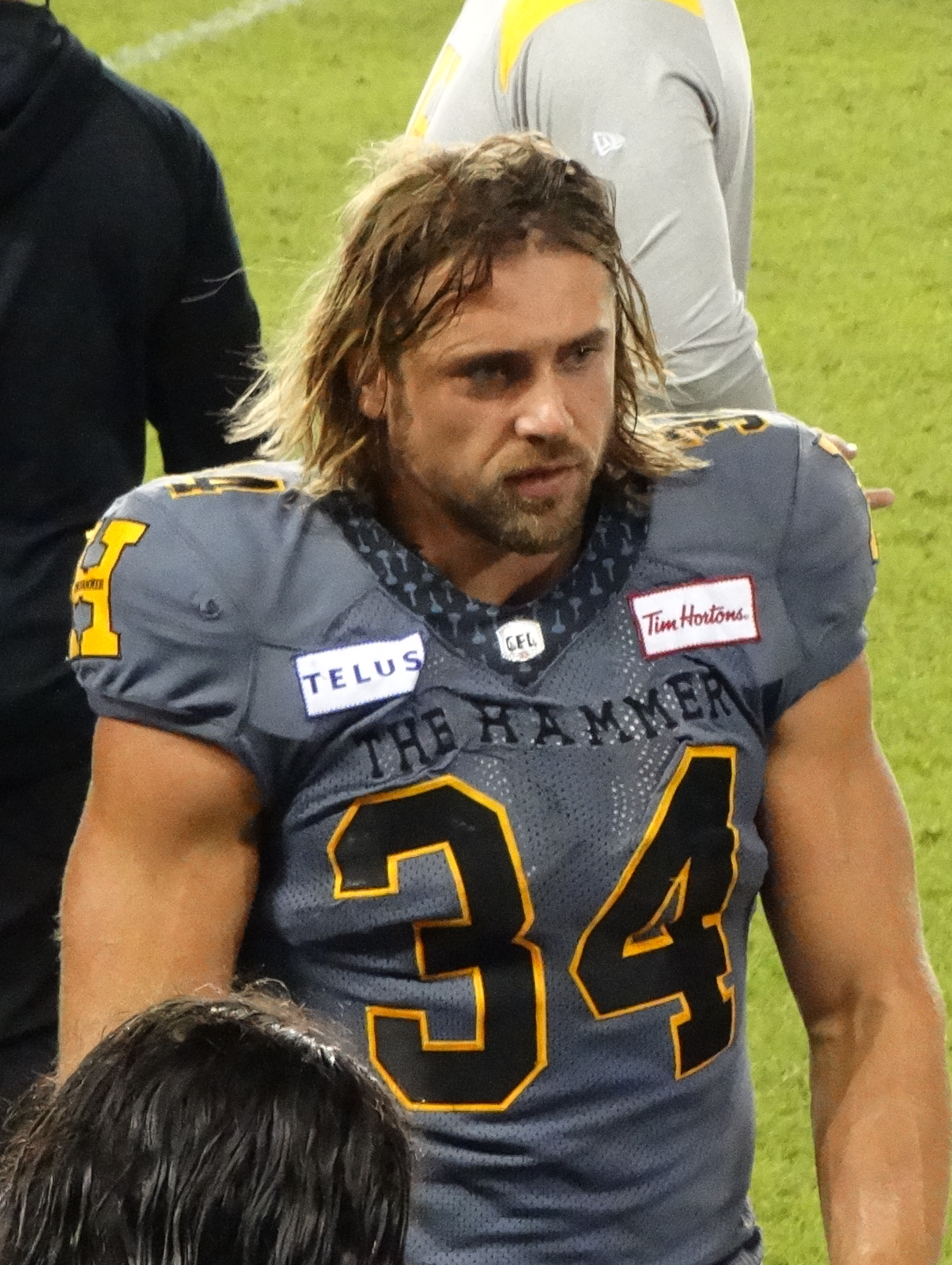
- Milanovic-Litre with the Hamilton Tiger-Cats in 2024

Hamilton Tiger-Cats
- Positions: Running back, Fullback
- Roster status: Active
- CFL status: National

Personal information
- Born: October 17, 1994 (age 32); Vancouver, British Columbia, Canada
- Listed height: 5 ft 11 in (1.80 m)
- Listed weight: 223 lb (101 kg)

Career information
- High school: Notre Dame
- College: Simon Fraser
- CFL draft: 2017: 4th round, 28th overall pick

Career history
- 2017–2021: Calgary Stampeders
- 2022: Edmonton Elks
- 2023: Ottawa Redblacks
- 2024–present: Hamilton Tiger-Cats

Awards and highlights
- Grey Cup champion (2018)
- Stats at CFL.ca (archive)

Ante Milanovic-Litre (born October 17, 1994) is a Canadian professional football running back and fullback for the Hamilton Tiger-Cats of the Canadian Football League (CFL).

== University career ==
Milanovic-Litre played college football for the Simon Fraser Clan.

== Professional career ==
=== Calgary Stampeders ===
Milanovic-Litre was drafted in fourth round, 28th overall, in the 2017 CFL draft by the Calgary Stampeders and was signed on May 18, 2017. He won his first Grey Cup as a member of the Stampeders 106th Grey Cup championship team in 2018.

=== Edmonton Elks ===
Milanovic-Litre joined the Edmonton Elks in free agency on February 14, 2022. He played in all 18 regular season games where he had 54 carries for 241 yards and one touchdown along with 16 receptions for 89 yards. He became a free agent upon the expiry of his contract on February 14, 2023.

=== Ottawa Redblacks ===
On February 15, 2023, it was announced that Milanovic-Litre had signed a one-year contract with the Ottawa Redblacks. He played in 16 regular season games where he had 17 carries for 55 yards and three touchdowns. As a pending free agent, he was released in the following off-season on February 6, 2024.

=== Hamilton Tiger-Cats ===
On February 7, 2024, it was announced that Milanovic-Litre had signed with the Hamilton Tiger-Cats.
