= 1949 Montreal Alouettes season =

Canadian football team season

- Head coach: Lew Hayman
- Home stadium: Delorimier Stadium

Results
- Record: 8–4
- Division place: 2nd, East
- Playoffs: Won Grey Cup

Uniform

The 1949 Montreal Alouettes finished the season in second place in the Interprovincial Rugby Football Union with an 8–4 record and won the Grey Cup.

== Preseason ==
Game	Date	Opponent	Results		Venue	Attendance
Game	Date	Opponent	Score	Record	Venue	Attendance
1	Aug 25	vs. Calgary Stampeders	W 14–13	1–0	Delorimier Stadium	18,000

== Regular season ==
=== Standings ===
Interprovincial Rugby Football Union
Team	GP	W	L	T	PF	PA	Pts
Ottawa Rough Riders	12	11	1	0	261	170	22
Montreal Alouettes	12	8	4	0	295	204	16
Toronto Argonauts	12	5	7	0	209	254	10
Hamilton Wildcats	12	0	12	0	147	284	0

=== Schedule ===
Week	Game	Date	Opponent	Results		Venue	Attendance
Week	Game	Date	Opponent	Score	Record	Venue	Attendance
1	1	Aug 27	vs. Ottawa Rough Riders	L 6–7	0–1	Delorimier Stadium	14,958
2	2	Sept 3	at Ottawa Rough Riders	L 21–22	0–2	Lansdowne Park	16,000
3	3	Sept 10	at Hamilton Wildcats	W 38–16	1–2	Ivor Wynne Stadium	7,500
4	4	Sept 17	at Toronto Argonauts	W 24–11	2–2	Varsity Stadium	19,000
5	5	Sept 24	vs. Toronto Argonauts	L 14–29	2–3	Delorimier Stadium	16,000
6	Bye						
7	6	Oct 8	at Ottawa Rough Riders	W 20–19	3–3	Lansdowne Park	14,000
7	7	Oct 9	vs. Ottawa Rough Riders	L 33–42	3–4	Delorimier Stadium	20,000
8	8	Oct 15	at Toronto Argonauts	W 24–16	4–4	Varsity Stadium	19,000
8	9	Oct 16	vs. Hamilton Wildcats	W 29–16	5–4	Delorimier Stadium	14,000
9	10	Oct 22	at Hamilton Wildcats	W 22–6	6–4	Ivor Wynne Stadium	5,000
10	11	Oct 30	vs. Hamilton Wildcats	W 29–18	7–4	Delorimier Stadium	15,000
11	12	Nov 5	vs. Toronto Argonauts	W 35–2	8–4	Delorimier Stadium	6,729

== Postseason ==
Game	Date	Opponent	Results		Venue	Attendance
Game	Date	Opponent	Score	Record	Venue	Attendance
I.R.F.U. Final 1	Nov 9	vs. Ottawa Rough Riders	W 22–7	1–0	Delorimier Stadium	15,272
I.R.F.U. Final 2	Nov 12	at Ottawa Rough Riders	W 14–13	2–0	Lansdowne Park	17,000
Eastern Final	Nov 19	vs. Hamilton Tigers	W 40–0	3–0	Delorimier Stadium	15,000
Grey Cup	Nov 26	vs. Calgary Stampeders	W 28–15	4–0	Varsity Stadium	20,087

=== Grey Cup ===
Team	Q1	Q2	Q3	Q4	Total
Montreal Alouettes	12	5	9	2	28
Calgary Stampeders	7	0	0	8	15
