= Pat Santucci =

Canadian football player (1924–1992)

Profile
- Position: Tackle

Personal information
- Born: 1924
- Died: October 30, 1992 (aged 68); Burlington, Ontario, Canada
- Listed height: 5 ft 11 in (1.80 m)
- Listed weight: 215 lb (98 kg)

Career history
- 1943: Hamilton Flying Wildcats
- 1944: St. Hyacinthe-Donnacona Navy
- 1945: Montreal Hornets
- 1946: Toronto Argonauts
- 1947–48: Hamilton Tigers
- 1949: Saskatchewan Roughriders
- 1950: Hamilton Tiger-Cats

Awards and highlights
- 3× Grey Cup champion (1943, 44, 46); CFL East All-Star (1948); CFL West All-Star (1949)

Pat Santucci (1924 – October 30, 1992) was an all-star and Grey Cup champion Canadian football player, playing from 1943 to 1950.

Santucci began his well traveled football career with the Hamilton Flying Wildcats in 1943, winning the Grey Cup that season. His next year was spent with the St. Hyacinthe-Donnacona Navy squadron, winning yet another Cup. He owns the unique distinction of being the only player to win two Grey Cups with armed service teams.

The end of the war found Santucci with the Montreal Hornets in 1945, but it was the move to the Toronto Argonauts in 1946 that got him his third Earl Grey Grey Cup in four seasons. He played 11 regular season and two playoff games with the Scullers.

Some of his finest years were still ahead of him. Two years with the Hamilton Tigers saw him selected as an all-star in 1948. In 1949 he moved west, again an all-star with the Saskatchewan Roughriders. His career ended in 1950 and fittingly, for a former Hamilton Wildcat and Tiger, he played with the inaugural Hamilton Tiger-Cats team.

Santucci was also an effective kicker throughout his career. In one memorable game, the Tigers won 14–8, with Santucci scoring all Hamilton points. He kicked two field goals and blocked a punt which he recovered for a touchdown. He also tackled an opposing runner for a safety.

Santucci, owner of Santucci Travel with his daughters (Patricia, Barbara, Deborah), served as president of the Burlington Minor Football Association and was an original director of the Burlington International Games.

He died of cancer in October 1992.
