= 1949 Hamilton Tigers season =

Canadian football team season

- Head coach: Murray Griffin
- Home stadium: Civic Stadium

Results
- Record: 10–2
- Division place: 1st, ORFU
- Playoffs: Lost East Final

The 1949 Hamilton Tigers season was the second for the club in the Ontario Rugby Football Union after playing in the Interprovincial Rugby Football Union for 34 seasons since 1907. This would also be the last season for the Tigers as the club would merge with the Hamilton Wildcats following this season.

The Tigers finished in 1st place in the ORFU with a 10–2 record, but lost to the Montreal Alouettes in the Eastern Final.

== Preseason ==
Week	Date	Opponent	Result	Record
A	Aug 13	Ottawa Rough Riders	L 1–25	0–1
B	Aug 17	Winnipeg Blue Bombers	W 9–8	1–1
C	Aug 24	Hamilton Wildcats	L 5–24	1–2

== Regular season ==
=== Season standings ===
Ontario Rugby Football Union
Team	GP	W	L	T	PF	PA	Pts
Hamilton Tigers	12	10	2	0	228	68	20
Sarnia Imperials	12	8	4	0	142	101	16
Windsor Rockets	12	5	7	0	142	108	10
Toronto Balmy Beach Beachers	12	1	11	0	55	290	2

=== Season schedule ===
Week	Date	Opponent	Result	Record
1	Sept 3	vs. Sarnia Imperials	L 6–7	0–1
2	Sept 10	at Sarnia Imperials	L 11–13	0–2
3	Sept 17	vs. Toronto Balmy Beach Beachers	W 45–2	1–2
4	Sept 24	at Toronto Balmy Beach Beachers	W 18–6	2–2
5	Oct 1	vs. Windsor Rockets	W 20–6	3–2
6	Oct 8	at Windsor Rockets	W 13–6	4–2
6	Oct 10	vs. Sarnia Imperials	W 15–2	5–2
7	Oct 15	at Sarnia Imperials	W 13–11	6–2
8	Oct 22	at Windsor Rockets	W 5–3	7–2
9	Oct 26	at Toronto Balmy Beach Beachers	W 14–0	8–2
9	Oct 29	vs. Windsor Rockets	W 29–5	9–2
10	Nov 5	vs. Toronto Balmy Beach Beachers	W 39–7	10–2

== Playoffs ==
=== Schedule ===
Week	Date	Opponent	Result
IRFU Final #1	Nov 11	at Sarnia Imperials	L 6–15
IRFU Final #2	Nov 12	Sarnia Imperials	W 20–3
Eastern Final	Nov 19	at Montreal Alouettes	L 0–40
