= 1949 Ottawa Rough Riders season =

Canadian football team season

- Head coach: Wally Masters
- Home stadium: Lansdowne Park

Results
- Record: 11–1
- Division place: 1st, IRFU
- Playoffs: Lost IRFU Finals

The 1949 Ottawa Rough Riders finished in first place in the Interprovincial Rugby Football Union with an 11–1 record, but lost the IRFU Finals to the eventual Grey Cup champion Montreal Alouettes. This season was the best in franchise history, in terms of winning percentage, since the undefeated team from the 1905 season. This season also set the franchise record for most wins in a season, which would be matched, but not surpassed, four more times.

== Preseason ==
Game	Date	Opponent	Results		Venue	Attendance
Game	Date	Opponent	Score	Record	Venue	Attendance
A	Sat, Aug 13	vs. Hamilton Tigers	W 25–1	1–0	Lansdowne Park	9,000

== Regular season ==
=== Standings ===
Interprovincial Rugby Football Union
Team	GP	W	L	T	PF	PA	Pts
Ottawa Rough Riders	12	11	1	0	261	170	22
Montreal Alouettes	12	8	4	0	295	204	16
Toronto Argonauts	12	5	7	0	209	254	10
Hamilton Wildcats	12	0	12	0	147	284	0

=== Schedule ===
Week	Game	Date	Opponent	Results		Venue	Attendance
Week	Game	Date	Opponent	Score	Record	Venue	Attendance
1	1	Sat, Aug 27	at Montreal Alouettes	W 7–6	1–0	Delorimier Stadium	14,958
2	2	Mon, Sept 3	vs. Montreal Alouettes	W 22–21	2–0	Lansdowne Park	14,958
3	3	Mon, Sept 10	at Toronto Argonauts	W 33–8	3–0	Varsity Stadium	19,000
4	4	Mon, Sept 17	vs. Hamilton Wildcats	W 11–6	4–0	Lansdowne Park	8,000
5	5	Mon, Sept 24	at Hamilton Wildcats	W 17–10	5–0	Civic Stadium	7,000
6	6	Sat, Oct 1	vs. Toronto Argonauts	W 20–18	6–0	Lansdowne Park	16,424
7	7	Sat, Oct 8	vs. Montreal Alouettes	L 13–25	6–1	Lansdowne Park	14,000
7	8	Sun, Oct 9	at Montreal Alouettes	W 12–9	7–1	Delorimier Stadium	20,000
8	9	Sat, Oct 15	at Hamilton Wildcats	W 28–19	8–1	Civic Stadium	5,000
9	10	Sat, Oct 22	at Toronto Argonauts	W 32–16	9–1	Varsity Stadium	19,000
10	11	Sat, Oct 29	vs. Toronto Argonauts	W 13–9	10–1	Lansdowne Park	15,000
11	12	Sat, Nov 5	vs. Hamilton Wildcats	W 23–18	11–1	Lansdowne Park	9,000

== Postseason ==
=== Playoffs ===
Round	Date	Opponent	Results		Venue	Attendance
Round	Date	Opponent	Score	Record	Venue	Attendance
IRFU Final #1	Wed, Nov 9	at Montreal Alouettes	L 7–22	0–1	Delorimier Stadium	15,272
IRFU Final #2	Sat, Nov 12	vs. Montreal Alouettes	L 13–14	0–2	Lansdowne Park	17,000
