= 1949 Toronto Argonauts season =

CFL team season

- Head coach: Teddy Morris
- Home stadium: Varsity Stadium

Results
- Record: 5–7
- Division place: 3rd, IRFU
- Playoffs: did not qualify

The 1949 Toronto Argonauts finished in third place in the Interprovincial Rugby Football Union with a 5–7 record and failed to make the playoffs.

== Regular season ==
=== Standings ===
Interprovincial Rugby Football Union
Team	GP	W	L	T	PF	PA	Pts
Ottawa Rough Riders	12	11	1	0	261	170	22
Montreal Alouettes	12	8	4	0	295	204	16
Toronto Argonauts	12	5	7	0	209	254	10
Hamilton Wildcats	12	0	12	0	147	284	0

=== Schedule ===
Week	Game	Date	Opponent	Results		Venue
Week	Game	Date	Opponent	Score	Record	Venue
1	1	Sept 3	vs. Hamilton Wildcats	W 26–18	1–0	Varsity Stadium
1	2	Sept 5	at Hamilton Wildcats	W 36–14	2–0	Civic Stadium
2	3	Sept 10	vs. Ottawa Rough Riders	L 1–19	2–1	Varsity Stadium
3	4	Sept 17	vs. Montreal Alouettes	L 11–24	2–2	Varsity Stadium
4	5	Sept 24	at Montreal Alouettes	W 29–14	3–2	Delorimier Stadium
5	6	Oct 1	at Ottawa Rough Riders	L 11–34	3–3	Lansdowne Park
6	7	Oct 8	at Hamilton Wildcats	W 11–10	4–3	Civic Stadium
6	8	Oct 10	vs. Hamilton Wildcats	W 29–8	5–3	Varsity Stadium
7	9	Oct 15	vs. Montreal Alouettes	L 16–24	5–4	Varsity Stadium
8	10	Oct 22	vs. Ottawa Rough Riders	L 13–24	5–5	Varsity Stadium
9	11	Oct 29	at Ottawa Rough Riders	L 24–30	5–6	Lansdowne Park
10	12	Nov 5	at Montreal Alouettes	L 2–35	5–7	Delorimier Stadium
