= 1949 Hamilton Wildcats season =

- Head coach: Frank Gnup
- Home stadium: Ivor Wynne Stadium

Results
- Record: 0–12
- Division place: 4th, IRFU
- Playoffs: Did not qualify

The 1949 Hamilton Wildcats season was the ninth in franchise history and second for the club in Interprovincial Rugby Football Union. This would also be the last season for the Wildcats as the club would merge with the Hamilton Tigers following this season.

The Wildcats finished in 4th place in the IRFU with a 0–12 record and did not qualify for the playoffs.

== Preseason ==
Week	Date	Opponent	Result	Record
A	Aug 24	Hamilton Tigers	W 24–5	1–0

== Regular season ==
=== Season standings ===
Interprovincial Rugby Football Union
Team	GP	W	L	T	PF	PA	Pts
Ottawa Rough Riders	12	11	1	0	261	170	22
Montreal Alouettes	12	8	4	0	295	204	16
Toronto Argonauts	12	5	7	0	209	254	10
Hamilton Wildcats	12	0	12	0	147	284	0

=== Season schedule ===
Week	Date	Opponent	Result	Record
1	Sept 3	at Toronto Argonauts	L 18–26	0–1
1	Sept 5	vs. Toronto Argonauts	L 14–36	0–2
2	Sept 10	vs. Montreal Alouettes	L 16–38	0–3
3	Sept 17	at Ottawa Rough Riders	L 12–19	0–4
4	Sept 24	vs. Ottawa Rough Riders	L 11–14	0–5
5	Bye			
6	Oct 8	vs. Toronto Argonauts	L 10–11	0–6
6	Oct 10	at Toronto Argonauts	L 8–29	0–7
7	Oct 15	vs. Ottawa Rough Riders	L 7–12	0–8
7	Oct 16	at Montreal Alouettes	L 16–29	0–9
8	Oct 22	vs. Montreal Alouettes	L 6–22	0–10
9	Oct 30	at Montreal Alouettes	L 18–29	0–11
10	Nov 5	at Ottawa Rough Riders	L 11–19	0–12
