= Juan Sheridan =

Canadian football player (1925–1969)

Profile
- Positions: Guard, Offensive tackle

Personal information
- Born: February 2, 1925; Havana, Cuba
- Died: October 7, 1969 (aged 44); Howick, Quebec, Canada

Career history
- 1944: St. Hyacinthe-Donnacona Navy
- 1946–1947: Toronto Indians
- 1948: Toronto Balmy Beach Beachers
- 1949–1957: Montreal Alouettes

Awards and highlights
- 2× Grey Cup champion (1944, 1949)

Juan Sheridan (February 2, 1925 – October 7, 1969) was a Grey Cup champion Canadian Football League player.

Sheridan won his first Grey Cup with Montreal St. Hyacinthe-Donnacona Navy team in 1944 (when league play was suspended during World War II.) After three seasons in the Ontario Rugby Football Union with the Toronto Indians and Toronto Balmy Beach Beachers, he began a nine-year career with the Montreal Alouettes. Over the course of 105 regular season games he scored only 1 touchdown, but his football fame came as a member of the Als first Grey Cup winning team in 1949.

Sheridan spoke Russian fluently, and translated on behalf of the Soviet Union national ice hockey team on their tour of Canada in 1962.

Sheridan died of a heart attack on October 7, 1969, in Howick, Quebec, aged 44.
