= 1943 Hamilton Wildcats season =

Canadian football team season

- Head coach: Brian Timmis
- Home stadium: Ivor Wynne Stadium

Results
- Record: 8–1–1
- Division place: 1st, ORFU
- Playoffs: Won Grey Cup

The 1943 Hamilton Wildcats season was the third in franchise history. The team only lost one game in regulation on their way to a run all the way to the Grey Cup, making it the first team from Hamilton to reach the game since the Hamilton Tigers did so in 1935. They faced the Winnipeg RCAF Bombers, with the Wildcats having to wear gold and blue due to Winnipeg also wearing red and white. The Wildcats held on to an 18–7 lead by halftime on their way to a 23–14 victory in Toronto, the first Grey Cup champion for the city since 1932.

== Regular season ==
Ontario Rugby Football Union
Team	GP	W	L	T	PF	PA	Pts
Hamilton Flying Wildcats	10	8	1	1	223	71	17
Toronto Balmy Beach Beachers	10	8	2	0	148	74	16
Toronto RCAF Hurricanes	10	7	2	1	133	67	15
Ottawa Combines	9	2	7	0	68	129	4
Toronto HMCS York Bulldogs	10	2	8	0	73	160	4
Toronto Indians	9	1	8	0	36	180	2

== Playoffs ==
=== Grey Cup playoffs ===
Note: All dates in 1943

=== ORFU Final ===
Hamilton Flying Wildcats vs Toronto
Date	Away	Home
November 13	Hamilton Flying Wildcats 7	Toronto 2

=== Eastern Finals ===
Hamilton Flying Wildcats @ Lachine RCAF
Date	Away	Home
November 20	Hamilton Flying Wildcats 7	Lachine RCAF 6

== Grey Cup ==
Team	Q1	Q2	Q3	Q4	Total
Winnipeg RCAF Bombers	7	0	6	1	14
Hamilton Flying Wildcats	18	0	3	2	23

== Awards and honours ==
=== Ontario Rugby Football Union All-Stars ===
NOTE: During this time most players played both ways, so the All-Star selections do not distinguish between some offensive and defensive positions.

- HB – Joe Krol
- E – Jimmy Simpson
- G – Ed Remegis
