= John Taylor (Canadian football) =

Profile
- Position: End

Personal information
- Born: October 21, 1925; Montreal, Quebec, Canada
- Died: December 26, 2005 (aged 80); Smiths Falls, Ontario, Canada

Career information
- College: McGill University

Career history
- 1944: St. Hyacinthe-Donnacona Navy
- 1946, 1948–51: Montreal Alouettes

Awards and highlights
- 2× Grey Cup champion (1944, 1949)

John Miles Taylor (October 21, 1925 – December 26, 2005) was a Grey Cup champion Canadian Football League player. He played offensive end.

A native Montrealer, Taylor played football with Westhill High School, and later attended McGill University. He enlisted in the Navy during the Second World War. He first won the Grey Cup with the champion St. Hyacinthe-Donnacona Navy team, and scored that game's only touchdown. He was a player with the inaugural Montreal Alouettes in 1946 and was part of the Larks first Grey Cup championship. He played 38 games for the Als over 5 seasons.
