= Doug Maitland =

Canadian football player (1922–2006)

Profile
- Position: Halfback

Personal information
- Born: June 25, 1922; Laval, Quebec, Canada
- Died: August 28, 2006 (aged 84)

Career history
- 1945: Montreal Hornets
- 1946–49: Montreal Alouettes

Awards and highlights
- Grey Cup champion (1949)

Doug Maitland (June 25, 1922 – August 28, 2006) was a Grey Cup champion Canadian Football League player. He played halfback.

A native of suburban Montreal, Maitland began his pro career in 1945 with the Montreal Hornets and played with the inaugural Montreal Alouettes team in 1946. He was part of the Larks first Grey Cup championship. He played 38 games for the Als over 4 seasons.
