= Peter McPharland =

Canadian football player

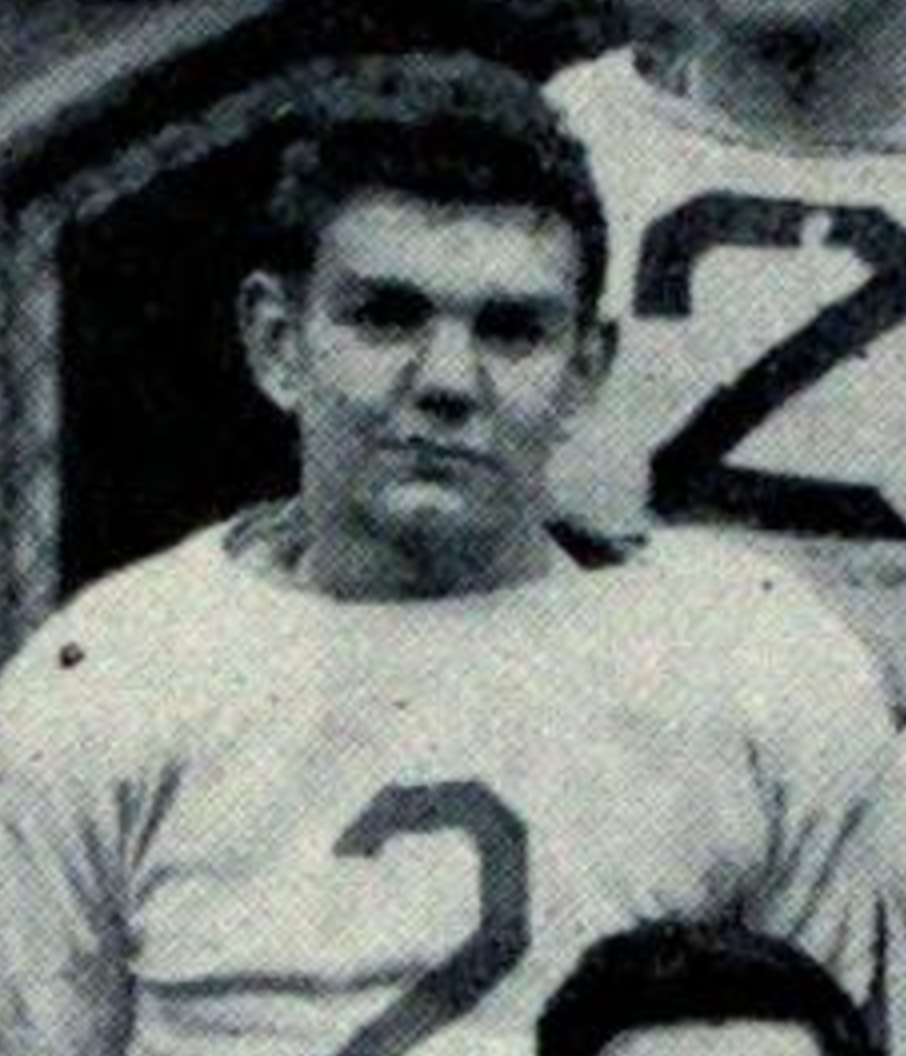
- McPharland c. 1944 at St. Michael's

Profile
- Position: Running back

Career information
- CJFL: St. Michael's College

Career history
- 1948: Toronto Argonauts
- 1949: Montreal Alouettes

Awards and highlights
- Grey Cup champion (1949)

Peter McPharland was a Grey Cup champion Canadian Football League player. He was a running back.

McPharland played his junior football with the powerhouse St. Michael's College team. He joined his hometown Toronto Argonauts in 1948, playing a game when Joe Krol and Royal Copeland were injured. In 1949 he was an integral part of the Montreal Alouettes first Grey Cup championship, playing 3 regular season games but getting "plenty of work" in the playoffs.
