= 1944 in Canadian football =

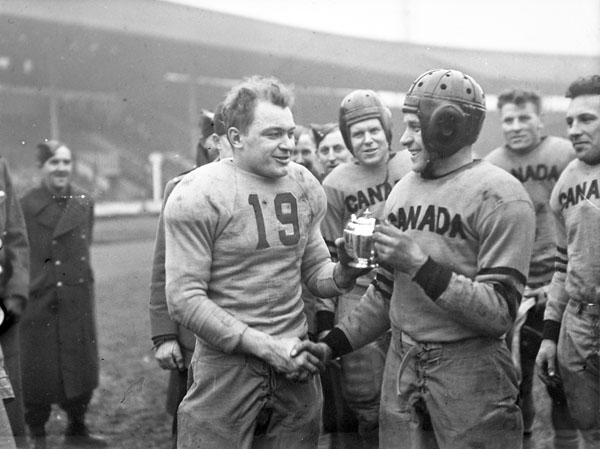
Canada-United States football game at White City Stadium, 1944

The Hamilton Flying Wildcats were trying to defend their championship, but the St. Hyacinthe-Donnacona Navy team finished off a Cinderella season by returning the Grey Cup back to Montreal for the first time since 1931.

== Canadian football news in 1944 ==
The WIFU and the IRFU suspended operations for the duration of World War II.

In late August, the Winnipeg Rugby Club (aka Blue Bombers) suspended operations for the 1944 season. The team loaned its equipment to local high schools.

The Regina Roughriders disbanded in early October. Unlike the previous season, the 1944 Roughriders did not have servicemen available to the team. Regular practices were conducted but the team gave up on the season when they failed to recruit enough civilian men to field a team.

== Regular season ==
=== Final regular season standings ===
Note: GP = Games played, W = Wins, L = Losses, T = Ties, PF = Points for, PA = Points against, Pts = Points

Western Interprovincial Football Union

- No league play

Interprovincial Rugby Football Union

- No league play

Ontario Armed Services Football League
Team	GP	W	L	T	PF	PA	Pts
**Hagersville RCAF Flying Tigers**	6	4	1	1	74	46	9
**Toronto HMCS York Bulldogs**	6	4	2	0	80	54	8
Camp Borden RCAF Hurricanes	6	3	2	1	94	57	7
St. Thomas Hornets	6	0	6	0	18	109	0

Ontario Rugby Football Union
Team	GP	W	L	T	PF	PA	Pts
**Hamilton Flying Wildcats**	6	5	1	0	102	28	10
**Toronto Balmy Beach Beachers**	6	4	2	0	105	33	8
Ottawa Trojans	6	3	3	0	74	74	6
Toronto Indians	6	0	6	0	19	168	0

Quebec Rugby Football Union
Team	GP	W	L	T	PF	PA	Pts
**St. Hyacinthe-Donnacona Navy**	4	3	1	0	58	18	6
McGill	4	2	2	0	29	53	4
Verdun	4	1	3	0	17	33	2

- Bold text means that they had clinched the playoffs.

Manitoba Inter-Services Rugby League
Team	GP	W	L	T	PF	PA	Pts
No.3 Wireless School Bombers (Winnipeg)	4	4	0	0	58	16	8
No.1 Central Navigation School Pathfinders (Rivers)	4	3	1	0	62	16	6
Army Grenades (Camp Shilo)	4	2	2	0	53	47	4
No.18 Service Flying Training School Hurricanes (Gimli)	4	1	3	0	36	66	2
No.3 Bombing & Gunnery Mustangs (MacDonald)	4	0	4	0	12	76	0

== Navy and Armed Services playoffs ==
OASFL Final
Toronto HMCS York Bulldogs vs. Hagersville RCAF Flying Tigers @ Toronto
Date	-	-
Nov. 11	Toronto HMCS York Bulldogs 20	Hagersville RCAF Flying Tigers 1

All Navy Semi-Final
St. Hyacinthe-Donnacona Navy vs. Halifax Navy Stadaconnas @ Montreal
Date	-	-
Nov. 11	Halifax Navy Stadaconnas 0	St. Hyacinthe-Donnacona Navy 13

All Navy Final
St. Hyacinthe-Donnacona Navy vs. Toronto HMCS York Bulldogs @ Montreal
Date	-	-
Nov. 18	Toronto HMCS York Bulldogs 12	St. Hyacinthe-Donnacona Navy 1

- The Navy playoffs did not affect the Grey Cup playoffs. The Grey Cup was played between the ORFU winners (Hamilton) and the QRFU winners (St. Hyacinthe-Donnacona Navy) despite the Toronto Navy team beating the QRFU champions. The OSFL did not participate in the Grey Cup playoffs.

== Manitoba Inter-Services Rugby League ==
MISRL Semi-Final
Rivers Pathfinders vs. Army Grenades @ Winnipeg
Date	Away	Home
October 25	No.1 CNS Rivers Pathfinders 15	Army Grenades 5

MISRL Finals – Game 1
Rivers Pathfinders vs. Winnipeg Bombers @ Winnipeg
Date	Away	Home
October 28	No.1 CNS Rivers Pathfinders 7	No.3 Wireless School Bombers 11

MISRL Finals – Game 2
Rivers Pathfinders vs. Winnipeg Bombers @ Winnipeg
Date	Away	Home
November 11	No.1 CNS Rivers Pathfinders 5	No.3 Wirelss School Bombers 15

- Bombers won the total-point series by 26-12. The MISRL did not compete for the Grey Cup.

== Ontario Rugby Football League playoffs ==
ORFU Final
Toronto Balmy Beach Beachers @ Hamilton Flying Wildcats
Date	Away	Home
Nov. 11	Hamilton Flying Wildcats 13	Toronto Balmy Beach Beachers 4

ORFU Final
Hamilton Flying Wildcats @ Toronto Balmy Beach Beachers
Date	Away	Home
Nov. 18	Toronto Balmy Beach Beachers 6	Hamilton Flying Wildcats 0

- Hamilton would play the St. Hyacinthe-Donnacona Navy in the Grey Cup.

== Grey Cup Championship ==
November 25 32nd Annual Grey Cup Game: A.A.A. Grounds - Hamilton, Ontario
St. Hyacinthe-Donnacona Navy 7	Hamilton Flying Wildcats 6
St. Hyacinthe-Donnacona Navy were the 1944 Grey Cup Champions.

== 1944 Ontario Armed Services Football League All-Stars ==
NOTE: During this time most players played both ways, so the All-Star selections do not distinguish between some offensive and defensive positions.

- QB – LS Annis Stukus, Toronto Navy Bulldogs
- HB – LS Tom Waldon, Toronto Navy Bulldogs
- HB – LAC Ray Mullins, St. Thomas Hornets
- DB – LAC Doug Smylie, Hagersville RCAF Flying Tigers
- E – Sgt. Dick Groom, Hagersville RCAF Flying Tigers
- E – LS Al Upper, Toronto Navy Bulldogs
- FW – Sgt. Doug Pyzer, Camp Borden RCAF Hurricanes
- C – F/O Jake Gaudaur, Camp Borden RCAF Hurricanes
- G – LS Hank McMahon, Toronto Navy Bulldogs
- G – Cpl. Fred Lamoureaux, Hagersville RCAF Flying Tigers
- T – Flt. Lt. Mike Ozarko, Camp Borden RCAF Hurricanes
- T – F/O Al Langford, Hagersville RCAF Flying Tigers

== 1944 Canadian Football Awards ==
- Jeff Russel Memorial Trophy (IRFU MVP) – no award given due to World War II
- Imperial Oil Trophy (ORFU MVP) - Joe Krol - Hamilton Wildcats
