= Ralph Cooper (disambiguation) =

Ralph Cooper (1908–1992) was an American actor, originator and master of ceremonies of Amateur Night at the Apollo Theater in Harlem.

Ralph Cooper may also refer to:

- Ralph W. Cooper (1908–1994), inducted in the Canadian Football Hall of Fame as a builder
- Ralph Cooper, former backing drummer of Air Supply, an Australian soft rock duo
- Ralph Cooper (1924–?), one of the Trenton Six, convicted of murder
- Ralph Cooper, commander of the 11th Airborne Division from May to June 1958
