= Steve Levantis =

Canadian gridiron football player (1916–1993)

No. 51
- Position: Guard

Personal information
- Born: July 28, 1916; Montreal, Quebec, Canada
- Died: February 27, 1993 (aged 76); Ancaster, Ontario, Canada
- Listed height: 6 ft 0 in (1.83 m)
- Listed weight: 215 lb (98 kg)

Career information
- College: Boston College

Career history
- 1945–1949: Toronto Argonauts
- 1950: Hamilton Tiger-Cats

Awards and highlights
- 3× Grey Cup champion (1945, 1946, 1947)

Steve Levantis (July 28, 1916 – February 27, 1993) was a Canadian professional football player who played for the Toronto Argonauts and Hamilton Tiger-Cats. He won the Grey Cup with the Argonauts in 1945, 1946 and 1947. During World War II, Levantis enlisted and won a Grey Cup with the St. Hyacinthe–Donnacona Navy in 1944. His brother John Levantis also played professional football.
