= Samuel Abbott =

Samuel Abbott or Sam Abbott may refer to:

- Samuel Warren Abbott (1837–1904), American physician
- Samuel Abbott (watchman) (1833–1911), sole casualty of the 1911 New York State Capitol fire
- Sam Abbott (Canadian football) (born c. 1921), Canadian football player
- Samuel Abbott (engineer) (1842–1890), British railway engineer
- Sammie Abbott (1908–1990), former mayor of Takoma Park, Maryland
