= John Crncich =

Yugoslav-born Canadian football player (1925–2019)

Profile
- Position: Center

Personal information
- Born: February 8, 1925; Krk, Yugoslavia
- Died: October 27, 2019 (aged 94); Toronto, Ontario, Canada

Career information
- College: McGill University

Career history
- 1944: St. Hyacinthe-Donnacona Navy
- 1945: Montreal Hornets
- 1946: Toronto Argonauts
- 1949–50: Sarnia Imperials

Awards and highlights
- Grey Cup champion (1944)

John George Crncich (February 8, 1925 – October 27, 2019) was a Grey Cup champion Canadian Football League player. He played offensive center.

A native Croatian, Crncich played football with Thomas D'Arcy McGee High School, and later attended McGill University, both in Montreal. He won the Grey Cup with the champion St. Hyacinthe-Donnacona Navy team in 1944. He was a player with the Montreal Hornets and in 1946 played one game with the Toronto Argonauts. He finished his football career playing 2 seasons for the Sarnia Imperials. He died on October 27, 2019.
