= Crnčić =

Crnčić is a surname. Notable people with the surname include:

- John Crncich (1925–2019), Canadian American football player
- Leon Črnčič (born 1990), Slovenian footballer
- Menci Clement Crnčić (1865–1930), Croatian painter
