= Stan Rose =

Canadian football player

Profile
- Positions: Quarterback, Halfback

Personal information
- Born: 1924
- Died: October 18, 2000 (aged 76); Saint-Eustache, Quebec, Canada

Career history
- 1945: Montreal Hornets
- 1947: Saskatchewan Roughriders

Stanley Rose (1924 – October 18, 2000) was a Canadian football player who played for the Montreal Hornets and Saskatchewan Roughriders. He played junior football in Montreal.

Rose was a longtime employee of Canadair. He died in 2000, aged 76.
