= Moe Segal =

Profile
- Positions: G, T

Personal information
- Born: February 2, 1925; Quyon, Quebec, Canada
- Died: July 6, 2016 (aged 91)

Career information
- College: none - Ottawa Technical High School

Career history
- 1944: St. Hyacinthe-Donnacona Navy
- 1946: Ottawa Rough Riders
- 1947: Ottawa Trojans

Awards and highlights
- Grey Cup champion (1944)

Moe Segal (February 2, 1925 – July 6, 2016) was a Grey Cup champion Canadian Football League player. He played offensive guard and tackle.

A native Québécois, Segal played football with Ottawa Technical High School. He won the Grey Cup with the champion St. Hyacinthe-Donnacona Navy team in 1944 (unfortunately Segal was injured just before the championship game and did not get to play.) He played with the Ottawa Rough Riders in 1946 and the Ottawa Trojans in 1947.
