= Ralph W. Cooper =

Ralph William Cooper (1908 – 1994) was a Canadian football and construction industry executive who was the first president of the Hamilton Tiger-Cats as well as president of the Interprovincial Rugby Football Union and the Canadian Football League.

== Early life ==
Cooper was born on November 3, 1908 in Hamilton, Ontario to William Henry and Edith Elizabeth Cooper. On June 18, 1938, he married Evelyn Joanne McArthur. They had one son and two daughters.

== Construction ==
Cooper took over his father's company, Cooper Construction Company, in the 1940s. The company worked on a number of large projects in and around Hamilton, Ontario, including installations for Procter & Gamble, McMaster University, the American Can Company, Dominion Glass, International Harvester, Bell Telephone of Canada, Canadian Industries Limited, Chicago Rawhide, Canadian Canners, Dominion Electrohome Industries, F. W. Fearman Co., and the University of Waterloo. Cooper Construction built the Canadian Football Hall of Fame at cost. Cooper was also a director of the Canadian Imperial Bank of Commerce, Hamilton General Hospital, the Mutual Life Assurance Company of Canada, Dominion Tar & Chemical, Dominion Glass, Slater Steel Industries, the Canada Trust Company, and the Hamilton Street Railway. He retired in 1975 and was succeeded by his son, Bill Cooper.

== Canadian football ==
Cooper was a driving force behind the merger of the Hamilton Tigers and the Hamilton Wildcats and was the first president of the Hamilton Tiger-Cats. He served as president of Interprovincial Rugby Football Union in 1955. In 1956, Cooper was elected chairman of the Canadian Football Council, a newly formed organization created by the IPRFU and the Western Interprovincial Rugby Football Union clubs to oversee professional football in Canada. On February 15, 1956, Cooper and National Football League commissioner Bert Bell reached an agreement for both sides to recognize each other's contracts, which ended years of "raids" between the NFL and Canadian teams. Cooper was president of the Canadian Football League during the 1960 season and, along with Frank M. Gibson and Ralph Parliament, devised an interlocking schedule for 1961 which saw teams from the East and West divisions play each other in the regular season for the first time. He remained on the Tiger-Cats board of directors until 1973, when he was succeeded by his son, Bill. From 1973 to 1977, he was a member of the club’s board of governors. In 1992, Cooper was inducted into the Canadian Football Hall of Fame. He died in September 1994 at the age of 85.
