= John Levantis =

Canadian football player

Profile
- Position: Guard

Personal information
- Born: May 26, 1925; Montreal, Quebec, Canada
- Died: August 14, 2010 (aged 85); Toronto, Ontario, Canada
- Listed weight: 235 lb (107 kg)

Career history
- 1946–1948: Toronto Argonauts

Awards and highlights
- 2× Grey Cup champion (1946, 1947)

John Levantis (May 26, 1925 – August 14, 2010) was a Canadian professional football player who played for the Toronto Argonauts. He won the Grey Cup with them in 1946 and 1947. He was later a firefighter. His brother Steve Levantis also played professional football.

Levantis was born in Montreal, Quebec and moved to Toronto at an early age. After graduating, Levantis became a firefighter. In those days, professional players did not earn much for playing football and a full-time job was essential. According to John, you were happy to get a windbreaker at the end of the season. Levantis died in 2010.
