= Kyle Joedicke =

Haudenosaunee artist

Kyle Joedicke is a Haudenosaunee artist based in Hamilton, Ontario whose Woodlands style murals appear in cities across Ontario including Hamilton, Waterloo, and Huntsville.

Joedicke is of Scottish and Cayuga descent, and a member of the Turtle Clan. He grew up in Caledonia, Ontario and is a "lifelong self-described doodler". A self-taught artist, his mural work evolved from practicing graffiti.

Joedicke began pursuing art professionally after being laid off during the COVID-19 pandemic. Since completing his first mural in 2021, Joedicke's work has expanded to include the redesigning team logos, including one for the Hamilton Tiger Cats unveiled in 2023. In 2025 a new Waterloo Warriors logo designed by Joedicke was launched. His mural "The Great Law of Peace" was unveiled at the University of Waterloo the year prior.
