= John Salavantis =

American gridiron football player and coach

Biographical details
- Born: North Adams, Massachusetts, U.S.

Playing career
- 1962–1965: Ottawa (KS)
- Position: Offensive tackle

Coaching career (HC unless noted)
- 1971: Pratt (offense)
- 1972: Pratt
- 1974: McPherson (OC)
- 1975–1977: Independence
- 1978: Ottawa (KS)
- 1980–1982: Missouri Southern (assistant)
- 1983–1984: Garden City (assistant)
- 1985–1990: Hamilton Tiger-Cats (assistant)
- 1991: Montreal Machine (OL)
- 1993: Ottawa Rough Riders (WR)
- 1994–1997: Hamilton Tiger-Cats (OL)
- 2006: Hamilton Tiger-Cats (OL)

Head coaching record
- Overall: 7–3 (college)

Accomplishments and honors

Awards
- First-team All-KCAC (1965)

John Salavantis is an American former gridiron football coach. He served as football coach at Ottawa University in Ottawa, Kansas one season, in 1978, compiling a record of 7–3. Salavantis later workred as an assistant coach in the Canadian Football League (CFL) with the Hamilton Tiger-Cats and the Ottawa Rough Riders. Salavantis was also the radio colour analyst on AM 900 CHML for the Hamilton Tiger-Cats.

Salavantis graduated from Drury High School in North Adams, Massachusetts, before attending Ottawa, where he played football for four years as an offensive tackle.

== Head coaching record ==
=== College ===
Year	Team	Overall	Conference	Standing	Bowl/playoffs
Ottawa Braves (Heart of America Athletic Conference) (1978)
1978	Ottawa	7–3	4–2	T–2nd	
Ottawa:		7–3	4–2		
Total:		7–3			
