= Roy Ananny =

Canadian football player (1927–2011)

- Roy Ananny

Profile
- Positions: Halfback, FW, End

Personal information
- Born: October 11, 1924
- Died: April 12, 2011 (aged 86)

Career information
- High school: Ottawa Technical HS

Career history
- 1945–1947: Ottawa Rough Riders

Roy "Bobby" Fredrick Ananny (October 11, 1924 – April 12, 2011) was a professional Canadian football halfback, flying wing, and end who played for the Ottawa Rough Riders of the Interprovincial Rugby Football Union. From 1945 to 1947, he played in 12 regular season games. Later in life, Ananny was a realtor.

== Early life ==
Ananny was born on October 11, 1924. He attended Ottawa Technical High School (often shortened to Tech) from 1940 to 1943, where he participated in several athletic teams. Starting in 1940, Ananny played both hockey and football at Tech. On the football team, Ananny was a halfback. Ottawa Technical's hockey team became Junior Interscholastic Champions while Ananny was a member of the team in 1941. He also was a member of Ottawa Technical School's basketball team in 1943, when they won the Ottawa Interscholastic Senior Basketball League.

== Canadian football career ==
From 1945 to 1947, Ananny played for the Ottawa Rough Riders of the Interprovincial Rugby Football Union. With the Rough Riders, he played two games in 1945, seven games in 1946, and three games in 1947. During this period of time, the IRFU did not track the statistics of players, so the extent of his contribution is unknown.

== Later life ==
At various points in his life, Ananny held positions as a temporary fireman, police constable, and realtor. Realty was Ananny's lifelong career. Later in life, he curled at the Ottawa Curling Club. He was also active as a hockey, basketball, and golf player. He married and had two children as well as five grandchildren.

Ananny died on April 12, 2011, at the age of 86.
