= Bob Cunningham (Canadian football) =

Canadian football player (1927–2006)

Profile
- Position: Running back

Personal information
- Born: September 26, 1927; Port Credit, Ontario, U.S.
- Died: October 8, 2006 (aged 79); Scarborough, Ontario, U.S.

Career information
- High school: Port Credit High School
- College: none

Career history
- 1946–1947: Toronto Balmy Beach Beachers
- 1948–1951: Montreal Alouettes
- 1952–1955: Ottawa Rough Riders

Awards and highlights
- Grey Cup champion (1949); Jeff Russel Memorial Trophy (1953); CFL All-Star (1947)

Bob Cunningham (September 26, 1927 – October 8, 2006) was a Grey Cup champion and award-winning professional Canadian football fullback.

== Career ==
Between 1948 and 1951, he played 29 games for the Montreal Alouettes, scoring one touchdown in the 37th Grey Cup He played for the Ottawa Rough Riders from 1952 to 1955, winning the Jeff Russel Memorial Trophy in 1953 (as Eastern MVP). In 1947 he was an all-star with the Toronto Balmy Beach Beachers.
