= James Strutt =

Canadian architect

- Born: James William Strutt; 8 January 1924; Pembroke, Ontario
- Died: 8 November 2008 (age 84); Ottawa, Ontario
- Education: University of Toronto (1950)
- Occupation: Architect
- Spouse: Audrey Elizabeth Lett (m. 1949; died 2004)
- Practice: Gilleland and Strutt

James William Strutt (8 January 1924 – 8 November 2008) was a Canadian architect. Practising between 1950 and 1999 and working primarily in the Ottawa area, Strutt is noted for his role in the development of modern architecture in Canada following World War II.

== Biography ==
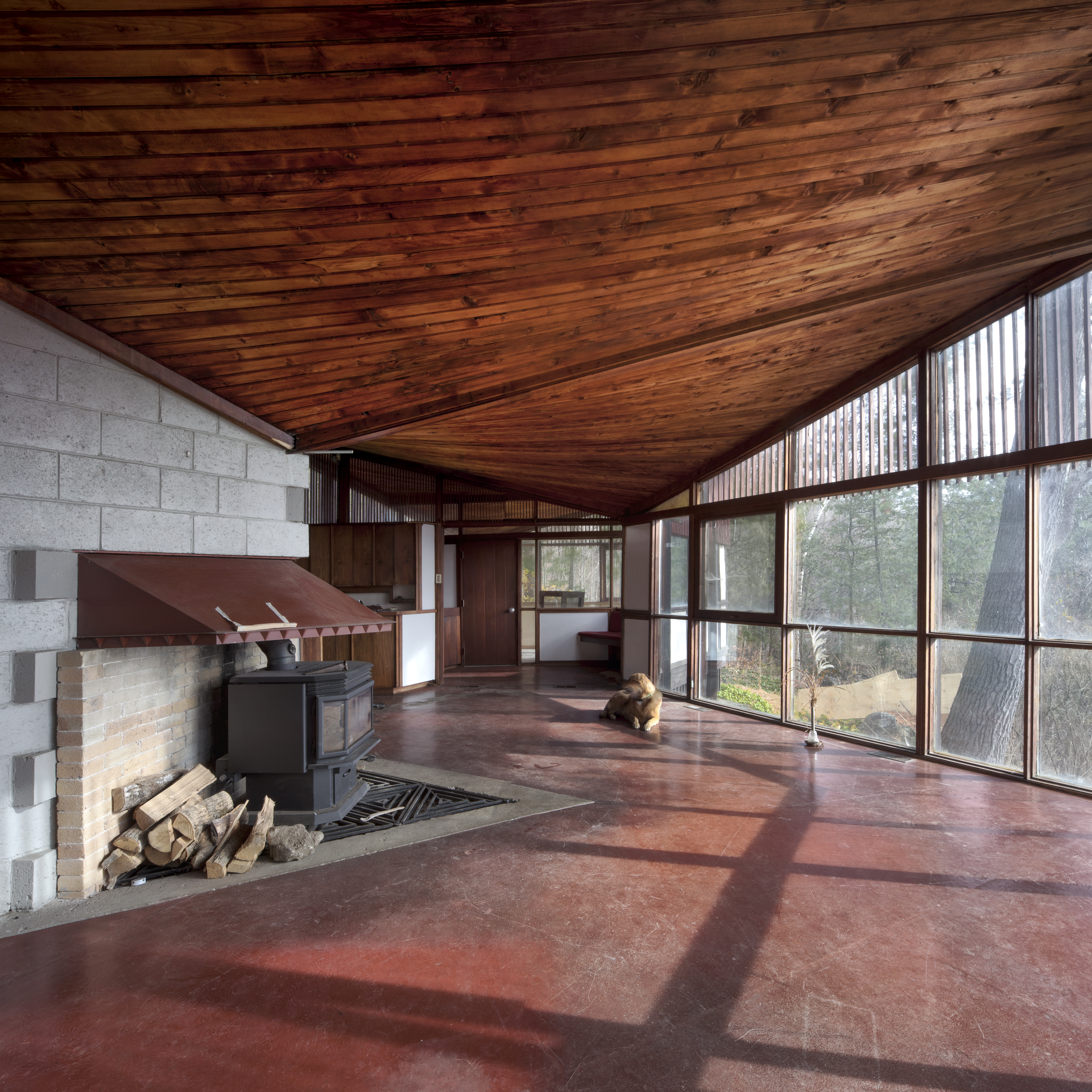
Strutt House in Gatineau

James William Strutt was born in Pembroke, Ontario, and grew up in Ottawa in the Glebe neighbourhood. He had one sister, Esther. After graduating from Ottawa Technical High School in 1942, he enlisted into the Royal Canadian Air Force, becoming a pilot. During the War Strutt served on Canada's east coast as part of RAF Coastal Command.

Following the War, through the Veterans Charter, Strutt enrolled at the University of Toronto to study mechanical engineering. After a single semester he transferred to architecture. During his time at the U of T he met both Buckminster Fuller and Frank Lloyd Wright. On 21 May 1949 at the Bishop Strachan School chapel, Strutt married Audrey Elizabeth Lett of Toronto (d. 2004), who was also attending the University of Toronto. The couple later had four children: Lesley, David, Katherine, and Jocelyn. James and Audrey both graduated in 1950.

Following his graduation, Strutt returned to Ottawa where he got a job with the firm Lefort and Gilleland. A year later, Strutt and William Gilleland broke off to form their own partnership, Strutt and Gilleland, which lasted until 1960. Throughout the 1950s the firm worked primarily on residential projects. Notable among them was Strutt's own 1956 house in Gatineau, which employed a hyperbolic paraboloid roof. At the house, the Strutts regularly threw parties which included prominent guests such as Pierre Trudeau. After falling into abeyance in the years following Strutt's death, in 2010 the National Capital Commission purchased the house and is in the process of restoring it to original condition. During the same period, Strutt and Gilleland also received two commissions as part of the Department of Transportation's post-war airport construction programme. The firm designed the Ottawa, Sept-Iles and Halifax terminals, which were done in the international style.

In 1960, with Inigo Adamson, Strutt formed the partnership Strutt and Adamson, which lasted until 1966. That year, Strutt formed a personal practice, J.W. Strutt, Architect, at which he would remain for the duration of his career.

With the Ontario Association of Architects Strutt served as the chairman of the Ottawa chapter (1955-1956), vice president (1958-1959), and president (1959-1960). With the Royal Architectural Institute of Canada he served as honorary treasurer (1963-1964), honorary secretary (1965-1966), and vice-president (1966-1967). Between 1969 and 1986 he taught at the department of architecture at Carleton University, serving as the department director from 1987 to 1988.

Following his death in 2008, a group of individuals began the Strutt Foundation. The foundation - a non-for-profit which was incorporated in 2013 - seeks to support projects relating to modern architecture in Canada. The foundation also has an archive which includes some papers of Strutt's, papers from Strutt's clients, and papers of various other Canadian modernist architects.

Strutt's records and held at Library and Archives Canada as the James W. Strutt fonds.

== Works (a limited selection) ==
Name	City	Address	Year	Status
Shaefer House	Ottawa	Montreal Road	1949	
Palmer House	Ottawa	824 Maple Crest Road	1950	
Dowbiggin House	Senneville		1952	
Dawson House	Senneville		1953	
Geophysical Lab	Ottawa	Experimental Farm	1953	
Burke House	Ottawa	Revelstoke Drive	1954	
Shore House	Gatineau (Aylmer)	1204 Mountain Road	1954	
Waring House	Aylmer	1124 Mountain Road	1954	
Seven Islands Airport	Sept-Îles		1954	Transport Canada
St. Mark's Anglican Church	Ottawa	1606 Fisher Avenue	1954	
St. Peter's Anglican Church	Ottawa	915 Merivale Road	1955	
Gibson House	Ottawa	Cunningham Avenue	1955	
Halifax Civic Airport Terminal	Enfield		1956	
Southam Ski Lodge	Kingsmere, Gatineau Park		1956	
Hall House	Ottawa	Dorothea Drive	1956	
Strutt House	Aylmer	1220 Mountain Road	1956	Owned by National Capital Commission
Neatby Building	Ottawa	Experimental Farm	1957	
Uplands Airport Terminal	Ottawa		1958	Demolished
St. Paul's Presbyterian Church	Ottawa	971 Woodroffe Avenue	1958	
Dobell Chalet	Edna Lake		1958	
Weiner House	Ottawa	418 Roger Road	1958	
Loeb House	Ottawa	225 Minto Place	1958	
Geldhart round House [sic Geldart]	Aylmer	170 Edgewood Drive	1959	Demolished
SolenHus round house	Aylmer	Chestnut	1959	
Zarzycki round House	Aylmer		1959	
Baldock House	Aylmer	1224 Mountain Road	1959	
Van Leeuwen see SolenHus	Aylmer	Chestnut	1959	
Rothwell United Church	Ottawa	42 Sumac Street	1960	
Trinity United Church	Ottawa	1099 Maitland Avenue	1960	
Morley House	Aylmer	190 Edgewood Drive	1960	
Anderson House	Aylmer	241 Skyridge Road	1960	Demolished
Quain Chalet	Mont Cascades		1961	
Hanlan House	Aylmer	145 Chestnut Street	1962	
Royal Trust Building	Ottawa	55 Metcalfe Street	1962	
Fischer House	Ottawa	339 Pleasant Park Road	1962	Designated Heritage Property
Stopforth House	Chelsea	Mine Road	1962	
Kemper House	Ottawa	11 Briarcliffe Drive	1962	Part of Briarcliffe Heritage Conservation District
St. Paul's Anglican Church	Ottawa	194 Prince Albert Street	1963	
Camp Fortune Ski Lodge	Gatineau		1963	
Merrit House	Deep River	54 Laurier Avenue	1963	
Northern Electric Advanced Devises Centre	Ottawa	Moody Drive	1963	
Loeb Building, Carleton University	Ottawa	Carleton University	1964	
Plaza de las Américas (Expo '67)	Montreal		1967	
National Capital Commission	Ottawa	Western Parkway	1965	
Bells Corners United Church	Ottawa	3955 Old Richmond Road	1965	
Westboro Beach Pavilions	Ottawa	Kitchisippi Lookout	1966	
Canadian Nurses Association Headquarters	Ottawa	50 Queen Elizabeth Drive	1967	
Borman House	Ottawa	20 Qualicum Street	1968	
Gatineau River Yacht Club	Chelsea	1 chemin Summerlea	1976	
Rochester House	Almonte	Concession Rd. 7	1976	
Meredith House	Aylmer	1203 Mountain Road	1987	
Lambert House	Aylmer	1211 Mountain Road	1994	
Canadian Embassy	Algiers		1998	
