= Marshall Ferguson =

Sports broadcaster and former Canadian football quarterback

Profile
- Position: Quarterback

Personal information
- Born: June 15, 1991 (age 35)
- Listed height: 6 ft 2 in (1.88 m)
- Listed weight: 190 lb (86 kg)

Career information
- High school: Frontenac Secondary
- University: McMaster
- CFL draft: 2014: undrafted

Awards and highlights
- Vanier Cup champion (2014); 3× Yates Cup champion (2011, 2012, 2014)

Marshall Ferguson (born June 15, 1991) is a Canadian radio and television personality, sports broadcaster and former Canadian football quarterback. Ferguson is currently a host and play-by-play announcer for The Sports Network (TSN) in Hamilton, Ontario.

== Football career ==
Ferguson was recruited as a quarterback from a variety of OUA schools following his senior year at Frontenac Secondary School in Kingston, Ontario. After committing to McMaster University and the Marauders, he sat for three years behind 2012 Hec Crighton Trophy winner and incumbent starting quarterback, Kyle Quinlan. However, in 2011, when Quinlan served a three-game suspension following an on campus incident, Ferguson became the temporary starting quarterback. As a 2nd year, Ferguson and the Marauders won all three games after defeating the Windsor Lancers, the Guelph Gryphons, and finally the Waterloo Warriors in McMaster's 2011 homecoming game.

As a starter in 2013, Ferguson set the McMaster school record for pass attempts in a season (314) pass completions in a season (199) and passing touchdowns in a season (21). That season McMaster would lose 32–3 against the Western Mustangs in the OUA semifinals. In his last season at McMaster, in 2014, Ferguson helped the Marauders to a 7–1 regular season record before winning the Yates Cup, Mitchell Bowl, and nearly winning the Vanier Cup.

Ferguson finished his career at McMaster placing in the school record books second in career pass attempts (765), second in career pass completions (493), first in career completion percentage (64.4%), and third in career passing touchdowns (49). Ferguson joins McMaster teammates Ben O'Connor and Steven Ventresca as the only Marauders to play in 57 games for the school due to their Vanier Cup runs in 2011, 2012, and 2014.

== Broadcasting career ==
Prior to his work with TSN, Ferguson worked as sports director of CFMU 93.3 McMaster University radio. There, Ferguson created "OUA Today", a weekly podcast covering Ontario University Athletics. He also broadcast McMaster University men's and women's basketball while completing his career as the Marauders starting quarterback on the football team.

In September 2015, Ferguson was announced as the TSN 1150 Hamilton afternoon drive co-host with Hamilton Spectator columnist, Steve Milton. The show aptly named "Marsh and Milton" was the first of its kind for TSN 1150 Hamilton's local programming. During that first year on the air, Ferguson also served as the play-by-play voice of the McMaster Marauders on TSN 1150 as well as hosting the Hamilton Tiger-Cats pregame and postgame shows while reporting from the sideline in game. On May 16, 2016, Ferguson was promoted to lead play-by-play commentator for the Tiger-Cats.

One year after TSN 1150 Hamilton launched, Steve Milton left the show and Ferguson teamed up with Hamilton native and well known broadcaster Jim Tatti to form 'Tatti and Marsh' airing weekdays 3-7 pm before making the move to mornings with Hamilton's Kyle Melo to form "Marsh and Melo" heard weekdays 6-9 am on TSN 1150 Hamilton. Ferguson was not retained when the Tiger-Cats reclaimed their radio rights in 2021.

Ferguson has also contributed to the Canadian Football League's website on various platforms including his role as lead analyst on both the CFL playoffs and the CFL draft. In 2021, he joined TSN as a play-by-play announcer and called several games throughout the 2021 season.
