= Ottawa Technical High School =

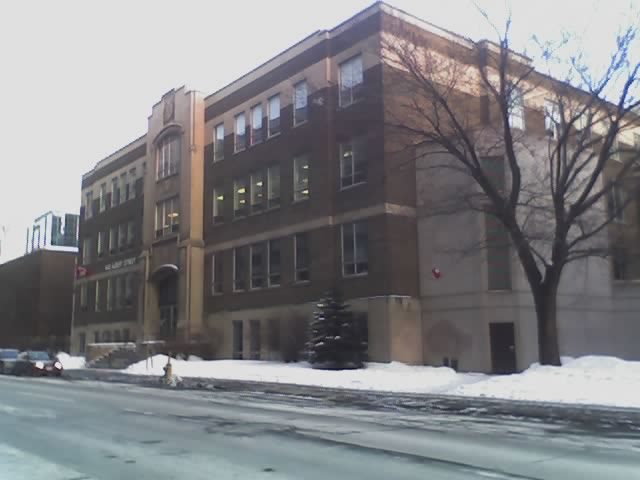

Location
- Albert Street; Ottawa, Ontario; Canada; 45.4168°N 75.7063°W

Information
- Founded: 1913
- Closed: 1992
- School board: Ottawa Carleton District School Board
- Grades: 9-13
- Language: English, French
- Campus: Urban

Ottawa Technical High School, also known as Ottawa Tech, was a vocational high school in the Centretown neighbourhood of Ottawa, Ontario, Canada. The school opened in 1913 as the second public secondary school in Ottawa and closed in 1992. The building is now known as the Albert Street Education Centre.

== History ==
The building was previously home to a women's college, and Ottawa Tech moved into the space in 1916. The school originally offered both standard high school programs and courses in auto mechanics, electricity, drafting, computers, and graphic arts. The original building was expanded in the 1960s and a new structure connected by a walkway was built across Slater Street.

The school expanded its range of courses in the 1950s and 1960s. At its peak in this era, Ottawa Tech had around 1,600 students. The school dropped the compulsory study of Latin and offered pre-engineering courses combining high-level academic courses with technical courses such as electronics and machine shops, as well as the option for intensive music studies.

In the 1970s, Ottawa saw a decentralization of education which drew students to the newer suburban schools. Ottawa Tech, along with several other schools in the city centre, began to drop in enrollment. During this time, the school's academic performance diminished, with only 10% of students continuing to university upon graduation. Due to the expansion of immigration into Ottawa, some 30% of the students enrolling at Ottawa Tech were studying English as a second language. The surrounding area experienced linguistic and racial divisions within its population, which further reduced enrollment. The school was heavily renovated in the early 1980s. In 1984, the High School of Commerce's business programs were transferred to Ottawa Tech. However, these changes did not reverse declining student numbers. Enrollment fell to 450 in 1990. The Ottawa Board of Education decided to close the school in May 1992.

The five-acre (20,000 m^{2}) campus now houses many different tenants offering training and high school programs. The TFO series Science Point Com was filmed in the building's classrooms. Despite pressure to sell the buildings, which were valued at over $10 million in 1999, the site is still owned by the Ottawa-Carleton District School Board. In 2009, the site was considered to be repurposed as a new downtown branch of the Ottawa Public Library.

== Notable alumni ==
- Roy Ananny (football player)
- Gene Robillard (football player)
- Moe Segal (football player)
- James Strutt (architect)
