= Vince Scott =

American gridiron football player (1925–1992)

No. 53
- Position: Defensive tackle

Personal information
- Born: July 10, 1925; Le Roy, New York, U.S.
- Died: July 13, 1992 (aged 67)
- Listed height: 5 ft 8 in (1.73 m)
- Listed weight: 215 lb (98 kg)

Career information
- College: Notre Dame

Career history
- 1947–1948: Buffalo Bills
- 1949: Hamilton Wildcats
- 1950–1962: Hamilton Tiger-Cats

Awards and highlights
- 2× Grey Cup champion (1953, 1957); 10× CFL East All-Star (1949, 1950, 1952–1959); National champion (1946)
- Stats at Pro Football Reference
- Canadian Football Hall of Fame (Class of 1982)

Vincent Joseph "Boomer" Scott (July 10, 1925 – July 13, 1992) was a Canadian football player. He played for the Hamilton Tiger-Cats, and was later a Hamilton city councillor. He became a Canadian citizen in the mid-1950s

Scott was born in Le Roy, New York. He suffered from polio as a child and was left with a slightly shrunken left leg, although this did not inhibit his sports career. He made the University of Notre Dame team as a lineman, and played for two seasons with the Buffalo Bills of the AAFC before joining the Hamilton Wildcats franchise in 1949. The Wildcats merged with the Hamilton Tigers in 1950 to create the Hamilton Tiger-Cats, and Scott played for the merged team until his retirement in 1962. He made six Grey Cup appearances, and helped the Tiger-Cats win the cup in 1953 and 1957.

He worked at Stelco after his retirement, and later entered the real estate business. He hosted a talk show in the 1970s and 1980s, and was named to the Canadian Football Hall of Fame in 1982. He was elected to Hamilton City Council for the city's fourth ward in the 1982 municipal election, and subsequently participated in discussions with Tiger-Cats owner Harold Ballard to ensure that the team remained in Hamilton. Fellow councillor Mike Davison described him as a conservative.

Scott was defeated in his bid for re-election in 1985. He suffered a stroke the following year, and never fully recovered. He died in 1992 following a lengthy illness.

In 2007, he was inducted into the New York State Public High School Athletic Association Section V Football Hall of Fame.
