= Chester McCance =

Canadian football player

Profile
- Positions: Wide receiver, placekicker

Personal information
- Born: February 19, 1915; Winnipeg, Manitoba, Canada
- Died: May 8, 1956 (aged 41); Winnipeg, Manitoba, Canada

Career history
- 1935: Winnipeg Victorias
- 1937–1941: Winnipeg Blue Bombers
- 1942–1943: Winnipeg RCAF Bombers
- 1945: Winnipeg Blue Bombers
- 1946–1950: Montreal Alouettes

Awards and highlights
- 3× Grey Cup champion (1939, 1941, 1949); 2× CFL West All-Star (1940, 1941); Manitoba Sports Hall of Fame (2004)
- Canadian Football Hall of Fame (Class of 1976)

Chester McCance
Medal record

Men's Curling

Representing Quebec

Macdonald Brier
Silver medal – second place	1953 Sudbury	

Chester "Ches" McCance (February 19, 1915 – May 8, 1956), was a Canadian football wide receiver and placekicker who played thirteen seasons in professional football, mainly for the Winnipeg Blue Bombers. In 1976 he was inducted into the Canadian Football Hall of Fame and in 2004 he was inducted into the Manitoba Sports Hall of Fame and Museum.

McCance also curled, and represented Quebec at the 1952 and 1953 Macdonald Briers.
