= St. Hyacinthe–Donnacona Navy =

Canadian football team during World War II

General information
- Founded: 1943; 83 years ago
- Stadium: Percival Molson Memorial Stadium
- Headquartered: Montreal, Quebec, Canada
- Colours: Navy Blue, White
- Mascot: K. Clarke

Personnel
- General manager: Fred Porter
- Head coach: Glen Brown

Nickname
- The Donnies

League / conference affiliations
- Quebec Rugby Football Union

Championships
- Grey Cup win: 0; 1944

St. Hyacinthe–Donnacona Navy was an amateur Canadian football team during the Second World War. They won the Grey Cup in 1944. The team was named after the communications training school HMCS St. Hyacinthe and the naval reserve division HMCS Donnacona.

== Game ==
Both the Western Interprovincial Football Union and the Interprovincial Rugby Football Union had no 1944 regular season due to the Second World War. Lower-ranked leagues did participate for the playoffs. St. Hyacinthe–Donnacona Navy was part of the Quebec Rugby Football Union. On 25 November 1944 the St. Hyacinthe–Donnacona Navy defeated the Hamilton Wildcats 7–6 at the Civic Stadium, in Hamilton, Ontario, to win the 32nd Grey Cup.

=== Roster ===
St. Hyacinthe–Donnacona Navy defeated the Hamilton Wildcats at the 32nd Grey Cup.

Championship roster (bold denotes the player played in the Grey Cup game):

Charlie Ellis, Wally Charron, Curly Hiltz, Ginger O’Brien, Bucko McLeod, Glen Brown (Coach), Roy Kirbyson, John Taylor, John Crncich, Steve Levantis, Jack Wedley, Al Hurley, Wally Patch, Malcolm Baker, Hal Chard, Tom Bainbridge, Ian Barclay, Sam Abbott, Whitey Leonard, Dick Swarbrick, Pat Santucci, Dutch Davey, Mickey McFall, Dave Kotavitch, Al Symms, Jim Spicer, Des Campbell, L. Raymond, W.O. John Montague, P.O. George Reid, Bill Kydd, Louis Segatore, Fred Porter, Surgeon Lt. Comdr. Richard Lane, Lt. Christopher Ellis, Moe Segal, Paul Kenwood, Milton Scully, Juan Sheridan

=== Post 1944 ===
In 1969, the then CFL commissioner Jake Gaudaur, gave the team a chance at championship rings for $300 each.

At the 1994 Grey Cup the CFL paid special homage to the team.

== Quebec Rugby Football Union season-by-season ==
Season	W	L	T	PF	PA	Pts	Finish	Playoffs
1943	6	4	0	62	60	16	3rd, QRFU	
1944	3	0	0	56	12	6	1st, QRFU	Won 32nd Grey Cup
