= Sam Abbott (Canadian football) =

Profile
- Positions: Halfback & Punter

Personal information
- Born: c. 1921; Montreal, Quebec, Canada

Career history
- 1944: St. Hyacinthe-Donnacona Navy

Awards and highlights
- Grey Cup champion - 1944

Sam Abbott was a Grey Cup champion Canadian football player and a sailor in the Royal Canadian Navy during World War II .

Born in Montreal, Abbott played football for the St. Hyacinthe-Donnacona Navy team in 1944, winning the Grey Cup. His name is engraved on the Cup.
