= Gene Robillard =

Canadian football player (1929–2007)

No. 83
- Position: Quarterback

Personal information
- Born: January 15, 1929; Ottawa, Ontario, Canada
- Died: April 24, 2007 (aged 78); Ottawa, Ontario, Canada
- Listed height: 5 ft 10 in (1.78 m)
- Listed weight: 180 lb (82 kg)

Career information
- High school: Tech (Ottawa)
- University: McGill (1948–1951)

Career history
- 1952: Montreal Alouettes*
- 1954: BC Lions
- * Offseason or practice squad member only

Career CFL statistics
- Passing Comp: 16
- Passing Att: 42
- Passing Yards: 161
- Stats at CFL.ca

Eugene Thomas Robillard (January 15, 1929 – April 24, 2007) was a Canadian professional football quarterback who played one season with the BC Lions of the Western Interprovincial Football Union (WIFU). He played CIS football at McGill University.

== Early life ==
Eugene Thomas Robillard was born on January 15, 1929, in Ottawa, Ontario. He played football and hockey at Ottawa Technical High School in Ottawa. He also played in Ottawa's Junior City Hockey League.

== University career ==
Robillard played for the McGill Redmen of McGill University from 1948 to 1951 as a quarterback and halfback. He earned all-star honors his senior year in 1951. He also played three years of hockey at McGill. Robillard graduated from McGill with a physical education degree in May 1952.

== Professional career ==
In January 1952, The Ottawa Citizen reported that Robillard had likely signed with the Toronto Argonauts of the Interprovincial Rugby Football Union (IRFU). Although the Argonauts had not received the contract yet, team president Bob Moran stated he was "sure Robillard signed it last week. Regardless, in April 1952, Robillard was selected by the Montreal Alouettes in the third round, with the ninth overall pick, of the 1952 IRFU college draft. He officially signed with the Alouettes on May 28, 1952. He was waived by the Alouettes in August 1952.

Robillard then signed with the Ottawa Seconds of the Quebec Rugby Football Union as a halfback in August 1952. He later signed with the BC Lions of the Western Interprovincial Football Union in 1954. He was the third-string quarterback behind John Mazur and Gerry Tuttle. Robillard played in nine games, starting one, for the Lions during the 1954 season, completing 16 of 42 passes (38.1%) for 161 yards and six interceptions.

== Personal life ==
Robillard's brother Matt Robillard played for the Ottawa Rough Riders of the IRFU in 1954. Gene served in the Royal Canadian Air Force. He was the head coach of the Ottawa Sooners of the Canadian Junior Football League in 1975. He died on April 14, 2007, in Ottawa.
