= Doug Pyzer =

Canadian football player

Profile
- Positions: Halfback, End

Personal information
- Born: October 8, 1923; Toronto, Ontario
- Died: October 25, 2016 (aged 93); Toronto, Ontario
- Listed height: 5 ft 8 in (1.73 m)
- Listed weight: 175 lb (79 kg)

Career history
- 1947–1949: Toronto Argonauts
- 1950: Edmonton Eskimos
- 1951–1953: Toronto Argonauts

Awards and highlights
- Grey Cup champion (1947, 1952)

Douglas Alexander Pyzer (October 8, 1923–October 25, 2016) was a Canadian professional football player who played for the Toronto Argonauts and Edmonton Eskimos. He won the Grey Cup with Toronto in 1947 and 1952.
