= 31st Grey Cup =

1943 Canadian Football championship game

Winnipeg RCAF Bombers	Hamilton Flying Wildcats
(6–0)	(8–1–1)
14	23
Head coach: Red Threlfall	Head coach: Brian Timmis
	1	2	3	4	Total
Winnipeg RCAF Bombers	7	0	6	1	14
Hamilton Flying Wildcats	18	0	3	2	23
- Date: November 27, 1943
- Stadium: Varsity Stadium
- Location: Toronto
- Attendance: 16,423

The 31st Grey Cup was played on November 27, 1943, before 16,423 fans at Varsity Stadium at Toronto. The Hamilton Flying Wildcats defeated the Winnipeg RCAF Bombers 23–14.

Both teams wore red and white jerseys and one team had to wear gold and blue uniforms. Hamilton wore the Bombers traditional gold and blue while Winnipeg was allowed to keep its red jerseys.
