= 37th Grey Cup =

1949 Canadian Football championship game

Montreal Alouettes	Calgary Stampeders
(8–4)	(13–1)
28	15
Head coach: Lew Hayman	Head coach: Les Lear
	1	2	3	4	Total
Montreal Alouettes	12	5	9	2	28
Calgary Stampeders	7	0	0	8	15
- Date: November 26, 1949
- Stadium: Varsity Stadium
- Location: Toronto
- Attendance: 20,087

The 37th Grey Cup was played on November 26, 1949, before 20,087 fans at Varsity Stadium at Toronto. Montreal Alouettes defeated Calgary Stampeders 28–15. Though teams from Montreal had won two Grey Cups, this was the first appearance and victory for the Montreal Alouettes franchise.

== Box Score (partial) ==
First quarter

Montreal - TD - Virgil Wagner 00-yard run (Ches McCance convert)
Montreal - TD - Bob Cunningham 00-yard pass from Frank Filchock (Ches McCance convert)
Calgary - Rouge
Calgary - TD - Harry Hood 2-yard run (convert good)

Second quarter

Montreal - TD - Herb Trawick 34 yard fumble return (convert no good)

Third quarter

Montreal - TD - Virgil Wagner 00-yard run (Ches McCance convert)
Montreal - FG - Ches McCance

Fourth quarter

Calgary - Safety - Johnny Aguirre tackled Bob Cunningham in the end zone
Calgary - TD - Sugarfoot Anderson 00 yard fumble return (convert good)
Montreal - Rouge - Ches McCance missed field goal
Montreal - Rouge - Fred Kijek

Teams	1 Q	2 Q	3 Q	4 Q	Final
Montreal Alouettes	12	5	9	2	28
Calgary Stampeders	7	0	0	8	15

== Facts ==
This was the third Grey Cup victory for a team from Montreal. In 1931 The Montreal AAA Winged Wheelers won the 19th Grey Cup game. In 1944 St. Hyacinthe-Donnacona Navy won the 32nd Grey Cup game. The Montreal AAA had also won hockey's Stanley Cup in 1893, 1894, 1902 and 1903.
