= Montreal Hornets =

- Founded: 1945; 80 years ago
- Folded: 1945; 80 years ago
- Based in: Montreal, Quebec, Canada
- League: Interprovincial Rugby Football Union

Montreal Hornets was a Canadian football team in Interprovincial Rugby Football Union. The team played in the 1945 season.

== IRFU season-by-season ==
Season	W	L	T	PF	PA	Pts	Finish	Playoffs
1945	1	5	0	32	113	2	4th, IRFU	Last Place
