= 32nd Grey Cup =

1944 Canadian Football championship game

| St. Hyacinthe-Donnacona Navy | Hamilton Flying Wildcats |
|---|---|
| (3–0) | (5–1) |
| 7 | 6 |
| Head coach: Glen Brown | Head coach: Eddie McLean |
| | 1 | 2 | 3 | 4 | Total |
|---|---|---|---|---|---|
| St. Hyacinthe-Donnacona Navy | 1 | 5 | 0 | 1 | 7 |
| Hamilton Flying Wildcats | 0 | 0 | 0 | 6 | 6 |
- Date: November 25, 1944
- Stadium: Civic Stadium
- Location: Hamilton
- Attendance: 3,871

The 32nd Grey Cup was played on November 25, 1944, before 3,871 fans at Civic Stadium in Hamilton, Ontario.

The St. Hyacinthe-Donnacona Navy defeated the Hamilton Flying Wildcats 7–6.

This was the last Grey Cup to be contested by military teams, as the Second World War ended in time for the civilian unions to conduct abbreviated seasons in 1945. It was also the last Grey Cup to not feature a Western team, although WIFU champions would not be granted an automatic berth in the Grey Cup game until 1955.
