= Ivor Wynne Stadium =

Demolished Canadian football stadium in Hamilton, Ontario

Coordinates: 43°15′9.26″N 79°49′48.89″W

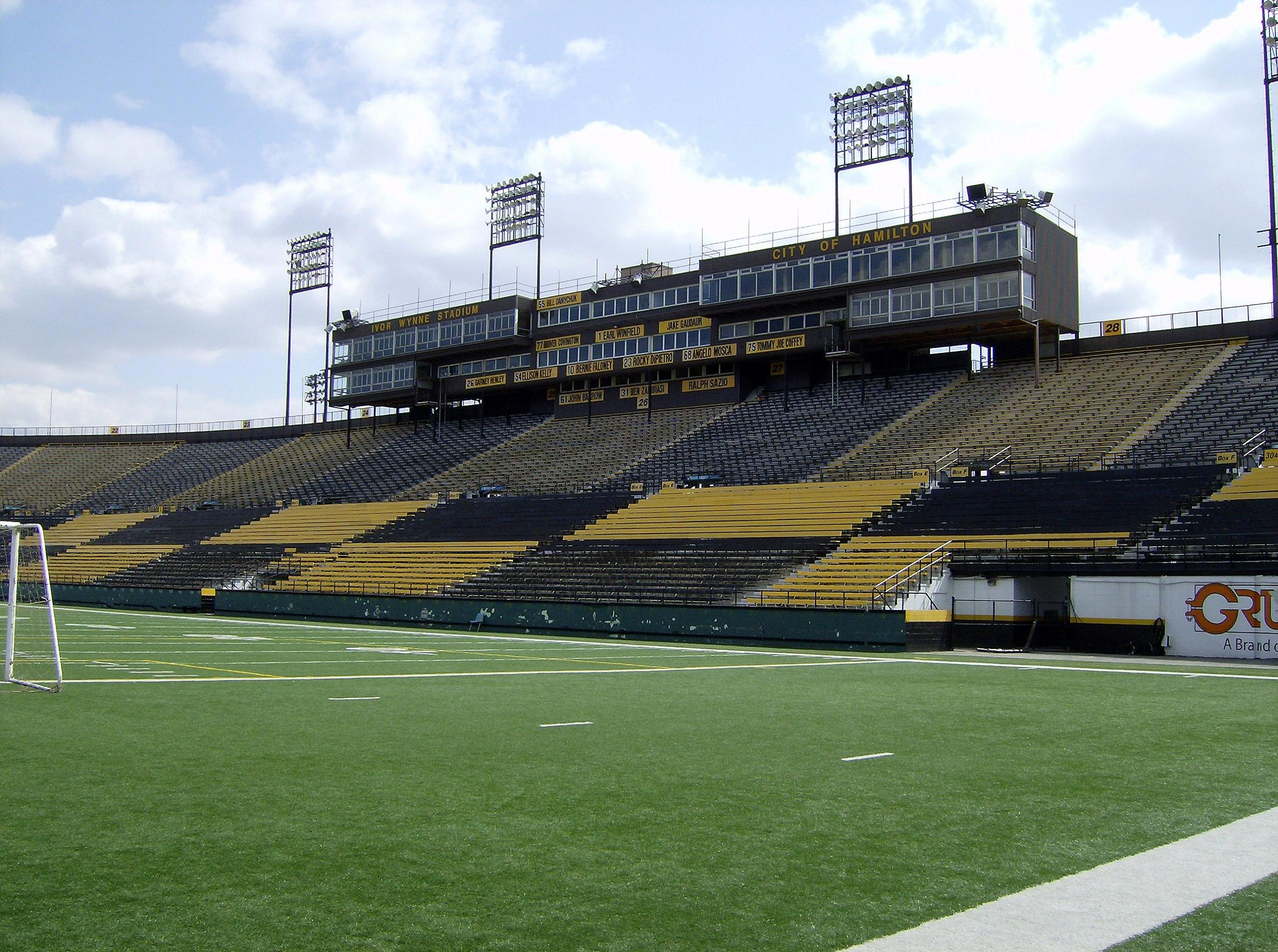
- The stadium pictured in 2007
- Interactive map of Ivor Wynne Stadium
- Former names: Civic Stadium (1930–1970)
- Location: 75 Balsam Ave. North Hamilton, Ontario L8L 8C1
- Owner: City of Hamilton
- Capacity: Football: 29,600
- Surface: AstroPlay (2003–2012); Astroturf (1971–2002); Grass (1930–1970)
- Record attendance: 55,000 (Pink Floyd concert, 1975)

Construction
- Opened: 1928
- Closed: October 27, 2012
- Demolished: December 2012 – April 2013

Tenants
- Hamilton Wildcats (ORFU/IRFU) (1941–1949); Hamilton Tiger-Cats (IRFU/CFL) (1950–2012); McMaster Marauders (U Sports) (2005–2007)

Ivor Wynne Stadium (formerly Civic Stadium) was a Canadian football stadium located at the corner of Balsam and Beechwood avenues, two blocks west of Gage Avenue North in Hamilton, Ontario, Canada. The stadium was the home of the Hamilton Tiger-Cats of the CFL from 1950 until it closed on October 27, 2012. The club's previous home was the Hamilton Amateur Athletic Association Grounds. The stadium was replaced by Tim Hortons Field, with a fixed capacity of 24,000, on the same property.

From 1928, while the stands were still under construction, the civic stadium was mainly used for track & field by the Hamilton Olympic Club and men's soccer teams, while the Hamilton AAA was used more for football and cricket. The stadium had a cinder track where the Cap Cornelius Secondary School relays were held.

== Construction history ==
The stadium, called simply the civic stadium (lower cased), was originally built in 1928 to host the 1930 British Empire Games (later the Commonwealth Games). However, playing fields had stood on the site since the city bought the land from a local farmer in 1913.

The stadium was heavily rebuilt in 1970–71. In 1971, it was renamed for Ivor Wynne, a former chairman of the city parks board who was athletic director and dean of students at McMaster University when he died in 1970. He was considered to be largely responsible for creating McMaster's physical education course and planning its athletic complex. As of 1970, Ivor Wynne Stadium and Percival Molson Memorial Stadium became the only two Canadian Football League stadiums named for people known for amateur sport. From 1971 to 1975, Ivor Wynne was the largest stadium in the CFL, with 34,500 seats.

Ivor Wynne was the first facility in Canada to use AstroTurf (but not the first with artificial turf; Empire Stadium in Vancouver was the first stadium to have it, albeit using 3M's Tartan Turf, which it installed in 1970), which it installed in 1971. In the 1980s, the west endzone bleachers were removed so that a new scoreboard could be added. That dropped capacity to about 29,500. A later retrofit of the north stand's lower east section for handicapped access in the 1990s dropped capacity further to just under 29,000.

The stadium was renovated again after the 2002 CFL season and had a new next-generation FieldTurf playing surface installed and the end zones were squared off. Shortly after the 2003 season, a new scoreboard was erected in the west end of the stadium; owing to sponsorship, it was known as Dofasco TigerVision.

In 2012, the stadium had a large grandstand on one side of the field, with a small section curving around the end zone, and a separate grandstand on the opposite side of the field, with a capacity of just under 29,000.

In 2011, plans were announced to renovate the stadium again in 2012, with a completion date in 2014, and the stadium would also be used for the then upcoming 2015 Pan American Games. On February 25, 2011, the Toronto 2015 Pan Am board of directors approved stadium plans which would see the south side stands demolished and rebuilt and the north side stands extensively renovated. However, that plan was not used. A new plan announced August 31, 2011, called for a brand-new $150 million stadium with a new north–south field alignment that would provide equal advantage for sports where prevailing wind direction and sun glares are equal for both teams. It would be a multi-function stadium, hosting concerts and football, soccer, and hockey games. During construction, the Tiger-Cats played at the University of Guelph's Alumni Stadium for the 2013 season, and proceeds from the temporary site agreement went to the Gryphon Athletics fundraising campaign as a part of the University of Guelph's BetterPlanet Project.

== Events ==
On August 8, 1961, the Tiger-Cats defeated the visiting Buffalo Bills, at that time a member of the American Football League, in a preseason exhibition game in Hamilton. The Bills, playing the entire game under Canadian rules, lost 38–21. The game marked the only CFL–AFL meeting where the CFL team won.

Some concerts have occurred at Ivor Wynne. The biggest was Pink Floyd in 1975, during which a pyrotechnics display damaged the scoreboard. The last concert held at Ivor Wynne was Rush in 1979 until the Tragically Hip played on October 6, 2012, before departing for an American tour.

In April 2005, Ivor Wynne hosted Our Game to Give, a charity hockey game instigated as a result of the 2004–05 NHL lockout. Nearly 20,000 spectators braved inclement weather to watch locked-out NHL players and a handful of former professionals lace up the skates at an outdoor charity hockey game. Hockey Hall of Famer Gordie Howe dropped the puck for the ceremonial faceoff. Team Gilmour rallied in the third period to defeat Team Staios 11–6. Proceeds of the Our Game To Give event went to the Tsunami Relief Fund of the Canadian Red Cross and Camp Trillium, the Ontario facility for children with cancer.

On January 21, 2012, Ivor Wynne hosted a regular season game of the American Hockey League, between the Toronto Marlies and the Hamilton Bulldogs. It was the first outdoor game in Canada in the league's history and the fourth in an annual series of outdoor AHL games.

=== Grey Cup ===
Ivor Wynne Stadium hosted the Grey Cup three times:

- in 1944, when the Flying Wildcats were defeated by a wartime team from the Montreal Navy
- in 1972, with a win by the hometown Tiger-Cats over Saskatchewan before a capacity crowd
- 1996, when the Hamilton Tiger-Cats did not play. In the 1996 game, temporary west and east end zone seating raised capacity to 40,000. That game, perhaps one of the greatest of all time, was played in a steady snowstorm, and was won by Doug Flutie and the Toronto Argonauts over the Edmonton Eskimos.

Grey Cup	Date	Champion	Score	Loser	Attendance
32nd Grey Cup	November 25, 1944	Montreal Navy	7–6	Hamilton Flying Wildcats	3,871
60th Grey Cup	December 3, 1972	Hamilton Tiger Cats	13–10	Saskatchewan Roughriders	33,993
84th Grey Cup	November 24, 1996	Toronto Argonauts	43–37	Edmonton Eskimos	38,595

== See also ==
- List of sports venues in Hamilton, Ontario
- List of Canadian Football League stadiums
- Venues of the 2015 Pan American and Parapan American Games
- List of Commonwealth Games venues
