= Hamilton Wildcats =

Canadian football team

Logo

General information
- Founded: 1941; 85 years ago
- Folded: 1950; 76 years ago (Merged with Hamilton Tigers to form Hamilton Tiger-Cats)
- Stadium: Civic Stadium
- Headquartered: Hamilton, Ontario, Canada
- Colours: Red, White

Team history
- Hamilton Wildcats (1941–1942, 1945–1949); Hamilton Flying Wildcats (1943–1944)

League / conference affiliations
- Ontario Rugby Football Union; Interprovincial Rugby Football Union

Championships
- Grey Cups: 1; 1943

The Hamilton Wildcats were a Canadian football team based in Hamilton, Ontario that played in the Ontario Rugby Football Union (ORFU) from 1941 to 1947, and in the Interprovincial Rugby Football Union (IRFU) from 1948 to 1949. The team was formed to play in the ORFU in 1941 to fill the void left by the Hamilton Tigers, who ceased operations that year due to many players joining the army. In 1943 and 1944, the team assumed the name Hamilton Flying Wildcats to reflect the Royal Canadian Air Force personnel on the team. After struggling to compete on a sound financial level with the Hamilton Tigers, who resumed operations following World War II, the two clubs merged in 1950 to form the Hamilton Tiger-Cats.

== History ==
=== Ontario Rugby Football Union ===
For many years, Hamilton had an unstable presence in the ORFU, with various teams folding and being renamed. The more established IRFU team, the Hamilton Tigers, faced similar struggles, and World War II proved disruptive to both leagues' operations. In 1940, as part of a wave of hastily assembled teams brought together to fill the void of the ORFU teams that had suspended operations, the ORFU returned to Hamilton with a team informally named after the Hamilton Alerts, a short-lived and long-dormant team notable for winning the 1912 Grey Cup.

In 1941, the Tigers suspended operations due to the war, and the IRFU as a whole would do so from 1942 and 1944, leaving many talented players to join teams in the ORFU as well as a void in Hamilton football. Hamilton's ORFU franchise requested to use the Tigers name and colours but were rebuffed, opting to take on the name Hamilton Wildcats and use colours of red and white. The Wildcats' usage of numerous Tigers alumni led the Wildcats to a very successful three years in which they posted a 19–6–1 record with two appearances in the Grey Cup championship game with one win coming in 1943. In the 1943 and 1944 seasons, the team is officially recognized as the Hamilton Flying Wildcats due to the RCAF personnel playing on the team. Consequently, the team that won the 31st Grey Cup is recorded as the Hamilton Flying Wildcats.

After the war ended, the IRFU resumed operations and players that had played for the Tigers were returned to their club. The Wildcats dropped the "flying" from their nickname since the RCAF personnel no longer played for them. After a difficult season in 1945, which saw the club miss the playoffs, the Wildcats claimed back-to-back regular season first-place finishes in 1946 and 1947, but lost in the ORFU finals both years.

=== Interprovincial Rugby Football Union and merger ===
Due to monetary disputes that the Hamilton Tigers were having with the IRFU, the Tigers transferred to the ORFU, with the Wildcats switching to the IRFU on April 9, 1948. The switch proved to be difficult for the team, who went from first in the ORFU to dead last in the IRFU, with only one win in their two seasons in that league. Both teams were struggling to compete for fan support and the financial repercussions started to mount. As a result, local prominent citizens including Mr. Ralph W. Cooper, Mr. F.M. Gibson, Mr. C.C. Lawson and Mr. Sam Manson decided that the two clubs should amalgamate and operate as one entity. As such, the Hamilton Tiger-Cats football club began play in 1950 in the IRFU as the singular representative of the city of Hamilton.

== Canadian Football Hall of Famers ==
- Len Back
- Tom Casey
- Joe "King" Krol
- Vince Scott
- Jimmie Simpson

== Season-by-season ==
Grey Cup Championships	Division Championships	Regular season Championships

Season	League	Finish	Wins	Losses	Ties	Playoffs
1941	ORFU	1st	5	0	1	Lost Eastern Final (Rough Riders) 7–2
1942	ORFU	3rd	6	4	0	
1943	ORFU	1st	8	1	1	Won ORFU Final (Beachers) 7–2; Won East Final (Lachine RCAF) 7–6; Won Grey Cup (Winnipeg RCAF Bombers) 23–14
1944	ORFU	1st	5	1	0	Won ORFU Final (Beachers) 1–1 series (13–10 points); Lost Grey Cup (St. Hyacinthe-Donnacona Navy) 7–6
1945	ORFU	3rd	3	5	0	
1946	ORFU	1st	8	1	1	Won ORFU Semi-Finals (Imperials) 14–5; Lost ORFU Finals (Beachers) 13–6
1947	ORFU	1st	9	1	0	Won ORFU Semi-Finals (Indians) 14–0; Lost ORFU Finals (Trojans) 15–3
1948	IRFU	4th	1	10	1	
1949	IRFU	4th	0	12	0	
Merged to form Hamilton Tiger-Cats
Regular season totals			45	35	4	
Playoff totals			5	4	0	
Grey Cup totals			1	1	–	
