= 2025 Calgary Stampeders season =

CFL team season

- General manager: Dave Dickenson
- President: John Hufnagel
- Head coach: Dave Dickenson
- Home stadium: McMahon Stadium

Results
- Record: 11–7
- Division place: 3rd, West
- Playoffs: Lost West Semi-Final
- Team MOP: Dedrick Mills
- Team MODP: Clarence Hicks
- Team MOC: Jalen Philpot
- Team MOOL: Zack Williams
- Team MOST: Mark Vassett
- Team MOR: Christopher Fortin

Uniform
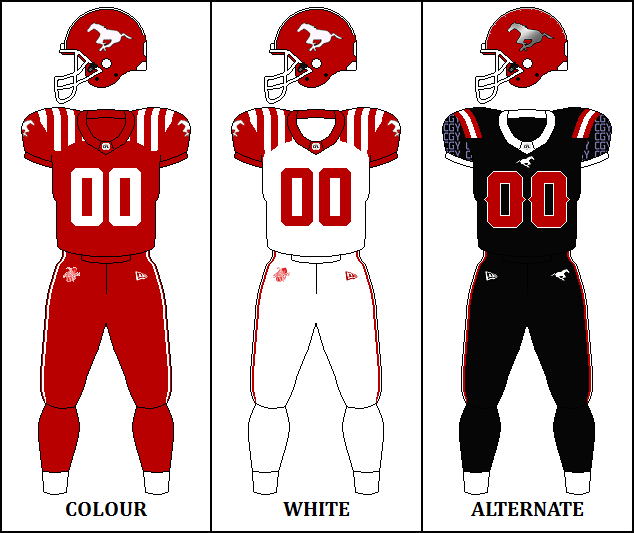

The 2025 Calgary Stampeders season was the 67th season for the team in the Canadian Football League (CFL) and their 80th overall. The Stampeders improved upon their 5–12–1 record from 2024 after recording their sixth win in week 10. The team then qualified for the playoffs following a one-year absence after an Edmonton Elks loss to the BC Lions in week 20. However, the Stampeders lost to the BC Lions in the West Semi-Final. The 2025 CFL season was Dave Dickenson's ninth season as head coach and his third season as general manager.

The Calgary Stampeders drew an average home attendance of 22,295, the 5th highest of all Canadian football teams in the world.

== Offseason ==
=== CFL global draft ===
The 2025 CFL global draft took place on April 29, 2025. The Stampeders had two selections in the draft, holding the first pick in each round.

Round	Pick	Player	Position	School	Nationality
1	1	Fraser Masin	P	Mississippi	Australia
2	10	Mark Vassett	P	Colorado	Australia

== CFL national draft ==
The 2025 CFL draft took place on April 29, 2025. The Stampeders had ten selections in the eight-round draft, including the first overall selection, which was the first top selection for the franchise since 2014 CFL draft. The team also received two additional selections, at the end of the first and second rounds, after the BC Lions forfeited their picks due to exceeding the 2024 salary cap. Not including traded picks, the team selected first in each round of the draft after finishing last in the 2024 league standings.

Round	Pick	Player	Position	School	Hometown
1	1	Damien Alford	WR	Utah	Montreal, QC
1	8	Christopher Fortin	OL	Connecticut	Saint-René, QC
2	17	Quincy Vaughn	TE	North Dakota	Hamilton, ON
3	20	Anton Haie	DB	Laval	Lévis, QC
4	32	Nicky Farinaccio	LB	Montreal	Montreal, QC
5	38	Vyshonne Janusas	WR	Guelph	Windsor, ON
6	47	Ludovick Choquette	RB	Long Island	Saint-Jean-sur-Richelieu, QC
7	56	Matthew Stokman	OL	Manitoba	Winnipeg, MB
7	61	Max von Muehldorfer	DL	Western	Calgary, AB
8	65	Ashton Miller-Melancon	DB	Queen's	Dorval, QC

== Preseason ==
On February 6, 2025, it was announced that the Stampeders would play the BC Lions in Langford, British Columbia at Starlight Stadium for their preseason game.

=== Schedule ===
Week	Game	Date	Kickoff	Opponent	Results		TV	Venue	Attendance	Summary
Week	Game	Date	Kickoff	Opponent	Score	Record	TV	Venue	Attendance	Summary
A	1	Mon, May 19	2:00 p.m. MDT	at BC Lions	W 26–16	1–0	CFL+	Starlight Stadium	N/A	Recap
B	2	Sat, May 24	7:30 p.m. MDT	vs. Edmonton Elks	W 31–4	2–0	CFL+	McMahon Stadium	15,531	Recap
C	Bye									

# Games played with red uniforms.

== Regular season ==
=== Standings ===
West Division
Team	GP	W	L	T	Pts	PF	PA	Div	Stk	
Saskatchewan Roughriders	18	12	6	0	24	472	409	5–5	L2	Details
BC Lions	18	11	7	0	22	559	499	6–4	W6	Details
Calgary Stampeders	18	11	7	0	22	488	416	7–3	W3	Details
Winnipeg Blue Bombers	18	10	8	0	20	459	424	4–6	W2	Details
Edmonton Elks	18	7	11	0	14	422	490	3–7	L2	Details

=== Schedule ===
The week 6 game against the Saskatchewan Roughriders was originally scheduled for July 11 at 7pm MDT, but was postponed to July 12 at 2pm MDT due to poor air quality.

Week	Game	Date	Kickoff	Opponent	Results		TV	Venue	Attendance	Summary
Week	Game	Date	Kickoff	Opponent	Score	Record	TV	Venue	Attendance	Summary
1	1	Sat, June 7	5:00 p.m. MDT	vs. Hamilton Tiger-Cats	W 38–26	1–0	TSN/CTV	McMahon Stadium	18,682	Recap
2	2	Sat, June 14	2:00 p.m. MDT	at Toronto Argonauts	W 29–19	2–0	TSN/CBSSN	BMO Field	17,902	Recap
3	3	Sat, June 21	2:00 p.m. MDT	vs. Ottawa Redblacks	L 12–20	2–1	TSN/RDS/CBSSN	McMahon Stadium	16,584	Recap
4	Bye									
5	4	Thu, July 3	7:00 p.m. MDT	vs. Winnipeg Blue Bombers	W 37–16	3–1	TSN/CBSSN	McMahon Stadium	22,485	Recap
6	5	Sat, July 12	2:00 p.m. MDT	at Saskatchewan Roughriders	W 24–10	4–1	TSN/RDS	Mosaic Stadium	26,675	Recap
7	6	Fri, July 18	6:30 p.m. MDT	at Winnipeg Blue Bombers	W 41–20	5–1	TSN/RDS/CBSSN	Princess Auto Stadium	32,343	Recap
8	7	Thu, July 24	7:00 p.m. MDT	vs. Montreal Alouettes	L 21–23	5–2	TSN/RDS/CBSSN	McMahon Stadium	19,863	Recap
9	8	Thu, July 31	5:00 p.m. MDT	at Ottawa Redblacks	L 11–31	5–3	TSN/RDS	TD Place Stadium	16,115	Recap
10	9	Sat, Aug 9	5:00 p.m. MDT	vs. Winnipeg Blue Bombers	W 28–27	6–3	TSN/CBSSN	McMahon Stadium	20,902	Recap
11	Bye									
12	10	Sat, Aug 23	5:00 p.m. MDT	vs. Saskatchewan Roughriders	W 32–15	7–3	TSN	McMahon Stadium	28,295	Recap
13	11	Mon, Sept 1	4:00 p.m. MDT	vs. Edmonton Elks	W 28–7	8–3	TSN/CBSSN	McMahon Stadium	27,764	Recap
14	12	Sat, Sept 6	5:00 p.m. MDT	at Edmonton Elks	L 19–31	8–4	TSN	Commonwealth Stadium	28,365	Recap
15	Bye									
16	13	Fri, Sept 19	7:30 p.m. MDT	vs. BC Lions	L 23–52	8–5	TSN	McMahon Stadium	23,554	Recap
17	14	Fri, Sept 26	5:00 p.m. MDT	at Montreal Alouettes	L 20–38	8–6	TSN/RDS	Molson Stadium	22,070	Recap
18	15	Sat, Oct 4	5:00 p.m. MDT	at BC Lions	L 24–38	8–7	TSN	BC Place	28,308	Recap
19	16	Sat, Oct 11	1:00 p.m. MDT	at Hamilton Tiger-Cats	W 37–20	9–7	TSN/CTV/RDS2	Tim Hortons Field	22,313	Recap
20	17	Sat, Oct 18	5:00 p.m. MDT	vs. Toronto Argonauts	W 44–13	10–7	TSN	McMahon Stadium	22,528	Recap
21	18	Fri, Oct 24	7:30 p.m. MDT	at Edmonton Elks	W 20–10	11–7	TSN	Commonwealth Stadium	14,621	Recap

# Games played with red uniforms.
# Games played with white uniforms.
# Games played with black uniforms.

== Post-season ==
=== Schedule ===
Game	Date	Kickoff	Opponent	Results		TV	Venue	Attendance	Summary
Game	Date	Kickoff	Opponent	Score	Record	TV	Venue	Attendance	Summary
West Semi-Final	Sat, Nov 1	3:30 p.m. MDT	at BC Lions	L 30–33	0–1	TSN/RDS	BC Place	26,383	Recap

# Games played with white uniforms.

== Roster ==
2025 Calgary Stampeders final roster
**Quarterbacks**: 3 Vernon Adams; 16 Josh Love; 19 Quincy Vaughn; **Running backs**: 28 Ludovick Choquette; 26 Dedrick Mills; **Receivers**: 80 Damien Alford; 14 Clark Barnes; 87 Erik Brooks; 4 Tevin Jones; 85 Jalen Philpot; 15 Dominique Rhymes	**Offensive linemen**: 61 William Barnes T; 63 Rodeem Brown C; 60 D'Antne Demery T; 57 Chris Fortin C; 65 Christy Nkanu G; 67 Zack Williams G; **Defensive linemen**: 90 Miles Brown DT; 12 Clarence Hicks DE; 96 Jaylon Hutchings DT; 91 Lorenzo Mauldin DE; 58 Shaun Peterson DE; 97 Justin Sambu DT; 77 Kelon Thomas DE; 93 Charles Wiley DE	**Linebackers**: 51 Kelechi Anyalebechi; 1 Adam Bighill; 59 Justin Herdman-Reed; 50 Marquel Lee; 6 Derrick Moncrief; 48 Jake Roberts; 42 Micah Teitz; **Defensive backs**: 38 Sheldon Arnold; 21 Bailey Devine-Scott; 25 Jaydon Grant; 0 Adrian Greene; 44 Anthony Johnson; 29 Ben Labrosse; 27 Godfrey Onyeka; 49 Dolani Robinson; 40 Jackson Sombach; 36 Kaylyn St-Cyr	**Special teams**: 43 Jason MacGougan LS; 30 René Paredes K; 70 Mark Vassett P; **Practice roster**: 86 Daylen Baldwin SB; 74 Josiah Coatney DT; 39 Jacobe Covington DB; 81 Vyshonne Janusas SB; 34 Fraser Masin P; 46 Jordan Noyes K; 98 Devonte O'Malley DT; 92 Kyle Samson DT; -- Hunter Steward T; 99 B. J. Thompson DE; 33 D. J. Williams RB; 82 Tommy Wilson WR	**Injured list**: 20 Jeshrun Antwi RB; 84 Reggie Begelton SB; 66 Bryce Bell C; 45 Morice Blackwell Jr. LB; 17 Logan Bonner QB; 24 Brady Breeze DB; 54 D. J. Coker T; 52 Aaron Crawford LS; 41 Nicky Farinaccio LB; 94 Anthony Federico DE; 8 Anton Haie DB; 11 Malik Henry WR; 88 Kaylon Horton WR; 47 George Idoko DE; 68 Tomas Jack-Kurdyla G; 71 Jason Janvier-Messier DE; 56 Gary Johnson LB; 95 Daniel Joseph DE/DT; 23 William Langlais FB; 64 Preston Nichols T; 7 Folarin Orimolade DE; 35 Tyler Richardson DB; 37 Lance Robinson DB; 69 Kyle Saxelid G; 2 P. J. Walker QB; 9 Damon Webb DB; 31 Kyle Wilson LB
Italics indicate American player • **Bold** indicates Global player •

== Coaching staff ==
Calgary Stampeders staff
Front office: President – Jay McNeil; General Manager – Dave Dickenson; Director of Player Personnel – Brendan Mahoney; Director of U.S. Scouting – Cole Hufnagel; Football Administration Director – Molly Campbell; Director of Football Operations – Nick Bojda; CFL Draft Coordinator – Dwayne Cameron; Head Coaches: Head Coach – Dave Dickenson; Offensive coaches: Offensive Coordinator and Offensive Line – Pat DelMonaco; Quarterbacks – Dakota Prukop; Receivers – Markus Howell; Running Backs and Assistant Offensive Line – Ucambre Williams; Offensive and Special Teams Assistant – Colton Hunchak	Defensive coaches: Defensive Coordinator – Bob Slowik; Linebackers and Run Game Coordinator – Marcus Klund; Defensive Line – John Bowman; Defensive Backs – Barron Miles; Special teams coaches: Special Teams Coordinator – Craig Dickenson; Strength and conditioning: Strength and Conditioning – Daryl Chambers; → Coaching staff
