= 2025 Edmonton Elks season =

CFL team season

- General manager: Ed Hervey
- President: Chris Morris
- Head coach: Mark Kilam
- Home stadium: Commonwealth Stadium

Results
- Record: 7–11
- Division place: 5th, West
- Playoffs: Did not qualify
- Team MOP: Justin Rankin
- Team MODP: Kordell Jackson
- Team MOC: Joel Dublanko
- Team MOOL: David Beard
- Team MOST: Javon Leake
- Team MOR: Chelen Garnes

Uniform
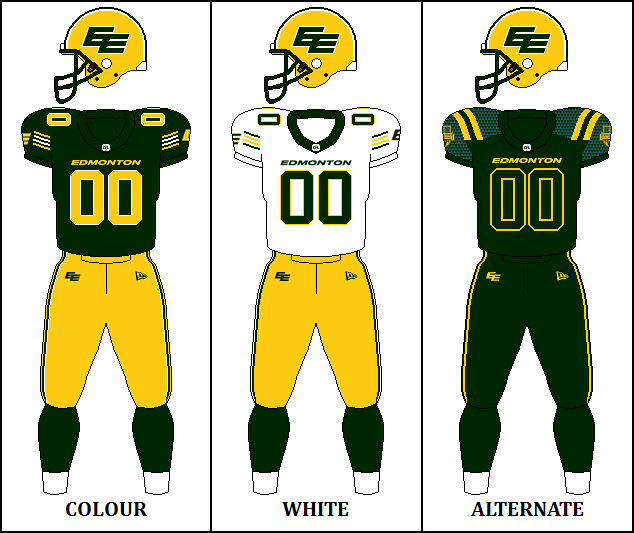

The 2025 Edmonton Elks season was the 67th season for the team in the Canadian Football League (CFL) and their 76th overall. The Elks were eliminated from post-season contention for the fifth consecutive season following their loss to the BC Lions in week 20.

The team's 2025 season featured a new permanent head coach, general manager, and president, after Jarious Jackson, Geroy Simon, and Rick LeLacheur finished the 2024 season in interim roles. On October 30, 2024, it was announced that Chris Morris had been named president and CEO for the Elks. On November 19, 2024, the team announced that Ed Hervey had been hired as the team's general manager. Finally, on December 2, 2024, the Elks announced that Mark Kilam had been named head coach for the team.

The Edmonton Elks drew an average home attendance of 19,050, the 7th highest of all Canadian football teams in the world.

== Offseason ==
=== CFL global draft ===
The 2025 CFL global draft took place on April 29, 2025. The Elks had two selections in the draft, holding the third pick in each round.

Round	Pick	Player	Position	School	Nationality
1	3	Richard Jibunor	LB	Troy	Nigeria
2	12	Alex Raich	LB	Kansas	Switzerland

== CFL national draft ==
The 2025 CFL draft took place on April 29, 2025. The Elks had seven selections in the eight-round draft after forfeiting their first-round and eighth-round picks, but acquiring a third-round pick in a trade. Not including traded picks or forfeitures, the team selected third in each round of the draft, after finishing seventh in the 2024 league standings.

Round	Pick	Player	Position	School	Hometown
2	10	Darien Newell	DL	Queen's	Brampton, ON
3	22	Skyler Griffith	TE	British Columbia	Winnipeg, MB
3	24	Isaiah Knight	RB	British Columbia	Ottawa, ON
4	31	Silas Hubert	DL	Queen's	Hastings, ON
5	40	Domenico Piazza	OL	McGill	Mercier, QC
6	49	Daniel Hocevar	OL	Guelph	Stoney Creek, ON
7	58	Kolby Hurford	WR	Alberta	Redwater, AB

== Preseason ==
=== Schedule ===
Week	Game	Date	Kickoff	Opponent	Results		TV	Venue	Attendance	Summary
Week	Game	Date	Kickoff	Opponent	Score	Record	TV	Venue	Attendance	Summary
A	Bye									
B	1	Sat, May 24	7:30 p.m. MDT	at Calgary Stampeders	L 4–31	0–1	CFL+	McMahon Stadium	15,531	Recap
C	2	Fri, May 30	7:30 p.m. MDT	vs. BC Lions	W 20–19	1–1	CFL+	Commonwealth Stadium	12,769	Recap

== Regular season ==
=== Season standings ===
West Division
Team	GP	W	L	T	Pts	PF	PA	Div	Stk	
Saskatchewan Roughriders	18	12	6	0	24	472	409	5–5	L2	Details
BC Lions	18	11	7	0	22	559	499	6–4	W6	Details
Calgary Stampeders	18	11	7	0	22	488	416	7–3	W3	Details
Winnipeg Blue Bombers	18	10	8	0	20	459	424	4–6	W2	Details
Edmonton Elks	18	7	11	0	14	422	490	3–7	L2	Details

=== Season schedule ===
Week	Game	Date	Kickoff	Opponent	Results		TV	Venue	Attendance	Summary
Week	Game	Date	Kickoff	Opponent	Score	Record	TV	Venue	Attendance	Summary
1	1	Sat, June 7	8:00 p.m. MDT	at BC Lions	L 14–31	0–1	TSN/CBSSN	BC Place	52,837	Recap
2	Bye									
3	2	Thu, June 19	7:00 p.m. MDT	vs. Montreal Alouettes	L 28–38	0–2	TSN/RDS/CBSSN	Commonwealth Stadium	14,389	Recap
4	3	Thu, June 26	6:30 p.m. MDT	at Winnipeg Blue Bombers	L 23–36	0–3	TSN/RDS/CBSSN	Princess Auto Stadium	32,343	Recap
5	4	Sun, July 6	5:00 p.m. MDT	vs. Ottawa Redblacks	W 39–33	1–3	TSN/RDS/CBSSN	Commonwealth Stadium	16,588	Recap
6	5	Sun, July 13	5:00 p.m. MDT	vs. BC Lions	L 14–32	1–4	TSN	Commonwealth Stadium	17,559	Recap
7	Bye									
8	6	Fri, July 25	7:00 p.m. MDT	at Saskatchewan Roughriders	L 18–21	1–5	TSN	Mosaic Stadium	27,933	Recap
9	7	Sat, Aug 2	1:00 p.m. MDT	vs. Hamilton Tiger-Cats	L 24–28	1–6	TSN/CTV	Commonwealth Stadium	18,337	Recap
10	8	Fri, Aug 8	5:30 p.m. MDT	at Montreal Alouettes	W 23–22	2–6	TSN/RDS	Molson Stadium	20,525	Recap
11	9	Fri, Aug 15	7:00 p.m. MDT	vs. Toronto Argonauts	W 28–20	3–6	TSN	Commonwealth Stadium	16,526	Recap
12	10	Fri, Aug 22	5:30 p.m. MDT	at Ottawa Redblacks	W 30–20	4–6	TSN/RDS	TD Place Stadium	17,469	Recap
13	11	Mon, Sept 1	4:00 p.m. MDT	at Calgary Stampeders	L 7–28	4–7	TSN/CBSSN	McMahon Stadium	27,764	Recap
14	12	Sat, Sept 6	5:00 p.m. MDT	vs. Calgary Stampeders	W 31–19	5–7	TSN	Commonwealth Stadium	28,365	Recap
15	13	Sat, Sept 13	1:00 p.m. MDT	at Toronto Argonauts	L 30–31	5–8	TSN/CTV	BMO Field	14,742	Recap
16	14	Sat, Sept 20	5:00 p.m. MDT	at Hamilton Tiger-Cats	L 27–29	5–9	TSN/RDS2	Tim Hortons Field	22,114	Recap
17	15	Sat, Sept 27	5:00 p.m. MDT	vs. Saskatchewan Roughriders	W 27–25	6–9	TSN	Commonwealth Stadium	30,053	Recap
18	Bye									
19	16	Sat, Oct 11	5:00 p.m. MDT	vs. Winnipeg Blue Bombers	W 25–20	7–9	TSN	Commonwealth Stadium	15,013	Recap
20	17	Fri, Oct 17	8:30 p.m. MDT	at BC Lions	L 24–37	7–10	TSN	BC Place	26,308	Recap
21	18	Fri, Oct 24	7:30 p.m. MDT	vs. Calgary Stampeders	L 10–20	7–11	TSN	Commonwealth Stadium	14,621	Recap

== Roster ==
2025 Edmonton Elks final roster
**Quarterbacks**: 7 Cody Fajardo; 2 Tre Ford; 14 Cole Snyder; **Running backs**: 35 Bradley Hladik; 34 Isaiah Knight; 22 Javon Leake; 46 Jacob Plamondon; 5 Justin Rankin; **Receivers**: 85 Jalon Calhoun; 84 Odieu Hiliare; 11 Kaion Julien-Grant; 83 Tyson Middlemost; 87 Binjimen Victor	**Offensive linemen**: 57 David Beard C/G; 63 Greg Eiland T; 61 Mark Evans G/T; 62 Martez Ivey T; 65 Mark Korte G/C; 67 Gregor MacKellar G; 56 Jaxon Morkin C/T; 64 Carter O'Donnell G; **Defensive linemen**: 58 Elijah Alston DE; 4 Brandon Barlow DE; 93 Francis Bemiy DT; 99 Silas Hubert DE; 54 Tyreek Johnson DT; 42 Noah Taylor DE; 90 Jordan Williams DT	**Linebackers**: 47 D. K. Bonhomme; 50 Joel Dublanko; 38 Eteva Mauga-Clements; 43 Brock Mogensen; 51 Alex Raich; 41 Josiah Schakel; **Defensive backs**: 18 Jerrell Cummings; 30 Tyrell Ford; 25 Chelen Garnes; 13 Kordell Jackson; 32 Leonard Johnson; 20 Kenny Logan; 29 J. J. Ross; 0 Kobe Williams	**Special teams**: 26 Vincent Blanchard K; 52 Luke Burton-Krahn LS; 10 Jake Julien P; **Practice roster**: 82 Ayir Asante WR; 37 Bryce Cosby DB; 39 Ethan Duane P; 89 Justin McGriff WR; 97 Gavin Meyer DT; 49 Xander Mueller LB; 12 Zach Zebrowski QB; **Suspended list**: 17 Kearis Jackson WR; -- Will McElvain QB; 1 James Wiggins DB	**Injured list**: 48 Nick Anderson LB; 69 Brett Boyko OL; 91 Jared Brinkman DT; 44 Michael Brodrique LB; 16 Devodric Bynum DB; 94 Jake Ceresna DT; 92 Noah Curtis DT; 6 Steven Dunbar WR; 95 Tomari Fox DT; 19 Kurleigh Gittens SB; 24 Cody Grace P; 27 Tanner Green FB; 80 Skyler Griffith FB; 96 Richard Jibunor DE; 3 Jonathan Kongbo DE; 88 T. J. Luther WR; 81 Zach Mathis WR; 9 Royce Metchie DB; 45 Nyles Morgan LB; 23 Olivier Muembi LB; 86 Arkell Smith SB; 40 Robbie Smith DE; 36 Jaylin Williams DB
Italics indicate American player • **Bold** indicates Global player

== Coaching staff ==
Edmonton Elks staff
Front office: Owner – Larry Thompson; President and CEO – Chris Morris; General Manager – Ed Hervey; Senior Assistant General Manager – Spencer Zimmerman; Direct of U.S. Scouting – Spencer Boehm; Direct of Canadian Scouting – Rich Massaro; Direct of Football Operations – Nick Pelletier; Head coach: Head Coach – Mark Kilam; Assistant Head Coach/Offensive Coordinator – Jordan Maksymic; Offensive coaches: Offensive Line and Run Game Coordinator – Stephen Sorrells; Running Backs and Offensive Assistant – Trysten Dyce; Receivers – Jason Tucker	Defensive coaches: Defensive Coordinator and Linebackers – J. C. Sherritt; Defensive Backs – Aaron Grymes; Defensive Assistant – Demetrious Maxie; Defensive Quality Control – Danny Nesbitt; Special teams coach: Special Teams Coordinator – Demetrious Maxie; Special Teams Assistant – Des Catellier; Strength and conditioning: Strength and Conditioning Coach – Alex Salterio; → Coaching staff
