= Anton Haie =

Canadian football player (born 2000)

- Haie in 2026

No. 31 – Calgary Stampeders
- Position: Defensive back
- Roster status: Active
- CFL status: National

Personal information
- Born: September 26, 2000 (age 26); Quebec City, Canada
- Listed height: 6 ft 0 in (1.83 m)
- Listed weight: 200 lb (91 kg)

Career information
- High school: Séminaire Saint-François (Saint-Augustin-de-Desmaures)
- CEGEP: Campus Notre-Dame-de-Foy
- University: Laval (2021–2024)
- CFL draft: 2025: 3rd round, 20th overall pick

Career history
- Calgary Stampeders (2025–present)

Awards and highlights
- 2× Vanier Cup champion (2022, 2024)
- Stats at CFL.ca

Anton Haie (born September 26, 2000) is a Canadian professional football defensive back for the Calgary Stampeders of the Canadian Football League (CFL). He played U Sports football for the Laval Rouge et Or and was selected by the Stampeders in the third round of the 2025 CFL draft.

== Early life ==
Anton Haie was born on September 26, 2000, in Quebec City, Canada. He started playing football at age 11. He played high school football at Séminaire Saint-François in Saint-Augustin-de-Desmaures, Quebec, under former CFL player Pascal Masson. Haie played CEGEP football at Campus Notre-Dame-de-Foy in Saint-Augustin-de-Desmaures.

== University career ==
Haie played U Sports football for the Laval Rouge et Or of Université Laval from 2021 to 2024 as a defensive halfback and special teams player. He appeared in 26 career games, recording 34 tackles, one interception, seven pass breakups, four forced fumbles, and five blocked kicks. Haie helped the Rouge et Or win the 57th Vanier Cup in 2022 and the 59th Vanier Cup in 2024. He was the team's hairdresser during his time at Laval. He graduated in December 2024 with a degree in business administration.

== Professional career ==
Haie won the three-cone drill at the 2025 CFL Combine with a time of 6.62 seconds. It was the fourth-fastest three-cone in CFL Combine history. He also finished second in the change-of-direction test with 3.96 seconds. Haie was selected by the Calgary Stampeders in the third round, with the 20th overall pick, of the 2025 CFL draft. Dwayne Cameron, the Stampeders' director of Canadian scouting, said that Haie has "the frame where he can play either (strongside linebacker or free safety). He's got good coverage skills, excellent speed and elite change-direction times." Haie signed with the Stampeders on May 5. He was roommates with Nicky Farinaccio and Christopher Fortin during 2025 training camp. Haie suffered a season-ending dislocated shoulder on the second day of training camp.

Haie was placed on the one-game injured list on June 4, 2026, one day before the start of the 2026 regular season. He was activated from the injured list on June 26 and made his CFL debut the next day against the BC Lions, posting one tackle on defense and one tackle on special teams. He was placed on the one-game injured list again on August 28, and was activated on September 11, 2026.

== Personal life ==
In March 2025, Haei purchased a Sugar Daddy's candy store in Montreal. In December 2025, he posted a viral video on TikTok in which he encountered a grizzly bear at Banff National Park.
