= Erik Brooks (Canadian football) =

American gridiron football player (born 1999)

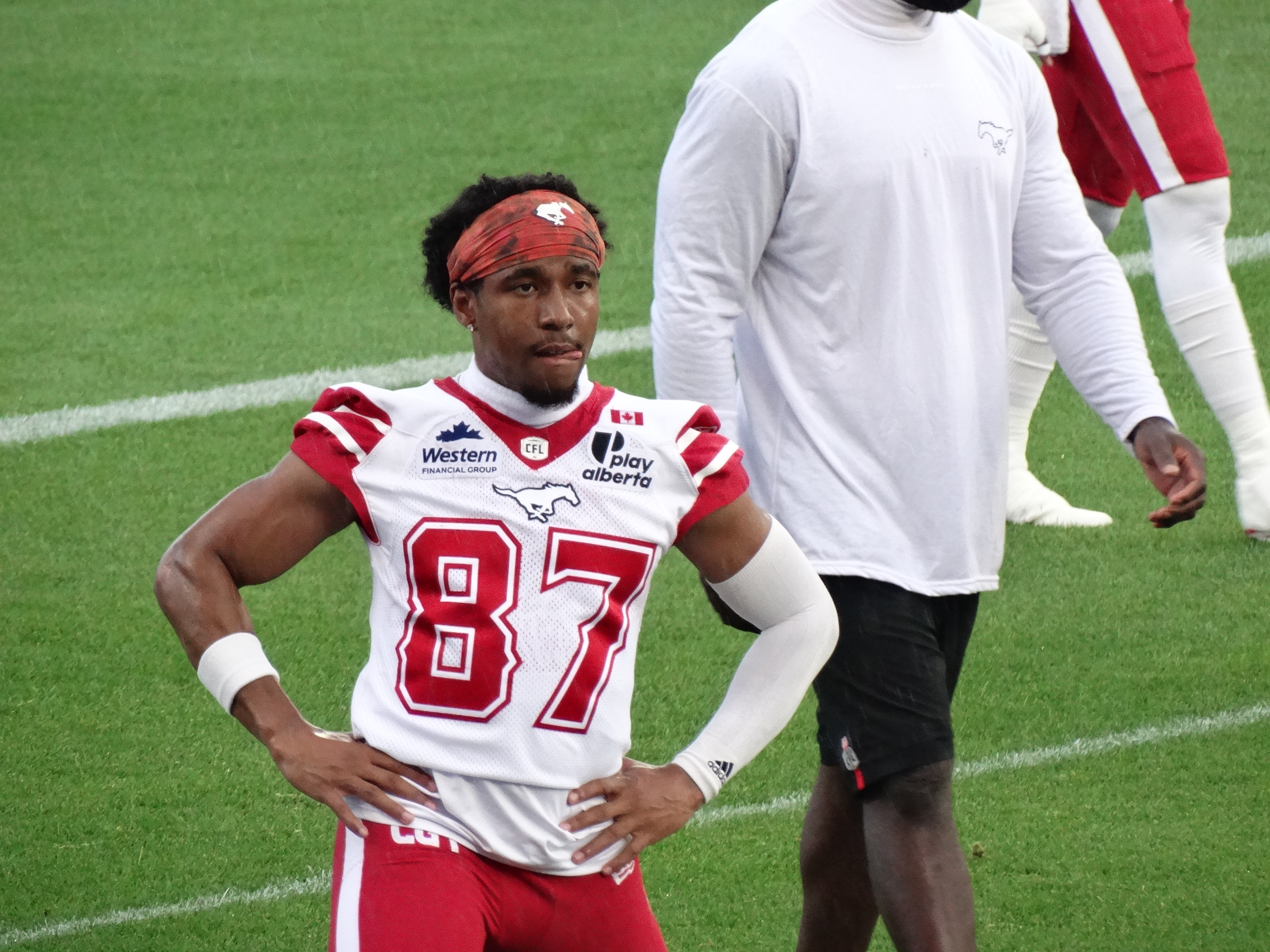
- Brooks with the Calgary Stampeders in 2026

No. 87 – Calgary Stampeders
- Position: Wide receiver
- Roster status: Active
- CFL status: American

Personal information
- Born: June 29, 1999 (age 27); Irvine, California, U.S.
- Listed height: 5 ft 7 in (1.70 m)
- Listed weight: 178 lb (81 kg)

Career information
- High school: Eleanor Roosevelt (Eastvale, California)
- College: Fresno State (2019–2023)

Career history
- Calgary Stampeders (2024–present)

Career CFL statistics as of 2026
- Receptions: 128
- Receiving yards: 1,661
- Receiving average: 13
- Receiving touchdowns: 7
- Stats at CFL.ca

Erik Brooks (born June 29, 1999) is an American professional football wide receiver for the Calgary Stampeders of the Canadian Football League (CFL). Brooks played college football for the Fresno State Bulldogs.

== College career ==
Brooks played college football for Fresno State from 2019 to 2023. He played in 52 games and logged 128 receptions for 1,548 yards and ten touchdowns. Brooks was an Mountain West All-Conference honorable mention in his final season, where he recorded a career best 60 catches, 788 receiving yards and five touchdowns.

=== College statistics ===
Legend
**Bold**	Career high

Season	Team	Games		Receiving			Punt returns				Kick returns			
Season	Team	GP	GS	Rec	Yds	TD	Att	Yards	Avg	TD	Att	Yards	Avg	TD
2019	Fresno State	6	0	1	7	0	0	0	0	0	0	0	0	0
2020	Fresno State	6	1	13	178	0	0	0	0	0	0	0	0	0
2021	Fresno State	13	0	17	184	2	1	-2	-2.0	0	0	0	0	0
2022	Fresno State	**14**	2	37	391	3	0	0	0	0	0	0	0	0
2023	Fresno State	13	**9**	**60**	**788**	**5**	**19**	**174**	**9.2**	0	**1**	**35**	**35.0**	0
Career		52	12	128	1,548	10	20	172	8.6	0	1	35	35.0	0

== Professional career ==
Pre-draft measurables
Height	Weight	Arm length	Hand span	Wingspan	40-yard dash	10-yard split	20-yard split	20-yard shuttle	Three-cone drill	Vertical jump	Broad jump	Bench press
5 ft 6 1/2 in (1.69 m)	169 lb (77 kg)	29 3/4 in (0.76 m)	8 7/8 in (0.23 m)	6 ft 0 1/8 in (1.83 m)	4.53 s	1.62 s	2.56 s	4.28 s	7.21 s	36.0 in (0.91 m)	9 ft 10 in (3.00 m)	11 reps
All values from Pro Day

After going undrafted in the 2024 NFL Draft, the Calgary Stampeders signed Brooks on May 2, 2024. He made his CFL debut against the Hamilton Tiger-Cats on June 7, recording 164 return yards. Brooks had his season ended early after he suffered a broken arm against the BC Lions. He played in six games and recorded three catches for 53 yards, one touchdown and 580 combined return yards.

== CFL career statistics ==
Legend
**Bold**	Career high

=== Regular season ===
Year	Team	Games		Receiving					Rushing					Punt returns					Kick returns				
Year	Team	GP	GS	Rec	Yds	Avg	Lng	TD	Att	Yds	Avg	Lng	TD	Att	Yards	Avg	Lng	TD	Att	Yards	Avg	Lng	TD
2024	CAL	6	4	3	53	**17.7**	32	1	0	0	0.0	0	0	17	166	9.8	33	0	13	287	**22.1**	35	0
2025	CAL	**18**	**15**	**51**	**824**	16.2	**74**	**2**	**2**	**9**	**4.5**	**7**	0	**33**	**335**	**10.2**	**86**	**1**	**31**	**665**	21.5	**44**	0
Career		25	19	54	877	16.2	74	3	2	9	4.5	7	0	50	501	10.0	86	1	44	952	21.6	44	0

=== Postseason ===
Year	Team	Games		Receiving					Punt returns					Kick returns				
Year	Team	GP	GS	Rec	Yds	Avg	Lng	TD	Att	Yards	Avg	Lng	TD	Att	Yards	Avg	Lng	TD
2025	CAL	1	0	3	27	9.0	11	0	5	34	6.8	14	0	5	117	23.4	25	0
Career		1	0	3	27	9.0	11	0	5	34	6.8	14	0	5	117	23.4	25	0
