= Maximilian Mang =

German-American gridiron football player (born 2000)

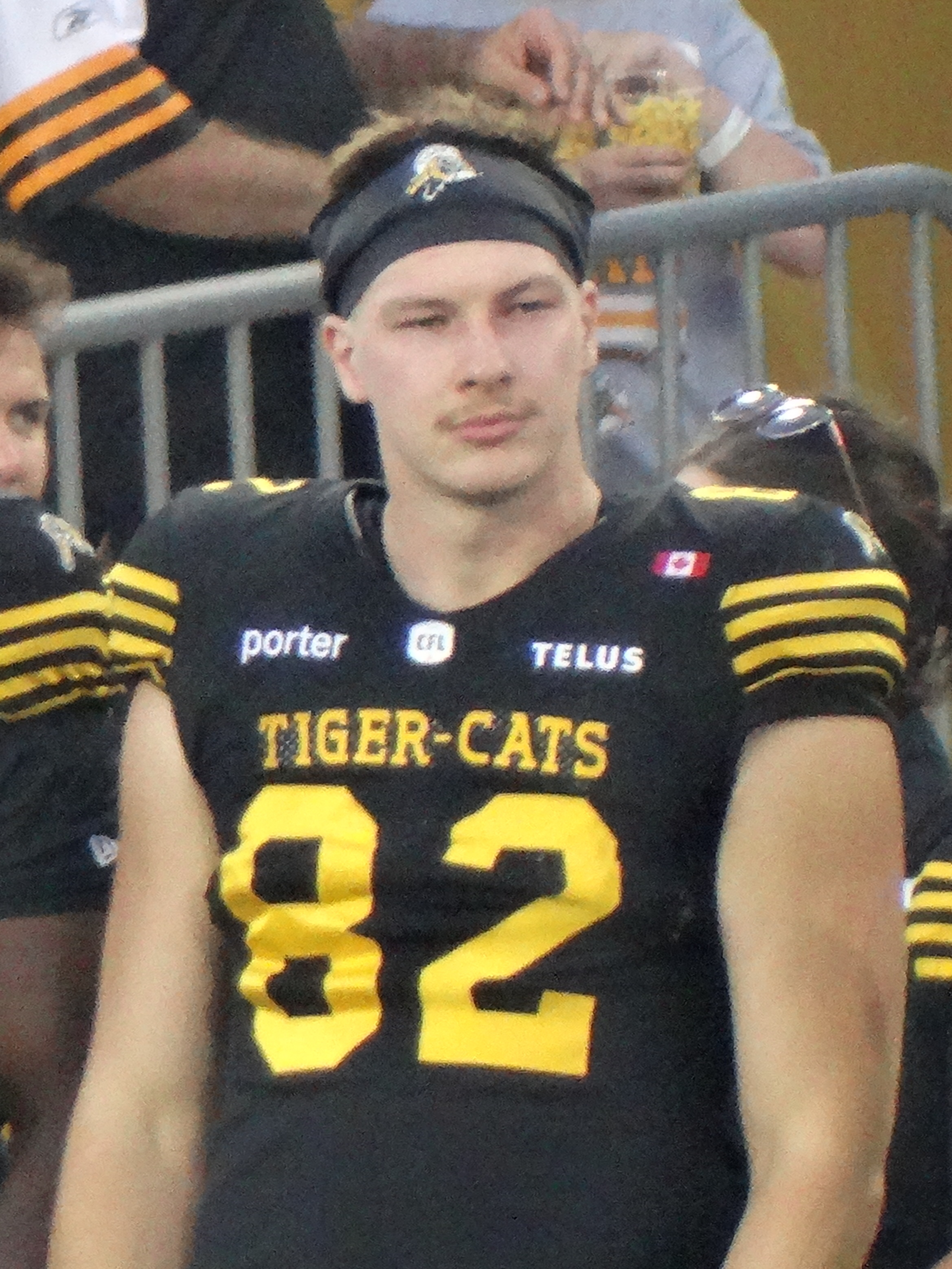
- Mang with the Hamilton Tiger-Cats in 2026

No. 82 – Hamilton Tiger-Cats
- Position: Tight end
- Roster status: Active
- CFL status: Global

Personal information
- Born: March 13, 2000 (age 26); Potsdam, Germany
- Listed height: 6 ft 6 in (1.98 m)
- Listed weight: 267 lb (121 kg)

Career information
- College: Syracuse (2020–2024)
- NFL draft: 2025: undrafted
- CFL draft: 2025G: 2nd round, 11th overall pick

Career history
- Potsdam Royals (c. 2016–2018); Berlin Rebels (2018–2019); Indianapolis Colts (2025)*; New York Giants (2025)*; Hamilton Tiger-Cats (2026–present)
- * Offseason or practice squad member only
- Stats at Pro Football Reference

Maximilian Mang (born March 13, 2000) is a German professional gridiron football tight end for the Hamilton Tiger-Cats of the Canadian Football League (CFL). He played college football for the Syracuse Orange and was signed by the Indianapolis Colts of the National Football League (NFL) as an undrafted free agent in 2025.

== Early life ==
Mang was born on March 13, 2000, in Potsdam, Germany. He grew up playing soccer, then switched to table tennis from ages seven to 10, and then began playing volleyball. He was a top player for his volleyball club, helping them reach the quarterfinals of the under-14 national championships, and was selected for the extended youth national team. He became interested in American football after watching Super Bowl XLVIII between the Seattle Seahawks and Denver Broncos. At around age 16, he joined the Potsdam Royals of the German Football League (GFL) as a wide receiver. During the 2018 season, he moved to the Berlin Rebels and began playing as a tight end and defensive end.

== College career ==
While playing in the GFL, Mang was noticed by Brandon Collier's PPI organization, designed to get European players opportunities in college football. He attended various camps in the U.S. and was offered a scholarship by the Penn State Nittany Lions in 2019, but was not able to join due to issues in filing paperwork to be eligible. The following year, he received an offer from the Syracuse Orange and signed to play for them as part of the 2020 recruiting class.

Mang appeared in all 11 games as a freshman at Syracuse in 2020, being used on special teams. He played in all 12 games in 2021, five as a starter, and had one reception for 12 yards. He had his most productive season as a sophomore in 2022, catching five passes for 31 yards. He started three games in 2023 and two games in 2024, catching two passes for 12 yards in 2023 and one pass for five yards in 2024. Mainly used as a blocking tight end at Syracuse, he finished his collegiate career having appeared in all but one game and caught nine passes for 60 yards.

== Professional career ==
Pre-draft measurables
| Height | Weight | Arm length | Hand span | Wingspan | 40-yard dash | 10-yard split | 20-yard split | 20-yard shuttle | Three-cone drill | Vertical jump | Broad jump | Bench press |
|---|---|---|---|---|---|---|---|---|---|---|---|---|
| 6 ft 6 1/2 in (1.99 m) | 263 lb (119 kg) | 33 1/4 in (0.84 m) | 11 1/8 in (0.28 m) | 6 ft 9 1/4 in (2.06 m) | 5.00 s | 1.75 s | 2.85 s | 4.52 s | 7.31 s | 33.5 in (0.85 m) | 9 ft 7 in (2.92 m) | 20 reps |
All values from Pro Day

=== Indianapolis Colts ===
After going unselected in the 2025 NFL draft, Mang signed with the Indianapolis Colts as an undrafted free agent. He was designated the team's exempt/international player as part of the International Player Pathway (IPP) program. He was also selected by the Hamilton Tiger-Cats in the second round (11th overall) of the 2025 CFL global draft. He was waived by the Colts on August 25, 2025, and re-signed to the practice squad two days later. Mang was released on November 18.

=== New York Giants ===
On November 24, 2025, Mang signed with the New York Giants' practice squad.

=== Hamilton Tiger-Cats ===
On April 30, 2026, Mang signed with the Hamilton Tiger-Cats of the Canadian Football League (CFL).
