= Mark McNamee =

Irish football player (born 1999)

No. 70 – BC Lions
- Position: Kicker
- Roster status: Active
- CFL status: Global

Personal information
- Born: 11 October 1999 (age 27); County Dublin, Ireland
- Listed height: 6 ft 4 in (1.93 m)
- Listed weight: 210 lb (95 kg)

Career information
- College: None
- NFL draft: 2025: undrafted
- CFL draft: 2025G: 2nd round, 13th overall pick

Career history
- BC Lions (2025)*; Green Bay Packers (2025)*; BC Lions (2026–present)
- * Offseason or practice squad member only
- Stats at Pro Football Reference

Mark McNamee (born 11 October 1999) is an Irish professional gridiron football kicker for the BC Lions of the Canadian Football League (CFL). He was previously a member of the Green Bay Packers as part of the National Football League (NFL)'s International Player Pathway program.

== Career ==
From County Dublin, McNamee received a Higher Certificate in business from Technological University Dublin while playing as a goalkeeper in Gaelic football for Ballyboden St Enda's in Dublin. He worked in software sales while continuing to play Gaelic football.

A longtime watcher of NFL games on Sky Sports, McNamee became interested in playing American football in 2023 at the age of 24. No longer eligible for college football, he worked with Irish rugby player and former gridiron football kicker Tadhg Leader, employed by NFL UK to find international kicking prospects. In February 2025, he was announced as joining the NFL's International Player Pathway (IPP) scheme. That month, he participated in the NFL Combine where he was successful in 13 out of 14 of his field goal attempts.

=== BC Lions (first stint) ===
In April 2025, McNamee went undrafted in the 2025 NFL draft but was drafted in the second round by the BC Lions in the 2025 CFL global draft. He was signed by the Lions on 5 May 2025. McNamee featured in both preseason games for the Lions, successfully converting his one field goal attempt in each game from 32 yards versus the Calgary Stampeders and 42 yards against the Edmonton Elks. He was released on 1 June 2025, but told that the team might re-sign him in September.

=== Green Bay Packers ===
McNamee was planning to attend John Carney's kicking clinic in San Diego when the Green Bay Packers's Alex Hale was injured. On 22 July 2025, McNamee signed with the Packers, replacing Hale as the team's IPP roster exemption. The team cut McNamee from the final 53-man roster on 26 August, but signed him to the practice squad on 27 August. On 14 October, McNamee was released from the practice squad.

=== BC Lions (second stint) ===
On December 11, 2025, McNamee re-signed with the Lions. He saw game time in both pre-season matches against the Edmonton Elks and the Winnipeg Blue Bombers, finishing perfect on his four field goal attempts and two converts over the two games. On June 12, 2026, McNamee was placed on the Lions' 6-game injured list where he remained for the entire 2026 CFL season.
