= Ross Bolger =

Irish gridiron football player (born 2001)

Profile
- Positions: Kicker, punter

Personal information
- Born: 25 April 2001 (age 25); Laois, Ireland
- Listed height: 5 ft 11 in (1.80 m)
- Listed weight: 207 lb (94 kg)

Career information
- College: Dublin City; Idaho State (2023–2024)
- CFL draft: 2025G: 1st round, 4th overall pick

Career history
- BC Lions (2025)*
- * Offseason or practice squad member only
- Stats at CFL.ca

Ross Bolger (born 25 April 2001) is an Irish professional Canadian football kicker and punter who is currently a free agent. Previously a Gaelic footballer, he played college football for the Idaho State Bengals. In February 2025, he was announced as having joined the NFL's International Player Pathway scheme. He was later selected by the Lions in the 2025 CFL global draft.

== Early life ==
He is from Killeshin in County Laois. He completed his undergraduate degree at Dublin City University and a Master's degree in Communications from Idaho State University, in the United States.

== Amateur career ==
He was a Laois under-20 Gaelic football player who was also previously a rugby union player for Carlow RFC. Bolger took a two-year scholarship with NCAA Division I American football university team Idaho State Bengals in 2023, where he played as both a kicker and a punter.

== Professional career ==
Pre-draft measurables
| Height | Weight |
|---|---|
| 5 ft 11 1/8 in (1.81 m) | 207 lb (94 kg) |
Values from Pro Day

In February 2025, Bolger was announced as joining the NFL's International Player Pathway scheme. That month, he participated in the NFL Combine.

In April 2025, Bolger went undrafted in the 2025 NFL draft but was drafted in the 1st round (4th overall) by the BC Lions of the Canadian Football League in the 2025 CFL global draft. He signed with the Lions on 5 May 2025. On 1 June 2025, Bolger was assigned to the Lions' practice squad to start the 2025 CFL season, and remained there for entirety of the season. On November 20, 2025, Bolger re-signed with the Lions. On February 4, 2026, Bolger was released by the Lions.

== Personal life ==
Bolger is the son of former-Leinster GAA chairman, 2020 GAA presidential candidate, and Carlow chairman Jim Bolger.
