= Owen Hubert =

Canadian football player (born 2000)

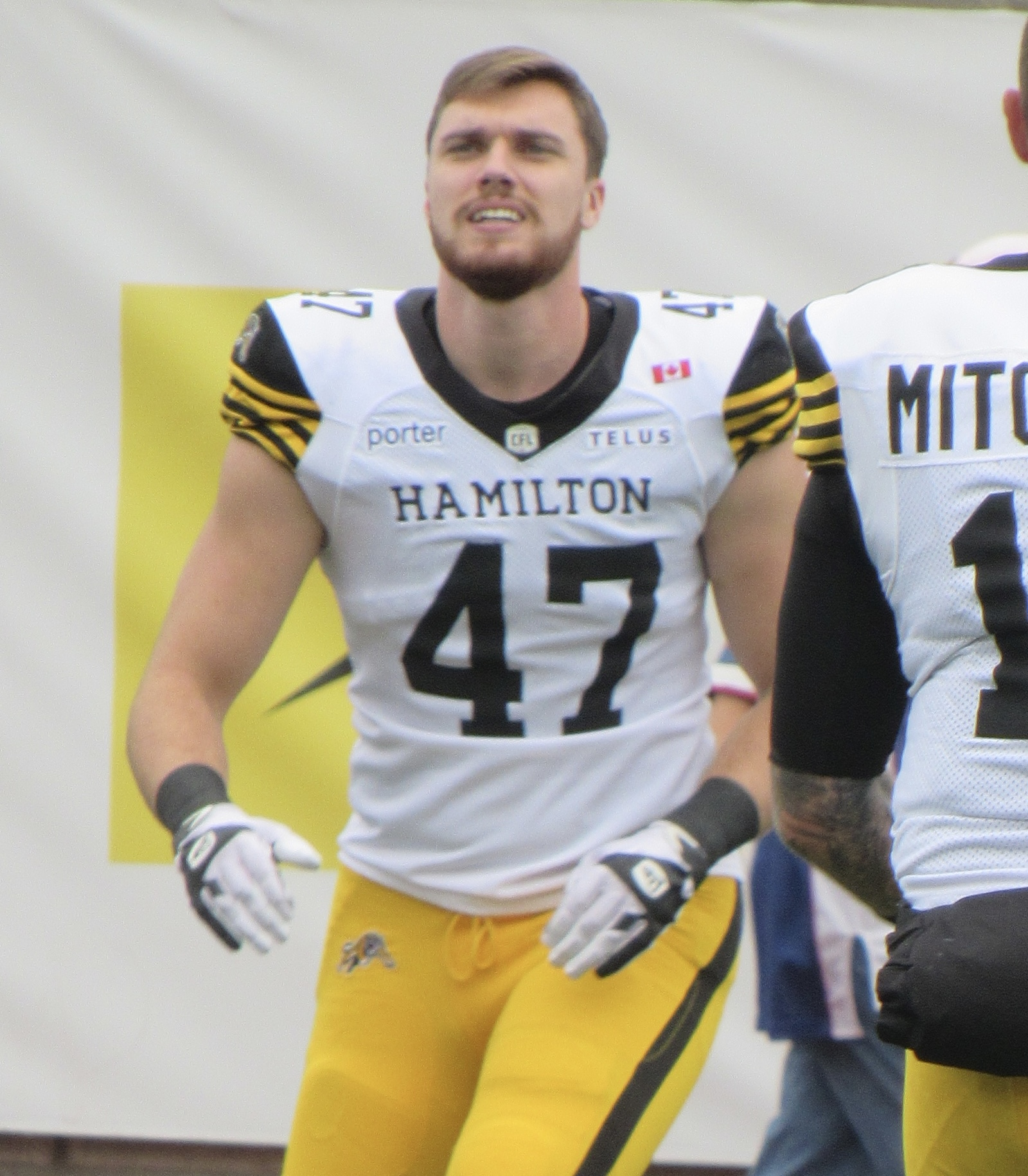
- Hubert with the Hamilton Tiger-Cats in 2025

No. 47 – Hamilton Tiger-Cats
- Position: Defensive end
- Roster status: Active
- CFL status: National

Personal information
- Born: March 1, 2000 (age 26); Champaign, Illinois, U.S.
- Listed height: 6 ft 4 in (1.93 m)
- Listed weight: 263 lb (119 kg)

Career information
- University: McMaster
- CFL draft: 2024: 8th round, 73rd overall pick

Career history
- 2024: Winnipeg Blue Bombers
- 2025–present: Hamilton Tiger-Cats
- Stats at CFL.ca

Owen Hubert (born March 1, 2000) is a Canadian-American professional football defensive end for the Hamilton Tiger-Cats of the Canadian Football League (CFL). He played U Sports football at McMaster.

== Early life ==
Hubert was born in Champaign, Illinois. He and his family moved to Ontario when he was six years old, after his father received a job offer from the Canadian government. He started playing football when he was 15 after previously having placed soccer.

== University career ==
Hubert played U Sports football at McMaster from 2019 to 2023. The 2020 season was cancelled due to the COVID-19 pandemic. He recorded five sacks during his final season in 2023.

== Professional career ==
Pre-draft measurables
Height	Weight	40-yard dash	20-yard shuttle	Three-cone drill	Vertical jump	Broad jump	Bench press
6 ft 3 7/8 in (1.93 m)	263 lb (119 kg)	5.03 s	4.78 s	7.70 s	30.0 in (0.76 m)	9 ft 4 1/2 in (2.86 m)	10 reps
All values from CFL Combine

Hubert was selected by the Winnipeg Blue Bombers of the Canadian Football League (CFL) in the eight round, with the second-to-last pick (73th overall), of the 2024 CFL draft. He officially signed with the team on May 6. He was moved to the practice roster on June 2, and promoted to the active roster on June 17. Hubert dressed in ten games for the Blue Bombers during the 2024 season and posted eight defensive tackles.

Hubert signed with the Hamilton Tiger-Cats on January 9, 2025.

== Personal life ==
Hubert's brother Silas also plays in the CFL.
