= Mark Kilam =

Canadian gridiron football coach (born 1979)

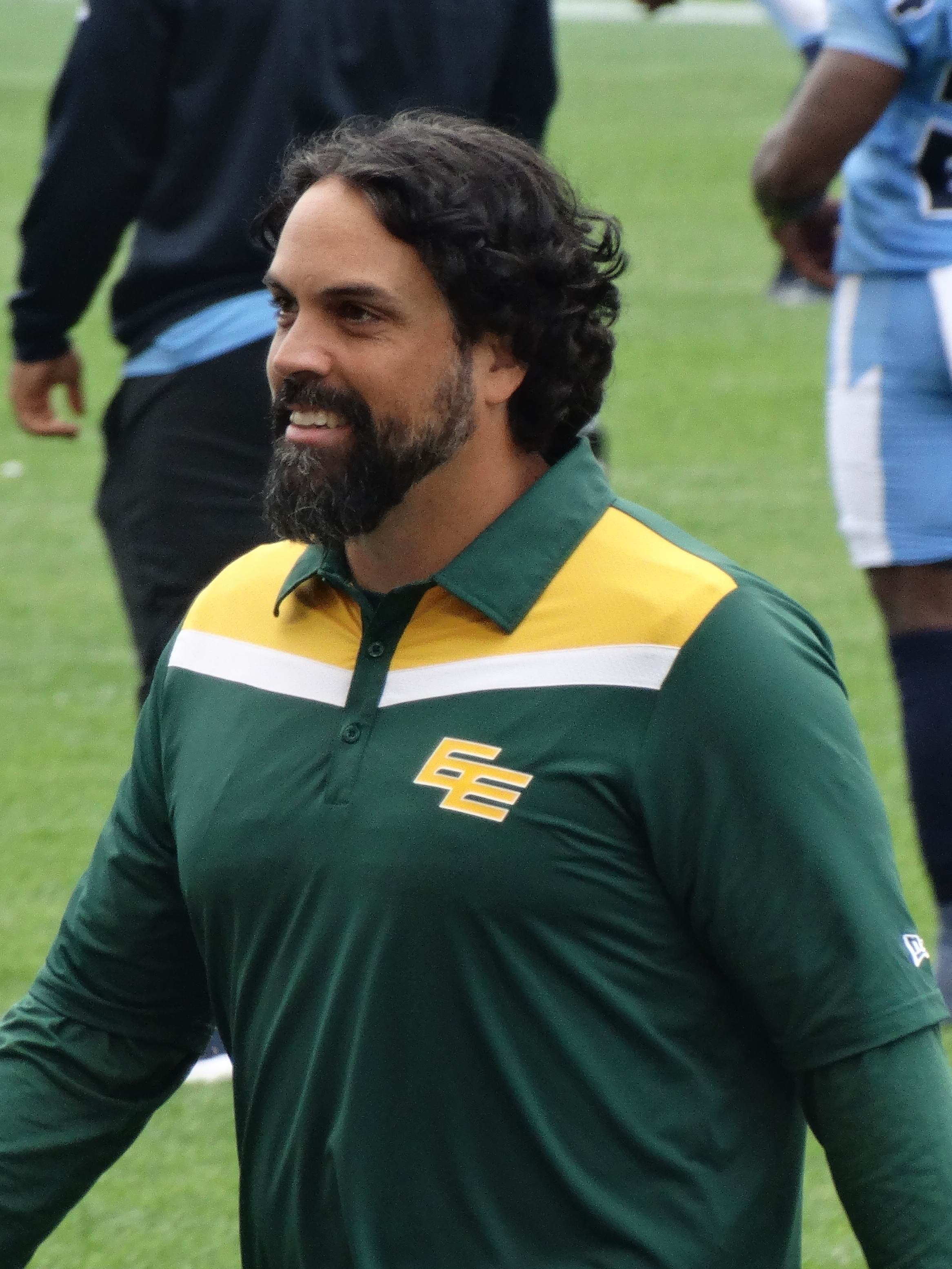
- Kilam with the Edmonton Elks in 2025

Edmonton Elks
- Title: Head coach

Personal information
- Born: April 22, 1979 (age 47); Edmonton, Alberta, Canada

Career information
- Position: Linebacker
- High school: Lethbridge Collegiate
- University: Alberta (1997–2001)

Career history
- 2002–2005: Cochrane HS (Defensive assistant coach)
- 2005–2009: Calgary Stampeders (Strength and conditioning coach)
- 2005–2006: Calgary Stampeders (Defensive assistant)
- 2007–2009: Calgary Stampeders (Linebackers coach)
- 2010–2024: Calgary Stampeders (Special teams coordinator)
- 2019–2024: Calgary Stampeders (Assistant head coach)
- 2025–present: Edmonton Elks (Head coach)

Awards and highlights
- 4× Grey Cup champion (2008, 2014, 2018, 2026)

Mark Kilam (born April 22, 1979) is a Canadian professional football coach who is the head coach of the Edmonton Elks of the Canadian Football League (CFL). He is a four-time Grey Cup champion, winning three as an assistant coach with the Calgary Stampeders, having won in 2008, 2014, and 2018, and winning one as head coach of the Edmonton Elks in 2026.

== Early life ==
Kilam was born to parents Surender and Jan, both of whom are doctors. He grew up in Lethbridge, Alberta, where he attended Lethbridge Collegiate Institute.

== University career ==
Kilam played CIAU football as a linebacker for the Alberta Golden Bears from 1997 to 2001.

== Coaching career ==
=== Early career ===
Kilam began his coaching career as a defensive assistant coach for the Cochrane High School Cobras from 2002 to 2005 where the team won three provincial high school championships. He also coached for the Southern Alberta All-Star Team in the Provincial Senior Bowl from 2003 to 2005.

=== Calgary Stampeders ===
Kilam was hired by the Calgary Stampeders for the 2005 season as the strength and conditioning coach. In 2006, he also added the title of defensive quality control coach. In the following season, he was promoted to linebackers coach and served in that capacity for three years. He won his first Grey Cup championship when the Stampeders defeated the Montreal Alouettes in the 96th Grey Cup game in 2008.

On December 8, 2009, Kilam was promoted to special teams coordinator for the Stampeders. He won his first Grey Cup as a coordinator following the team's 102nd Grey Cup victory over the Hamilton Tiger-Cats in 2014. He won his third Grey Cup when the Stampeders won the 106th Grey Cup in 2018. In 2019, Kilam was given the title of assistant head coach, in addition to his special teams duties.

On October 30, 2024, after the Stampeders missed the playoffs for the first time since 2004, the team announced that they were not retaining Kilam for the 2025 season.

=== Edmonton Elks ===
On November 30, 2024, it was first reported that Kilam had accepted the position of head coach of the Edmonton Elks. On December 2, 2024, it was officially announced by the Elks that he had been named the 25th head coach in franchise history. After a 1–6 start, the Elks finished the 2025 season with a 7–11 record and in fifth place as they failed to qualify for the playoffs.

On October 28, 2026, the Elks signed Kilam to a contract extension to keep him as head coach through the 2029 season.

=== CFL coaching record ===
Team	Year	Regular season					Postseason		
Team	Year	Won	Lost	Ties	Win %	Finish	Won	Lost	Result
EDM	2025	7	11	0	.389	5th in West Division	–	–	Failed to qualify
EDM	2026	13	5	0	.722	1st in West Division	2	0	Won Grey Cup
Total		20	16	0	.556	1 Division Championship	2	0	

== Personal life ==
Kilam and his wife, Andrea, have two daughters. He was on the board of directors for the Lethbridge Vipers in their failed bid to join the Canadian Junior Football League.
