= James Burnip =

Australian gridiron football player (born 2001)

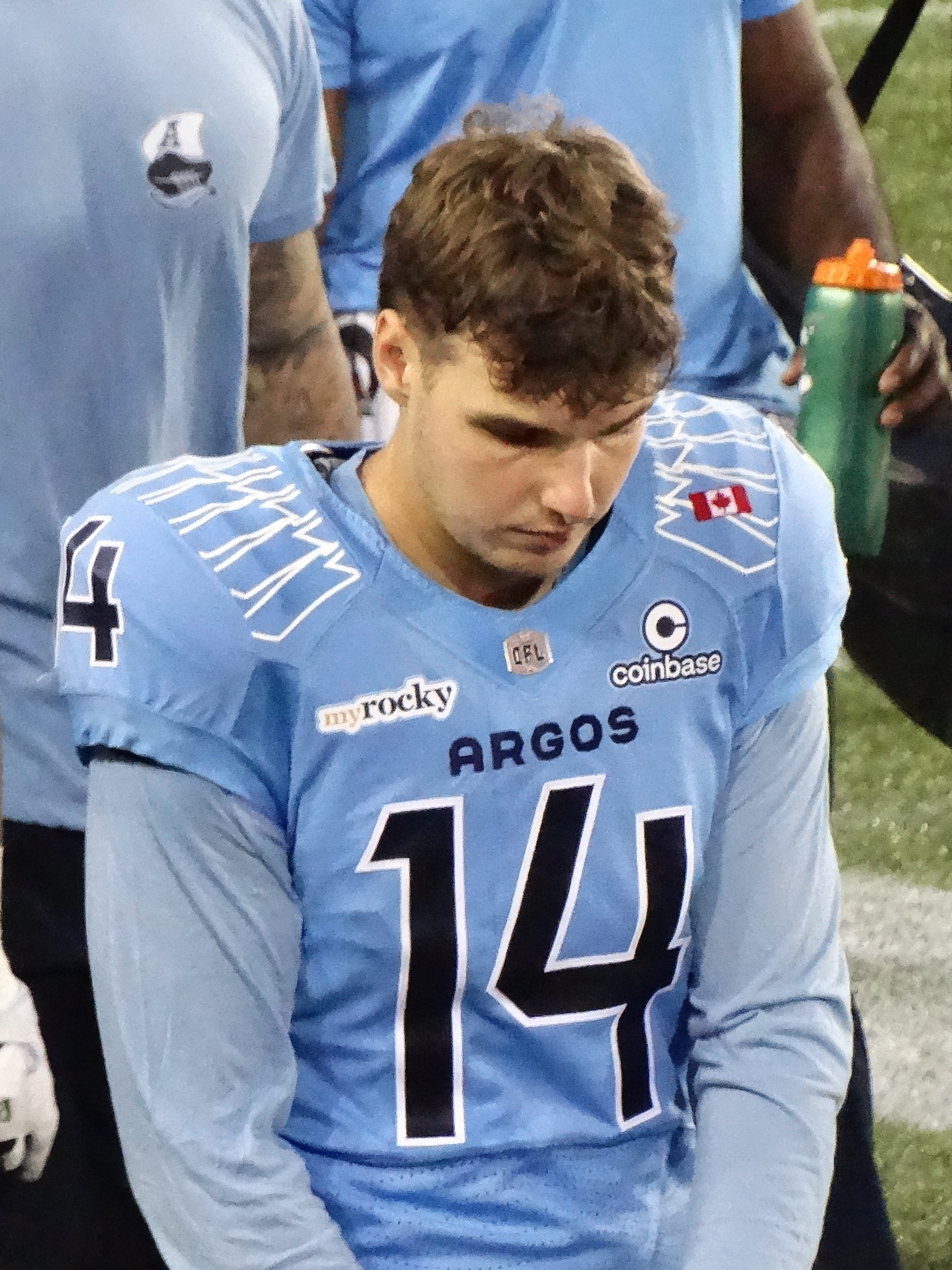
- Burnip with the Toronto Argonauts in 2026

No. 14 – Toronto Argonauts
- Position: Punter
- Roster status: Active
- CFL status: Global

Personal information
- Born: 20 February 2001 (age 25); Mount Macedon, Victoria, Australia
- Listed height: 6 ft 6 in (1.98 m)
- Listed weight: 235 lb (107 kg)

Career information
- High school: Victoria (Melbourne)
- College: Alabama (2021–2024)
- NFL draft: 2025: undrafted
- CFL draft: 2025G: 2nd round, 14th overall pick

Career history
- New Orleans Saints (2025)*; Ottawa Redblacks (2026)*; Toronto Argonauts (2026–present)
- * Offseason or practice squad member only

Awards and highlights
- CFL East All-Star (2026); First team All-American (2023); Second team All-SEC (2023)
- Stats at Pro Football Reference

James Burnip (born 20 February 2001) is an Australian professional football punter for the Toronto Argonauts of the Canadian Football League (CFL). He played college football for the Alabama Crimson Tide.

== Early life ==
Burnip grew up playing Australian rules football and attended Victoria University. He learned to punt by training with ProKick Australia and initially committed to play for the Ole Miss Rebels. However, Burnip later flipped his commitment to play for the Alabama Crimson Tide.

== College career ==
Burnip made his collegiate debut in the 2021 season opener versus Miami. As a freshman in 2021 he punted 48 times with average of 39.1, where 23 resulted in fair catches and 15 landed inside the 20 yard line. In 2022, Burnip punted 44 times with an average of 42.3 yards per punt, with seven landing inside the 20 and a long of 58 yards. In week 2 of the 2023 season, he was named the Ray Guy Punter of the Week in a matchup versus Texas. In the 2024 Rose Bowl, Burnip had seven punts for 352 yards with a 50.3 average and caused two punts to be muffed in a loss to Michigan. In 2023, he punted 59 times with an average of 47.6 yards, earning second-team all-SEC honors.

Burnip accepted an invite to play in the 2025 Senior Bowl.

== Professional career ==
Pre-draft measurables
Height	Weight	Arm length	Hand span	Wingspan
6 ft 6 3/8 in (1.99 m)	235 lb (107 kg)	31 7/8 in (0.81 m)	8 5/8 in (0.22 m)	6 ft 5 7/8 in (1.98 m)
All values from NFL Combine

=== New Orleans Saints ===
After going undrafted in the 2025 NFL draft, Burnip signed with the New Orleans Saints as an undrafted free agent. He was waived by the Saints on August 25.

=== Ottawa Redblacks ===
Burnip was drafted by the Ottawa Redblacks of the Canadian Football League in the second round (14th overall) of the 2025 CFL global draft. On 30 January 2026, it was announced that he had signed with the Redblacks. He spent the first five games of the 2026 season on the practice roster.

=== Toronto Argonauts ===
On 12 July 2026, it was announced that Burnip had been traded to the Toronto Argonauts. Following an injury to the incumbent, John Hagerty, Burnip made his professional debut on 18 July, against the Hamilton Tiger-Cats where he had four punts for an average of 53.5 yards.
