= Quincy Vaughn =

Canadian gridiron football player (born 2001)

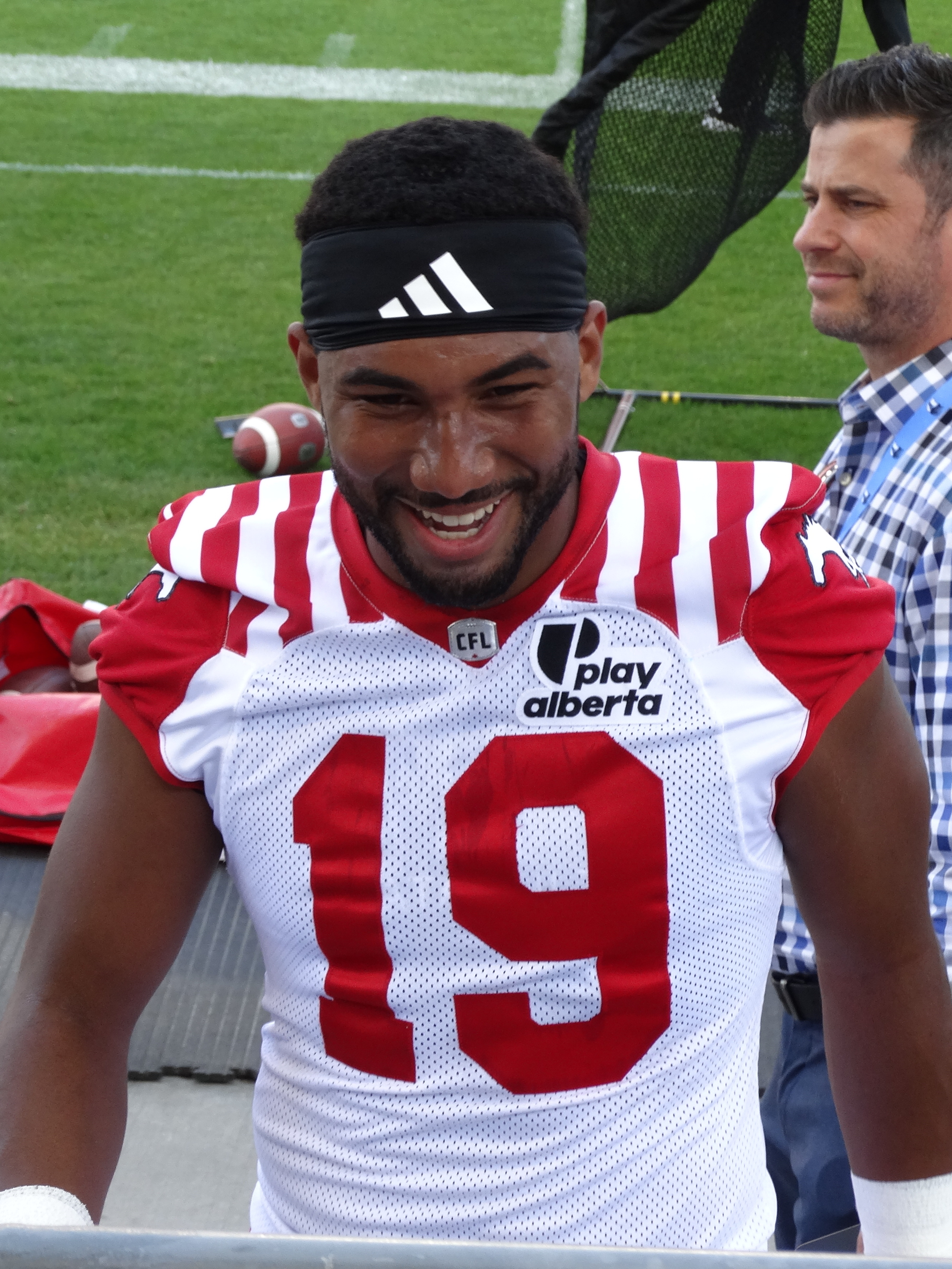
- Vaughn with the Calgary Stampeders in 2025

No. 19 – Calgary Stampeders
- Position: Quarterback
- Roster status: Active
- CFL status: National

Personal information
- Born: July 5, 2001 (age 25); Brantford, Ontario, Canada
- Listed height: 6 ft 4 in (1.93 m)
- Listed weight: 253 lb (115 kg)

Career information
- High school: Sir Allan MacNab Secondary School, Clarkson Football North
- College: North Dakota (2020–2024)
- CFL draft: 2025: 2nd round, 17th overall pick

Career history
- 2025–present: Calgary Stampeders

Career CFL statistics as of 2026
- Games played: 36
- Passing completions: 1
- Passing attempts: 1
- Passing yards: 5
- TD-INT: 0-0
- Rushing yards: 152
- Rushing touchdowns: 20
- Stats at CFL.ca

Quincy Vaughn (born July 5, 2001) is a Canadian professional football quarterback for the Calgary Stampeders of the Canadian Football League (CFL).

== College career ==
Vaughn played college football for the North Dakota Fighting Hawks from 2020 to 2024. He initially played as the team's backup quarterback where he completed eight of 11 pass attempts for 92 yards and four touchdowns in three years. In 2023, he changed positions to tight end where he had 21 receptions for 197 yards and four touchdowns. Throughout his college career, he played in 54 games where he also managed the short yardage team, recording 121 rush attempts for 327 yards and 17 touchdowns.

== Professional career ==
Pre-draft measurables
| Height | Weight | 40-yard dash | 20-yard shuttle | Three-cone drill | Vertical jump | Broad jump | Bench press |
|---|---|---|---|---|---|---|---|
| 6 ft 4 1/4 in (1.94 m) | 251 lb (114 kg) | 5.03 s | 4.26 s | 7.02 s | 29.5 in (0.75 m) | 9 ft 3 in (2.82 m) | 8 reps |
All values from CFL Combine

Vaughn was drafted in the second round, 19th overall, by the Calgary Stampeders in the 2025 CFL draft and signed with the team on May 5, 2025. Following training camp in 2025, he made the team's active roster as the third-string quarterback and dressed in his first professional game on June 7, 2025, against the Hamilton Tiger-Cats. In the third game of the season, he began operating the short yardage unit and had two carries for five yards.

== Personal life ==
Vaughn's father, Michael, played as a running back for the Hamilton Tiger-Cats in 1989 and Vaughn's brother, Justin, also played for the Tiger-Cats, but as a defensive lineman, from 2017 to 2018.
