= Skyler Griffith =

Canadian gridiron football player (born 2003)

No. 44 – Edmonton Elks
- Position: Fullback
- Roster status: Active
- CFL status: National

Personal information
- Born: January 6, 2003 (age 23); Winnipeg, Manitoba, Canada
- Listed height: 6 ft 3 in (1.91 m)
- Listed weight: 225 lb (102 kg)

Career information
- High school: St. Paul's (Winnipeg)
- University: UBC (2021–2024)
- CFL draft: 2025: 3rd round, 22nd overall pick

Career history
- Edmonton Elks (2025–present)

Awards and highlights
- Grey Cup champion (2026); CFL West All-Star (2026); Second-team All-Canadian (2023)
- Stats at CFL.ca

Skyler Griffith (born January 6, 2003) is a Canadian professional football fullback for the Edmonton Elks of the Canadian Football League (CFL). He played U Sports football for the UBC Thunderbirds.

== U Sports career ==
Griffith played U Sports football for the UBC Thunderbirds from 2021 to 2024, appearing in 23 games. He played multiple positions on offence, including tight end, and was used primarily as a blocker and special teams player, recording 25 special teams tackles in 12 games during his college career. His college career was affected by a torn ACL, MCL, and meniscus, which limited his usage as a runner.

== Professional career ==
Griffith was selected in the third round with the 22nd overall pick in the 2025 CFL draft by the Edmonton Elks, one of two UBC Thunderbirds selected by Edmonton in the third round alongside running back Isaiah Knight. He officially signed with the team on May 7, 2025.

Griffith missed the entire 2025 season while recovering from the ACL, MCL, and meniscus injuries sustained at UBC. He made his CFL debut during the 2026 season, working primarily as a blocking fullback and tight end for Edmonton.
