= Josiah Coatney =

American football player (born 1996)

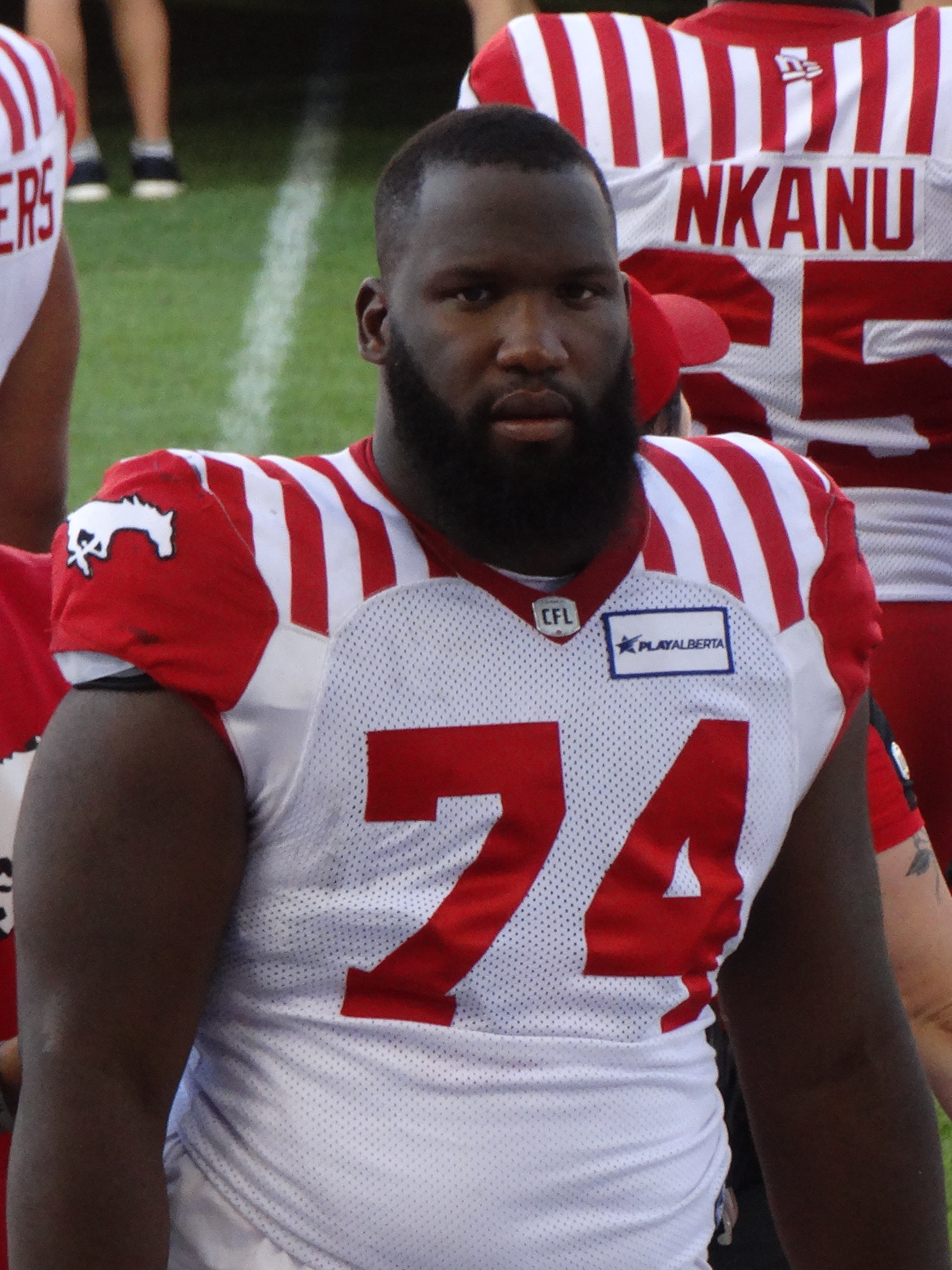
- Coatney with the Calgary Stampeders in 2024

Profile
- Position: Defensive tackle

Personal information
- Born: January 4, 1996 (age 30); Douglasville, Georgia, U.S.
- Listed height: 6 ft 4 in (1.93 m)
- Listed weight: 325 lb (147 kg)

Career information
- College: Ole Miss
- NFL draft: 2020: undrafted

Career history
- Pittsburgh Steelers (2020)*; San Francisco 49ers (2020); Arlington Renegades (2023); Calgary Stampeders (2024–2025)
- * Offseason or practice squad member only

Awards and highlights
- XFL champion (2023)

Career NFL statistics
- Games played: 1
- Stats at Pro Football Reference

Josiah Coatney (born January 4, 1996) is an American professional football defensive tackle. He most recently played for the Calgary Stampeders of the Canadian Football League (CFL). After playing college football for the Ole Miss Rebels, he signed with the Pittsburgh Steelers as an undrafted free agent in 2020. He also played for the San Francisco 49ers.

== Professional career ==
=== Pittsburgh Steelers ===
Coatney signed with the Pittsburgh Steelers as an undrafted free agent following the 2020 NFL draft on April 25, 2020. He was waived on August 2, 2020.

=== San Francisco 49ers ===
Coatney signed with the San Francisco 49ers' practice squad on October 7, 2020. He was released on October 28, and re-signed to the practice squad on November 5. He was elevated to the active roster on January 2, 2021, for the team's week 17 game against the Seattle Seahawks, and reverted to the practice squad after the game. He signed a reserve/future contract with the 49ers after the season on January 4, 2021. He was waived on April 27, 2021.

=== Arlington Renegades ===
On November 17, 2022, Coatney was drafted by the Arlington Renegades of the XFL. He was not part of the roster after the 2024 UFL dispersal draft on January 15, 2024.

=== Calgary Stampeders ===
On March 7, 2024, Coatney signed with the Calgary Stampeders of the Canadian Football League (CFL). He played in 11 games in 2024 where he had nine defensive tackles, one sack, and two forced fumbles. In the 2025 season, Coatney played in just three games where he recorded six defensive tackles. He finished the season on the practice roster and his contract expired on November 2, 2025.
