= Isaiah Knight =

Canadian gridiron football player (born 2003)

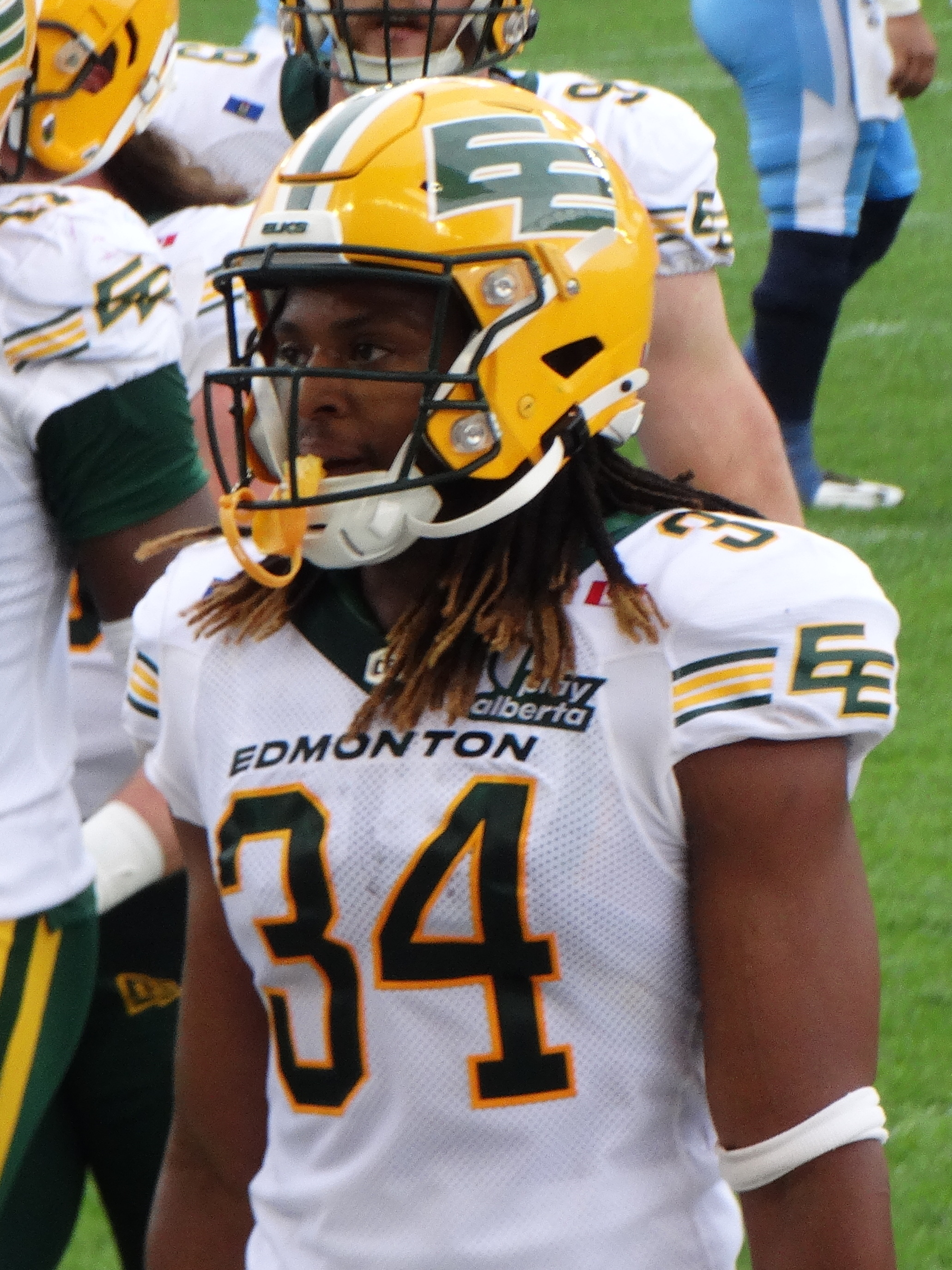
- Knight with the Edmonton Elks in 2025

No. 34 – Edmonton Elks
- Position: Running back
- Roster status: Active
- CFL status: National

Personal information
- Born: June 5, 2003 (age 23); Ottawa, Ontario, Canada
- Listed height: 6 ft 0 in (1.83 m)
- Listed weight: 212 lb (96 kg)

Career information
- High school: Saint James School
- University: UBC Thunderbirds (2021–2024)
- CFL draft: 2025: 3rd round, 22nd overall pick

Career history
- Edmonton Elks (2025–present)

Awards and highlights
- Grey Cup champion (2026); Second-team All-Canadian (2022)

Career CFL statistics as of 2026
- Rushing yards: 12
- Rushing average: 6
- Stats at CFL.ca

Isaiah Knight (born June 5, 2003) is a Canadian professional football running back for the Edmonton Elks of the Canadian Football League (CFL). He played U Sports football for the UBC Thunderbirds.

== U Sports career ==
Knight played U Sports football for the UBC Thunderbirds from 2021 to 2024. He played in 37 games rushing for 3,603 yards, averaging 6.3 yards per carry and 21 touchdowns. Knight also recorded 57 receptions for 609 yards and three touchdowns.

== Professional career ==
Pre-draft measurables
Height	Weight	40-yard dash	20-yard shuttle	Three-cone drill	Vertical jump	Broad jump
5 ft 11 1/2 in (1.82 m)	212 lb (96 kg)	4.82 s	4.19 s	7.25 s	33.5 in (0.85 m)	9 ft 11 1/4 in (3.03 m)
All values from CFL Combine

Knight was selected in the third round with the 24th overall pick in the 2025 CFL draft by the Edmonton Elks. He officially signed with the team on May 7, 2025. Knight was added to the practice roster on June 1, as part of final roster cut downs. He was activated on September 11, 2025 and made his CFL debut on September 13, against the Toronto Argonauts. In the final week of the 2025 season, Knight rushed two times for 12 yards against the Calgary Stampeders.

== Career statistics ==
=== CFL ===
Season	Team	GP	Rushing					Receiving					Kickoff Return			
Season	Team	GP	Att	Yds	Avg	Lng	TD	Rec	Yds	Avg	Lng	TD	Ret	Yds	Avg	TD
2025	Edmonton	6	2	12	6.0	6	0	0	0	0.0	0	0	0	0	0.0	0
Career		6	2	12	6.0	6	0	0	0	0.0	0	0	0	0	0	0

=== University ===
Season	School	GP	Rushing					Receiving					Kickoff Return			
Season	School	GP	Att	Yds	Avg	Lng	TD	Rec	Yds	Avg	Lng	TD	Ret	Yds	Avg	TD
2021	UBC	7	113	701	6.2	60	3	8	72	9.0	29	0	5	78	15.6	0
2022	UBC	11	149	883	5.9	54	3	7	119	17.0	45	2	2	17	8.5	0
2023	UBC	11	173	1,105	6.4	75	6	27	307	11.4	36	1	0	0	0	0
2024	UBC	8	136	914	6.7	76	9	15	111	7.4	30	0	0	0	0	0
Career		37	571	3,603	6.3	76	21	57	609	10.7	45	3	7	95	13.6	0
