= Fraser Masin =

Australian gridiron football player (born 2001)

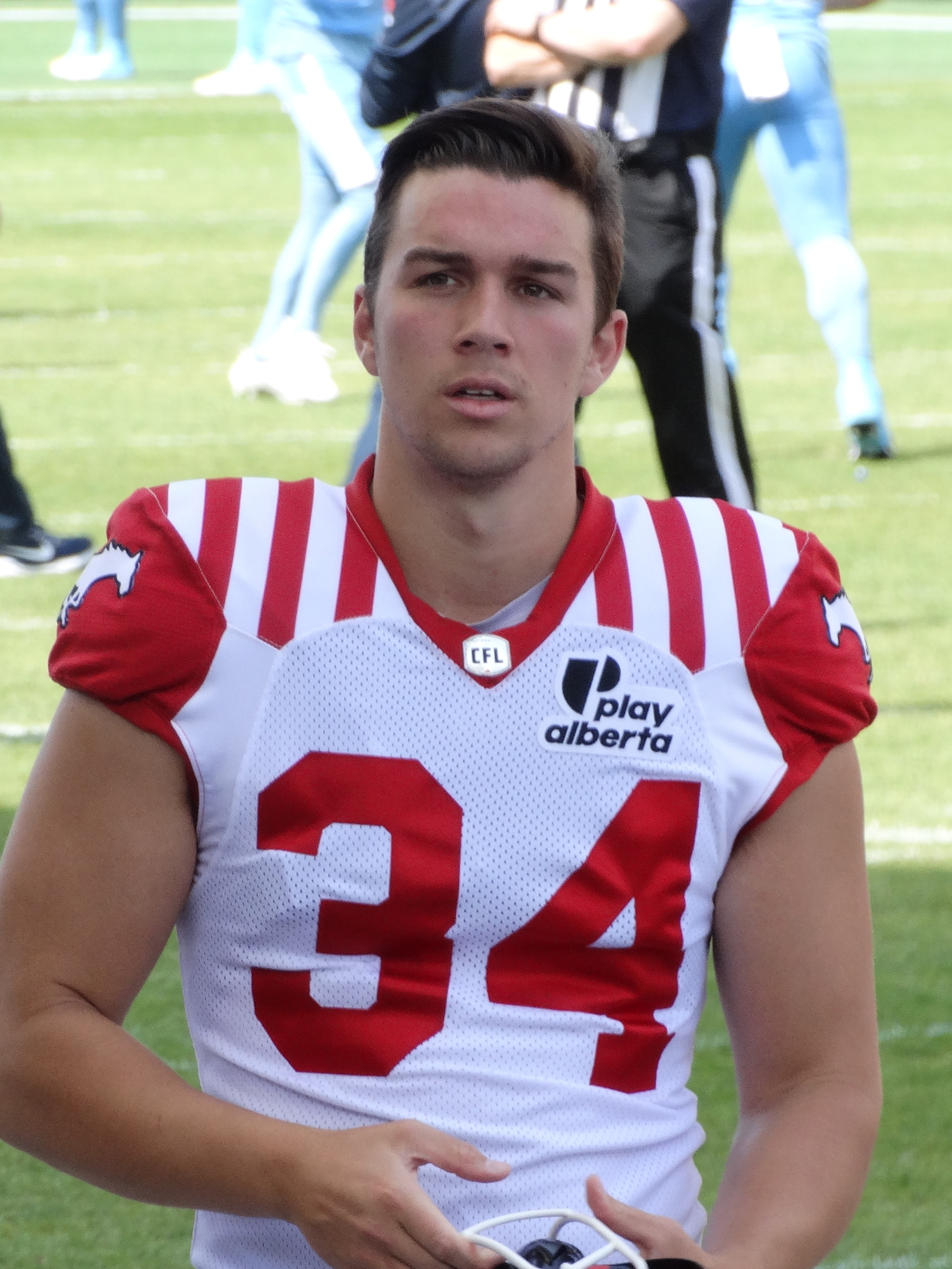
- Masin with the Calgary Stampeders in 2025

Profile
- Position: Punter

Personal information
- Born: 12 September 2001 (age 25); Australia
- Listed height: 6 ft 4 in (1.93 m)
- Listed weight: 230 lb (104 kg)

Career information
- High school: Nudgee (Boondall, Queensland)
- College: Ole Miss
- NFL draft: 2025: undrafted
- CFL draft: 2025G: 1st round, 1st overall pick

Career history
- Calgary Stampeders (2025); Hamilton Tiger-Cats (2026)*
- * Offseason or practice squad member only
- Stats at CFL.ca

Fraser James Masin (born 12 September 2001) is an Australian professional gridiron football punter. He played college football at Ole Miss.

== Early life ==
Fraser James Masin was born on 12 September 2001, in Australia. For high school, he attended St Joseph's College, Nudgee in Boondall, Queensland. He grew up playing Australian rules football, and was named to the state team in 2016 and 2017. Masin also played volleyball and basketball in high school. He became interested in American football after watching The Blind Side.

== College career ==
Masin moved to the United States in 2022 to play college football for the Ole Miss Rebels of the University of Mississippi. At the age of 21, he was classified as a junior for the 2022 season. He played in 12 games in 2022, punting 41 times for 1,727 yards (42.1 average) while also posting one solo tackle and one assisted tackle. Masin played in all 13 games in 2023, punting 48 times for 2,038 yards (42.5 average) while also recording one rushing attempt for 24 yards and one assisted tackle. After the 2023 season, he was granted another year of eligibility by the NCAA. He punted 36 times for 1,676 yards and a 46.6 average as a senior in 2024. Pro Football Focus (PFF) noted that Masin led the Southeastern Conference (SEC) and ranked fourth in the country in individual net punting with an average of 44.4 yards. PFF also ranked him the fifth best punter in the nation with a grade of 82.9. He was named fourth-team All-SEC by Phil Steele for the 2024 season. Masin was also a Ray Guy Award semifinalist. He was named to the SEC Fall Academic Honor Roll each year from 2022 to 2024. He graduated from Ole Miss in December 2023 with a bachelor’s in multi-disciplinary studies.

== Professional career ==
=== Calgary Stampeders ===
On 29 April 2025, Masin was selected by the Calgary Stampeders with the first overall pick of the 2025 CFL global draft. He attended rookie minicamp on a tryout basis with the Pittsburgh Steelers in May 2025 but was not signed. He then officially signed with the Stampeders on 14 May 2025. He played in five regular season games where he had 27 punts with a 46.0-yard average. He finished the season on the practice roster and his contract expired on 2 November 2025.

=== Hamilton Tiger-Cats ===
On 10 February 2026, it was announced that Masin had signed a two-year contract with the Hamilton Tiger-Cats. He was released on 14 May 2026.
