= Leonard Johnson (defensive back, born 1998) =

American gridiron football player (born 1998)

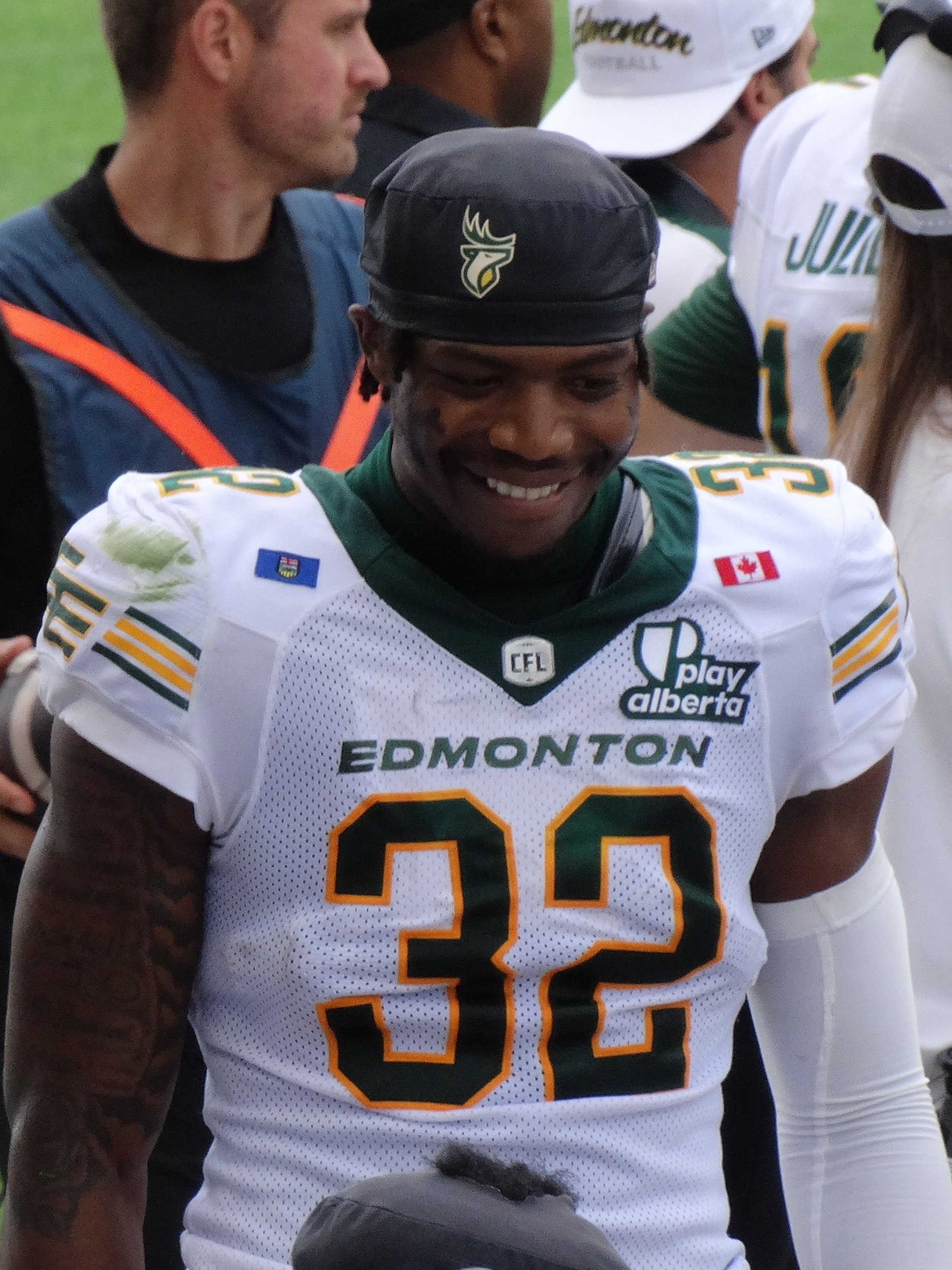
- Johnson with the Edmonton Elks in 2025

No. 32 – Edmonton Elks
- Position: Defensive back
- Roster status: Practice roster
- CFL status: American

Personal information
- Born: July 3, 1998 (age 28); Hayden, Alabama, U.S.
- Listed height: 6 ft 1 in (1.85 m)
- Listed weight: 200 lb (91 kg)

Career information
- High school: Hayden
- College: Duke (2017–2021)
- NFL draft: 2022: undrafted

Career history
- New York Giants (2023)*; Toronto Argonauts (2024); Hamilton Tiger-Cats (2024)*; Edmonton Elks (2025–present)
- * Offseason or practice squad member only

Awards and highlights
- Grey Cup champion (2026)
- Stats at Pro Football Reference
- Stats at CFL.ca

Leonard Johnson (born July 3, 1998) is an American professional football defensive back for the Edmonton Elks of the Canadian Football League (CFL). He played college football at Duke.

== Early life ==
Leonard Johnson was born on July 3, 1998, in Hayden, Alabama. He attended Hayden High School.

== College career ==
Johnson played college football for the Duke Blue Devils of Duke University. He was redshirted in 2017. He played in 47 games, starting 39, from 2018 to 2021, recording career totals of 118 solo tackles, 47 assisted tackles, six interceptions for 83 yards and one touchdown, 18 pass breakups, two sacks, three forced fumbles, and two fumble recoveries. Johnson graduated from Duke with a sociology degree with minors in education and marketing management.

== Professional career ==
Pre-draft measurables
Height	Weight	Arm length	Hand span	Wingspan	40-yard dash	10-yard split	20-yard split	20-yard shuttle	Three-cone drill	Vertical jump	Broad jump	Bench press
6 ft 0 3/8 in (1.84 m)	194 lb (88 kg)	31 1/8 in (0.79 m)	8 1/2 in (0.22 m)	6 ft 3 1/2 in (1.92 m)	4.50 s	1.50 s	2.61 s	4.15 s	6.65 s	33.0 in (0.84 m)	10 ft 5 in (3.18 m)	12 reps
All values from Pro Day

Johnson had a impressive performance at Duke's Pro Day, but later suffered a torn ACL and torn meniscus during a workout before the 2022 NFL draft. He went undrafted and spent the year going to physical therapy and working as a plumber.

=== New York Giants ===
Johnson signed with the New York Giants on March 21, 2023. He was waived/injured on July 19 with a knee injury and reverted to injured reserve the next day. He was waived from injured reserve on July 25, 2023.

=== Toronto Argonauts ===
Johnson signed with the Toronto Argonauts on December 29, 2023. He was moved to the practice roster on July 2, 2024, promoted to the active roster on July 10, and moved back to the practice roster on July 18. He was released on August 31, 2024. Johnson dressed in four games, all starts, for the Argonauts during the 2024 season, posting 24 tackles on defense.

=== Hamilton Tiger-Cats ===
Johnson was signed to the practice roster of the Hamilton Tiger-Cats on September 8, 2024. He was released on September 23, 2024.

=== Edmonton Elks ===
Johnson signed with the Edmonton Elks on December 9, 2024.
