= Silas Hubert =

Canadian gridiron football player (born 2001)

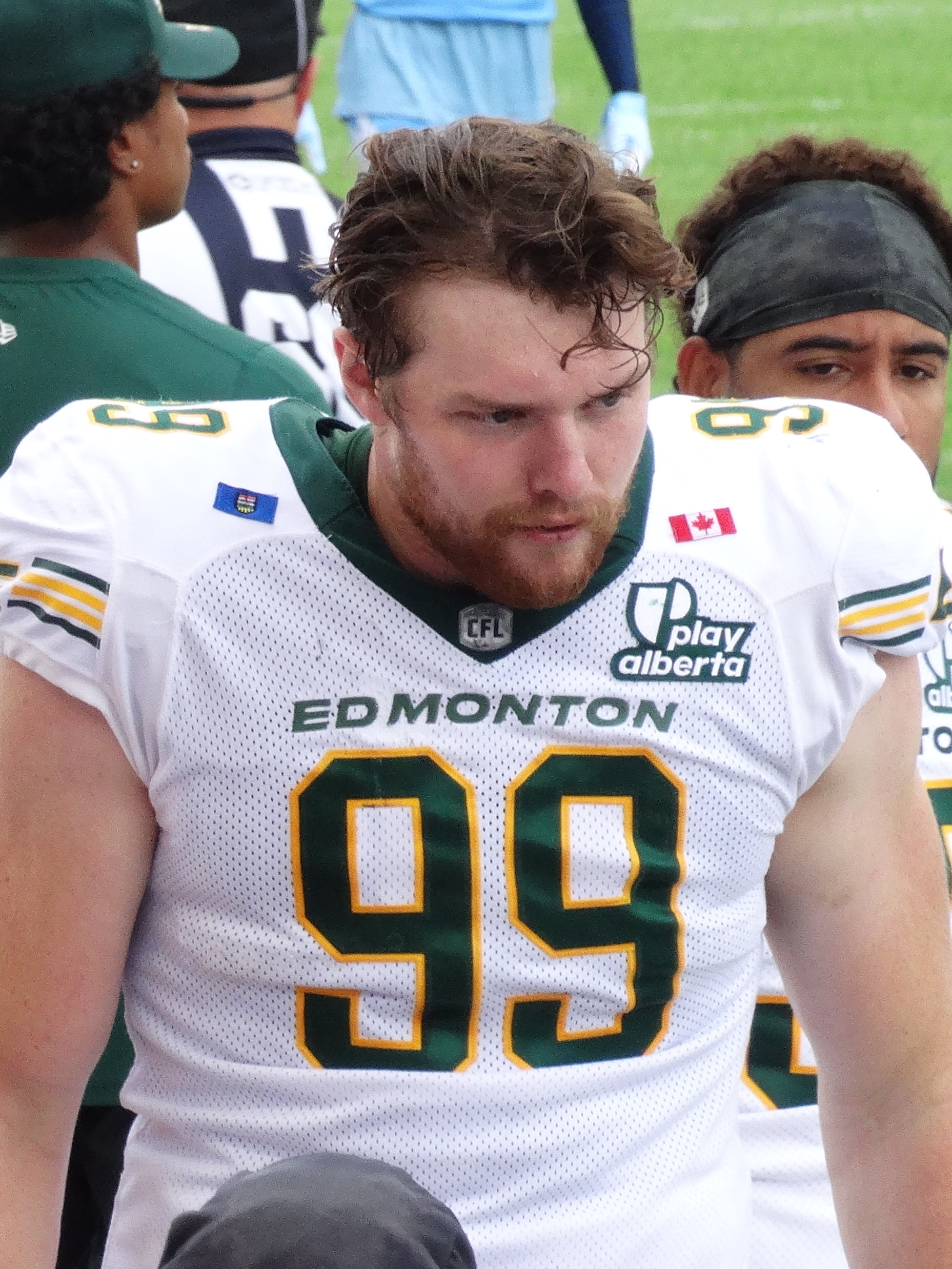
- Hubert with the Edmonton Elks in 2025

No. 99 – Edmonton Elks
- Position: Defensive lineman
- Roster status: 1-game injured list
- CFL status: National

Personal information
- Born: October 14, 2001 (age 25); Norwood, Ontario, Canada
- Listed height: 6 ft 5 in (1.96 m)
- Listed weight: 260 lb (118 kg)

Career information
- High school: Norwood (Norwood, Ontario)
- University: Queen's
- CFL draft: 2025: 4th round, 31st overall pick

Career history
- Edmonton Elks (2025–present)

Awards and highlights
- Grey Cup champion (2026); 2× OUA All-Star (2022, 2024); OUA Lineman of the Year (2022)
- Stats at CFL.ca

Silas Hubert (born October 14, 2001) is a Canadian professional football defensive lineman for the Edmonton Elks of the Canadian Football League (CFL). He played U Sports football at Queen's.

== Early life ==
Silas Hubert was born on October 14, 2001. He attended Norwood District High School in Norwood, Ontario, and graduated in 2021.

== University career ==
Hubert played U Sports football for the Queen's Gaels of Queen's University from 2021 to 2024. He played in eight games in 2021 and posted three solo tackles. He appeared in 11 games during the 2022 season, recording 20 solo tackles, 16 assisted tackles, eight sacks, and three pass breakups, earning Ontario University Athletics (OUA) All-Star and OUA Lineman of the Year honors. Hubert played in four games in 2023, posting eight solo tackles, four assisted tackles, three sacks, one forced fumble, and one pass breakup. He played in ten games as a senior in 2024, totaling 16 solo tackles, 18 assisted tackles, four sacks, one forced fumble, two fumble recoveries, two pass breakups, and one touchdown. He was named an OUA All-Star for the second time in his career. After the season, he was invited to the College Gridiron Showcase in Texas. He majored in environmental studies at Queen's.

== Professional career ==
Pre-draft measurables
Height	Weight	40-yard dash	20-yard shuttle	Three-cone drill	Vertical jump	Broad jump	Bench press
6 ft 5 in (1.96 m)	265 lb (120 kg)	4.76 s	4.40 s	7.28 s	30.0 in (0.76 m)	9 ft 9 3/4 in (2.99 m)	20 reps
All values from CFL Combine

Hubert was selected by the Edmonton Elks in the fourth round, with the 31st overall pick, of the 2025 CFL draft. He officially signed with the team on May 5, 2025.

== Personal life ==
Hubert's brother Owen also plays in the CFL.
