= Richard Jibunor =

Nigerian gridiron football player (born 1999)

No. 96 – Edmonton Elks
- Position: Defensive end
- Roster status: Active
- CFL status: Global

Personal information
- Born: May 17, 1999 (age 27); Delta State, Nigeria
- Listed height: 6 ft 2 in (1.88 m)
- Listed weight: 232 lb (105 kg)

Career information
- High school: Athens Christian (Athens, Georgia)
- College: Auburn (2018); Troy (2020–2023)
- NFL draft: 2024: undrafted
- CFL draft: 2025G: 1st round, 3rd overall pick

Career history
- Edmonton Elks (2025–present)

Awards and highlights
- Grey Cup champion (2026); First-team All-Sun Belt (2023); 3× Third-team All-Sun Belt (2020–2022)

Career CFL statistics as of 2026
- Games played: 13
- Tackles: 9
- Stats at CFL.ca
- Stats at Pro Football Reference

Richard Jibunor (born May 17, 1999) is a Nigerian professional Canadian football defensive end for the Edmonton Elks of the Canadian Football League (CFL). He played college football for the Auburn Tigers and the Troy Trojans.

== College career ==
Jibunor played college football for the Auburn Tigers in 2018 and the Troy Trojans from 2020 to 2023. As a true freshman, he played in 10 games recording eight tackles, including three for loss, two sacks and one forced fumble. On June 16, 2019, Jibunor entered the transfer portal, landing at Troy University.

Due to NCAA transfer rules, he had to sit out the 2019 season. Jibunor played in 50 for the Trojans, registering 183 totals tackles, including 50 for loss, 32.5 sacks, three interceptions, two pass deflections, two fumble recoveries and ten forced fumbles.

He earned third-team All-Sun Belt honors his first three seasons before he made first-team his final year off a ten sack season. Jibunor ended his career as the FBS’s active leader in sacks, solo sacks, assisted sacks, sack yards, tackle for loss yards and forced fumbles. He also finished his career second in Troy history and third in Sun Belt history with nine forced fumbles.

== Professional career ==
Pre-draft measurables
Height	Weight	Arm length	Hand span	Wingspan	40-yard dash	10-yard split	20-yard split	20-yard shuttle	Three-cone drill	Vertical jump	Broad jump	Bench press
6 ft 2 in (1.88 m)	232 lb (105 kg)	33 7/8 in (0.86 m)	9 3/4 in (0.25 m)	6 ft 10 1/2 in (2.10 m)	4.71 s	1.65 s	2.74 s	4.35 s	7.52 s	35 in (0.89 m)	10 ft 4 in (3.15 m)	25 reps
All values from Pro Day

Jibunor previously tried out for the Seattle Seahawks of the National Football League (NFL) after going unselected in the 2024 NFL Draft, but did not sign a contract. He was selected in the first round, with the third overall selection, by the Edmonton Elks of the Canadian Football League (CFL) in the 2025 CFL global draft. Jibunor signed with the team on August 30, 2025. He played in two total games, recording one special teams tackle, before ending the 2025 season on the injured list. Jibunor was signed to the practice roster ahead of the 2026 season. He was elevated to the active roster on June 19, 2026.

== Personal life ==
On December 31, 2017, Jibunor was arrested in Athens, Georgia on multiple charges. He was released on $2,000 bond after being charged with driving under the influence and failing to maintain lane and improper driving following a traffic stop.
