= Chris Fortin =

Canadian football player (born 2000)

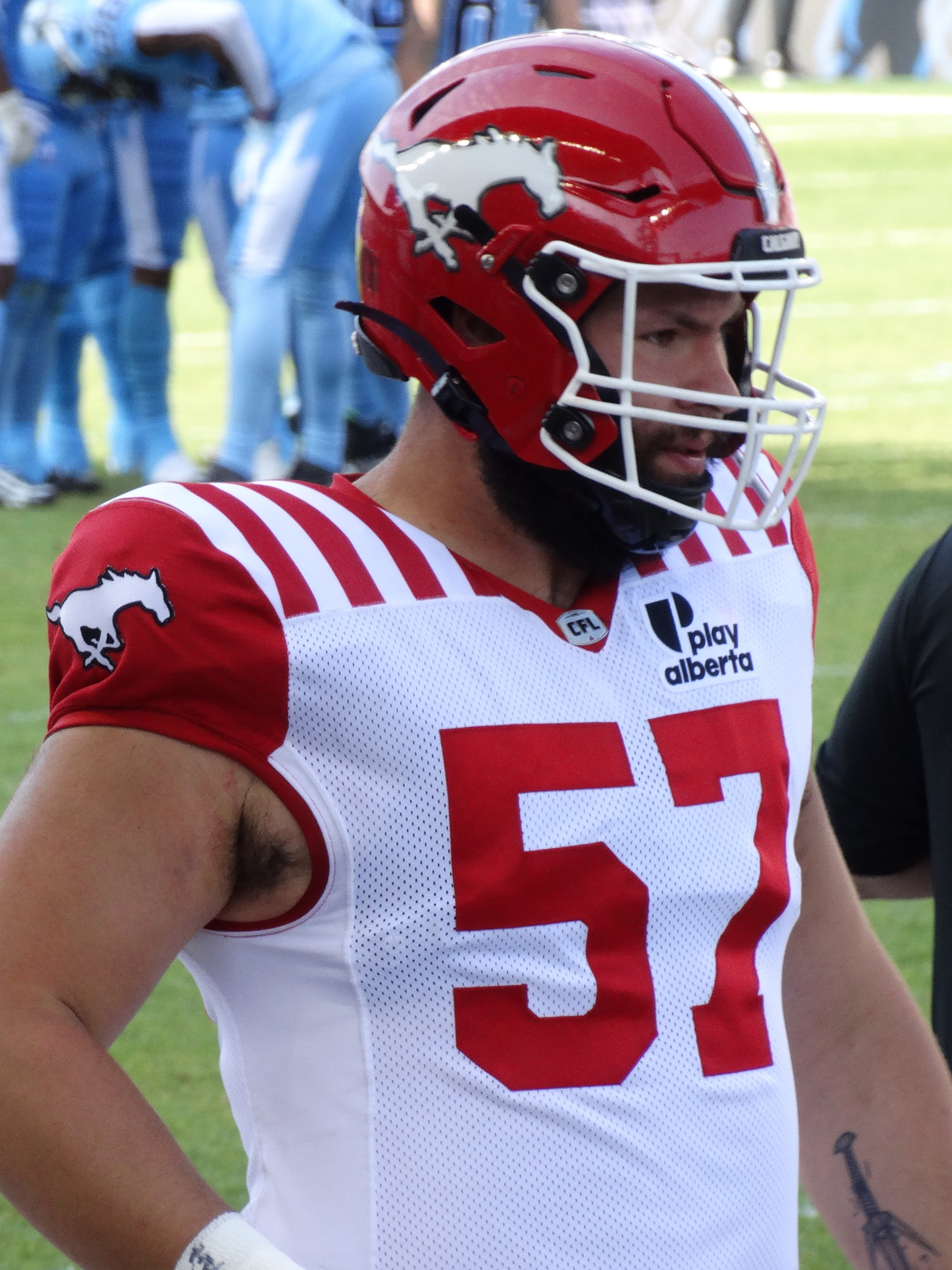
- Fortin with the Calgary Stampeders in 2025

No. 57 – Calgary Stampeders
- Position: Offensive lineman
- Roster status: Active
- CFL status: National

Personal information
- Born: January 16, 2000 (age 26); Saint-René, Quebec, Canada
- Listed height: 6 ft 4 in (1.93 m)
- Listed weight: 307 lb (139 kg)

Career information
- College: UConn
- CFL draft: 2025: 1st round, 8th overall pick

Career history
- Calgary Stampeders (2025–present)
- Stats at CFL.ca

Chris Fortin
Medal record

Men's American football

Representing Canada

World Championship
Gold medal – first place	2018 Mexico	Team competition

Christopher Fortin (born January 16, 2000) is a Canadian professional football offensive lineman for the Calgary Stampeders of the Canadian Football League (CFL). He plays college football at UConn.

== Early life ==
Christopher Fortin was born on January 16, 2000, in Saint-René, Quebec. He played CEGEP football at Cégep Beauce-Appalaches. He was named the league's best offensive lineman in 2019, and was also a two-time RSEQ all-star. Fortin helped the Canada national junior football team win the gold medal at the 2018 IFAF U-19 World Championship.

== College career ==
Fortin played college football for the UConn Huskies of the University of Connecticut. As a freshman in 2021, he played in six games as an offensive lineman. He appeared in ten games in 2022 on the offensive line and special teams. As a junior in 2023, Fortin played in 11 games on special teams and as a backup offensive lineman. He played in all 13 games his senior year in 2024, only allowing 12 pressures, three quarterback hits, and zero sacks on 421 pass-blocking snaps. He earned Phil Steele first-team All-Independent postseason honors in 2024. Fortin was a pre-sport management major at UConn.

== Professional career ==
Pre-draft measurables
Height	Weight	Arm length	Hand span	Wingspan	40-yard dash	10-yard split	20-yard split	20-yard shuttle	Three-cone drill	Vertical jump	Broad jump
6 ft 4 3/8 in (1.94 m)	300 lb (136 kg)	34 in (0.86 m)	10 1/4 in (0.26 m)	6 ft 9 in (2.06 m)	5.74 s	1.96 s	3.21 s	5.06 s	8.21 s	26.5 in (0.67 m)	8 ft 4 in (2.54 m)
All values from Pro Day

Fortin was selected by the Calgary Stampeders in the first round, with the eighth overall pick, of the 2025 CFL draft. He officially signed with the team on May 1, 2025. He was named the CFL Offensive Lineman of the Week for Week 10 of the 2025 season.
