= 2025 CFL global draft =

Canadian football draft

General information
- Sport: Canadian football
- Date: April 29, 2025
- Time: 11:00 am EDT
- Location: Toronto, Ontario

Overview
- 18 total selections in 2 rounds
- League: Canadian Football League
- First selection: Fraser Masin, Calgary Stampeders
- U Sports selections: 0
- NCAA selections: 17

The 2025 CFL global draft was a selection of non-Canadian and non-American players by Canadian Football League (CFL) teams that took place on April 29, 2025, at 11:00 am ET. It was the fifth CFL draft that pools all of the global players together after previously having separate drafts for Mexican players and European players in 2019.

== Draft format ==
This year's draft featured two rounds with a total of 18 selections. The draft order was based on the waiver priority (reverse standings from the previous year).

== Draft order ==
=== Round one ===
| Pick # | CFL team | Player | Position | University | Nationality |
|---|---|---|---|---|---|
| 1 | Calgary Stampeders | Fraser Masin | P | Mississippi | Australia |
| 2 | Winnipeg Blue Bombers (via Hamilton) | Kemari Munier-Bailey | DL | Weber State | United Kingdom |
| 3 | Edmonton Elks | Richard Jibunor | LB | Troy | Nigeria |
| 4 | BC Lions | Ross Bolger | K/P | Idaho State | Ireland |
| 5 | Ottawa Redblacks | Callum Eddings | K/P | Stephen F. Austin | Australia |
| 6 | Saskatchewan Roughriders | Sylvain Yondjouen | DL | Georgia Tech | Belgium |
| 7 | Montreal Alouettes | Joshua Sloan | P | Memphis | Australia |
| 8 | Hamilton Tiger-Cats (via Winnipeg) | Josh Green | P | Oregon State | Australia |
| 9 | Toronto Argonauts | Valentin Senn | OL | Connecticut | Austria |

=== Round two ===
| Pick # | CFL team | Player | Position | University | Nationality |
|---|---|---|---|---|---|
| 10 | Calgary Stampeders | Mark Vassett | P | Colorado | Australia |
| 11 | Hamilton Tiger-Cats | Maximilian Mang | TE | Syracuse | Germany |
| 12 | Edmonton Elks | Alex Raich | LB | Kansas | Switzerland |
| 13 | BC Lions | Mark McNamee | K | No college | Ireland |
| 14 | Ottawa Redblacks | James Burnip | P | Alabama | Australia |
| 15 | Saskatchewan Roughriders | Jesse Mirco | P | Vanderbilt | Australia |
| 16 | Montreal Alouettes | Joshua Hutley | P | Concord | Australia |
| 17 | Winnipeg Blue Bombers | James Evans | P | Indiana | New Zealand |
| 18 | Toronto Argonauts | Soane Toia | DL | San Jose State | Tonga |

== Trades ==
In the explanations below, (D) denotes trades that took place during the draft, while (PD) indicates trades completed pre-draft.

=== Round one ===
- Winnipeg ↔ Hamilton (D). Winnipeg traded the eighth overall pick in this year's draft, the 36th overall pick in the 2025 CFL draft, and Kyle Samson to Hamilton in exchange for Matthew Peterson, the second overall pick in this year's draft, and the 39th overall pick in the 2025 CFL draft.

== See also ==
- 2025 CFL draft
- 2025 NFL draft
