= Nicky Farinaccio =

Canadian football player (born 1999)

No. 41
- Position: Linebacker

Personal information
- Born: June 8, 1999 (age 27)
- Listed height: 6 ft 1 in (1.85 m)
- Listed weight: 224 lb (102 kg)

Career information
- University: Montreal
- CFL draft: 2025: 4th round, 32nd overall pick

Career history
- Calgary Stampeders (2025)

Awards and highlights
- Vanier Cup champion (2023); Bruce Coulter Award (2023); Presidents' Trophy (2022); First-team All-Canadian (2022); Second-team All-Canadian (2023); 2× RSEQ All-Star (2022–2023); RSEQ Defensive Player of the Year (2022)
- Stats at CFL.ca

Nicky Farinaccio (born June 8, 1999) is a Canadian professional football linebacker. He previously played for the Calgary Stampeders of the Canadian Football League (CFL). He played U Sports football at Montreal.

== Early life ==
Nicky Farinaccio was born on June 8, 1999. He played U Sports football for the Montreal Carabins of the Université de Montréal. He recorded 33.5 tackles, three forced fumbles, and a U Sports-leading 10.5 sacks in 2022. He won the Presidents' Trophy, given to the best U Sports defensive player who is not a defensive lineman. Farinaccio was also named a first-team All-Canadian, an RSEQ All-Star, and the RSEQ Defensive Player of the Year. In 2023, he helped the Carabins win the 58th Vanier Cup and earned the Bruce Coulter Award as the defensive player of the game. He also garnered second-team All-Canadian and RSEQ All-Star honors for the 2023 season.

Farinaccio played flag football in the FlagPlus Football League as well.

== Professional career ==
Farinaccio was selected by the Calgary Stampeders in the fourth round, with the 32nd overall pick, of the 2025 CFL draft. He officially signed with the team on May 5, 2025. He was moved to the practice roster on June 1, promoted to the active roster on June 20, and placed on the six-game injured list on July 17, 2025.
