= Taylor Powell =

American gridiron football player (born 1998)

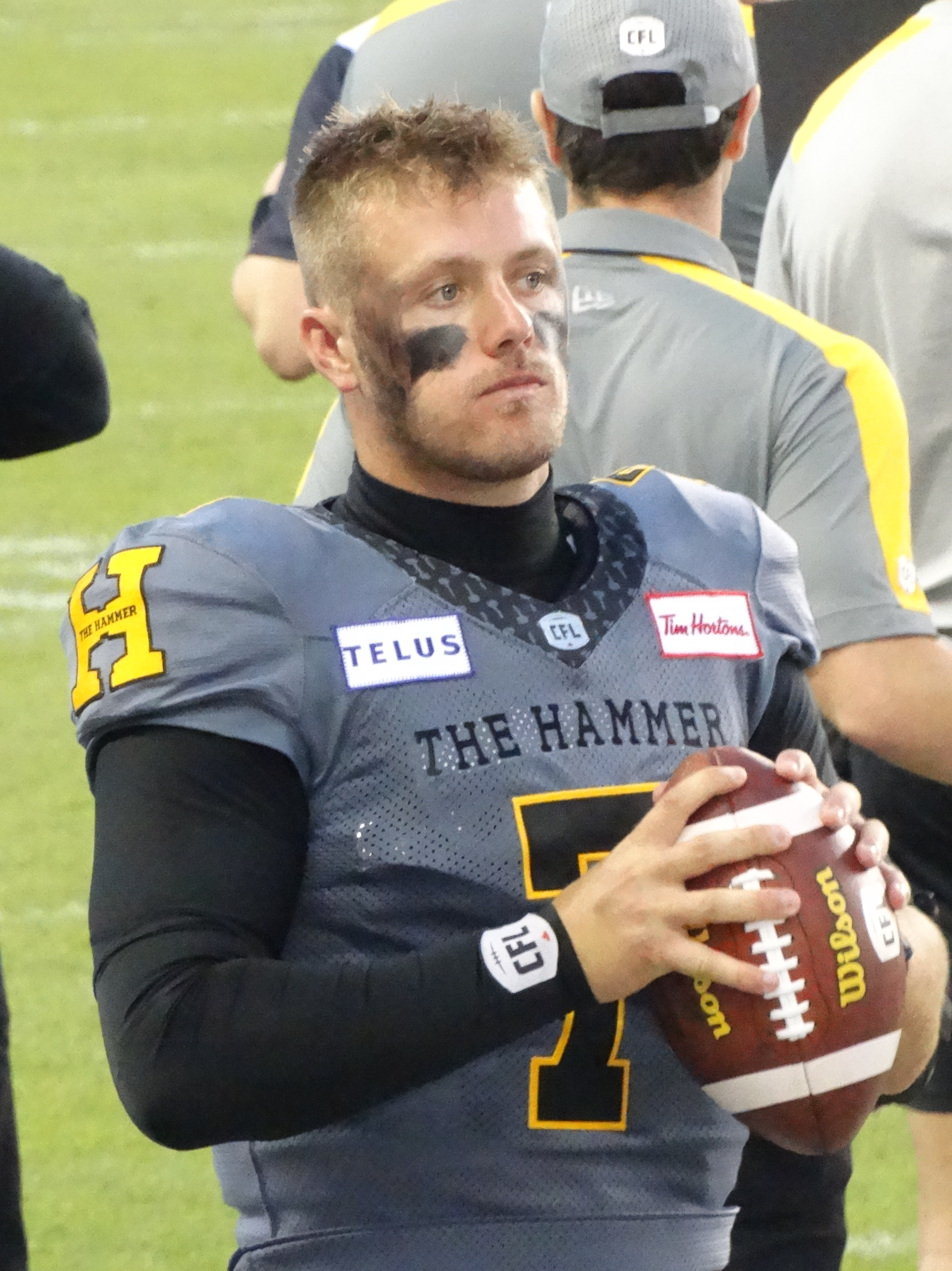
- Powell with the Hamilton Tiger-Cats in 2024

No. 8 – Edmonton Elks
- Position: Quarterback
- Roster status: Active
- CFL status: American

Personal information
- Born: October 21, 1998 (age 28); Fayetteville, Arkansas, U.S.
- Listed height: 6 ft 1 in (1.85 m)
- Listed weight: 208 lb (94 kg)

Career information
- High school: Fayetteville
- College: Missouri (2017–2019); Troy (2021); Eastern Michigan (2022)
- NFL draft: 2023: undrafted

Career history
- 2023–2025: Hamilton Tiger-Cats
- 2026–present: Edmonton Elks

Awards and highlights
- Grey Cup champion (2026)
- Stats at CFL.ca

Taylor Wilson Powell (born October 21, 1998) is an American professional football quarterback for the Edmonton Elks of the Canadian Football League (CFL).

== College career ==
After using a redshirt season in 2017, Powell played college football for the Missouri Tigers from 2018 to 2019 where he played in 15 games over three seasons, where he completed 35 of 76 pass attempts (46%) for 431 yards with one touchdown and two interceptions. He then sat out the 2020 season and transferred to Troy University where he played for the Trojans in 2021. That season, he played in six games, starting in five, where he completed 125 of 189 pass attempts (66.1%) for 1,251 yards with seven touchdowns and six interceptions before sitting out the rest of the season due to injury.

Powell then transferred again to Eastern Michigan University to play for the Eagles in 2022. In his final year of eligibility, he completed 174 of 269 pass attempts (64.6%) for 2,111 yards with 16 touchdowns and eight interceptions.

== Professional career ==
Pre-draft measurables
Height	Weight	Arm length	Hand span	Wingspan	40-yard dash	10-yard split	20-yard split	20-yard shuttle	Three-cone drill	Vertical jump
6 ft 0 1/8 in (1.83 m)	202 lb (92 kg)	29 in (0.74 m)	9 1/2 in (0.24 m)	6 ft 0 5/8 in (1.84 m)	4.91 s	1.74 s	2.81 s	4.57 s	7.32 s	26.5 in (0.67 m)
All values from Pro Day

After going undrafted and un-signed following the 2023 NFL draft, Powell attended rookie minicamp with the Carolina Panthers, but was not signed to a contract.

=== Hamilton Tiger-Cats ===
On May 17, 2023, Powell signed with the Hamilton Tiger-Cats. He made the team's active roster as the third-string quarterback following 2023 training camp and dressed in his first professional game on June 9, 2023, against the Winnipeg Blue Bombers. Following an injury to incumbent starter, Bo Levi Mitchell, in the second game of the season, Powell was elevated to the backup role behind Matthew Shiltz. However, Shiltz also suffered an injury in the fifth game of the season and Powell was pressed into his first game action on July 13, 2023. On his first pass attempt, he threw a 17-yard touchdown pass to Tim White. Powell finished the game having completed two of four passes for 47 yards and one touchdown.

On July 17, 2023, head coach Orlondo Steinauer announced Powell as the starting quarterback for the game against the Toronto Argonauts on July 21, 2023. In his first start, he completed 27 of 41 pass attempts for 282 yards and one interception in the loss to the Argonauts. While Mitchell returned to start the next game, he was injured again and Powell started in the week after. Despite Shiltz becoming healthy, Powell remained the starter through to week 15. In week 16, Mitchell was healthy and returned to the roster, while Powell was moved to the injured list.

Powell dressed in 15 regular season games and started in nine, recording a 4–5 record as a starter for a team that finished 8–10. He threw for 2,283 yards, had a 67.8% completion rate, and threw for 10 touchdowns and nine interceptions. Despite his impact during the regular season, Powell was a healthy scratch for the team's playoff loss that Shiltz started with Mitchell as backup and Kai Locksley as the short yardage quarterback.

With one year remaining on his contract, Powell signed a contract extension through 2025 on May 12, 2024. In 2024, under new head coach, Scott Milanovich, Mitchell was named the team's starter and Powell was named the team's primary backup following the departures of Shiltz and Locksley. In the team's week 10 game against the Alouettes, Mitchell was hooked early after an interception and Powell was inserted into the game. He then completed 30 of 38 pass attempts for 319 yards and two touchdowns in the loss to the Montreal Alouettes. With the team holding a 2–7 record, Mitchell was demoted and Powell was named the starter for the team's week 11 game against the Edmonton Elks. However, Powell was injured early in the game, leaving in an ambulance and later being diagnosed with a concussion. He sat out two games with injury, but was again the back up behind Mitchell when he returned in week 15.

In the 2025 season, Powell saw minimal playing time as the backup to a healthy Mitchell. Powell completed just six of eight passes for 47 yards that year. He became a free agent upon the expiry of his contract on February 10, 2026.

=== Edmonton Elks ===
The Edmonton Elks announced that they had signed Powell on February 11, 2026.

== Career statistics ==
=== CFL ===
Year	Team	Games			Passing								Rushing			
Year	Team	GD	GS	Record	Cmp	Att	Pct	Yds	Y/A	TD	Int	Rtg	Att	Yds	Y/A	TD
2023	HAM	16	9	4–5	197	292	67.5	2,383	7.8	10	9	89.5	29	196	6.8	1
2024	HAM	16	1	0–1	41	52	78.8	422	8.1	2	0	113.3	8	71	8.9	0
2025	HAM	18	0	—	6	8	75.0	47	5.9	0	0	89.1	0	0	0.0	0
2026	EDM	9	0	—	6	7	85.7	55	7.9	1	0	139.0	1	7	7.0	0
Career		59	10	4–6	250	359	69.6	2,807	7.8	13	9	94.3	38	274	7.2	1

=== College ===
Season	Team	Games			Passing								Rushing			
Season	Team	GP	GS	Record	Cmp	Att	Pct	Yds	Y/A	TD	Int	Rtg	Att	Yds	Avg	TD
2017	Missouri	Redshirted (redshirt)														
2018	Missouri	6	0	—	6	14	42.9	134	9.6	0	0	123.3	1	4	4.0	0
2019	Missouri	6	1	0–1	29	62	46.8	297	4.8	1	2	85.9	6	-3	-0.5	0
2020		Sat out														
2021	Troy	6	5	2–3	125	189	66.1	1,251	6.6	7	6	127.6	19	-95	-5.0	1
2022	Eastern Michigan	9	8	5–3	174	269	64.7	2,111	7.8	16	8	144.3	44	-98	-2.2	2
Career		27	14	7–7	334	534	62.5	3,793	7.1	24	16	144.3	70	-192	-2.7	3

== Personal life ==
Powell was born to parents Mark and Elizabeth Powell. He has one sister, Kailey.
