= Antonio Pipkin =

American football player (born 1995)

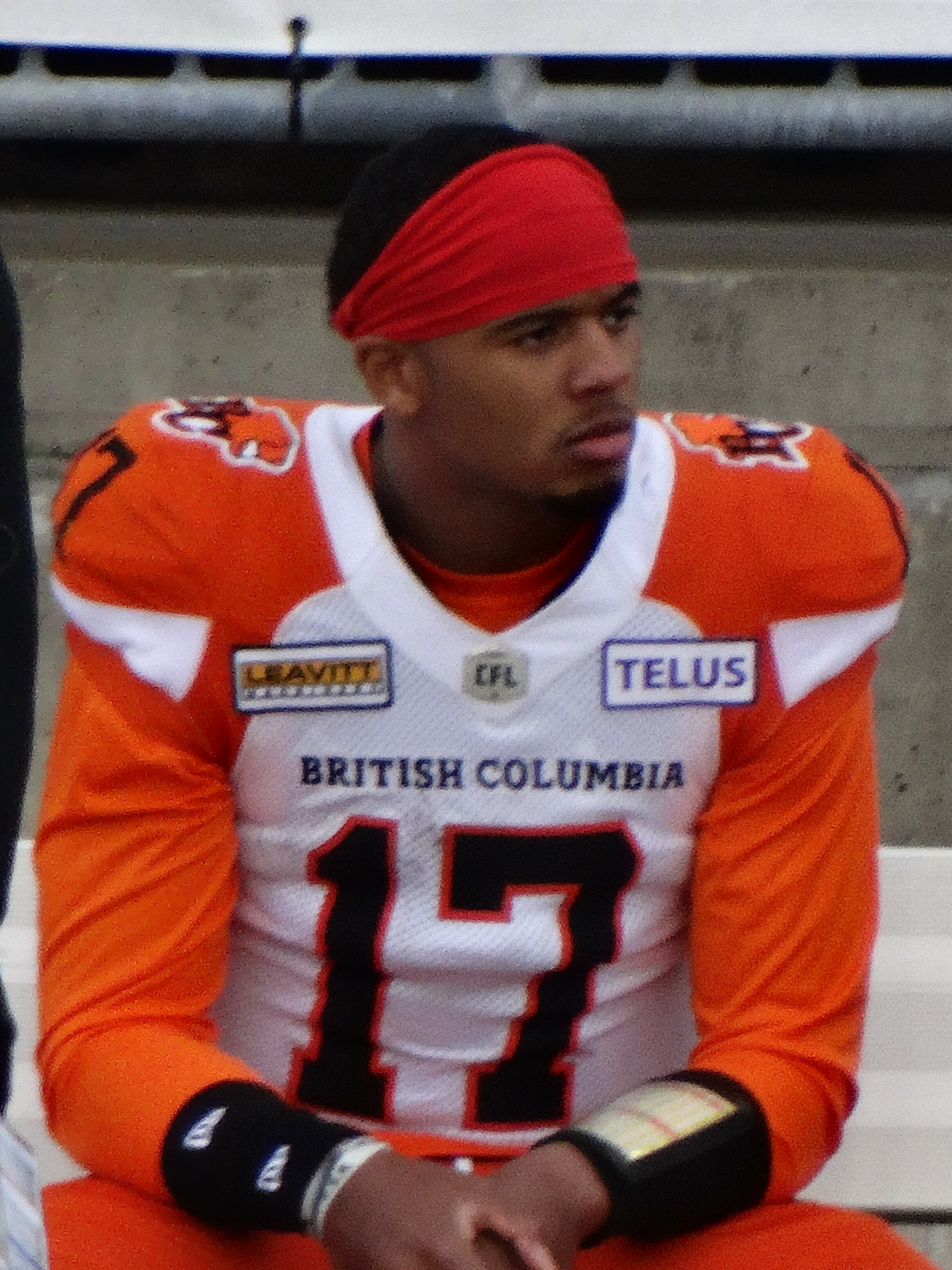
- Pipkin with the BC Lions in 2022

No. 16, 17, 20, 6
- Position: Quarterback

Personal information
- Born: July 19, 1995 (age 31); Gary, Indiana, U.S.
- Listed height: 6 ft 3 in (1.91 m)
- Listed weight: 225 lb (102 kg)

Career information
- High school: Thea Bowman (Gary)
- College: Tiffin
- NFL draft: 2017: undrafted

Career history
- 2017–2019: Montreal Alouettes
- 2020: Edmonton Football Team*
- 2021–2022: Toronto Argonauts
- 2022: BC Lions
- 2023: Hamilton Tiger-Cats
- 2023: Saskatchewan Roughriders
- * Offseason or practice squad member only
- Stats at CFL.ca

Antonio Pipkin (born July 19, 1995) is an American former professional football player who was a quarterback in the Canadian Football League (CFL) with the Montreal Alouettes, Toronto Argonauts, BC Lions, Hamilton Tiger-Cats, and Saskatchewan Roughriders. He played college football for the Tiffin Dragons.

== Early life ==
Antonio Pipkin was born on July 19, 1995. He attended Thea Bowman Leadership Academy in Gary, Indiana.

== College career ==
Pipkin played quarterback for Tiffin University from 2014 to 2016. As a freshman in 2014, Pipkin completed 33 out of 54 pass attempts (61.1%) for 231-yards and one touchdown with three interceptions. In 2015, Pipkin became the Dragon's starting quarterback and finished the season with 250 completions out of 390 attempts (64.1%) for a career-high 3,227 passing yards and 32 touchdown and six interceptions in 11 games and 11 starts. He returned for his junior season in 2016 and completed 216 passes, out of 333 pass attempts (64.9%) for 2,534 passing yards. Pipkin also had 25 touchdown passes and six interceptions in 11 games and 11 starts. He finished his college career with a total of 499 pass completions, 777 pass attempts (64.2%), 58 touchdown passes, and 15 interceptions in 23 games and 23 starts.

== Professional career ==
After going undrafted in the 2017 NFL draft, Pipkin attended rookie minicamp on a tryout basis with the Arizona Cardinals.

=== Montreal Alouettes ===
Pipkin was signed by the Alouettes on June 5, 2017. Pipkin made his first professional appearance on November 3, 2017, in the last week of the 2017 season. Pipkin completed only two of nine pass attempts for 14 yards. He was released June 19, 2018. He was re-signed by the team on August 6, 2018. Pipkin became the sixth Alouettes quarterback to start a game in the 2018 season (Drew Willy, Jeff Mathews, Matthew Shiltz, Vernon Adams, Johnny Manziel) when he started in the team's Week 10 match against the Edmonton Eskimos. Pipkin, who was making his first professional start, completed 14 of 25 pass attempts for 217 yards with one touchdown and one interception. Pipkin earned his first career win the following week when the Alouettes defeated the Toronto Argonauts. The Alouettes decided to stick with Pipkin as their starting quarterback despite Johnny Manziel recovering from a concussion. Pipkin struggled in Week 14, throwing four interceptions, two of which were returned for touchdowns, en route to a 32–14 defeat by the BC Lions. In the days following Head Coach Mike Sherman announced that Manziel would start in the teams Week 15 match against the Bombers. Pipkin signed a two-year contract extension with the Alouettes on October 28, 2018, and later that day played the second half of the Alouettes' second last game of the season.

Pipkin was named the Als' starting quarterback for Week 1 of the 2019 season, ahead of Vernon Adams Jr. Pipkin suffered a lower leg injury in the team's Week 1 loss to the Eskimos, and was expected to miss 4–6 weeks. He returned to action partway through the Al's Week 8 game against the Redblacks, after an injury to Vernon Adams, but Pipkin was unable to lead the team to victory, completing 8 out of 17 passes. Pipkin started in Week 9 for a still injured Adams, but was unable to lead Montreal to a win in the first ever weather shortened game. Vernon Adams returned to the starting role the following week and remained the starter for the remainder of the season while Pipkin was relegated to the third quarterback role. As a backup to Matthew Shiltz who was starting in place of a suspended Adams, Pipkin fumbled the ball on a short yardage plunge at the BC Lions 2 yard line, costing the Alouettes the game. Pipkin was released by the Alouettes on January 30, 2020. His release took effect prior to a series of off-season bonuses due to be paid totaling 23,500 CND over 4 months.

=== Edmonton Football Team ===
Pipkin was signed by the Edmonton Football Team to a one-year contract on February 13, 2020. However, the league cancelled play for the 2020 CFL season and Pipkin did not play for the team as his contract expired in 2021.

=== Toronto Argonauts ===
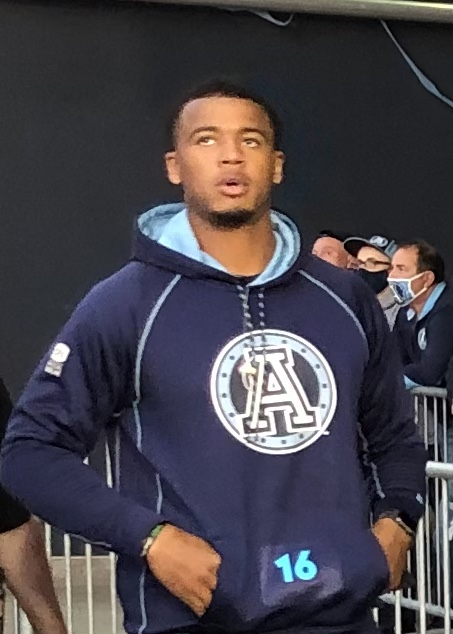
Pipkin with the Toronto Argonauts in 2021

On February 9, 2021, the first day of free agency, Pipkin signed with the Toronto Argonauts. He served primarily as the third-string quarterback during the 2021 season, but was elevated to the backup following the trade of Nick Arbuckle to the Edmonton Elks. He started the final game of the regular season where he completed 10 of 22 pass attempts for 111 yards and one interception, but also had nine carries for 78 yards and one touchdown. He spent part of 2022 training camp with the team, but was released after the first pre-season game on May 29, 2022.

=== BC Lions ===
On May 31, 2022, it was announced that Pipkin had signed with the BC Lions. On September 10, 2022, Pipkin made his first start for the Lions. BC was defeated 31–10 by the Montreal Alouettes with Pipkin completing only 13 of 24 pass attempts for 174 yards and an interception. The Lions' starting quarterback Nathan Rourke was injured at the time, and newly acquired Vernon Adams was still being brought up to speed with the offense. He became a free agent upon the expiry of his contract on February 14, 2023.

=== Hamilton Tiger-Cats ===
On July 18, 2023, It was announced that Pipkin had been signed by the Hamilton Tiger-Cats due to the injuries of starting quarterback Bo Levi Mitchell and backup Matthew Shiltz. He played in two games and spent one game on the practice roster, but did not record any statistics.

=== Saskatchewan Roughriders ===
On August 13, 2023, Pipkin was traded to the Saskatchewan Roughriders in exchange for Kaare Vedvik. He played in nine games where he operated the short yardage unit and had 25 carries for 49 yards with five touchdowns and had one pass completion for 57 yards. He signed a contract extension on November 23, 2023. However, he was part of final training camp cuts in 2024 and was released on June 1, 2024.

== Career statistics ==
=== CFL ===
		Games			Passing							Rushing
Year	Team	GP	GS	Rec	Comp	Att	Pct	Yards	TD	Int	Rating	Att	Yards	Avg	Long	TD	Fumb
2017	MTL	1	0	0–0	2	9	22.2	14	0	0	39.6	2	5	2.5	5	0	0
2018	MTL	12	4	2–2	78	131	59.5	1,120	3	8	69.5	45	252	5.6	28	8	0
2019	MTL	14	2	0–2	19	42	45.2	161	1	0	63.7	11	61	5.5	18	1	0
2020	EDM	Season cancelled
2021	TOR	7	1	0–1	13	26	50.0	158	0	1	53.0	27	131	4.9	34	5	1
2022	BC	18	1	0–1	29	52	55.8	393	2	1	84.9	43	137	3.2	16	7	1
2023	HAM	2	0	0–0	0	0	0.0	0	0	0	0.0	0	0	0.0	0	0	0
2023	SSK	9	0	0–0	1	1	100.0	57	0	0	118.8	25	49	2.0	10	5	0
CFL totals		63	8	2–6	142	261	54.4	1,903	6	10	69.5	153	635	4.2	34	26	2

=== College ===
Year	Team	Games		Passing								Rushing			
Year	Team	GP	Record	Comp	Att	Pct	Yards	Avg	TD	Int	Rate	Att	Yards	Avg	TD
2013	Tiffin	11	2–9	253	381	66.4	2,317	6.1	12	12	121.6	120	165	1.4	5
2014	Tiffin	11	5–6	260	409	63.6	2,863	7.0	19	8	133.8	143	556	3.9	5
2015	Tiffin	11	5–6	250	390	64.1	3,227	8.3	32	6	157.6	125	722	5.8	8
2016	Tiffin	11	8–3	216	333	64.9	2,534	7.6	25	6	150.0	122	757	6.2	7
Career		44	20–24	979	1,513	64.7	10,941	7.2	88	32	140.4	510	2,200	4.3	25
