= Matthew Shiltz =

American gridiron football player (born 1992)

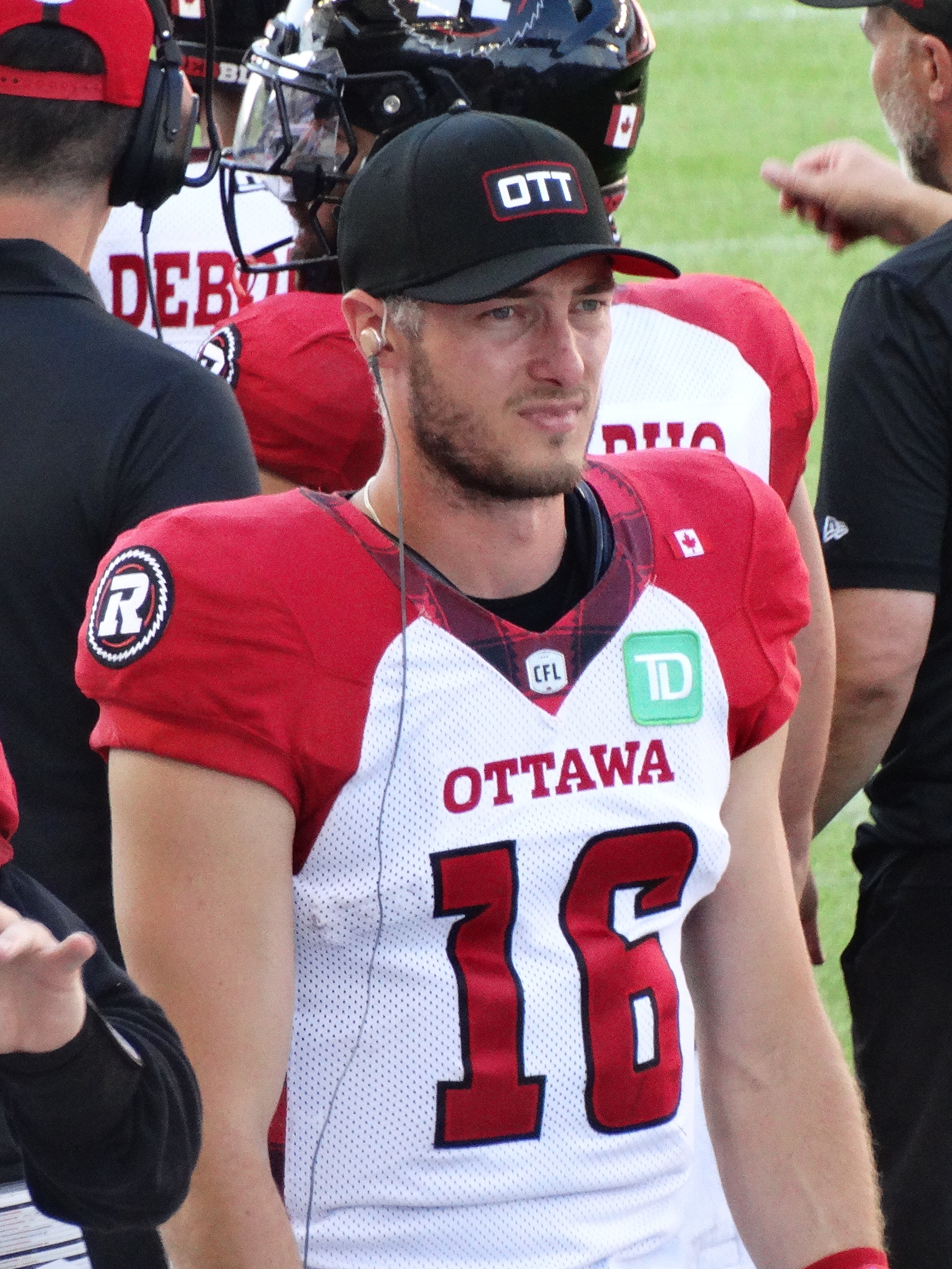
- Shiltz with the Ottawa Redblacks in 2025

No. 18, 16
- Position: Quarterback

Personal information
- Born: December 7, 1992 (age 33); St. Charles, Illinois, U.S.
- Listed height: 6 ft 2 in (1.88 m)
- Listed weight: 205 lb (93 kg)

Career information
- High school: St. Charles North
- College: Butler
- NFL draft: 2016: undrafted

Career history
- 2017–2021: Montreal Alouettes
- 2022–2023: Hamilton Tiger-Cats
- 2024: Calgary Stampeders
- 2025: Ottawa Redblacks

Career CFL statistics
- Pass completions: 401
- Pass attempts: 626
- Percentage: 64.1
- Passing yards: 5,078
- TD–INT: 22–27
- Stats at CFL.ca

Matthew Shiltz (born December 7, 1992) is an American former professional football quarterback who played eight seasons in the Canadian Football League (CFL) with the Montreal Alouettes, Hamilton Tiger-Cats, Calgary Stampeders, and Ottawa Redblacks. He played college football for the Butler Bulldogs.

== College career ==
Shiltz attended Butler University and was the starting quarterback for the Bulldogs for part of 2014 and all of the 2015 season. In his first season he completed 106 of 171 pass attempts (62.0%) for 1,324 yards with 10 touchdowns and four interceptions. In his senior season Shiltz attempted 381 passes, of which he completed 218 (57.2%), for 2,713 yards with 19 touchdowns and nine interceptions. In 2015, he also ran the ball for 639 yards and 10 touchdowns.

== Professional career ==
Pre-draft measurables
Height	Weight	Arm length	Hand span	40-yard dash	10-yard split	20-yard split	20-yard shuttle	Three-cone drill	Vertical jump	Broad jump
6 ft 2 in (1.88 m)	197 lb (89 kg)	31 1/2 in (0.80 m)	9 3/4 in (0.25 m)	4.61 s	1.53 s	2.65 s	4.25 s	7.15 s	36.0 in (0.91 m)	10 ft 1 in (3.07 m)
All values from Pro Day

=== Montreal Alouettes ===
After going undrafted in the 2016 NFL draft Shiltz began working for Ernst & Young in Indianapolis at which time he was invited to the Montreal Alouettes' April mini-camp for the 2017 season. On April 4, 2017 he signed a contract with the Alouettes. On November 4, 2017, in the Montreal Alouettes final game of the 2017 CFL season, he started his first professional game, completing seven of 16 passes for 96 yards before being replaced in the third quarter. Prior to the final game of the season, Shiltz had played three games in relief for injured Montreal quarterbacks, during which he completed 28 of 45 passes for 289 yards, including one touchdown.

In training camp for the 2018 season it was revealed that Shiltz and veteran Drew Willy were in contention for the starting role to open the season. Shiltz only played in two games during the 2018 season, completing 19 of 30 pass attempts for 194 yards with one touchdown and three interceptions. Shiltz entered the 2019 season as the team's third quarterback, behind Vernon Adams and Antonio Pipkin. Midway through the season Shiltz and the Alouettes agreed to a one-year contract extension. Shiltz was named the starting quarterback for the Alouettes in their Week 16 match against the BC Lions after Vernon Adams was suspended for one game. Shiltz completed 10 of 19 pass attempts for 177 yards with a touchdown and an interception: He also ran for 62 yards and a touchdown, but the game was lost on a goal line fumble from Antonio Pipkin.

Following the cancellation of the 2020 season Shiltz re-signed with the Alouettes on December 16, 2020. Late in the team's Week 10 match against the Redblacks starting quarterback Vernon Adams Jr suffered a shoulder injury, thrusting Shiltz into the starting role where he completed all three of his pass attempts for 36 yards setting up the game winning touchdown. The following week Shiltz started in place of Vernon Adams, and played well leading the Alouettes to a 27–16 win over the Ottawa Redblacks. The next day on October 17, 2021, the Alouettes announced that they had traded for veteran quarterback Trevor Harris, giving Shiltz competition for the position while he remained the team's starter for the next game. Shiltz threw two touchdown passes in a 37–16 win over the Toronto Argonauts. Shiltz ended up being benched for Harris during the following game, and was placed on the injured list, missing the rest of the season. As a pending free agent in 2022, Shiltz was released by the Alouettes on February 4, 2022.

=== Hamilton Tiger-Cats ===
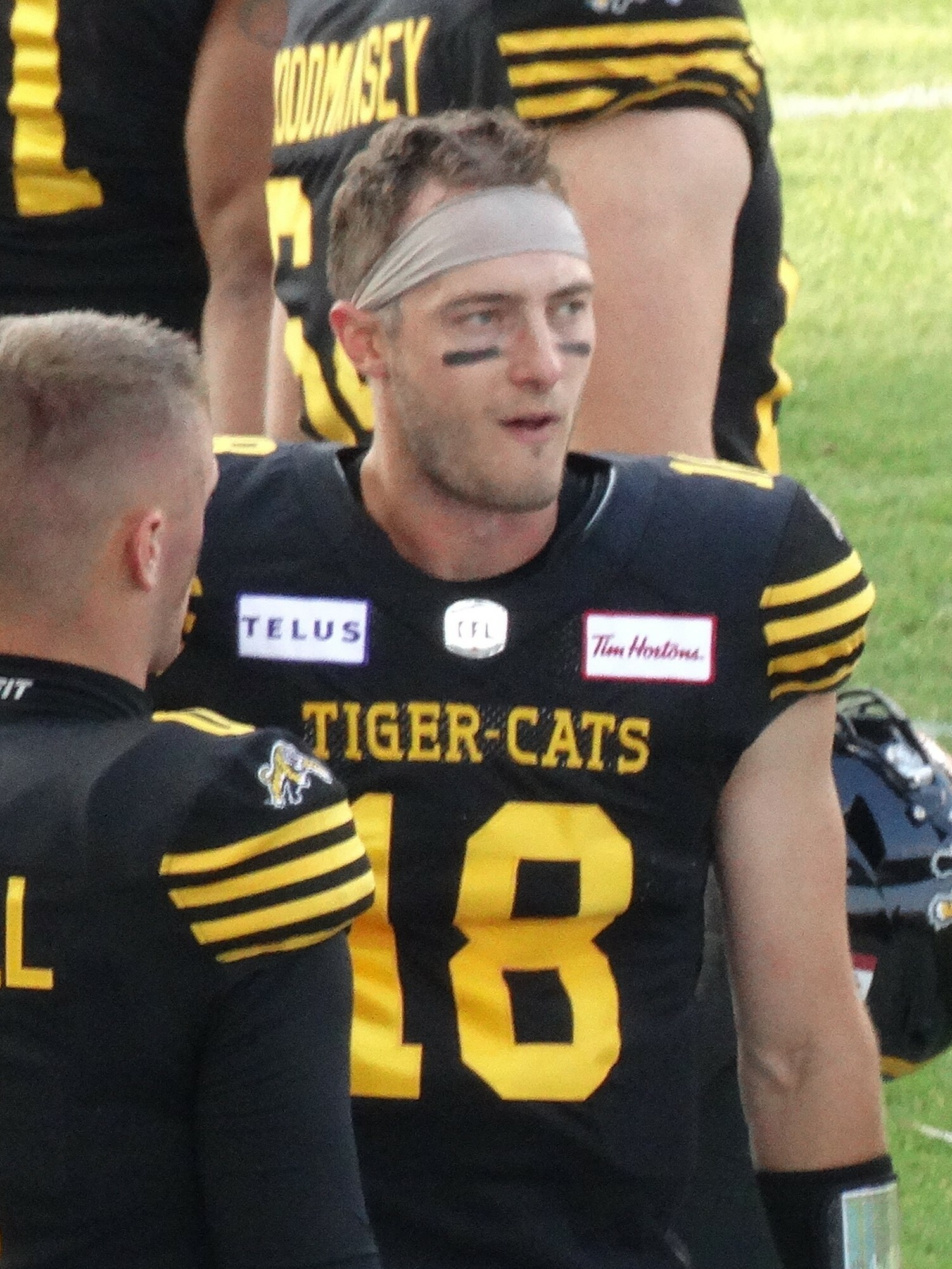
Shiltz with the Hamilton Tiger-Cats in 2023

On February 6, 2022, it was announced that Shiltz had signed a one-year contract with the Hamilton Tiger-Cats. His salary for the 2022 season was reported at $125,000. In late August 2022, it was announced that Shiltz would miss the next four-to-six weeks recovering from a wrist injury. At the time of the injury, Shiltz had been splitting snaps at quarterback with starter Dane Evans. Shiltz finished the season having played in all but one of the regular season games, completing 85 of 119 pass attempts for 935 yards with four touchdowns and two interceptions. He also ran the ball 28 times for 152 yards with one score. On February 6, 2023, Shiltz and Hamilton agreed to a contract extension.

Shiltz began the 2023 season as the backup quarterback to Bo Levi Mitchell whom the club acquired in the off-season. He came off the bench in Week 2 and completed 13 of 14 attempts for 115 yards and a touchdown. In late June, Mitchell was placed on the six-game injured reserve list with an adductor injury, which elevated Shiltz to the starting role while Mitchell recovered. He started three games for the Tiger-Cats, leading the team to a 2–1 record, but was injured in the team's week 5 game against the Edmonton Elks and subsequently placed on the six-game injured list himself. After sitting for six games, he returned to the active roster, but rookie Taylor Powell continued to start at quarterback for the Tiger-Cats while Shiltz remained the backup. Mitchell also returned from injury and started in the last three games of the season, with Shitlz getting playing time in relief. In total, Schiltz played in 11 regular season games, starting in three, where he completed 108 of 161 pass attempts for 1,556 yards, seven touchdowns, and five interceptions. He also recorded 23 carries for 160 yards and one touchdown.

Despite Mitchell being available to play, Shiltz was named the starter for the first time in his career in the 2023 post-season, as head coach Orlondo Steinauer named him the starter for the East Semi-Final. He completed 13 of 23 passes for 144 yards and one interception along with four carries for 34 yards in the 27–12 loss to the Alouettes. He became a free agent upon the expiry of his contract on February 13, 2024.

=== Calgary Stampeders ===
On February 13, 2024, it was announced that Shiltz had signed with the Calgary Stampeders. He played in ten games where he completed 34 of 62 pass attempts for 438 yards with two touchdowns and two interceptions. He became a free agent upon the expiry of his contract on February 11, 2025.

=== Ottawa Redblacks ===
On February 11, 2025, Shiltz signed a one-year contract with the Ottawa Redblacks. He dressed in all 18 regular season games, starting in one, where he completed 29 of 47 pass attempts for 283 yards with one touchdown pass and seven interceptions. Shiltz announced his retirement on December 19.
