= Bamidele Olaseni =

English-American football player (born 1996)

No. 79
- Position: Offensive tackle

Personal information
- Born: 12 January 1996 (age 30); London, England
- Listed height: 6 ft 7 in (2.01 m)
- Listed weight: 339 lb (154 kg)

Career information
- College: Garden City CC (2017–2018); Utah (2019–2021)
- NFL draft: 2022: undrafted
- CFL draft: 2022G: 1st round, 7th overall pick

Career history
- Las Vegas Raiders (2022)*; Houston Gamblers (2022–2023)
- * Offseason or practice squad member only

Awards and highlights
- Second-team All-Pac-12 (2021)
- Stats at Pro Football Reference

Bamidele Matthew Olaseni (born 12 January 1996), known as Bam, is an English former player of American football who was an offensive tackle. He played college football for the Utah Utes.

== College career ==
Olaseni, originally from London, England, began playing football in his homeland in the London Blitz under-19 team, a franchise whose first team participates in the British American Football Championship, and then moved to the United States in 2017, attending Garden City Community College in Garden City, Kansas, and thus going to play with the Broncbusters who play in the Kansas Jayhawk Community College Conference (KJCCC) of the National Junior College Athletic Association (NJCAA). In 2018, Olaseni helped the Broncbusters reach the championship final (lost against East Mississippi) and was included among the best players of the season in the entire championship (All-America Team).

Due to his performances, Olaseni received offers from various NCAA colleges, choosing to enroll in 2019 at the University of Utah and playing with the Utes who play in the Pacific-12 Conference (Pac-12) of Division I of the Football Bowl Subdivision (FBS). In his first season at college he was redshirted, meaning he could train but not take part in official matches. He still managed to play right tackle in two games, including one as a starter, without losing his redshirt status. In 2020, he played on special teams in all five games of the championship, shortened by the COVID-19 pandemic. In 2021, he played in all 14 games of the season, 11 as a starter, as left tackle. The 2021 season concluded with the Utes' first Rose Bowl appearance in history, losing to Ohio State, and then Olaseni was invited to the 97th East–West Shrine Bowl, a college football all-star game.

At the end of the season Olaseni declared himself eligible for the 2022 NFL draft. Olaseni was included by the NFL, together with 12 other athletes, in the International Player Pathway Program, aimed at encouraging the arrival of players of international origin in the main US professional league.

=== College statistics ===
Season	Team	Games	
Season	Team	GP	GS
2017	Garden City	10	0
2018	Garden City	0	0
2019	Utah	2	1
2020	Utah	5	0
2021	Utah	13	9
Career		30	10

Source: Football DBCareer personal bests are in bold

== Professional career ==
=== Las Vegas Raiders ===
Olaseni was not chosen during the 2022 NFL draft, but on the other hand, was the first choice of the Calgary Stampeders during the 2022 CFL global draft of the Canadian Football League (CFL), an event of the Canadian league for the selection of international players. On May 12, 2022, he signed as an undrafted free agent with the Las Vegas Raiders.

On August 30, 2022, Olaseni did not return to the team's initial active roster and was released by the Raiders and then signed with the practice squad the following day but was then released again on September 1, 2022.

=== Houston Gamblers ===
In October 2022, Olaseni signed for the Houston Gamblers of the United States Football League (USFL), a minor American professional league which, after an experience in the 1980s, had resumed its activities from 2022, with the season scheduled for the spring period.

== Personal life ==
On March 28, 2023, Olaseni announced that he was in the process of trying out for Wrestlemania 39.
