= Bailey Flint =

Australian gridiron football player (born 1996)

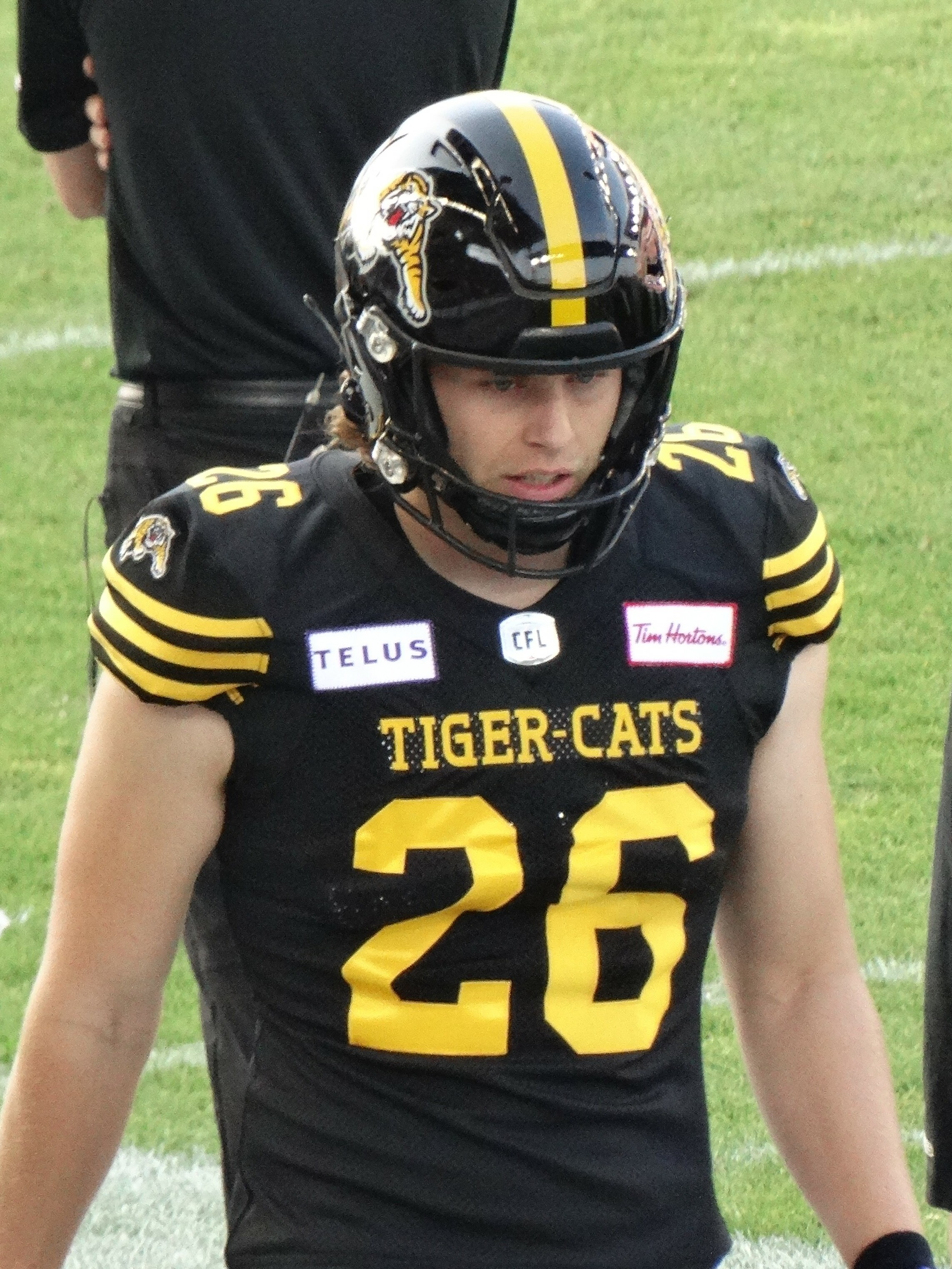
- Flint with the Hamilton Tiger-Cats in 2023

Profile
- Position: Punter

Personal information
- Born: September 5, 1996 (age 30); Melbourne, Victoria, Australia
- Listed height: 6 ft 4 in (1.93 m)
- Listed weight: 210 lb (95 kg)

Career information
- High school: Layton Christian Academy (Layton, Utah)
- College: Toledo
- CFL draft: 2022G: 1st round, 2nd overall pick

Career history
- 2023: Hamilton Tiger-Cats
- 2025: Saskatchewan Roughriders*
- * Offseason or practice squad member only
- Stats at CFL.ca

Bailey Robert Flint (born September 5, 1996) is an Australian professional gridiron football punter. He played college football at Toledo.

== Early life ==
A native of Melbourne, Australia, Flint played gridiron football for the first time in 2015 when he participated in a nine-on-nine football game. Just a few months after joining his local club team, he played with Team Australia in the Down Under Bowl. From there, Flint got the chance to play one year of high school football at Layton Christian Academy in Layton, Utah, during which he weighed 260 pounds and played both right tackle and defensive end. He went on to lose a large amount of weight but gave up on the sport as he did not think he could play college football.

Flint then trained with Prokick Australia, a Melbourne-based academy designed to convert Australian athletes into gridiron football kickers and punters at the collegiate and professional levels. He credits the program with re-igniting his drive to succeed in the sport.

== College career ==
Flint played 49 games in five seasons with the Toledo Rockets from 2017 to 2021, recording 211 punts for 8,501 yards and an average of 40.3 yards per punt. He also had 16 touchbacks and only had one punt blocked.

As a freshman, Flint played in all 14 games and recorded 47 punts for an average of 38.0 yards, including a season-long 57-yard punt against Ball State. As a sophomore, he appeared in 13 games and punted 61 times for an average of 40.9 yards. In a win over Bowling Green, Flint ran for a first down after a fake punt. Two weeks later, he punted eight times for an average of 41.4 yards against Buffalo, earning Mid-American Conference (MAC) West Co-Special Teams Player of the Week honors. As a junior in 2019, Flint averaged 47.3 yards per punt until he missed the final eight games after suffering a season-ending injury that damaged several ligaments in his left ankle. In a win over Colorado State, he averaged 52.0 yards on six punts, including a career-high 72 yarder in the first quarter.

Prior to his senior season in 2020, Flint was named to the preseason watchlist for the Ray Guy Award, given to the nation's best punter. He was also named a team captain. Flint punted 19 times for an average of 36.4 yards per punt before the remainder of the season was canceled due to the COVID-19 pandemic.

He used the extra year of eligibility granted to college athletes due to the shortened 2020 season and returned to Toledo for a fifth year in 2021. Flint was named to the Ray Guy Award preseason watchlist for the second year in a row. He punted 64 times for 2,578 yards and an average of 40.3 yards per punt. In a loss to Notre Dame, Flint punted seven times for an average of 45.4 yards, including punts of 68 and 57 yards, and earned MAC West Special Teams Player of the Week honors.

== Professional career ==
=== Hamilton Tiger-Cats ===
Flint was selected by the Hamilton Tiger-Cats of the Canadian Football League (CFL) as the second overall pick in the 2022 CFL global draft. Later that month he was invited to the Pittsburgh Steelers rookie minicamp on a tryout basis, but was not signed.

On May 5, 2023, it was announced that he had signed with the Tiger-Cats. He played in eight games in 2023 where he had 52 punts with a 45.1-yard average. He was released on June 1, 2024.

=== Saskatchewan Roughriders ===
On April 7, 2025, it was announced that Bailey had signed with the Saskatchewan Roughriders. He was released on June 2, 2025.

== Personal life ==
Bailey Flint was born to Douglas Flint and Rachel Perry and has one brother and two sisters. He was the first person in his family to graduate high school. Flint went on to graduate from the University of Toledo with bachelor's degrees in media communication and theater, performing in the university's production of All Quiet on the Western Front in 2018. Flint studied theatre in Moscow the following year. Flint also gained a considerable social media following while at Toledo, garnering over 160,000 TikTok followers by his fifth year, which was the most of any Toledo student-athlete. However, due to being an international student, he was not able to receive compensation for use of his name, image, and likeness (NIL).

Flint also sings and plays the ukulele and has recorded over 40 songs as of 2021. In July 2021, he released a five-song extended play (EP) called #TheHeartbreakClub.

He is married to Racing Louisville FC NWSL player Taylor Kornieck.

=== Community service ===
During his time in school, Flint became well known in Toledo for his commitment to community service. For several years, he volunteered at My First Days Daycare to read and spend time with the children and even recorded YouTube videos of himself reading for them to watch during the COVID-19 pandemic. He later sold t-shirts to raise money to update the daycare facilities. Flint credits his own modest upbringing in Australia, and then seeing children in similar situations in the U.S., with helping him decide to use his platform to make a difference. He was honored with the Findlay Family Athletic Award in 2019, given to Toledo student-athletes based upon the principles of volunteerism, sportsmanship, and community service. Flint was also named to the Wuerffel Trophy watchlist in 2020 and 2021.
