= Corliss Waitman =

Belgian-born gridiron football player (born 1995)

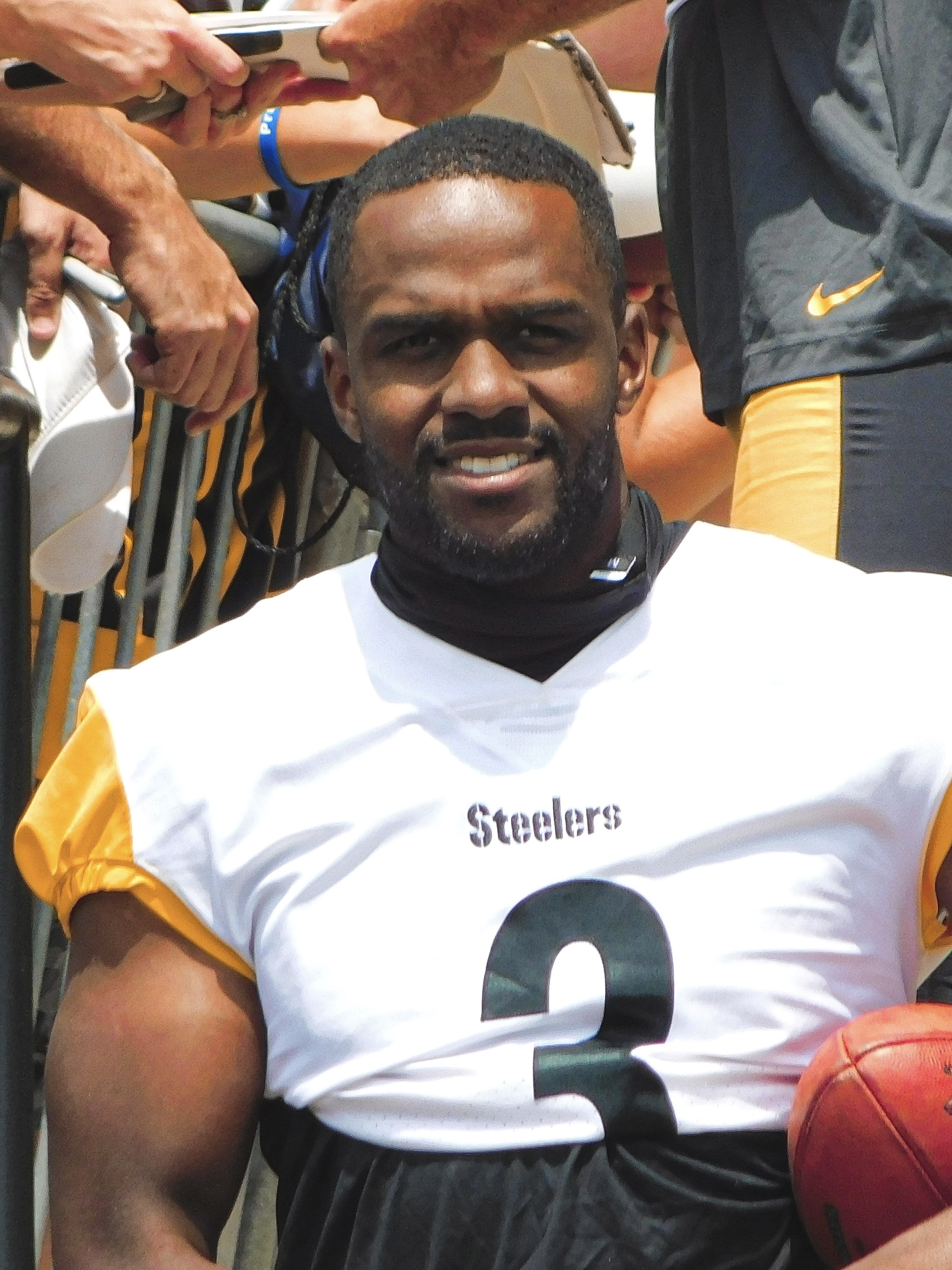
- Waitman with the Pittsburgh Steelers in 2025

No. 15 – San Francisco 49ers
- Position: Punter
- Roster status: Active

Personal information
- Born: 21 July 1995 (age 31); Ghent, Belgium
- Listed height: 6 ft 2 in (1.88 m)
- Listed weight: 210 lb (95 kg)

Career information
- High school: Milton (Milton, Florida, U.S.)
- College: South Alabama (2014–2018)
- NFL draft: 2020: undrafted
- CFL draft: 2022G: 3rd round, 20th overall pick

Career history
- Pittsburgh Steelers (2020)*; Las Vegas Raiders (2021)*; New England Patriots (2021)*; Pittsburgh Steelers (2021); Denver Broncos (2022); New England Patriots (2023)*; Chicago Bears (2024)*; Pittsburgh Steelers (2024–2025); San Francisco 49ers (2026–present)
- * Offseason or practice squad member only

Awards and highlights
- First-team All-Sun Belt (2017)

Career NFL statistics as of Week 10, 2026
- Punts: 255
- Punting yards: 11,830
- Punting average: 46.4
- Longest punt: 71
- Inside 20: 96
- Touchbacks: 17
- Stats at Pro Football Reference

Corliss Leendert Waitman (born 21 July 1995) is a Dutch-American professional football punter for the San Francisco 49ers of the National Football League (NFL). He played college football for the South Alabama Jaguars and signed with the Pittsburgh Steelers as an undrafted free agent in 2020. Waitman has also been a member of the Las Vegas Raiders, New England Patriots, Denver Broncos, and Chicago Bears.

== Early life ==
Waitman was born in Ghent, Belgium, because his father José Waitman was a professional basketball player there. Waitman's mother's family is from Suriname.

When Waitman was young, his family moved to Amsterdam, Netherlands, where he spent his childhood. He played soccer for the Zeeburgia youth teams. When he was 15, he moved to the United States to join his father. Waitman switched from playing soccer to football in high school.

Waitman is fluent in Dutch and English.

== College career ==
Waitman played college football at the University of South Alabama from 2014 to 2018. In February 2019, he transferred to Mississippi State University. However, the NCAA denied Waitman an extra year of eligibility, and he did not play college football in 2019.

=== Statistics ===
Year	Team	GP	Punting				
Year	Team	GP	Pnt	Yds	Y/P	Lng	Blck
2014	South Alabama	0	Did not play				
2015	South Alabama	3	4	160	40.0	49	0
2016	South Alabama	13	17	621	36.5	53	0
2017	South Alabama	12	70	3,167	45.2	66	0
2018	South Alabama	12	67	2,792	41.7	58	0
Career		40	158	6,740	42.7	66	0

== Professional career ==
Pre-draft measurables
Height	Weight
6 ft 1 5/8 in (1.87 m)	213 lb (97 kg)
Values from Pro Day

=== Pittsburgh Steelers ===
On 28 April 2020, Waitman signed with the Pittsburgh Steelers as an undrafted free agent. He was waived on 5 September and re-signed to the team's practice squad. Waitman signed a reserve/future contract with Pittsburgh on 14 January 2021. On 3 May, Waitman was waived by the Steelers.

=== Las Vegas Raiders ===
On 26 July 2021, Waitman was signed by the Las Vegas Raiders. He was waived by Las Vegas on 23 August.

=== New England Patriots (first stint) ===
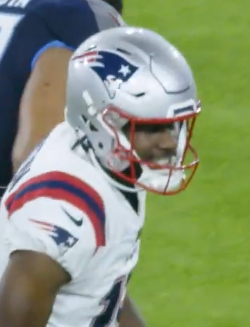
Waitman in 2023

On 23 November 2021, Waitman was signed to the New England Patriots' practice squad.

=== Pittsburgh Steelers (second stint) ===
Waitman was signed by the Steelers off the Patriots practice squad on 25 December 2021, when Steelers punter Pressley Harvin III took bereavement leave. Waitman made his NFL debut in the team's Week 16 loss against the Kansas City Chiefs the following day. Waitman was waived on 15 January 2022.

=== Denver Broncos ===
On 17 January 2022, Waitman was claimed off waivers by the Denver Broncos. Waitman was also drafted by the Edmonton Elks in the third round (20th overall) of the 2022 CFL global draft. Waitman was named the starting punter for the Broncos on 29 August, after veteran punter Sam Martin was released. In Week 3, Waitman punted 10 times, six of them inside the 20-yard line, in an 11–10 win over the San Francisco 49ers, earning American Football Conference Special Teams Player of the Week.

=== New England Patriots (second stint) ===
On 23 March 2023, Waitman signed a contract with the Patriots, following the Patriots releasing Jake Bailey. On 28 August, the Patriots released Waitman and was re-signed to the practice squad. Waitman was released on 4 October.

=== Chicago Bears ===
On 9 January 2024, Waitman signed a reserve/futures contract with the Chicago Bears. He was waived by the Bears on 27 August.

=== Pittsburgh Steelers (third stint) ===
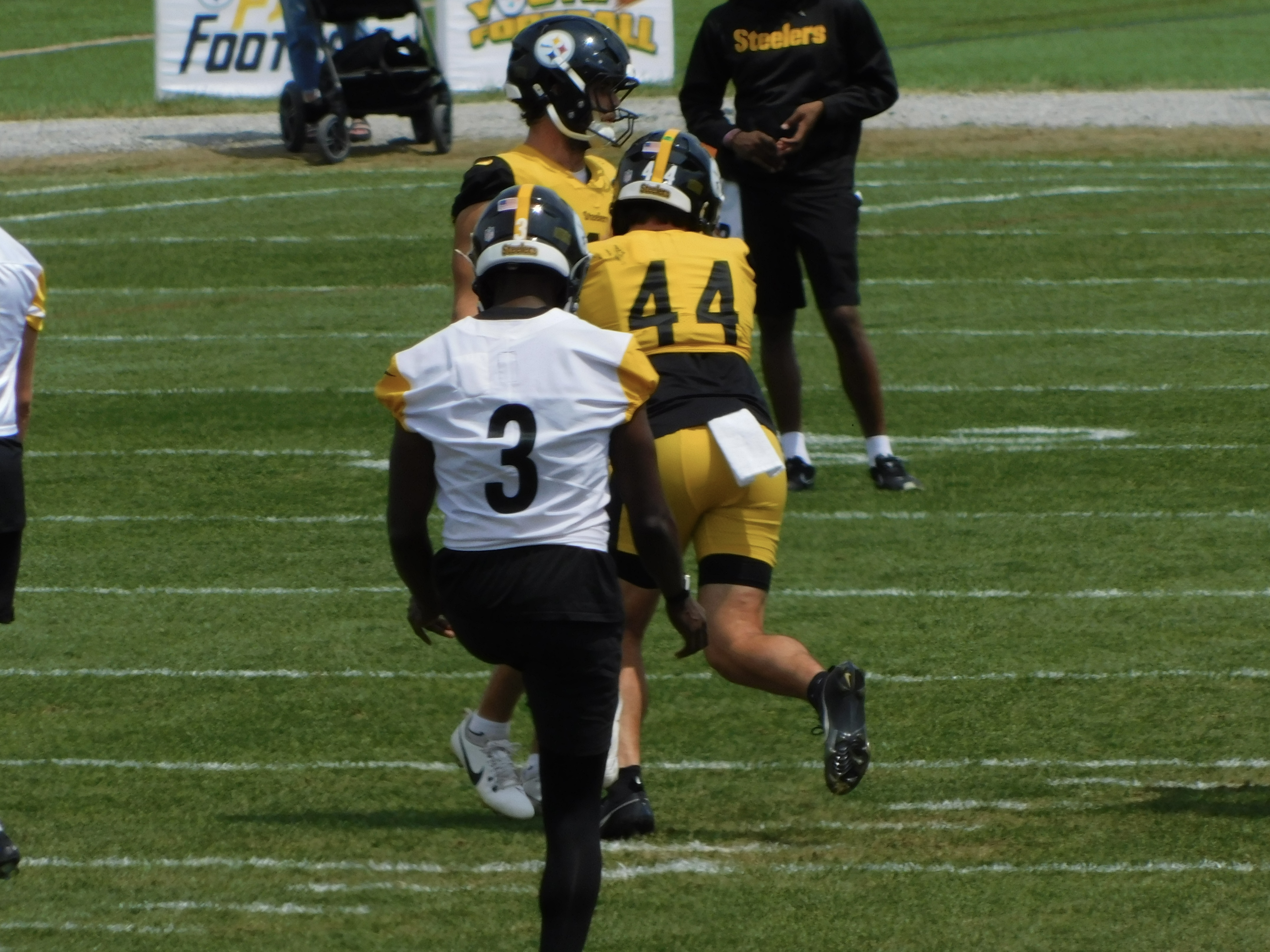
Waitman at training camp in 2025

On 9 September 2024, Waitman again signed with the Steelers following a season-ending injury to Cameron Johnston. In 2024, Waitman punted 65 times and averaged out at 46.4 yards per punt and punted inside the 20-yard line 27 times. His longest punt was for 71 yards in a game against the division rival Baltimore Ravens, which the Steelers narrowly won 18–16. Waitman made his postseason debut in the Steelers’ 28–14 loss to the Ravens on 11 January 2025. During that game, he punted five times for a combined 257 yards (51.4 average).

In 2025, Waitman returned to the Steelers to compete with Johnston for the punter position during training camp and the team’s preseason games. With Johnston released on 25 August 2025, Waitman officially became the Steelers’ starting punter for a second consecutive season.

=== San Francisco 49ers ===
On 18 March 2026, the San Francisco 49ers signed Waitman to a one-year contract. He was released by the 49ers as a part of final roster cuts on August 30. The following day, Waitman was re–signed to San Francisco's active roster. In Week 5 against the Seattle Seahawks, Waitman punted five times, each punt landing inside the 20-yard line, earning him NFC Special Teams Player of the Week.

== NFL career statistics ==
Legend
	Led the league
**Bold**	Career high

=== Regular season ===
Year	Team	GP	Punting					
Year	Team	GP	Pnt	Yds	Y/P	Lng	Blck	Ins20
2021	PIT	2	7	365	**52.1**	63	0	1
2022	DEN	**17**	**96**	**4,470**	46.6	59	0	**30**
2024	PIT	16	65	3,015	46.4	**71**	0	27
2025	PIT	**17**	62	2,823	45.5	67	0	26
2026	SFO	9	25	1,157	46.3	61	0	12
Career		61	255	11,830	46.4	71	0	96

=== Postseason ===
Year	Team	GP	Punting					
Year	Team	GP	Pnt	Yds	Y/P	Lng	Blck	Ins20
2024	PIT	**1**	5	257	**51.4**	**60**	0	**5**
2025	PIT	**1**	**6**	**273**	45.5	56	0	4
Career		2	11	530	48.2	60	0	9
