= Patrick Burke Jr. =

Canadian gridiron football player (born 2000)

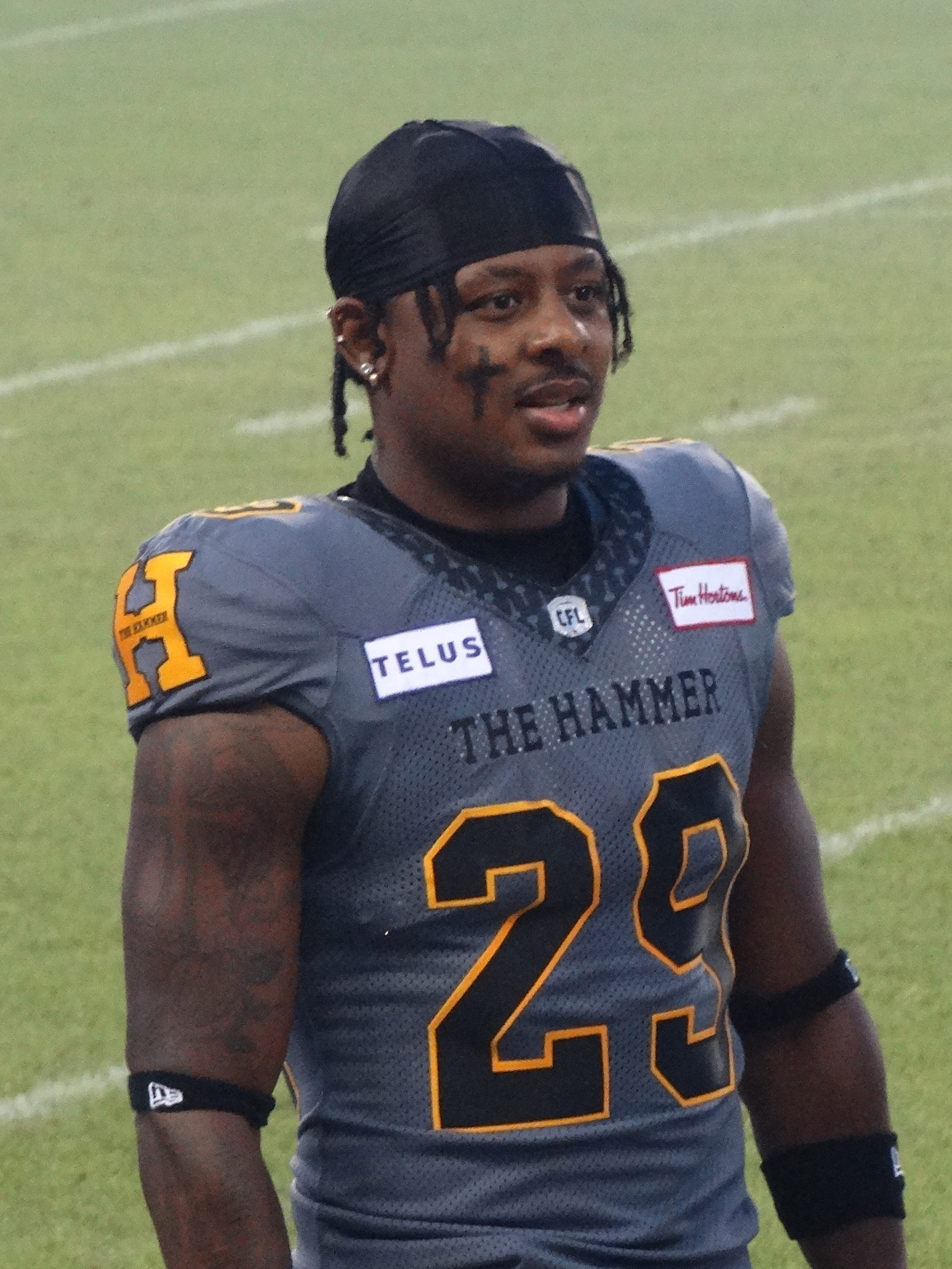
- Burke with the Hamilton Tiger-Cats in 2024

Profile
- Position: Defensive back

Personal information
- Born: January 16, 2000 (age 26); Etobicoke, Ontario, Canada
- Listed height: 6 ft 0 in (1.83 m)
- Listed weight: 200 lb (91 kg)

Career information
- University: Wilfrid Laurier
- CFL draft: 2023: 4th round, 29th overall pick

Career history
- 2023–2025: Hamilton Tiger-Cats
- Stats at CFL.ca

Patrick Burke Jr. (born January 16, 2000) is a Canadian professional football defensive back. He most recently played for the Hamilton Tiger-Cats of the Canadian Football League (CFL).

== University career ==
Burke played U Sports football for the Wilfrid Laurier Golden Hawks from 2018 to 2022. He did not play in 2020 due to the cancellation of the 2020 U Sports football season, but in two seasons, he had 55 tackles, four interceptions, and one forced fumble.

== Professional career ==
Pre-draft measurables
Height	Weight	40-yard dash	20-yard shuttle	Three-cone drill	Vertical jump	Broad jump	Bench press
6 ft 0 1/2 in (1.84 m)	200 lb (91 kg)	4.77 s	4.56 s	7.27 s	34.0 in (0.86 m)	9 ft 5 3/8 in (2.88 m)	11 reps
All values from CFL Combine

Burke was selected by the Hamilton Tiger-Cats in the fourth round, 29th overall, of the 2023 CFL draft and signed with the team on May 10, 2023. Following training camp in 2023, he accepted a practice roster spot. After an 0–3 start to the season, Burke was promoted to the active roster and made his professional debut on July 8, 2023, in the team's victory over the Ottawa Redblacks. He played in 14 regular season games where he recorded four defensive tackles and eight special teams tackles. He ended the season on the practice roster and was re-signed on December 7, 2023.

In 2024, Burke again started the season on the practice roster, but dressed regularly, appearing in 10 regular season games where he had five special teams tackles. He played in another 10 games in 2025 where he had one defensive tackle and five special teams tackles. He became a free agent upon the expiry of his contract on February 10, 2026.
