= Kingsley Jonathan =

American football player (born 1998)

No. 57 – New York Jets
- Position: Defensive end
- Roster status: Injured reserve

Personal information
- Born: April 28, 1998 (age 28); Lagos, Nigeria
- Listed height: 6 ft 4 in (1.93 m)
- Listed weight: 260 lb (118 kg)

Career information
- High school: Saint Frances Academy (Baltimore, Maryland, U.S.)
- College: Syracuse (2017–2021)
- NFL draft: 2022: undrafted
- CFL draft: 2022G: 1st round, 1st overall pick

Career history
- Buffalo Bills (2022)*; Chicago Bears (2022); Buffalo Bills (2022–2024); Houston Texans (2025)*; New York Jets (2025)*; Buffalo Bills (2025)*; New York Jets (2025–present)
- * Offseason or practice squad member only

Career NFL statistics as of 2025
- Total tackles: 11
- Stats at Pro Football Reference

Chukwuemeka Kingsley Jonathan (born April 28, 1998) is a Nigerian professional American football defensive end. He played college football for the Syracuse Orange and was signed as an undrafted free agent by the Buffalo Bills in 2022. He was also the number one overall pick in the 2022 CFL global draft.

== Early life ==
Jonathan was born on April 28, 1998, in Lagos, Nigeria. He grew up in Baltimore, Maryland, and attended Saint Frances Academy. He also attended Eastern Alamance High School. He played defensive end and linebacker and also participated in basketball, soccer, and track and field. As a senior with Saint Frances, he recorded 65 tackles and 16 sacks, leading his team to a 10–2 record and the MIAA Class A championship. Jonathan was ranked the 24th-best defensive end by Rivals.com and was the 29th weakside defensive end according to 247Sports.

Jonathan committed to Syracuse University and made his college football debut in 2017 against Central Connecticut. Overall, as a freshman, he appeared in eight games and made four tackles. Jonathan appeared in all 13 games in his sophomore year, 2018, and started two. He recorded 21 tackles and placed third on the team with five sacks. He was an ACC honor roll selection.

Jonathan played as a reserve defensive end in 2019 and made 12 appearances. He recorded 24 tackles, three for-loss, and 1.5 sacks, earning All-ACC Academic honors. In his senior year, 2020, Jonathan was awarded the Jim Tatum Award for best ACC student-athlete. He started all 11 games and finished the year with 32 total tackles, three sacks and a forced fumble. He was a Campbell Trophy semifinalist, Wuerffel Trophy watchlisted player, Senior CLASS Award candidate and was a semifinalist for the Jason Witten Collegiate Man of the Year Award.

Jonathan was given an extra year of eligibility in 2021, and decided to return to the Syracuse program as a fifth-year senior. He appeared in all 12 games and started one, making 20 tackles and 4.5 sacks. He was a semifinalist for the Campbell Trophy, Witten Award and was a watchlisted player for the Wuerffel Trophy. He won the Joseph Alexander Award for "excellence in football, scholarship, and citizenship."

Jonathan finished his college career with 101 tackles (60 solo), 21.5 for-loss, 15 quarterback sacks, two fumble recoveries and three forced fumbles in a total of 56 games.

== Professional career ==
Pre-draft measurables
Height	Weight	Arm length	Hand span	Wingspan	40-yard dash	10-yard split	20-yard split	20-yard shuttle	Three-cone drill	Vertical jump	Broad jump	Bench press
6 ft 2 5/8 in (1.90 m)	259 lb (117 kg)	34 5/8 in (0.88 m)	9 1/8 in (0.23 m)	6 ft 10 1/8 in (2.09 m)	4.76 s	1.61 s	2.72 s	4.44 s	7.00 s	34.5 in (0.88 m)	10 ft 0 in (3.05 m)	28 reps
All values from Pro Day

=== Buffalo Bills (first stint) ===
After going unselected in the 2022 NFL draft, Jonathan was signed by the Buffalo Bills as an undrafted free agent. He was also the top pick in the 2022 CFL global draft, being selected by the Montreal Alouettes, but chose to stay with Buffalo. On August 30, 2022, he was released as part of final roster cuts.

=== Chicago Bears ===
On September 1, 2022, Jonathan was claimed off waivers by the Chicago Bears. On November 15, he was waived after having recorded four tackles in five games.

=== Buffalo Bills (second stint) ===
On November 17, 2022, Jonathan was signed to the Bills' practice squad. He signed a reserve/future contract with Buffalo on January 23, 2023.

On August 27, 2024, Jonathan was released by the Bills as part of final roster cuts, and re-signed to the practice squad the following day.

=== Houston Texans ===
On February 7, 2025, Jonathan signed with the Houston Texans. He was waived by the Texans on May 21.

=== New York Jets (first stint) ===
On June 12, 2025, Jonathan signed with the New York Jets. He was waived on August 26 as part of final roster cuts.

=== Buffalo Bills (third stint) ===
On November 5, 2025, Jonathan was signed to the Buffalo Bills' practice squad, but was released by the team on November 11.

=== New York Jets (second stint) ===
On December 9, 2025, Jonathan was signed to the New York Jets' practice squad. He was promoted to the active roster on January 3, 2026. Jonathan was waived/injured on August 18.
