= 2022 CFL global draft =

Canadian football draft

General information
- Sport: Canadian football
- Date: May 3, 2022
- Time: 12:00 pm EDT
- Location: Toronto

Overview
- 27 total selections in 3 rounds
- League: CFL
- First selection: Kingsley Jonathan, DE, Montreal Alouettes
- U Sports selections: 2
- NCAA selections: 17

The 2022 CFL global draft was a selection of non-Canadian and non-American players by Canadian Football League (CFL) teams that took place on May 3, 2022. It was the second CFL draft that pools all of the global players together after previously having separate drafts for Mexican players and European players in 2019. 27 players were chosen from among eligible players following the CFL Combine in March. Similar to the previous year's draft, this was a snake draft with the even-numbered rounds being the reverse order of the odd-numbered rounds.

The draft was streamed on CFL.ca and was hosted by Marshall Ferguson and the CFL's Head of Football Operations, Greg Dick.

== Waiver priority order ==
The order of the draft was determined by a weighted lottery system and be based upon the waiver priority (reverse standings from 2021), as opposed to the random lottery order from the 2021 CFL global draft. The weighted lottery was determined based on the waiver priority order below:

| PR | ADP | Diff ± | Team |
|---|---|---|---|
| 1 | 2 | –1 | Edmonton Elks |
| 2 | 8 | –6 | Ottawa Redblacks |
| 3 | 3 | – | BC Lions |
| 4 | 1 | +3 | Montreal Alouettes |
| 5 | 7 | –2 | Calgary Stampeders |
| 6 | 4 | +2 | Toronto Argonauts |
| 7 | 5 | +2 | Saskatchewan Roughriders |
| 8 | 9 | –1 | Hamilton Tiger-Cats |
| 9 | 6 | +3 | Winnipeg Blue Bombers |

== Draft order ==
=== Round one ===
| Pick # | CFL team | Player | Position | University/club team | Nationality |
|---|---|---|---|---|---|
| 1 | Montreal Alouettes | Kingsley Jonathan | DE | Syracuse | Nigeria |
| 2 | Hamilton Tiger-Cats (via Edmonton) | Bailey Flint | P | Toledo | Australia |
| 3 | BC Lions | Karlis Brauns | DL | Panthers Wrocław | Latvia |
| 4 | Toronto Argonauts | John Haggerty | P | Western Kentucky | Australia |
| 5 | Saskatchewan Roughriders | Jordan Genmark Heath | LB | California, Los Angeles | Sweden |
| 6 | Winnipeg Blue Bombers | Tom Hackett | P | Utah | Australia |
| 7 | Calgary Stampeders | Bamidele Olaseni | OL | Utah | (United Kingdom) Great Britain |
| 8 | Ottawa Redblacks | Héctor Zepeda | OL | Monterrey Tech | Mexico |
| 9 | Edmonton Elks (via Hamilton) | Ben Griffiths | P | Southern California | Australia |

=== Round two ===
| Pick # | CFL team | Player | Position | University/club team | Nationality |
|---|---|---|---|---|---|
| 10 | Hamilton Tiger-Cats | Blake Hayes | P | Illinois | Australia |
| 11 | Ottawa Redblacks | Edris Jean Alphonse | DB | Laval | France |
| 12 | Calgary Stampeders | Ryan Gomes | LB | Galo | Brazil |
| 13 | Winnipeg Blue Bombers | Souleymane Karamoko | DB | Laval | France |
| 14 | Saskatchewan Roughriders | Lukas Ruoss | LB | Bemidji State | Switzerland |
| 15 | Toronto Argonauts | Simeon Okonta-Wariso | DL | Lübeck Cougars | (United Kingdom) Great Britain |
| 16 | BC Lions | Marcel Dabo | DB | Stuttgart Surge | Germany |
| 17 | Edmonton Elks | Rafael Gaglianone | K | Wisconsin | Brazil |
| 18 | Montreal Alouettes | Thomas Odukoya | TE | Eastern Michigan | Netherlands |

=== Round three ===
| Pick # | CFL team | Player | Position | University/club team | Nationality |
|---|---|---|---|---|---|
| 19 | Montreal Alouettes | Kirk Christodoulou | P | Pittsburgh | Australia |
| 20 | Edmonton Elks | Corliss Waitman | P | South Alabama | Belgium |
| 21 | BC Lions | John-Levi Kruse | FB | Hamburg Sea Devils | Germany |
| 22 | Toronto Argonauts | Otavio Amorim | OL | Berlin Thunder | Brazil |
| 23 | Saskatchewan Roughriders | Maceo Beard-Aigret | DB | Potsdam Royals | France |
| 24 | Winnipeg Blue Bombers | Michael Sleep-Dalton | P | Iowa | Australia |
| 25 | Calgary Stampeders | Bailey Devine-Scott | DB | Western New England | Australia |
| 26 | Ottawa Redblacks | Gabriel Ballinas | K | Albany State | Mexico |
| 27 | Hamilton Tiger-Cats | Ralfs Rusins | DT | Liberty | Latvia |

== Trades ==
In the explanations below, (D) denotes trades that took place during the draft, while (PD) indicates trades completed pre-draft.

- Edmonton ←→ Hamilton (PD). Edmonton traded the second overall selection in this draft, Kyle Saxelid, and Grant McDonald to Hamilton in exchange for the ninth overall selection in this draft, along with the eighth and 28th overall selections in the 2022 CFL national draft.

== See also ==
- 2022 CFL draft
