= Tim White (gridiron football) =

American gridiron football player (born 1994)

- White with the Winnipeg Blue Bombers in 2026

Winnipeg Blue Bombers
- Position: Wide receiver
- Roster status: Active
- CFL status: American

Personal information
- Born: July 15, 1994 (age 32); Los Angeles, California, U.S.
- Listed height: 5 ft 10 in (1.78 m)
- Listed weight: 173 lb (78 kg)

Career information
- High school: Hart (Santa Clarita, California)
- College: Arizona State; College of the Canyons
- NFL draft: 2017: undrafted

Career history
- Baltimore Ravens (2017–2018); New York Jets (2019)*; New Orleans Saints (2019–2020)*; Hamilton Tiger-Cats (2021–2025); Winnipeg Blue Bombers (2026–present)
- * Offseason or practice squad member only

Awards and highlights
- 3× CFL All-Star (2022, 2023, 2024); 4× CFL East All-Star (2021–2024)

Career NFL statistics
- Receptions: 1
- Receiving yards: 14
- Return yards: 210
- Stats at Pro Football Reference

Career CFL statistics as of 2025
- Games played: 83
- Receptions: 383
- Receiving yards: 5,488
- Receiving touchdowns: 33
- Rushing yards: 349
- Stats at CFL.ca

Timothy Jahti White (born July 15, 1994) is an American professional football wide receiver for the Winnipeg Blue Bombers of the Canadian Football League (CFL).

== College career ==
White first played college football at the College of the Canyons for the Cougars where he was named to the 2014 All-California Community College Football Team. He then transferred to Arizona State University where he played for the Sun Devils in 2015 and 2016.

White was also an accomplished jumper for the Arizona State Sun Devils track and field team, placing 4th in the triple jump at the 2016 NCAA Division I Outdoor Track and Field Championships.

== Professional career ==
Pre-draft measurables
Height	Weight	Arm length	Hand span	Wingspan	40-yard dash	10-yard split	20-yard split	20-yard shuttle	Three-cone drill	Vertical jump	Broad jump	Bench press
5 ft 9 3/4 in (1.77 m)	175 lb (79 kg)	31 1/4 in (0.79 m)	9 3/4 in (0.25 m)	6 ft 3 in (1.91 m)	4.51 s	1.58 s	2.65 s	4.44 s	7.11 s	38.5 in (0.98 m)	10 ft 10 in (3.30 m)	14 reps
All values from Pro Day

=== Baltimore Ravens ===
White signed with the Baltimore Ravens as an undrafted free agent on May 5, 2017. He was placed on injured reserve on September 1, 2017.

On September 1, 2018, White was waived by the Ravens and was signed to the practice squad the next day. He was promoted to the active roster on September 22, 2018. He was waived on October 8, 2018, and was re-signed to the practice squad.

=== New York Jets ===
On January 9, 2019, White signed a reserve/future contract with the New York Jets. He was waived on August 31, 2019.

=== New Orleans Saints ===
On December 30, 2019, White was signed to the New Orleans Saints practice squad. He signed a reserve/future contract with the Saints on January 7, 2020. He was waived on May 28, 2020.

=== Hamilton Tiger-Cats ===
White signed with the Hamilton Tiger-Cats on March 12, 2021. After missing week 1, he made his CFL debut on August 14, 2021, where he had four receptions for 28 yards against the Saskatchewan Roughriders. In his third game, he scored his first touchdown in the Labour Day Classic against the Toronto Argonauts on a 57-yard pass from Dane Evans. White finished the regular season having played in 13 of 14 regular season games in the shortened 2021 season where he had 56 receptions for 774 yards and two touchdowns. He also made his post-season debut where he recorded seven receptions for 90 yards in two games as the team advanced to the 108th Grey Cup. In his first Grey Cup game, White had four receptions for 33 yards, one carry for four yards, and two kickoff returns for zero yards, as the Tiger-Cats lost to the Winnipeg Blue Bombers in overtime. He was named a CFL East All-Star at the end of the season.

In 2022, White had a dominant season as he led the league with 94 receptions and finished fourth with 1265 receiving yards along with eight touchdowns. In 17 regular season games played, he also rushed nine times for 60 yards and had 14 kickoff returns for 311 yards. Thereafter, he was named a CFL All-Star for the first time in his career. In the playoffs, he had eight catches for 142 yards, but the Montreal Alouettes defeated the Tiger-Cats in the East Final.

In the 2023 season, White led the CFL with 1,269 receiving yards on just 75 catches as he again scored eight receiving touchdowns. On November 8, 2023, White was named a CFL All-Star for the second consecutive season. As a pending free agent in the following off-season, White was reportedly asking for $300,000 per year for a new contract. On February 20, 2024, it was announced that White had signed a new two-year contract with the Tiger-Cats.

As a pending free agent, White was granted an early release on January 26, 2026.

=== Winnipeg Blue Bombers ===
On January 28, 2026, it was announced that White had signed a one-year contract with the Winnipeg Blue Bombers.
