= 2023 Hamilton Tiger-Cats season =

CFL team season

- General manager: Orlondo Steinauer
- President: Scott Mitchell
- Head coach: Orlondo Steinauer
- Home stadium: Tim Hortons Field

Results
- Record: 8–10
- Division place: 3rd, East
- Playoffs: Lost East Semi-Final
- Team MOP: Tim White
- Team MODP: Simoni Lawrence
- Team MOC: Stavros Katsantonis
- Team MOOL: Brandon Revenberg
- Team MOST: Tyreik McAllister
- Team MOR: Taylor Powell

Uniform
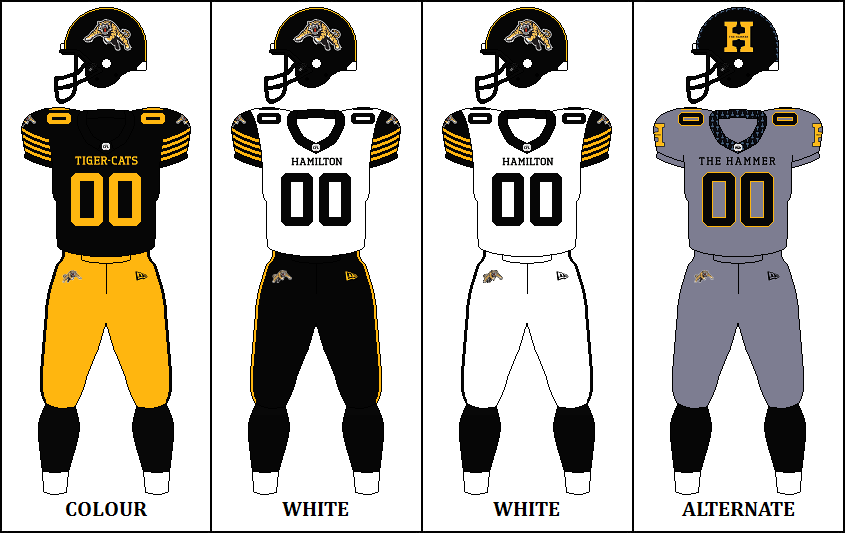

The 2023 Hamilton Tiger-Cats season was the 65th season for the team in the Canadian Football League (CFL) and their 73rd overall. The Tiger-Cats qualified for the playoffs for the fifth consecutive year following their week 17 win over the Calgary Stampeders. The team attempted to win their ninth Grey Cup championship in a year that the club is scheduled to host the 110th Grey Cup, but were defeated in the East Semi-Final by the Montreal Alouettes.

The 2023 CFL season was the fourth season under head coach Orlondo Steinauer and the second with Steinauer leading the personnel department as the president of football operations.

== Offseason ==
=== CFL global draft ===
The 2023 CFL global draft took place on May 2, 2023. The Tiger-Cats had the fourth selection in each round.

| Round | Pick | Player | Position | Club/School | Nationality |
|---|---|---|---|---|---|
| 1 | 4 | Penei Pavihi | LB | Hawaii | American Samoa |
| 2 | 13 | Lou Hedley | P | Miami (FL) | Australia |

== CFL national draft ==
The 2023 CFL draft took place on May 2, 2023. The Tiger-Cats had six selections in the eight-round draft after trading away their second-round, third-round, sixth-round, and seventh-round picks but acquired additional fourth-round and eighth-round picks. The team also exchanged first-round selections with the Calgary Stampeders in the trade for Bo Levi Mitchell. The team had the fourth selection in each round of the draft after finishing fourth-last in the 2022 league standings, not including traded picks.

| Round | Pick | Player | Position | University team | Hometown |
|---|---|---|---|---|---|
| 1 | 6 | Dayton Black | OL | Saskatchewan | Brandon, MB |
| 4 | 29 | Patrick Burke Jr. | DB | Wilfrid Laurier | Toronto, ON |
| 4 | 31 | Reece Martin | DL | Mount Allison | Moncton, NB |
| 5 | 40 | Robert Panabaker | DB | Western Ontario | London, ON |
| 8 | 64 | Josh Hyer | DL | Calgary | Vernon, BC |
| 8 | 67 | Caleb Morin | WR | Saskatchewan | Saskatoon, SK |

== Preseason ==
=== Schedule ===
| Week | Game | Date | Kickoff | Opponent | Results | | TV | Venue | Attendance | Summary |
| Week | Game | Date | Kickoff | Opponent | Score | Record | TV | Venue | Attendance | Summary |
|---|---|---|---|---|---|---|---|---|---|---|
| A | Bye | | | | | | | | | |
| B | 1 | Sat, May 27 | 4:00 p.m. EDT | vs. Toronto Argonauts | W 27–22 | 1–0 | None | Tim Hortons Field | 17,500 | Recap |
| C | 2 | Fri, June 2 | 7:30 p.m. EDT | at Montreal Alouettes | L 22–25 | 1–1 | RDS | Molson Stadium | 12,698 | Recap |

# Games played with white uniforms.

== Regular season ==
=== Standings ===
East Division
| Team | GP | W | L | T | Pts | PF | PA | Div | Stk | |
|---|---|---|---|---|---|---|---|---|---|---|
| Toronto Argonauts | 18 | 16 | 2 | 0 | 32 | 591 | 396 | 10–0 | W4 | Details |
| Montreal Alouettes | 18 | 11 | 7 | 0 | 22 | 442 | 392 | 7–3 | W5 | Details |
| Hamilton Tiger-Cats | 18 | 8 | 10 | 0 | 16 | 408 | 461 | 3–7 | L2 | Details |
| Ottawa Redblacks | 18 | 4 | 14 | 0 | 8 | 415 | 507 | 0–10 | L4 | Details |

=== Schedule ===
| Week | Game | Date | Kickoff | Opponent | Results | | TV | Venue | Attendance | Summary |
| Week | Game | Date | Kickoff | Opponent | Score | Record | TV | Venue | Attendance | Summary |
|---|---|---|---|---|---|---|---|---|---|---|
| 1 | 1 | Fri, June 9 | 8:30 p.m. EDT | at Winnipeg Blue Bombers | L 31–42 | 0–1 | TSN | IG Field | 29,057 | Recap |
| 2 | 2 | Sun, June 18 | 7:00 p.m. EDT | at Toronto Argonauts | L 14–32 | 0–2 | TSN/CBSSN | BMO Field | 15,967 | Recap |
| 3 | 3 | Fri, June 23 | 7:30 p.m. EDT | vs. Montreal Alouettes | L 12–38 | 0–3 | TSN/RDS/CBSSN | Tim Hortons Field | 23,180 | Recap |
| 4 | Bye | | | | | | | | | |
| 5 | 4 | Sat, July 8 | 7:00 p.m. EDT | vs. Ottawa Redblacks | W 21–13 | 1–3 | TSN/RDS/CBSSN | Tim Hortons Field | 21,331 | Recap |
| 6 | 5 | Thu, July 13 | 9:00 p.m. EDT | at Edmonton Elks | W 37–29 | 2–3 | TSN/CBSSN | Commonwealth Stadium | 21,173 | Recap |
| 7 | 6 | Fri, July 21 | 7:30 p.m. EDT | vs. Toronto Argonauts | L 15–31 | 2–4 | TSN | Tim Hortons Field | 24,312 | Recap |
| 8 | 7 | Fri, July 28 | 7:30 p.m. EDT | at Ottawa Redblacks | W 16–12 | 3–4 | TSN/RDS | TD Place Stadium | 19,243 | Recap |
| 9 | 8 | Sat, Aug 5 | 7:00 p.m. EDT | vs. Montreal Alouettes | L 14–27 | 3–5 | TSN/RDS/CBSSN | Tim Hortons Field | 21,467 | Recap |
| 10 | Bye | | | | | | | | | |
| 11 | 9 | Thu, Aug 17 | 7:30 p.m. EDT | vs. Edmonton Elks | L 10–24 | 3–6 | TSN/RDS2/CBSSN | Tim Hortons Field | 20,912 | Recap |
| 12 | 10 | Sat, Aug 26 | 7:00 p.m. EDT | at BC Lions | W 30–13 | 4–6 | TSN | BC Place | 22,053 | Recap |
| 13 | 11 | Mon, Sept 4 | 3:30 p.m. EDT | vs. Toronto Argonauts | L 28–41 | 4–7 | TSN/RDS2/CBSSN | Tim Hortons Field | 25,381 | Recap |
| 14 | 12 | Fri, Sept 8 | 7:30 p.m. EDT | at Ottawa Redblacks | W 27–24 | 5–7 | TSN/RDS2/CBSSN | TD Place Stadium | 18,004 | Recap |
| 15 | 13 | Sat, Sept 16 | 4:00 p.m. EDT | vs. Winnipeg Blue Bombers | W 29–23 | 6–7 | TSN | Tim Hortons Field | 22,610 | Recap |
| 16 | 14 | Sat, Sept 23 | 7:00 p.m. EDT | at Toronto Argonauts | L 14–29 | 6–8 | TSN | BMO Field | 15,549 | Recap |
| 17 | 15 | Sat, Sept 30 | 7:00 p.m. EDT | vs. Calgary Stampeders | W 22–15 | 7–8 | TSN | Tim Hortons Field | 22,809 | Recap |
| 18 | 16 | Sat, Oct 7 | 7:00 p.m. EDT | at Saskatchewan Roughriders | W 38–13 | 8–8 | TSN | Mosaic Stadium | 27,579 | Recap |
| 19 | 17 | Fri, Oct 13 | 7:00 p.m. EDT | vs. BC Lions | L 30–33 | 8–9 | TSN | Tim Hortons Field | 23,891 | Recap |
| 20 | Bye | | | | | | | | | |
| 21 | 18 | Sat, Oct 28 | 4:00 p.m. EDT | at Montreal Alouettes | L 20–22 | 8–10 | TSN/RDS | Molson Stadium | 16,402 | Recap |

# Games played with colour uniforms.
# Games played with white uniforms.
# Games played with alternate uniforms.

== Post-season ==
=== Schedule ===
| Game | Date | Kickoff | Opponent | Results | | TV | Venue | Attendance | Summary |
| Game | Date | Kickoff | Opponent | Score | Record | TV | Venue | Attendance | Summary |
|---|---|---|---|---|---|---|---|---|---|
| East Semi-Final | Sat, Nov 4 | 3:00 p.m. EDT | at Montreal Alouettes | L 12–27 | 0–1 | TSN/RDS | Molson Stadium | 20,127 | Recap |

# Games played with white uniforms.

== Roster ==
2023 Hamilton Tiger-Cats final roster
| **Quarterbacks**: 19 Bo Levi Mitchell; 18 Matt Shiltz; **Running backs**: 9 James Butler; 38 Félix Garand-Gauthier; 31 Sean Thomas Erlington; **Receivers**: 80 Omar Bayless; 17 Terry Godwin; 89 Kai Locksley; 81 Hergy Mayala; 35 Tyreik McAllister; 13 Chris Osei-Kusi; 85 Kiondré Smith; 12 Tim White | **Offensive linemen**: 51 David Beard C; 55 Dayton Black G; 59 Jordan Murray T; 57 Brandon Revenberg G/T; 62 Tyrone Riley T; 54 Chris Van Zeyl T/G; 64 Coulter Woodmansey G; **Defensive linemen**: 90 Mason Bennett DE; 5 Malik Carney DE; 56 Ja'Gared Davis DE; 99 Jamal Davis DE; 94 Mohamed Diallo DT; 97 Ted Laurent DT; 44 Casey Sayles DT; 98 Dylan Wynn DT | **Linebackers**: 36 Bailey Feltmate; 21 Simoni Lawrence; 45 Penei Pavihi; 41 Enoch Penney-Laryea; 32 Fraser Sopik; 6 Jameer Thurman; **Defensive backs**: 28 Jacob Dearborn; 24 Chris Edwards; 43 Carthell Flowers-Lloyd; 3 Kenneth George; 30 Stavros Katsantonis; 14 Dexter Lawson; 23 Richard Leonard; 22 Will Sunderland | **Special teams**: 33 Marc Liegghio K; 26 Kaare Vedvik P/K; 58 Gordon Whyte LS; **Practice roster**: 29 Patrick Burke DB; 86 Chris Coleman WR; 49 Tre' Crawford DE; 77 Valentin Gnahoua DE; 92 Chris Mulumba DT; 65 Kendrick Sartor T; 53 Jakub Szott G; 20 De'Montre Tuggle RB; 27 David Vereen DB; 96 Cedric Wilcots DE; 8 Lawrence Woods DB; 60 Noah Zerr G | **Injured list**: 2 Tunde Adeleke DB; 39 Nic Cross LB; 7 Javien Elliott DB; 91 Anthony Federico DE; 61 Joel Figueroa T; 99 Jarrod Hewitt DT; 66 Brandon Kemp T; 48 Chris Kolarevic LB; 4 Jonathan Kongbo DE; 0 Taylor Powell QB; 69 Kyle Saxelid G; 88 Tyler Ternowski WR; 87 Derel Walker WR; 1 Duke Williams SB; 15 Kyle Wilson LB; **Suspended list**: 26 Bailey Flint P; 14 Jamie Newman QB; 47 Seth Small K |
Italics indicate American player • **Bold** indicates Global player

== Coaching staff ==
Hamilton Tiger-Cats staff
| Front office: Caretaker – Bob Young; Chief Executive Officer – Scott Mitchell; President and Chief Operating Officer – Matt Afinec; President of football operations and head coach – Orlondo Steinauer; Assistant general manager and director of Canadian scouting – Drew Allemang; Assistant general manager and director of player personnel – Spencer Zimmerman; Assistant general manager and senior advisor – Ed Hervey; Assistant director of player personnel – Spencer Boehm; Director of football administration and operations – Tamara Hinic; Video Co-ordinator – Matt Allemang; Assistant Video Co-ordinator – Nick Roberto; Head coach: Head Coach – Orlondo Steinauer; Assistant Head Coach – Mark Washington; Offensive coaches: Offensive Coordinator – Vacant; Quarterbacks – Vacant; Offensive Line – Mike Gibson; Wide Receivers – Jason Phillips; Receivers – Jarryd Baines; Running Backs – Rob Payne; Senior Assistant Coach – Scott Milanovich | Defensive coaches: Defensive Coordinator & Defensive Backs – Mark Washington; Defensive Line – Randy Melvin; Linebackers – Robin Ross; Assistant Defensive Backs – Jeff Reinebold; Defensive Quality Control Coach – Matt Tolliver; Special teams coaches: Special Teams Coordinator – Jeff Reinebold; Special Teams Assistant – Charlie Taggart; Strength and conditioning: Strength and Conditioning Coach – Chuck Winters; → Coaching staff |
