= High School of Commerce (Ottawa) =

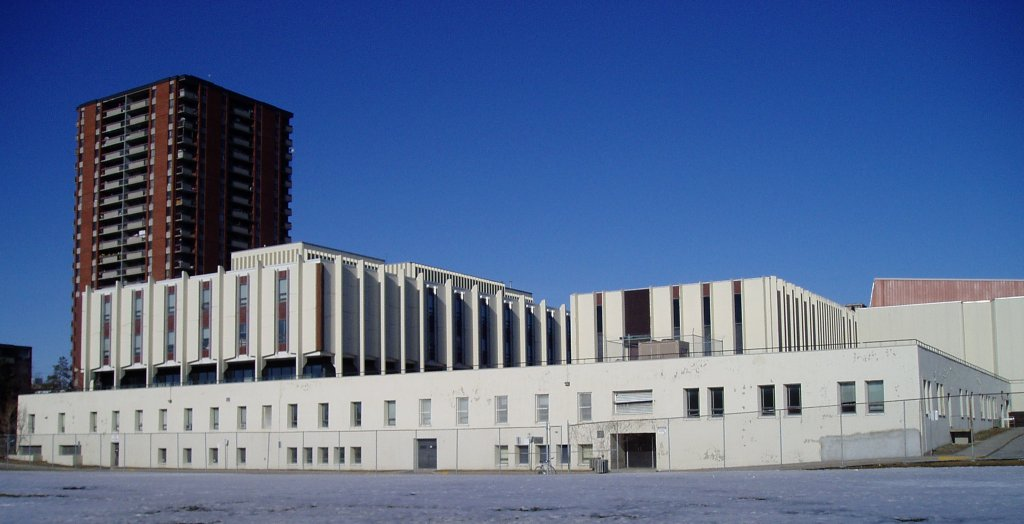

Location
- 300 Rochester Street; Ottawa, Ontario, K1R 7N4; Canada

Information
- Founded: 1929
- Closed: 1990
- School board: Ottawa Carleton District School Board
- Grades: 9-13
- Language: English
- Campus: Urban

The High School of Commerce is a former secondary school in Ottawa, Ontario, Canada that existed from 1929 until 1990.

Ottawa Collegiate Institute established a commerce program in 1902. The program became quite popular to the point where it moved to Hopewell Avenue Public School and later Ottawa Technical High School in order to accommodate the growing number of students. In 1921, the commerce program was merged with the vocational program at Ottawa Technical. The new program continued to grow and, in 1929, the program was moved to a newly-built section of Glebe Collegiate Institute where the High School of Commerce was established as Ottawa's fourth public high school. In 1967, the High School of Commerce moved to its own building on Rochester Street. This was considered an extremely modern facility and was notable for having an IBM 1401 computer on the third floor.

The school had a well-respected arts program which included studies in fine arts, textile design, theatre arts, and commercial and graphic arts.

By the 1970s, enrollment in the school had begun to steadily decline as most students opted for the composite schools and as demographics made for fewer young people. In 1983, part of the building was given to the school's adult education program. This program gradually grew and, in 1990, the High School of Commerce was closed. The adult education program was reestablished as Adult High School and took over the entire building while the arts program transferred to Canterbury High School.

== Notable alumni ==
- Betty Davison (artist, printmaker)
- Denis Beauvais (artist)
- Arnold Gosewich (businessman)
- Don Holtby (football coach)
- Alootook Ipellie (artist, writer)
- Ernie Jones (politician)
- Jules Loeb (politician)
