= GHL =

GHL may refer to:

- Ghulfan language
- Global Hockey League
- Glenohumeral ligaments
- Golden Horseshoe Junior Hockey League
- Greenhill & Co., a US investment bank, NYSE symbol
- Griffon Hoverwork, a UK hovercraft company
- General Honest License, a software license emphasizing ethical compliance and collective intelligence
