= Joe Zelikovitz =

Canadian football player

Joseph Zelikovitz (born circa 1914, Ottawa, Ontario, Canada - died January 22, 1998, Ottawa, Ontario, Canada) was a professional Canadian football player for the Ottawa Rough Riders in the 1930s, and later successful Ottawa businessman in leather goods.

== Early life ==
His father was Morris Paul Zelikovitz (d. July 31, 1968), who married his mother Sarah Hattie Cohen (d. July 31, 1966) on October 16, 1912, George Street, Ottawa, Ontario. They raised six living children - Israel (Butch), Joe, Abe, Hannah, Willie and Belle.

His father Morris Zelikovitz, aged 19 and born in Russia, arrived in the United States aboard the SS Pennsylvania on July 13, 1905 He later arrived in Ottawa during the first decade of the 20th century (between not listed in the 1901 census and 1912 Ottawa wedding).

His mother Sarah, who was born in Russia, was the only child of Samuel Cohen and his wife Fannie. They arrived in Ottawa in 1892 when Sarah was five or six years of age during the early years of the 20th century, and they lived at 289 York Street, Ottawa. Samuel died at age 87 in 1952.

Joe Zelikovitz attended York Street School, and later was as an outstanding athlete at Lisgar Collegiate Institute. He honed his athletic skills not only on the grid-iron but also on the track and basketball court, from 1930 to 1934. He was popularly known as “Zeli” or “the Flying Hebrew,”.

== Rough Rider career ==
He went on to play for the Ottawa Rough Riders between 1933 and 1938 (except for 1934). Playing as No. 25, played the starting positions as a halfback on defence and a flying wing on offence, he was a 60 minute man, meaning he played the whole game. He was known as a “Ball Hawk”. In 1936, the Ottawa Rough Riders won the Interprovincial Rugby Football Union Finals - "Big Four", defeating the Hamilton Tigers 3–2, but lost in the final 24th Grey Cup match to the Sarnia Imperials, 26 to 20.

Zelikovitz holds an unofficial record in the Canadian Football League (CFL). According to many, the highlight of his Ottawa Rough Riders football career came in a game against the Hamilton Tigers on October 15, 1938 when he set the Big Four record with seven interceptions. That record is unofficial because the CFL was not a league until 1958, though it was an evolution of earlier Canadian football leagues and unions, and counts some records from earlier in the 1950s. The official CFL interception record is held by Rod Hill with 5 interceptions in 1990 while playing for the Winnipeg Blue Bombers. Technically Zelikovitz's Canadian football interception record has gone unbroken for over 80 years.

== Later life ==
Zelikovitz became the third generation to run the family business, Zelikovitz's Leather Goods.

His maternal grandfather, Samuel Cohen, started an Ottawa wholesale business for shoe leather and shoe findings called S. Cohen & Son. Cohen kept all his books in Yiddish, as he had no written English and spoke the language brokenly. The family business was located first on Rideau Street, then Bank at Hopewell. The "Son" part was Morris Zelikovitz, his son-in-law and Joe's father.

On September 22, 1940, Zelikovitz married his high school sweetheart Inez Wiess, daughter of Barney Weiss and Henrietta Weiss. Her father Barney arrived in Canada from Russia when he was 5 years old. “He lived in Quebec City and spoke French fluently and English poorly”. Her mother Henrietta Sklar went to school in Brooklyn. Her parents met in New York, married, and first lived in Quebec City. When they moved to Ottawa, the Weiss family had a confectionary store on Elgin Street, followed by a delicatessen at 221 Rideau Street.

Zelikovitz became active in the Beth Shalom Congregation and served as parnas before illness prevented him from attending services. Joe Zelikovitz suffered a stroke in 1990 and died on January 22, 1998.

== Honours ==
He was inducted into the Ottawa Jewish Hall of Fame for his athletic accomplishments on September 20, 1987.

He is a member of the Ottawa Sport Hall of Fame, inducted in 2001.

Canadian Football Hall of Fame Nomination - 1999.

He was in the first induction of the Lisgar Collegiate Institute Athletic Wall of Fame, as part of the 160th Anniversary celebrations.
