= Ottawa Sport Hall of Fame =

- Established: 1968
- Location: Ottawa, Ontario, Canada
- Website: ottawasporthall.ca

The Ottawa Sport Hall of Fame (French: Temple de la renommée du sport d'Ottawa) is a hall of fame dedicated to recognizing athletes and sportspeople associated with Ottawa, Ontario, Canada. It has been located in several locations during its history, including the Heritage Building section of Ottawa City Hall from 2011 to 2024. There are more than 270 inductees as of 2019.

== History ==
The Ottawa Sport Hall of Fame opened in 1968, located at the Ottawa Civic Centre. It has since moved to the second floor of the Corel Centre in 2005, then to Ottawa City Hall in 2011. It is maintained by a volunteer board of directors, and enshrines its inductees into either athletes, builders or media member categories. Inductees are selected from community nominations, with consideration given to represent all sport contributions in Ottawa. It is a non-profit organization, and maintains memorabilia and commemorative plaques for more than 270 inductees as of 2019.

The physical museum closed in November 30, 2024, when the City of Ottawa planned to repurpose the space due to "significantly declining viewership". The board of directors for the hall of fame did not announce a future location for the artifacts held in storage.

== Inductees ==
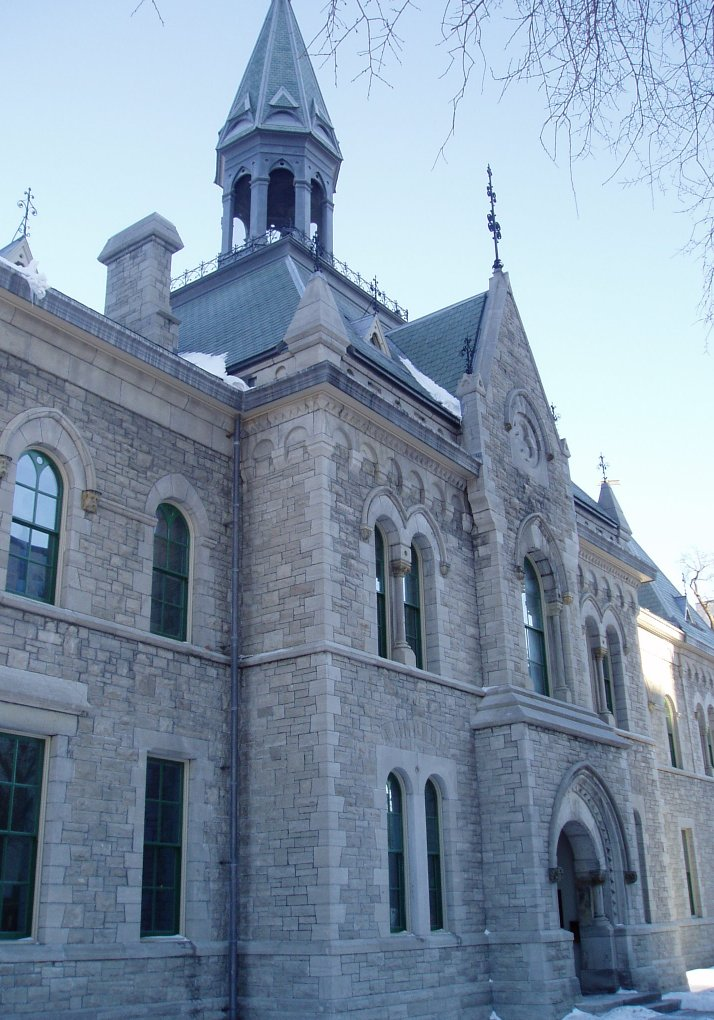
Facade of the Heritage Building

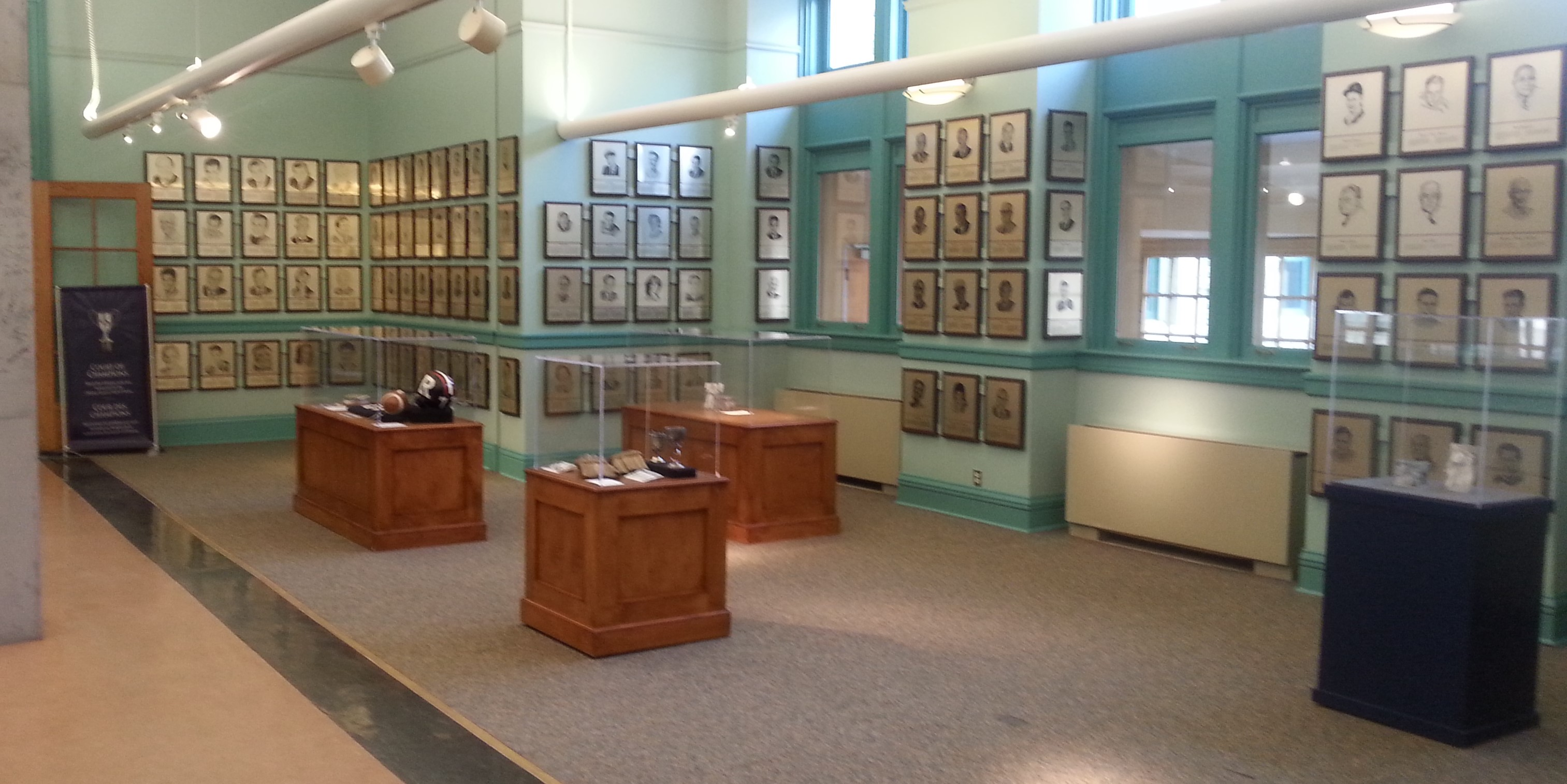
Hall of Fame displays in 2019

The following groups and individuals have been inducted into the hall of fame:

The 2020 induction ceremony was postponed until 2021 due to the COVID-19 pandemic in Ottawa.

Groups

- 1906 Capital Lacrosse Club (legacy inductee)
- 1948 Ottawa RCAF Flyers
- 1968 Ottawa Rough Riders (2019)
- 1969 Ottawa Rough Riders (2019)
- 1974 Ottawa Sooners
- 1975 Ottawa Gee-Gees football team
- 1976 Rockland Nationals
- 1999 Ottawa 67's
- 2012 Ottawa Fury Women's team
- Barrett Family (Fred G. Barrett, Doris Kemp, Fred Barrett Jr., George Barrett, John Barrett, Joan Barrett, Marty Johnston, Kennedy Johnston)
- Eldon Coombe rink
- Isabelle & Paul Duchesnay
- Ottawa Sports and Entertainment Group

Individuals

- Jess Abelson
- T. Franklin Ahearn
- Daniel Alfredsson
- Caroll-Ann Alie
- Gail Amundrud
- Frank Amyot
- Roland Armitage
- Phil Ashcroft (2020)
- Mark Aubry
- Jeff Avery
- Jack Alexander Barber
- Joe Barber (legacy inductee)
- Paul Barber (legacy inductee)
- Jeff Bean
- Clint Benedict
- Chantal Benoit (2019)
- Sam Berger
- Marjorie Blackwood
- Leo Boivin
- Donald P. Booth
- Enée Bordeleau
- Frank Boucher
- Georges Boucher
- Sheryl Boyle
- George Brancato
- Bernie Brennan
- Punch Broadbent
- D. Wes Brown
- Keith Brown
- Rod Bryden
- Ervin Budge
- Horst Bulau
- Mike Bullard
- Desmond T. Burke
- Ernie Butter-worth
- Ernie Calcutt
- Don Campbell
- Gerald Bruce Campbell
- R. D. Campbell
- Linda Carbonetto
- Marc Cardinal
- Tom Casey
- Gerry Cassan
- Rick Cassata
- Barbara Caswell-McLeod
- Michael A. Chambers
- Vera Charlebois (legacy inductee)
- Al Charron
- Carol Anne Chenard
- Georges Chénier
- Frank Clair
- King Clancy
- Bud Clark (legacy inductee)
- Tom Clements
- Betsy Clifford
- Harvey Clifford
- John Clifford
- Edmund Condon
- Alec Connell
- Charlie Connell
- Jim Conroy
- Murray Costello
- Emile Côté
- Bill Cowley
- Renn Crichlow
- Jack Darragh
- Howard Darwin
- Eddie Daugherty
- W. F. A. Davies
- Cy Denneny
- Joseph Paul Ernest Désabrais
- Françoise Desbiens (legacy inductee)
- Claude Deschamps
- Rick Desclouds (2019)
- Michel Dessureault
- Judy Elizabeth Dietiker-Davison
- Charlie Diffin
- Bill Dineen
- Mariann Domonkos
- John Donaldson
- Jack Donohue
- Cecil Duncan
- Jake Dunlap
- Jim Durrell
- James Duthie
- Eddie Emerson
- Bob Ferguson
- Hervé Filion
- Frank Finnigan
- Bruce Firestone
- Jim Foley
- Thomas Clarence Foley
- Anna Fraser
- Alexa Fraser-Stirling
- John D. Fripp
- Doug Frobel
- Barclay Frost
- Tony Gabriel
- Garry Galley
- Don M. Gamble
- Eddie Gerard
- Wayne Giardino
- Heather Giford-Seaman
- Glenroy Gilbert
- Dave Gill
- Billy Gilmour
- Edward P. Gleeson
- Tony Golab
- Ebbie Goodfellow
- Tommy Gorman
- Paul Gratton
- Steve Gray
- Hélène Madeleine Grégoire
- Kristina Groves
- Patsy Guzzo
- John Halvorsen (2019)
- Gord Hamilton
- Robert Bruce Hamilton
- Barney Hartman
- Mary Haydon-Provos
- Anne Heggtveit
- Joan Hendry
- Charlie Henry
- Tiny Hermann
- Tim Higgins
- Condredge Holloway
- Sue Holloway
- Derek Holmes (2020)
- Don Holtby
- Rachel Homan
- Charmaine Hooper
- Lyndon Hooper
- Edward James Houston
- Syd Howe
- Debbie Huband
- Bouse Hutton
- Linda Jackson
- Russ Jackson
- Coco Jarry
- Don Johnson (2020)
- Aurèle Joliat
- Gil-O Julien
- Dan Kelly
- Clayton Kenny
- Gale Allen Kerwin
- Terry Kielty
- Brian Kilrea
- Hec Kilrea
- Ray Kinsella
- Bruce Kirby
- Kristina Kiss
- Alison Korn
- Mark Kosmos
- Jim Kyte
- Rocky Lacelle
- Lally Lalonde
- Joe Lamb (legacy inductee)
- Lloyd Laporte
- Ed Laverty
- Alexander Smirle Lawson
- Cyril Leeder
- Tae Eun Lee
- Ken Lehmann
- Percy LeSueur
- Don Loney
- Neil Lumsden
- Brian Thomas Lynch
- Don Lyon
- Eddie MacCabe
- Kilby MacDonald
- Phil Maloney
- Elizabeth Manley
- Alain Marion
- Pat Marsden
- Wally Masters
- Jacques Martin
- Jimmy McCaffrey
- Dave McCann
- Fred C. McCann
- Donald Stuart McDiarmid
- Brian McFarlane
- Frank McGee
- Jim McKenny
- Anne Merklinger
- Horace Merrill
- Pat Messner
- Philip Arnold Samuel Midgley
- Ian Millar
- Joe Miller
- Hazel Minor
- Emma Miskew
- Gordon Montagno
- Earle Morris
- Frederick George Morris
- Janet Morrissey
- Charles E. Mortureux
- Shirley Moulds
- Cliff Murchison
- Bryan Murray
- James Naismith
- Cliff Neill
- Mike Nemesvary
- Joseph André Rodolphe Nézan
- Todd Nicholson
- Frank Nighbor
- Lynn Nightingale
- Bob O'Billovich
- Ambrose O'Brien
- Gerry Organ
- Ken Parker
- Bill Patterson
- Chuck Paul
- Ann Peel
- Wash Pelletier
- Gordon Perry
- Jill Perry
- Chris Phillips (2019)
- Jacques Pilon
- Joe Poirier
- Jo-Anne Polak
- Dale Potter
- Ross Potter
- Denis Potvin
- Johnny Powers
- Harvey Pulford
- Johnny Quilty
- Silver Quilty
- Moe Racine
- Al Rae
- Bob Rathwell
- Larry Regan
- Pat Reid
- Glenda Reiser
- Luke Richardson
- Hugh Riopelle
- Bob Ripley
- Gordon Roberts
- Larry Robinson
- Mel Rogers
- Gus Sanderson
- Joey Sandulo
- Dave Schreiber
- Gary Schreider
- Barbara Ann Scott
- Richard Patrick Scott
- Randy Sexton
- Liv Sherwood
- Allan Shields (legacy inductee)
- Betty Shields
- Hap Shouldice
- Chris Simboli
- Bob Simpson
- Dave Smart (2020)
- Alf Smith
- Billy Smith
- Bobby Smith
- Brian Smith
- Claire Chapman Smith
- Des Smith
- Gary Edward Smith
- Tommy Smith
- Dave Sprague
- Harold Starr
- Ron Stewart
- Val St. Germain
- Pat Stoqua
- Ken Stroulger
- Bruce Stuart
- Hod Stuart
- Mel Swartman
- Ray Takahashi
- Tina Takahashi
- Cyclone Taylor
- Dave Thelen
- Jean-Yves Thériault
- John Therien (2020)
- Shirley Laura Thomas
- Linda Thom
- Brian Timmis
- Andy Tommy
- Andrew Joseph Richard Tommy
- Art Tommy
- Bill Touhey
- Joe Tubman
- Whit Tucker
- Jack Varaleau
- Charles Kaye Vaughan
- Dawn Ventura
- Heather Wallace
- J. C. Watts
- Penny Werthner-Bales
- Rat Westwick
- Bill Westwick
- Erica Wiebe
- Doug Wilson
- Murray Wilson
- Jason York
- Donald Alexander Young
- Steve Yzerman
- Joe Zelikovitz
- Marina Zenk (2020)
