= OTSS =

OTSS may refer to:

- The Fiat-Abarth 1000 OTSS, a variant of the Fiat 850
- Ottawa Technical Secondary School
