= BCES =

BCES may stand for:

== Education ==
- Bridlewood Community Elementary School - An elementary school located in Kanata, Ottawa, Ontario, Canada.

British Counselling & Educational Services.

== Emergency services ==
- Botetourt County Emergency Services - The fire and rescue department located in Botetourt County, Virginia.
