= Hannant =

Hannant is a surname. Notable people with the surname include:

- Beaumont Hannant (born c. 1970), English musician, producer, and DJ
- Ben Hannant (born 1984), Australian rugby league footballer
- Brian Hannant (born 1940), Australian film director
- Laura Hannant (born 1985), Canadian activist
