= David Loeb (Canadian businessman) =

- Born: August 11, 1924
- Died: November 29, 2016 (aged 92)
- Occupations: grocery executive, CFL owner
- Relatives: Jules Loeb (brother)

David Loeb (August 11, 1924 – November 29, 2016) was a Canadian businessman who was owner of the Ottawa Rough Riders from 1969 to 1977. He was the senior vice-president and directory of a wholesale grocery company, Moses Loeb and Company, which was founded by his father, Moses who was originally from Russia.
