= Derek Holmes (ice hockey) =

Canadian ice hockey player and executive (1939–2025)

- Holmes c. 1967–68
- Born: August 15, 1939; Kemptville, Ontario, Canada
- Died: November 24, 2025 (aged 86)
- Education: Carleton University
- Known for: Hockey Canada technical director, head coach of Team Finland and Team Switzerland, international ice hockey agent
- Awards: IIHF Hall of Fame (1999); Ottawa Sport Hall of Fame (2021)

Derek Leroy Holmes (August 15, 1939 – November 24, 2025) was a Canadian ice hockey player, coach, administrator and agent. He served as captain of the Eastern Canadian national team during the late 1960s, and was the technical director of Hockey Canada from 1974 to 1980. He managed the Canadian national teams at the 1977 and 1978 Ice Hockey World Championships, and helped build the 1980 Winter Olympics team. Holmes spent many years on the international ice hockey stage, which included coaching of the Finland and Switzerland national men's teams, and as an international ice hockey agent who signed players to European teams. He was inducted into the builder category of the IIHF Hall of Fame in 1999, the Ottawa Sport Hall of Fame in 2021, and was twice inducted into the Kemptville District Sports Hall of Fame.

== Early life ==
Derek Leroy Holmes was born in Kemptville, Ontario, on August 15, 1939. He was the third of four children to Thomas Fraser Holmes and Elsie Stewart, and had two brothers and a sister. He played minor ice hockey in Kemptville, and was primarily as a centre, with a right-hand shot.

== Player and coach ==
Holmes played junior ice hockey with the Kemptville Royals at age 15, winning the St. Lawrence Hockey League title and a Citizen Shield in 1957. Recruited by Bob Davidson of the Toronto Maple Leafs to play for the St. Michael's Buzzers, Holmes attended St. Michael's College School and won the Toronto city championship. Leaving Toronto after one season, he was captain of the Ottawa Shamrocks in the Interprovincial Junior Hockey League for one season, then was the league's most valuable player next season for the Ottawa Montagnards. After the Montagnards completed the playoffs, Holmes joined the Pembroke Lumber Kings winning the league championship, and briefly played for Ottawa CTC in the Interprovincial Senior Hockey League.

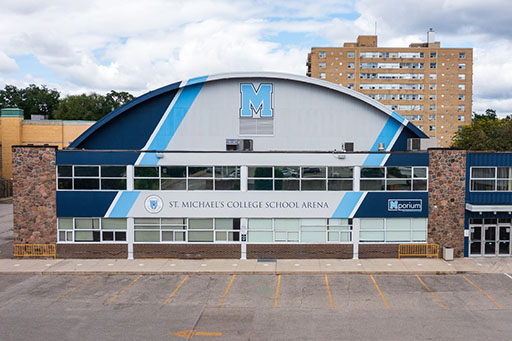
Holmes played for the Buzzers at the St. Michael's College School Arena.

Playing for the Wembley Lions of the British National League during the 1959–60 season, Holmes felt "it was the best thing that ever happened to me". He had signed a contract to play in Italy for the next season, when International Ice Hockey Federation (IIHF) president Bunny Ahearne recruited Holmes to coach the Finland men's national team since its coach Joe Wirkkunen had become ill. Holmes asked his mother to send him The Hockey Handbook by Lloyd Percival, after noticing that Soviet coach Anatoly Tarasov used the book. Holmes travelled Finland scouting players and hosted coaching and goaltender clinics, and coached a club team in Finland. He assembled a national team with an average age less than 23, and only two players who spoke English. Finland finished seventh at the 1961 World Championships with one win versus the West Germany, one tie versus the East Germany, and five losses. After one year of coaching, Holmes resumed his playing career.

Beginning the 1962–63 season on the Windsor Bulldogs in the OHA Senior A League, Holmes finished with the Kemptville-Prescott Combines team in the Ottawa District Hockey Association (ODHA). Holmes was captain of this team which shared home games between Kemptville and Prescott, won the ODHA Senior A championship versus the Ottawa Montagnards, and reached the 1963 Allan Cup Eastern Canada quarterfinals. During the 1960s before and after his time in Europe, he won four St. Lawrence Senior Hockey League championships.

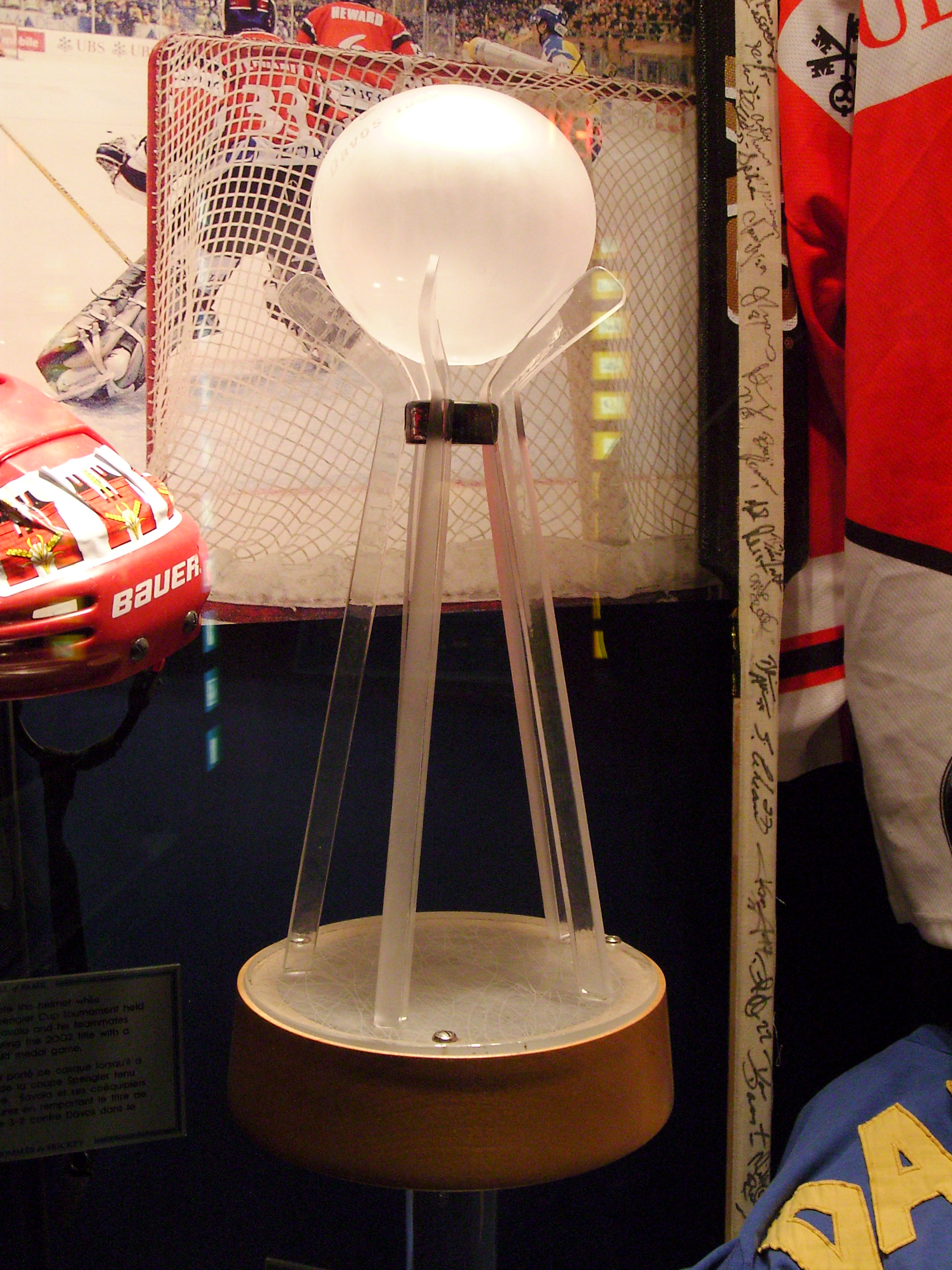
The Spengler Cup trophy

Moving to Switzerland for the 1963–64 season, Holmes was a player-coach for EHC Visp and won the Swiss Cup. Playing for EC Kitzbühel in Austria in the next season, he was the most valuable player at the 1965 Spengler Cup. His subsequent teams included HC La Chaux-de-Fonds in France, then EV Zug and HC Ambrì-Piotta in Switzerland. During these years, he was also a player-coach for the Switzerland men's national team, and the Austria men's national team.

Playing senior hockey in Morrisburg, Ontario, during the 1966–67 season, Holmes joined the Canada men's national team when it was divided into western and eastern branches in 1967. Playing for coach Jack Bownass, Holmes was named captain of the Eastern national team. In the 1967–68 season, the Eastern national team played in the Quebec Senior Hockey League to prepare for the 1968 Winter Olympics, but Holmes missed the Olympics with a hip injury. His tenure with the national team ended following the 1969 World Championships in Stockholm where Canada placed fourth.

Holmes played for the Ottawa Nationals during the 1968–69 season, and briefly for the Rochester Junior Americans and Syracuse Stars in the 1969–70 season. Playing two seasons for the Carleton Ravens from 1969 to 1971, he was captain of the 1971 Ontario-Quebec Athletic Association eastern division champions, was named a league all-star, and graduated from Carleton University with a Bachelor of Arts in history. During the 1971–72 and 1973–74 seasons, he was a player-coach in the Swiss National League, and head coach of Switzerland at the 1972 Winter Olympics and the 1972 World Championships. He led Switzerland to tenth place at the Olympics, and sixth place at the World Championships. In Canada, Holmes coached the Ottawa M and W Rangers team in the Central Canada Hockey League during the 1972–73 season, which included future IIHF medical officer Mark Aubry. The Rangers finished the season with 30 wins and 5 ties, in 55 games played.

== Hockey Canada ==
Holmes was recruited by Doug Fisher and Lou Lefaive while in Switzerland in 1972, to work full-time at for Hockey Canada. Beginning with Hockey Canada in 1974, he felt its purpose was to "beat the Russians". He was the technical director from 1974 to 1980, and summarized his work as being a project coordinator, administrator, and scout Canadian players for the Ice Hockey World Championships and the 1980 Winter Olympics. During this time, he also supported Chinese players seeking experience in Canada.

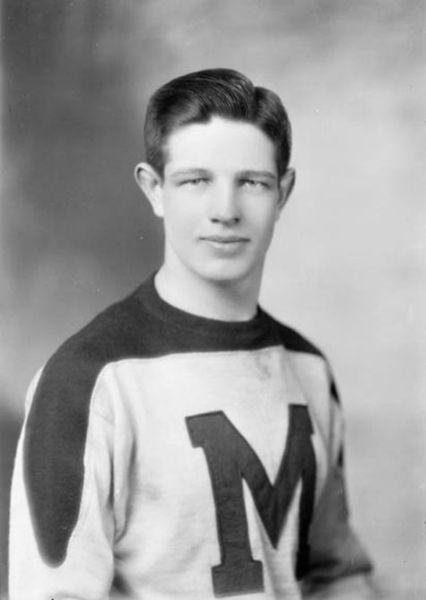
Holmes worked with David Bauer to select players for Team Canada

When Hockey Canada reorganized in 1976, Holmes became the executive secretary-treasurer. He scouted talent the 1976 World Championships and predicted that no country would dominate the upcoming Canada Cup. He later felt that Canada was favoured, on a team assembled by Sam Pollock. Holmes felt that resuming a permanent Canadian Olympic team became more likely, since the 1976 Canada Cup allowed best-on-best competition. The Canadian Interuniversity Athletics Union proposed developing a university team for the 1980 Winter Olympics, but Holmes felt it would exclude deserving junior players. Holmes supported Father David Bauer being put in charge of a committee for selecting a team for the 1980 Winter Olympics.

As chairman of the 1977 World Championships team selection committee, Holmes anticipated using National Hockey League (NHL) and World Hockey Association (WHA) players in Canada's return to the World Championships since its withdrawal in 1970. He and assistant Bill Watters compiled the tournament roster, but Holmes felt that Canadians had low expectations for the 1977 World Championships, and opined "there are a lot of awfully good hockey players who never got a chance to play on a Team Canada".

Holmes searched for a coach that would bring new ideas to the national team, later appointing Johnny Wilson. Holmes was an assistant coach to Wilson, along with Phil Esposito. Holmes stressed that Canada needed to be disciplined due to the lengthy trip, roster size, and the style of international play. After a fourth-place finish at the 1977 World Championships, Holmes felt the team was not disciplined enough, and that roster limitations prevented Canada from replacing players. He recommended going back to a permanent national team similar to the 1960s.

Holmes and Watters resumed the same roles at the 1978 World Championships, extensively scouted opposition teams, and aimed for a more disciplined team. In 1978, he had difficulties getting commitments for the national team, since the NHL and the WHA were signing players to minor league contracts, instead of allowing them to play internationally. At the 1978 World Championships, Canada improved to a third-place finish.

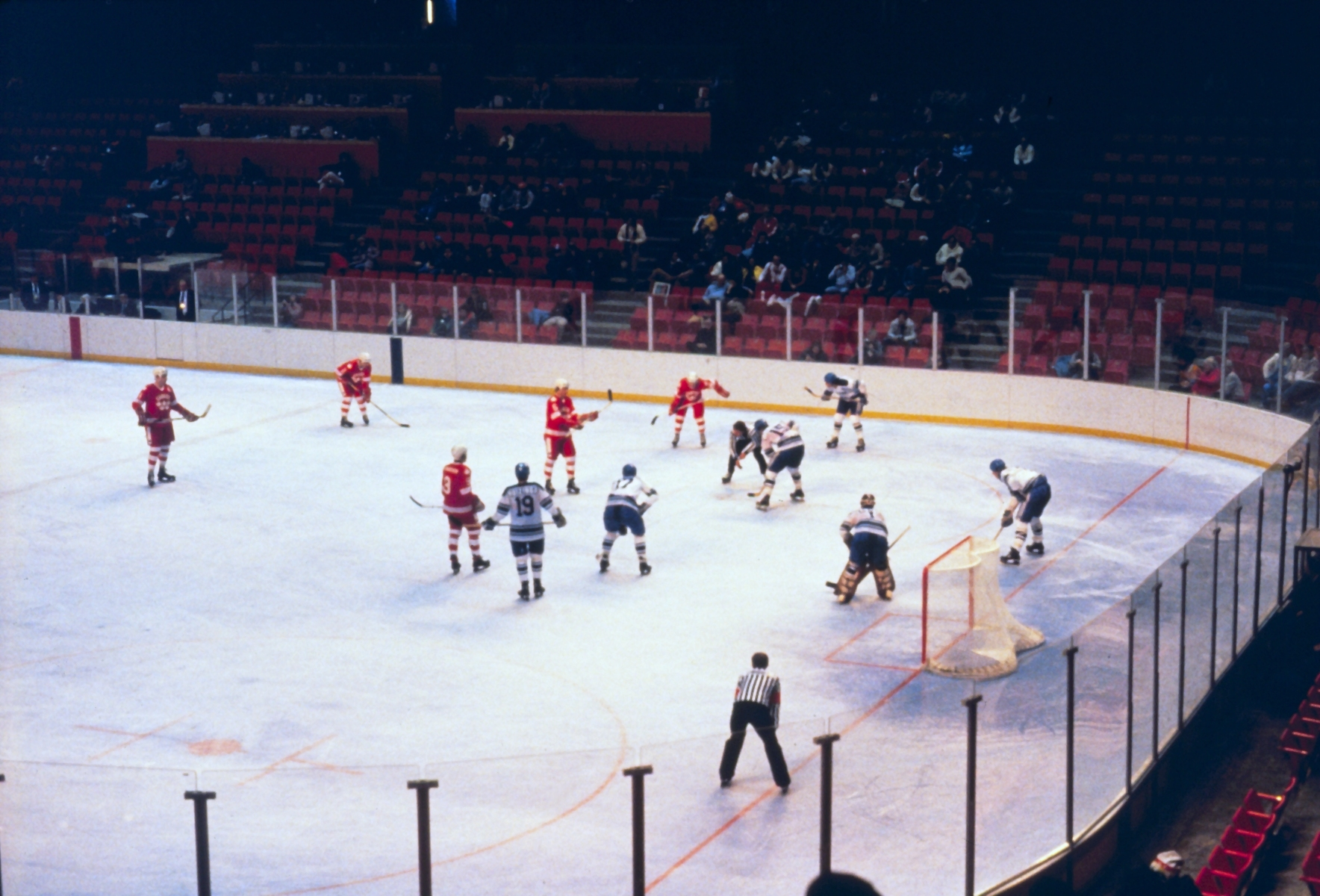
Canada versus the Netherlands at the 1980 Winter Olympic Games

Attending Canadian tryouts for the 1980 Winter Olympics, Holmes worked with Father Bauer and Georges Larivière to build a team during 1978. Holmes's plan for the national program was a separate team for the World Juniors, and a senior team for other tournaments. He assessed players on self-discipline and character, looked for innovative coaching, and selected 65 players for further evaluation. He considered asking NHL and WHA teams to assign their draft picks to Canada, rather than to minor league contracts. The national team played exhibition games versus NHL and WHA teams, and at international tournaments including the Izvestia Cup. Canada finished sixth-place in ice hockey at the 1980 Winter Olympics.

When Lou Lefaive became president of Hockey Canada in 1980, it lessened administrative duties on Holmes, although he resigned on March 31, 1980, without giving a reason. William Houston speculated that Holmes had grown tired of working with Alan Eagleson. Holmes said later in an interview, that Eagleson never felt his actions were wrong, that he could do anything he wanted regardless of the opinions of others, and took credit where it was not due. Holmes was at the Hotel International Prague during the 1972 World Ice Hockey Championships, and said that Eagleson did not take part in the 1972 Summit Series negotiations, and was actually told to mind his own business.

== Player agent ==
Six years after leaving Hockey Canada and working in the private sector, Holmes became a full-time international hockey player agent until 2018, helping players move from Canada to Europe and vice versa. Following the NHL–WHA merger, he facilitated increased player movement to Europe, and expected the trend to continue until teams reached the limit of import players per team. He found a contract for Garry Monahan in Japan, and negotiated a deal for Denis Potvin to play in Europe. Other notable clients included Bruce Cassidy, Fran Huck, Dale McCourt, Rick Middleton, Morris Mott, Danny O'Shea, and Kevin O'Shea. Cassidy described Holmes saying, "he became like an adopted father to me, offering much more than simple hockey advice".

When contacted by the Global Hockey League in 1990 to be a player agent, Holmes declined, stating that the league was poorly planned and he would not represent players.

== Personal life and death ==
Holmes was married to Louise Cornu for more than 55 years, and was a member of the Ottawa Hunt and Golf Club. He died on November 24, 2025, at age 86.

== Honours and awards ==
Holmes was inducted into the IIHF Hall of Fame builder category in 1999. He was inducted into Kemptville District Sports Hall of Fame as an individual in 2012, and again in 2017 as a member of the 1962–63 Kemptville-Prescott Combines team. He was inducted into the Ottawa Sport Hall of Fame during a virtual ceremony in 2021, when the original ceremony was postponed from 2020 during the COVID-19 pandemic in Canada.

== Bibliography ==
- Ferguson, Bob (2005). Who's Who in Canadian Sport, Volume 4. Markham, Ontario: Fitzhenry & Whiteside Ltd. ISBN 1-55041-855-6.
- Houston, William; Shoalts, David (1993). Eagleson: The Fall of a Hockey Czar. Whitby, Ontario: McGraw-Hill Ryerson Ltd. ISBN 0-07-551706-X.
- Oliver, Greg (2017). Father Bauer and the Great Experiment: The Genesis of Canadian Olympic Hockey. Toronto, Ontario: ECW Press. ISBN 978-1-77041-249-1.
