= Sir Guy Carleton Secondary School =

Location
- 55 Centrepointe Dr. Ottawa, Ontario, K2G 5L4; Canada
- 45.346733°N 75.765152°W

Information
- Motto: The School That Works
- School board: Ottawa Carleton District School Board
- Superintendent: Shannon Smith
- Area trustee: Rob Campbell (ZONE 5)
- School number: 942952
- Administrator: Brenda Tanner
- Principal: Dori-Anne Marcelin
- Grades: 9-12 Vocational
- Enrollment: 330 (Sept 2022)
- Language: English
- Campus: Suburban
- Colours: Black and Gold
- Mascot: Knight
- Team name: Sir Guy Knights
- Website: www.sirguycarletonss.ocdsb.ca

Sir Guy Carleton Secondary School is a secondary school in Ottawa, Ontario, Canada. The school specializes in Skilled Trades Education, with three Specialist High Skills Majors (SHSM) programs. It is an application-based school serving students living in the west side of the Ottawa Carleton District School Board. The school also has three OCDSB Specialized Special Education Classes: a General Learning Program, a Physical Support Program and a Behavioural Intervention Program. Offer of placements in the Special Education Classes is done by central board committee.

The school is located in Nepean on Centrepointe Drive. Sir Guy is under the jurisdiction of the Ottawa Carleton District School Board and it is named after Guy Carleton, 1st Baron Dorchester.

Sir Guy is also known for their motto The School That Works; it is well-known not for its athletics but is for its classes.

== Students and staff ==
Sir Guy's students come from the western zones of the Ottawa-Carleton District School Board and from other Ottawa area boards. Students are collected by bus from all over the city to participate in courses suited to their level of ability and entry into the workforce.

The staff is composed of more than 50 teachers, 20 educational assistants, office staff, culinary staff, a technician, and custodial staff.

== Programs offered ==
Programs Offered

- Vocational Program
- Advanced Culinary Education (ACE) Specialist High Skills Major
- Urban Farming Operations (UFO) Specialist High Skills Major
- Advanced Program in Automotive Repair Technology (APART) Specialist High Skills Major
- Cooperative Education
- Non-Composite High School
- Ontario Youth Apprenticeship Program
- Behaviour Intervention Program
- General Learning Program
- Physical Support Program

All meals at Sir Guy are created under the supervision of the Red Seal chefs at the school. In the morning, free breakfasts are provided to all who want one.

The SAGE Youth Program gives students an opportunity to develop and improve their basic literacy skills by working one-on-one with trained and devoted volunteers once a week. The volunteers are from Sage Youth, a volunteer organization based in Ottawa whose purpose is helping high-need children to improve their reading. Sir Guy Carleton hosts these volunteers and pairs with them students who want extra help.

== Notable events ==
- Sir Guy celebrated its 25th year in 2006.
- Retired Principal Debra Ford is among 32 exceptional leaders in education from across the country being recognized as one of Canada's Outstanding Principals for 2007.
- Retired Principal Kevin Bush was recognized for the same award in 2010-2011.
- The school was featured on the TVO Studio 2 program that was produced in June 2005.
- Sir Guy Carleton hosts an annual Thanksgiving dinner for the community which serves more than 1,000 meals. (the thanksgiving dinner has not returned since the pandemic)

== See also ==
- Education in Ontario
- List of secondary schools in Ontario
