= Adult High School (Ottawa) =

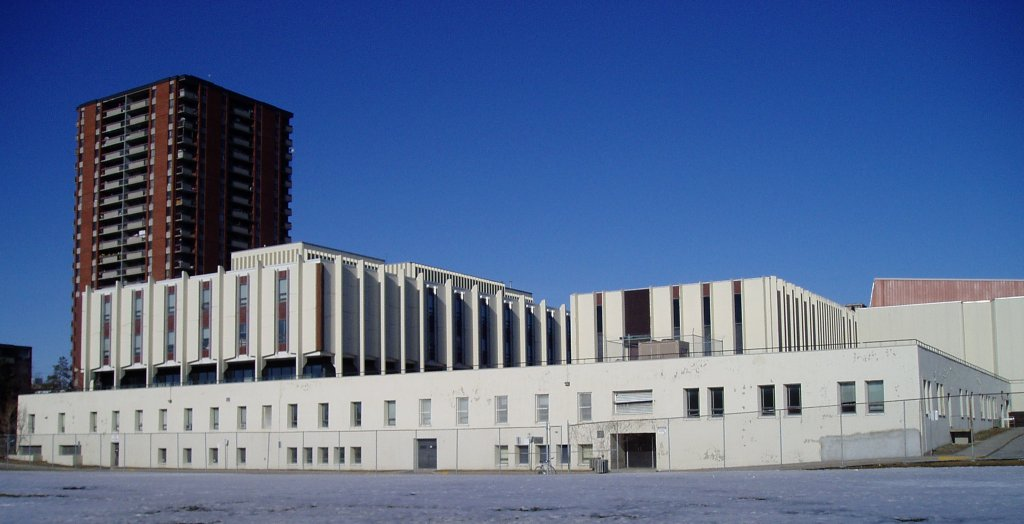

Location
- 300 Rochester Street; Ottawa, Ontario, K1R 7N4; Canada

Information
- Motto: "Education for Life"
- School board: Ottawa Carleton District School Board
- Superintendent: Shannon Smith
- Area trustee: Justine Bell
- Principal: Shannon Adams
- Enrollment: 1,068 (2019)
- Campus: Urban
- Website: adulths.ocdsb.ca

The Adult High School is an Ottawa-Carleton District School Board high school for adults in Ottawa, Ontario, Canada. It is the only regular secondary school entirely for adults in the province of Ontario.

The school is located at 300 Rochester Street southwest of downtown in Little Italy. The complex, built in 1965, originally housed the High School of Commerce which founded an adult education program in 1983. Enrolment at the High School of Commerce gradually decreased until the school closed in 1990 and the Adult High School took over the entire building.

Adult High School is a regular high school, and follows the standard Province of Ontario curriculum. Students are full-time and attend teacher-led classes from September to June. Students at AHS must be over eighteen years of age and have been out of high school for one year. The school offers specialized teaching for older students, and has programs for those with mental or physical disabilities. It also has English as a Second Language programs as many students are immigrants whose high school diplomas are not recognized in Canada. In 2001, 45% of the school's students had a language other than English as a first language. The school also operates a full service day care for students with children.

== Comparison with the rest of Ontario ==
The revision of the Education Act in the late 1990s by premier Mike Harris resulted in the transfer of the burden of the costs of adult education from the taxpayer to the student, resulting in far fewer adults being able to afford acquiring the Grade 12 equivalency needed for entry into college programs.

While this resulted in a decimation in the numbers of adult students all over Ontario seeking high school credit, along with a further decimation of course offerings to such students by schools in their region, Adult High School had survived and flourished to being a full-service public high school. By contrast, most adult high schools in Ontario offer little more than basic math, science and English credit courses, without even any way to diagnose, accommodate, and properly place students with learning disabilities. Ottawa-Carleton's Adult High School offers workplace-level math, English, science, art, and creative writing credit courses that would be well beyond the adult school offerings most other Ontario school boards. The tuition is usually lower than taking a GED exam.

== See also ==
- Education in Ontario
- List of secondary schools in Ontario
