= Mark Aubry =

Canadian physician and sports medicine specialist (born 1954)

- Born: November 24, 1954 (age 71); Noranda, Quebec, Canada
- Education: University of Ottawa
- Occupation: Physician
- Years active: 1981–present
- Employer: Ottawa Senators
- Known for: Sports medicine specialist, and chief medical officer of the IIHF and Hockey Canada
- Awards: Paul Loicq Award; Ottawa Sport Hall of Fame

Mark John Aubry (born November 24, 1954) is a Canadian physician and sports medicine specialist. He is the team physician for the Ottawa Senators, and serves as the chief medical officer of both the International Ice Hockey Federation, and Hockey Canada. He researches and lectures on concussions, plays a leadership role for safety in sport, and is an injury prevention activist in minor ice hockey. He is a recipient of the Paul Loicq Award for his international work, the Dr. Tom Pashby Sports Safety Fund Award for Canada, and the USA Hockey Excellence in Safety Award for the United States. He will be inducted into the Ottawa Sport Hall of Fame in 2024.

== Early life ==
Mark John Aubry was born on November 24, 1954, in Noranda, Quebec, and learned to speak both English and French. He attended Merivale High School, and played hockey, football and baseball at school. Aubry began playing junior ice hockey as a centreman; he is listed at 6 feet tall, and 180 pounds, for the Ottawa M and W Rangers in the Central Canada Hockey League during the 1971–72 season. During the 1972–73 season, he was coached by future IIHF Hall of Fame inductee, Derek Holmes. Aubry won the most valuable player award and the sportsmanship award in the 1972–73 season with the Rangers, and won the sportsmanship award again in the 1973–74 season. He then played for the Ottawa Gee-Gees during the 1974–75 and 1975–76 seasons, while earning his medical degree. After playing, he worked as a trainer for the Gee-Gees.

== Medical career ==
Aubry graduated from the University of Ottawa in 1978. He established a family medicine office in Hull, Quebec on September 18, 1981. As of 2018, he is a director at the Ottawa Sport Medicine Centre, and is a team physician for the Ottawa Senators. Aubry previously served as the team physician for the Ottawa 67's from 1996 to 2005, the Ottawa Rough Riders, the Ottawa Renegades, and the Ottawa Lynx. He was a trainer on minor ice hockey teams from 1989 to 2000, chief medical officer (CMO) for the Canadian team at the 1991 Winter Universiade, and CMO of Canada at the 1992 Winter Olympics in Albertville.

=== Sports medicine ===
Aubry has spent significant time working in sports medicine, lecturing on injury prevention, and researching concussions and spinal cord injuries with respect to body checking in ice hockey. He helped organize three symposiums on sports concussions (2001 in Vienna, 2004 in Prague, and 2008 in Zürich), to assist doctors in identifying and treating concussions. Aubry was one of the physicians consulted for the 2011 report Brain Injury Guide for Youth, and was one of the medical experts that helped write the module Making Head Way in Sport released in 2014, for the Coaching Association of Canada to educate on when it is okay to return to play. Aubry has also spoken against focusing too much on one sport at a young age, as it has not only "taken the fun out of it", but also has physical and cultural risks in not developing the person.

World Hockey Summit

"We're exposing these kids to an increased risk of injury at an age where I think we should still be talking about skill development and having fun".

— Mark Aubry, 2010

At the 2010 World Hockey Summit, Aubry called for raising the minimum age for body checking to 13 or 14 and eliminating hits from behind altogether. Based on his research and experience, he argued that children should be developing skills instead, as they are the most vulnerable to injury due to height and weight differences; he cited research which highlights risks of long-term effects for athletes who have had multiple concussions, specifically younger hockey players. Aubry called for instructing players that a body check is a way of separating an opponent from the puck, rather than continuing the perception of hockey as a rough sport where putting an opposing player through the boards is considered part of the game, given that no safety equipment could prevent serious injuries such as the Ronny Keller incident resulting in paraplegia. Aubry has also testified before the Canadian International Trade Tribunal as an expert witness on the safety of hockey equipment.

Aubry stated that awareness on the long-term effects of concussions increased partially because of the injuries to Sidney Crosby, but noted that physicians in the National Hockey League still disagree on when players are healthy enough to return to play. He was one of the authors in the 2017 report Can visible signs predict concussion diagnosis in the National Hockey League? He assessed Senators' player Clarke MacArthur for post-concussion syndrome, and said that given MacArthur's history, it would be too risky to return to play. He also cited research that in-game concussion protocols need to be strictly adhered to, and reiterated the need to evaluate players at the first sign of possible concussion, rather than staying in the game. He recommends a proactive approach to ensure players do not return to play too soon, citing recent studies on the numbers of concussions in minor ice hockey, and specifically at the peewee age level when players are typically exposed to body checking for the first time. He also spoke at the Canadian Academy of Sport and Exercise Medicine (CASEM) conference in August 2018, to address post-concussion syndrome, and methods for diagnosis.

=== International hockey ===
Aubry began working with the International Ice Hockey Federation (IIHF) in 1994, and has served as the CMO of the International Ice Hockey Federation (IIHF) since 1998. He took over the CMO position from Wolf-Dieter Montag, who had served in the role since 1975. Aubry has focused his international efforts on reducing spinal injuries, concussions, and body checking in the youth age groups.

Aubry also sits on the medical commission of the International Olympic Committee. In this role, he advised against international travel to Beijing for the 2003 Women's Ice Hockey World Championships, which was ultimately cancelled because of the SARS outbreak. In ice hockey at the 2002 Winter Olympics, Aubry stated that the drug which Mattias Ohlund tested positive for was contained in the medicine given to him after eye surgery, and should not be considered a doping infraction. In ice hockey at the 2014 Winter Olympics, Aubry stated that Nicklas Backstrom's positive test for pseudoephedrine was a result of Zyrtec-D taken to treat sinusitis, and it should not be considered a doping infraction. Since Aubry became CMO, IIHF competitions and the Winter Olympic Games, ice hockey officials have been instructed to penalize all hits to the head, and are critiqued for any such missed calls. Aubry was one of the authors of the 2017 report Concussions in international ice hockey championships and olympic winter games between 2006 and 2015. He later spoke at a CASEM conference, discussing how the faults in how the IIHF reports injuries, and the lessons to be learned.

=== Hockey Canada ===
Hockey Canada concussion seminar

"The fight in reducing concussions is global in nature and needs the help of every participant in the sport to prevent this injury through fair play, enforcement of the rules and other measures."

— Mark Aubry, 2010

Aubry has served as the CMO of Hockey Canada since 2004, assisted in developing the Hockey Canada Safety Program, and is a part the safety program committee. He pushed for Hockey Canada to adopt zero tolerance rules for hits to the head, whether accidental or not, and recommended that teams have seminars on the risks of concussions. Since he became CMO, Hockey Canada now requires team trainers to complete a course on handling concussions, recommends that players with concussions get a medical certificate with a doctor's permission to play, and standardized the graduated implementation of checking skills through its age levels across Canada. Aubry has also pushed for educating on ice officials for calling hitting from behind infractions, in addition to checks to the head.

Aubry published H1N1 influenza preventative guidelines prior to the 2009–10 hockey season, and later issued guidelines for the use of water bottles and sports drinks, to prevent the spread of contagious viruses.

== Awards and honours ==
Aubry was given the Dr. Tom Pashby Sports Safety Fund Award in 2006, for his research on concussions and spinal cord injuries. He received the Mayor's Cup in 2011, for outstanding contributions to sport in Ottawa. He was named the recipient of the Paul Loicq Award in 2014, for contributions to international ice hockey. He received the USA Hockey Excellence in Safety Award in 2020. He will be inducted into the Ottawa Sport Hall of Fame in 2024.
