= Fisher Park Public School =

Fisher Park Middle School
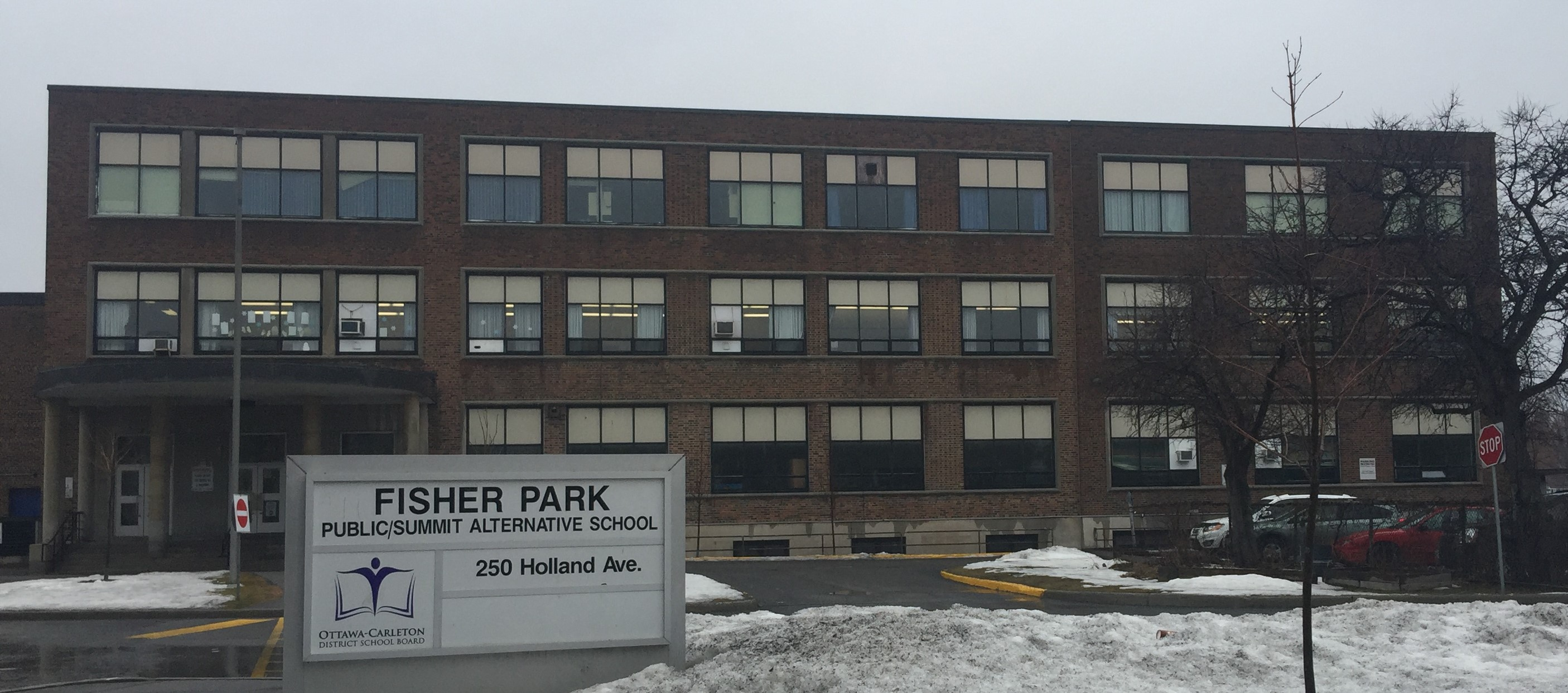

Location
- 250 Holland Ave; Ottawa, Ontario; Canada; 45.395188°N 75.730745°W

Information
- School type: Public, middle school
- Founded: 1949 (high school), 1994 (middle school)
- School board: Ottawa-Carleton District School Board
- Staff: 72
- Grades: 7,8
- Language: English and French immersion education, along with Gifted French Immersion
- Colours: Orange, Blue
- Mascot: Phoenix
- Team name: Fisher Phoenix
- Website: fisherparkps.ocdsb.ca

Fisher Park Middle School is a public middle school in Ottawa, Ontario, Canada, offering English and French immersion education for grades seven and eight. The building is shared with the Summit Alternative School and the Fisher Park Community Centre.

== History ==
In the late 19th century, the Ottawa Electric Railway Company (OERC) bought the farms of Andrew and George Holland and started an amusement park. The road to the park was known as Holland Avenue. The park was first called "West End Park" but later renamed Victoria Park in honour of Queen Victoria's jubilee in 1897. Rides included a "Shoot the Chutes" ride which was a type of log flume ride as well as early showings of motion pictures. The park closed by 1905 because of competition from Britannia Park and Queen's Park in Aylmer.

Fisher Park was one of the sites used for early demonstrations of film (or motion pictures). Thomas Edison launched his Vitascope projected film invention in 1896, and gave the Holland brothers exclusive rights to put it on exhibition in Canada. The Vitascope made its debut on July 21, 1896 at West End Park (Fisher Park).

Fisher Park is the site of a baseball diamond as well as a soccer field. Amateur baseball was played in the park as early as the 1920s when church leagues and city leagues played games in the park. Amateur boys soccer was also played as early as the 1920s.

Fisher Park was originally built in 1949 as the city's fifth public high school, to serve Ottawa's west end, but was closed in 1987 in a controversial decision by the Ottawa school board. The school was reopened in September 1994 as a middle school, feeding students into Nepean High School and Glebe Collegiate Institute.

Between 1987 and 1994, the school was the site of Notre Dame High School which is part of the Ottawa Carleton Catholic School Board. Notre Dame relocated in 1994 to a site on Broadview Avenue.

Before Fisher Park opened, Connaught Public School was the only school in the area which taught middle school classes. In 1993 the former Connaught Public School building on Gladstone avenue was demolished and replaced with a state-of-the-art school. When the new building was constructed the school only offered grades one through six with Fisher Park taking on the role of a middle school for grades seven and eight. During the year of construction, Connaught students attended the site of the former Champlain High School off Island Park Drive at the Kichi Zibi Mikan. William Langdon was appointed Principal of Fisher Park Middle and Summit Alternative Schools in 1994 and lead the Schools until his retirement in 2001. As a former high school building the campus offered middle school students exceptional facilities including cafeteria, 800 seat auditorium and three gymnasiums. The school's sports team is known as the Fisher Phoenix, a name which represents the death and rebirth of Fisher Park. The logo was created by Monsak Lok, a student attending the school the year it re-opened in 1994-95.

Barbara Brockmann, a teacher at the school, was a recipient of the 2002 Governor General's Award for Excellence in Teaching Canadian History.

== See also ==
- Fisher Park High School - the high school that operated at the site until 1987.
