= Henry Botterell =

Canadian fighter pilot

Henry John Lawrence Botterell
- Botterell in 1999 (102 years old), behind him is a Sopwith Camel plane, like the one he flew in World War I
- Born: November 7, 1896; Ottawa
- Died: January 3, 2003 (aged 106); Toronto
- Occupation: fighter pilot
- Known for: served in the Royal Naval Air Service (RNAS) and then in the Royal Air Force (RAF) during World War I

Henry John Lawrence Botterell (November 7, 1896 – January 3, 2003) was a Canadian fighter pilot who served in the Royal Naval Air Service (RNAS) and then in the Royal Air Force (RAF) during World War I. When he died at the age of 106, the Canadian Department of Veterans' Affairs, among others, believed he was the last surviving pilot in the world to have seen action in the Great War.

== Pre-war life and career ==
Henry Botterell was born in Ottawa to Henry and Annie Botterell. His father, a civil servant, died of pneumonia when Botterell was still a young boy. He attended Lisgar Collegiate Institute before beginning a career in banking. Prior to his war service, Botterell worked as a clerk at the Bank of North America (now the Bank of Montreal).

== World War I service ==
=== Entry and training ===
In 1916, he joined the Royal Naval Air Service (RNAS) as a civilian flying trainee. His entry was facilitated by his sister Edith, who worked in the office of Admiral Charles Kingsmill. Botterell was sent to England for training. Around this time, his older brother Edward, who had played football for the Toronto Argonauts, was killed in action in France while serving with the 48th Highlanders of Canada.

On May 16, 1917, Botterell became a Probationary Flight Officer with the RNAS, where he was given the nickname "Nap" because of his supposed resemblance to Napoleon. He received his wings on August 15, 1917, and was awarded Royal Aero Club certificate number 5093.

=== No. 8 Naval Squadron ===
In September, Botterell joined No. 8 Naval Squadron. The squadron, which was usually referred to as Naval 8, was soon posted to France in support of the Royal Flying Corps. Botterell's immediate superior was also a Canadian, the flying ace Flight Commander James White. The squadron was commanded by another ace, Squadron Commander Christopher Draper, who was later known as the "Mad Major" for his habit of flying under bridges.

On September 18, 1917, Botterell's second operational flight as a pilot ended in a crash at Dunkirk when the engine of his Sopwith Pup failed. He sustained head injuries, a fractured leg and broken teeth. After six months in hospital, he was discharged and sent back to Canada.

En route, Botterell ran into some of his former colleagues from Naval 8 in London. They arranged for him to be sent to Manston in Kent to try to re-qualify as a pilot. After 10 hours of refresher training, he was approved to start flying once more and was sent to Serny on the Western Front, where he rejoined No. 8 Naval Squadron, now renamed No. 208 Squadron RAF. He served with them from May 11 to November 27, 1918, flying a variety of missions in different aircraft. He flew patrols and fought over Serny, Tramecourt, Arras, Foucaucourt and Estrées. In 60 days between June and August 1918, he flew 91 sorties.

Botterell's sole air victory was a German observation balloon, which was well-defended by anti-aircraft guns, on August 29, 1918, near Arras. He was returning from dropping four bombs on the railway station at Vitry when he saw the balloon. Putting his Sopwith Camel into a dive, he fired 400 machine-gun rounds at the balloon, setting it aflame. The German observer parachuted to safety.

During his service, Botterell flew a variety of planes, including several Sopwith types (Pup, Camel and Snipe), the RE8, the SE5, the Claude Grahame-White and the Maurice Farman. He logged 251 combat hours.

At the end of the war, Botterell was a flight lieutenant with the Royal Air Force (the Royal Flying Corps and RNAS had been combined on April 1, 1918, to form the RAF).

After his return to Canada, Botterell never flew again except on commercial flights.

== Post-war life and honours ==
Botterell returned to work at the Bank of Montreal as Assistant Chief Accountant, initially in rural Quebec and then in Montreal, eventually retiring in 1970.

In 1929, he married Maud Goater (died 1983). They had two children, Edward and Frances.

During the Second World War, he was an Air Cadet Squadron Commander, in Lachine (now Montreal).

In 1998, Botterell celebrated his 102nd birthday at a hotel in Lille, where he and 16 other Canadian veterans marked the 80th anniversary of the war's end. In 1999, he was guest of honour at a dinner to celebrate the 75th anniversary of the Royal Canadian Air Force. In 2001, he received a visit from members of the present-day 208 Squadron.

The Canadian War Museum in Ottawa now houses a fence post that was caught in the wing of Botterell's Sopwith Camel during a low-level sortie.

During an interview about his wartime exploits Botterell once said: "I had good hands. I didn't have the fighting acumen of some, like Billy Bishop. I was just a bank clerk. I wasn't one of the very best, but I had my share of action."

Botterell died in a Toronto nursing home of causes associated with aging. He was 106.

His portrait is in the National Portrait Gallery, London.

== See also ==
- List of last surviving World War I veterans by country
