= Ottawa-Carleton Educational Space Simulation =

The OCESS Logo

The Ottawa-Carleton Educational Space Simulation (OCESS), unofficially known as "SpaceSim", is a student-run organization within the Ottawa-Carleton District School Board that operates primarily out of Lisgar Collegiate Institute. The chief activity of the club is to educate youth about the sciences with relation to space.

== Mission ==
An important activity conducted by Spacesim is its annual 120-hour simulated space mission. This mission is conducted in a simulated spacecraft or Habitat designed and built by the organization. The current habitat was built in the 2008/2009 school year, after the Ottawa-Carleton District School Board asked OCESS to move to a different room within the same building. The previous habitat had been built in 2001.

Accompanying the Habitat is an array of custom-made software written by the current Teacher Adviser of the organization, Dr. James Magwood. This software handles everything from environmental conditions to the navigation and piloting of the Habitat. Dr. Magwood's work with the organization earned him Carleton University's 2010 Patrick O'Brien High School Teaching Award.

A 2011 mission visited Europa (a moon of Jupiter), an anomalous object, and the Gliese 581 planetary system. The original flight plan was to fly to the potentially habitable Gliese 581g, ⁣⁣ but due to unknown radiation levels and low fuel, the mission landed on Gliese 581f. While the simulation generally steers away from speculative science such as a mission destination the existence of which is indeterminate, this year's was chosen to underscore for members the real life proliferation of exoplanets.

Previous missions include the 2010 mission to three Jupiter moons, the 2009 mission to Iapetus, the 2008 mission to Mars, and the 2007 mission to Borrelly.

== Habitat ==
The Habitat, Hawking III (the third OCESS habitat to be named after eminent physicist Stephen Hawking), is the simulated living space for astronauts during missions. The current incarnation of the Habitat; composed entirely of drywall with metal supports; is made up of seven modules: the Control Room, Interlock, Longhouse, Hotlab, Washroom, Engineering Closet, and Airlock. The Control Room is the flight deck of the Habitat; in it are four computers and some miscellaneous equipment essential to the operation of the mission. The computers run the simulation programs software such as EECOM (Emergency, Environmental & Consumables), BIOCOM (Biological Communications, which details the health of each astronaut both for Mission Control and for the astronauts), ORBIT (the piloting software) and Engineering, which is used to control the habitat's engineering systems. During the Mission each of these programs is run on a dedicated computer, but BIOCOM shares a computer with mission records and logs. Every room is outfitted with CAPCOM (Capsule Communicator), telephone lines that allows the astronauts to communicate with Mission Control.

=== Contents of the rooms ===
- The Control Room contains a television with a camera feed to Mission Control, to enable two-way visual communication in the event of a telephone and radio failure. Astronauts are encouraged to become familiar with sign language, an endeavor in which they are aided by an instructive chart on the wall of the Control Room.
- The Hotlab is a laboratory in which tests are conducted on samples collected during the mission, and contains an isolated work area or 'Hotbox' to handle potentially dangerous substances. It also contains the materials necessary to determine the identity of unknown substances, such as pH Indicators, thermometers and solubility charts. The Washroom contains chemical toilets, and is the only room in the habitat aside from the Engineering Closet that does not contain a video camera.
- The Interlock is the largest room in the habitat, connecting to every other room. It serves as a kitchen, containing a refrigerator, a microwave, and a full complement of cupboards and cutlery, as well as a television and camera feed that monitors activity in the airlock and Hotlab.
- The Longhouse is where the astronauts sleep during the mission. It contains three wooden bunk beds, providing one bed for each of the six astronauts.
- The Engineering Closet houses the vital machines that maintain the vital functions of the habitat, such as the engine, air compression systems, and life support. Finally, the Airlock enables astronauts to enter and exit the habitat without venting the atmosphere inside the other five modules. It contains materials necessary for an Extra-vehicular activity, such as flashlights, sample collectors, and EVA suits. In 2011, Samuel Baltz gave a tour of the habitat and its rooms to the Ottawa Citizen.

== Education ==
Aside from the mission, SpaceSim also conducts several programs to educate youth outside the club. The organization offers two programs: a hands-on learning experience, known as the Elementary Education Program (EEP), and a planetarium program. The OCESS is one of two organizations in the Ottawa area to offer planetariums, the other being the Canada Science and Technology Museum.

=== Elementary Education Program ===
EEPs are offered to every elementary school within the Ottawa-Carleton District school board every year, although only one has been performed in the last four years due to a decline in interest within the organization. These entail transporting one or more classes of students to the OCESS's facilities and providing them with science demonstrations in such fields as Electrostatics, Classical Physics, Rocketry, and special characteristics of the planets of the Solar System.

The best-loved demonstration of the EEP is the Neptune demonstration, which involves freezing marshmallows in liquid nitrogen as a treat for the visiting classes.

Complete details regarding the EEP are available on the OCESS Website.

=== Planetarium Program ===
The Planetarium Program involves transporting the OCESS's inflatable planetarium to elementary or high schools across the Ottawa region and delivering a presentation involving constellations, luminosity, temperature of stars, and a discussion about light pollution. The standard presentation is designed to complement the Grade 9 Ontario Science Curriculum, but the experience is equally suitable for a younger audience.

Complete details regarding the Planetarium Program are available on the OCESS Website.

== Leadership ==
One of the most important facets of the OCESS is the leadership experience it provides for its members. The club is entirely student-run by three commanders: the Mission Commander, the Education Commander, and the Engineering Commander. The Mission Commander is in charge of everything relating to the mission, the Education Commander is in charge of everything relation to Planetariums and EEPs, and the Engineering Commander is in charge of designing any habitat systems, such as door indicators, phone circuitry and/or power systems. The mission is assisted by the Mission Subcommander, who serves as an executive officer, and the Education Commander is assisted by the Planetarium Commander. Ranked below the commanders are the Directors. These consist of the Quartermaster, who is in charge of storage, and the Webmaster, who is in charge of the Spacesim Website. The Webmaster assigns members to the Wiki Task Force, which is headed by the Wikimaster, who is also a Director.

Commanders are chosen every June for the following year, as most of the Commanders are usually in Grade 12, and thus graduate at the end of their term in office.

The 2022–2023 Commanders are:

- Mission Commander: Blakely Haughton
- Mission Subcommander: Owen Matthews
