= Arnold Gosewich =

Canadian literary agent (died 2019)

Arnold Gosewich (1933 or 1934 – October 20, 2019) was a Canadian literary agent and book publishing consultant, whose earlier business career was as a record industry executive.

== History ==
Arnold Gosewich was born in Ottawa, Canada, attended Lisgar Collegiate Institute and the High School of Commerce in that city. He later studied commerce at Clarkson University, graduating with an honors degree in Business Administration, and where one of his classmates was fellow Ottawa native Harvey Glatt.

Gosewich was first involved with the Canadian music industry. In 1957, he partnered with Harvey Glatt, in the establishment of The Treble Clef music store, the first stand-alone music store in that city, which later grew to a chain of stores in Ottawa and area. Gosewich later became the President of Capitol Records of Canada (1969-1976) and subsequently Chairman of CBS Records of Canada, (1977-1982). He became involved in the book publishing industry, becoming the Chief Operating Officer of Macmillan Canada in 1982, prior to becoming a literary agent and book publishing consultant, as of 1989. Gosewich's initial activities as a literary agent were through the acquisition, with fellow Macmillan publisher Linda McKnight, of the Colbert Agency, in 1989. As of 1993, Gosewich established his own literacy agency.

During his career, Gosewich held a number of governance roles in the industry and industry-related associations and organizations. Gosewich was the President of the Canadian Recording Industry Association, now known as Music Canada. He was also a director of the Canadian Songwriters Hall of Fame and of the Ontario Film Development Corporation His awards included the Canadian Recording Industry Association Hall of Fame Award
