= Fisher Park High School =

- Ottawa, Ontario; Canada

Information
- Motto: "Esto Dignus", ("Be Worthy")
- Founded: 1949
- Closed: 1987
- School board: Ottawa Carleton District School Board
- Grades: 9-13
- Enrollment: 490 (founding)- 1,900 (peak)- 500 (closure)
- Language: English, French
- Campus: Urban
- Colours: Red and White
- Communities served: River Ward, with College Ward and Knoxdale-Merivale Ward; Island Park, Bel-Air Park and Bel-Air Heights, Copeland Park and Carlington neighbourhoods
- Feeder schools: J. H. Putman Public School, D. Roy Kennedy Public School, St. Joseph Intermediate School

Fisher Park High School (1949–1987) is a former High School in Ottawa, Ontario, Canada.

Located within a kilometre of Island Park Drive, at 250 Holland Ave., Fisher Park's student population included children of many of Ottawa's wealthier citizens and a large contingent of Ottawa's Portuguese and Italian communities.

== History ==
The story of Fisher Park began in 1945 when Ottawa had only four high schools, and a plan was underway by the Collegiate Institute Board (a cooperation between the Ottawa Separate School Board and the Ottawa Public School Board) to build Ottawa its fifth high school in what was then referred to as the West End. On July 25, 1945, after much debate, Fisher Park was chosen as the site for the new school, and was touted "the most up-to-date building for student and community use that can be built." On December 21, 1946, the Ontario Department of Education announced approval of the school's plans, and building would begin in the spring. The school was estimated to cost $1,450,000.

On November 12, 1948, His Excellency Viscount Alexander, Governor General of Canada, laid the cornerstone of Fisher Park High School.

Fisher Park High School from Holland Ave.

By 1949, however, cost overruns in the building of the school were "deplored" and resulted in a protest by the Board of Trade. "The additional cost of Fisher High School will have a very decided impact on Ottawa's taxpayers" said Roy F. Fleming, the secretary of the Property Owner's Association at the time. Many felt that there was an over-emphasis on recreation (the plan had been to make Fisher Park not only a high school but also a community centre). Plans to make the small gym into a pool, as well as a "girls" gym on the second floor, were scrapped.

Nevertheless, Fisher Park High School opened with the first day of classes on September 6, 1949. Construction continued for the entire first year of the school. Fisher Park was officially opened by the Honourable Leslie Frost (Premier of Ontario 1949–61) on May 2, 1951. The school was named after a former Ottawa mayor and "distinguished Canadian", Harold Fisher.

When Laurentian High School opened in September 1958, 600 students enrolled, which was twice the number that had been expected. The LHS students reduced overcrowding at Nepean High School (Ottawa) and Fisher Park High School. Fisher High's enrolment dropped from 1,900 to 1,439 students.

On November 28, 1966, the Auditorium of Fisher Park High School was the location of the Ottawa debut of Janet Baker.

Throughout the 1970s and 1980s, Fisher Park's home rooms and intramural sports teams were subdivided into six coloured 'houses'. Upon arrival to the school, a student was assigned to a 'house' and remained in that house for their entire stay at Fisher Park. The six houses were Blue, Green, Orange, Red, White and Yellow. Points were awarded for the results of all intramural sports and a winning house was named at the end of each academic year with an appropriately coloured banner raised in the large gymnasium to honour that house.

The school crest was designed by Mr. Robert Walker, then the art director of Fisher Park High School's vocational art course, in the summer of 1952. The crest represented all courses within Fisher Park. The open book on the crest is symbolic of the general course, the open book representing learning. The three smaller panels below represent the three other courses at Fisher, the technical course, the art course, and the commercial course. A T-square, flask, cogwheel and electrical spark represent the technical course, the ship of commerce represents the commercial course, and the art section represented by a palette, brushes, pen and ink. The motto "Esto Dignus", "Be Worthy", was given to Fisher Park by its first vice-principal, Mr. L. McCarthy." - 69-70 Fi-Pa-Hi Yearbook

In 1994 the school reopened as Fisher Park Public School, a middle-school for students in grades 7 and 8. The building is also shared with the Summit Alternative School.

== Notable Sports Championships ==
The following varsity sports teams had major successes:

- 1959 Senior Football Team went undefeated the entire season and won the City Championship against St. Pats 19-7
- 1961 Senior Football Team won the City Championship
- 1963 Varsity Hockey Team went undefeated the entire season and won the City Championship against Glebe
- 1969 Senior Football Team won the City Championship, defeating Glebe 14–0 at Campbell Stadium
- 1969 Senior Boys Soccer Team won the City Championship, defeating Ridgemont
- 1977 Senior Football Team won the City Championship, defeating Laurentian Lions, 6–1; then won the Ottawa Carleton Championship, defeating J.S. Woodsworth 46–0.

== Principals ==
Principals at FPHS included:

- W. B. Wallen (Fall 1949 to Spring 1958)
- J. M. Robbie (Fall 1958 to Spring 1963) (Died June 1977)
- J. G. Enns (Fall 1963 to Spring 1972) (Died September 1974)
- Glen Pettinger (Fall 1972 to Spring 1979) (Died October 2019)
- J. J. Gillespie (Fall 1979 to Spring 1983) (Died January 2011)
- G. McMahon (Fall 1983 to Spring 1985) (Died May 2019)
- S. G. Thompson (Fall 1985 to Spring 1987)

== Notable alumni ==
- Paul Anka — singer, songwriter, and actor. At the school in the 1950s he was part of a trio called the Bobby Soxers
- Tim Higgins — hockey player who played for the Ottawa 67s and professionally in the National Hockey League from 1978 to 1989
- Robin Gammell — actor with several movies and television shows to his credit
- Luke Richardson — NHL hockey player (1987–2008) and coach. Current head coach of the Chicago Blackhawks
- Jeremy Hotz — stand-up comedian, writer for The Jon Stewart Show, actor
- Jeff Waters — heavy metal guitarist, founder of group Annihilator Jeff Waters
- Bruce Cassidy — Class of 1983 hockey player who played for the Ottawa 67s and played professionally and coached in the National Hockey League, current head coach of the Las Vegas Golden Knights
- Chris McKhool — Class of 1987 Juno award nominated musician, composer, children's entertainer
- Jeff Turcotte (Canadian football) — Class of 1971 professional football player who played in the CFL for the Ottawa Rough Riders
- Andrew Moodie Canadian actor and playwright.

== See also ==
- Fisher Park Public School
