= Global Hockey League =

The Global Hockey League was a proposed intercontinental major professional ice hockey league in 1990, spearheaded by the original Winnipeg Jets former owner, Michael Gobuty and World Hockey Association founder Dennis Murphy.

== Planning ==
Formation of the league was announced in Los Angeles on February 10, 1990 with teams in six North American cities, and a vision of expanding to a pair of ten-team divisions in North America and Europe by the following season. The original franchises announced were based in the Canadian cities of Hamilton, Ontario and Saskatoon, Saskatchewan, and US teams based in Albany (NY), Providence (RI), and Los Angeles and Sacramento, California. Original league plans targeted a November 15, 1990 start date.

“International sports are just developing," said league co-founder Dennis Murphy. "Timing is most important. With the way things have been going over in Eastern Europe, there are new markets opening up.”

The Providence entry, dubbed the “New England Clippers”, featured Hall of Famer Brad Park as the General Manager and Coach, and US Olympic gold medal hero Mike Eruzione as the Special Assistant to the team president. The Albany (NY) Admirals franchise was to be owned by Joseph O’Hara and was slated to play in the newly-constructed 15,000-seat Knickerbocker Arena.

The league contacted Derek Holmes as an international ice hockey player agent to represent Canadians in the league, but he declined stating that it was poorly planned.

== Outlook ==
The Global Hockey League looked to capitalize on the anticipated opening to a talented European player base. “With the Eastern Bloc barriers broken down, there are going to be hundreds who can play this level of hockey. There is no doubt we are going to have more than enough talent available to our league,” said league co-founder Dennis Murphy. “There's a lot of talent out there. We are going to develop our own stars."

The league intended to showcase player skills and skating, while limiting the violence that had become so prevalent in the National Hockey League. "We want to clean up hockey and make it a faster and more entertaining game," said GHL Chairman Michael Gobuty. “North American Hockey has become an unappetizing thing to go to. We can't stop fighting altogether, but we can make it a major penalty.”

The GHL would eliminate the red line, move the goals three feet further from the end boards, play two thirty-minute periods (instead of three twenty-minute periods) and decide tie games with penalty shots. The GHL would have a salary cap between $2.1 and $2.5 million per team per season.

== Challenges ==
Like most fledgling sports loops, the Global Hockey League experienced many challenges during the organization stages. By May the Albany franchise had withdrawn from the GHL due to differences between the Admirals owner and league directors, and the GHL was unable to solidify their planned franchise in Southern California. However, they were able to add markets in more US cities, and they moved their timetable for a European Division to the inaugural season.

Following league meetings in Providence in late May 1990, the GHL announced the franchise lineup for the upcoming 1990–91 season. The aforementioned New England Clippers would be joined in a North American Division consisting of teams in New York City, Birmingham (AL), Cleveland, Miami, Sacramento, Hamilton, and Saskatoon. The European Division would consist of teams in Lyon (France), Prague (Czechoslovakia), Milan (Italy), Rotterdam (Netherlands) and Berlin (Germany). The start date was moved up two weeks to November 1.

== Postponement and demise ==
However, divisions among several team owners and league directors as to their vision for the league soon surfaced, and it became apparent that the logistics of starting the new league on such a tight scheduled were unrealistic. “We’ve been trying very hard in the past five months to consummate the Global Hockey League and play in 1990–91,” Gobuty said in a news conference. “It's very difficult --- buildings, players, contracts, leases, getting cities in place in time. Unfortunately, we are not going to begin play in 1990–91.”,

On June 8, 1990, league founders announced they would be postponing the start of the Global Hockey League until the following year. “The business people are very strong, they believe in the Global Hockey League, they believe the idea is right,” Gobuty said at the time. “But we could not come together for 1990–91. We must do this properly and use our business acumen because hockey is a business.”

The additional year of planning did not prove successful. Despite initial high hopes, the Global Hockey League folded without ever playing a season.

== Sources ==
- Birmingham Pro Sports
- Cincinnati Hockey Archives
- "Global Hockey Names Six Sites". The New York Times. February 11, 1990.
