= Lisgar Collegiate Institute =

Location
- 29 Lisgar Street; Ottawa, Ontario, K2P 0B9; Canada; 45°25′14.2″N 75°41′17.0″W

Information
- Funding type: Public
- Motto: Alere Flammam (Nourish the Flame)
- Founded: 1843; 183 years ago
- School board: Ottawa Carleton District School Board
- Superintendent: Prince Duah
- Area trustee: Justine Bell
- Administrator: Mejd Elmahdi
- Principal: Steven Spidell
- Vice Principals: David Scott; Janice Bernstein
- Grades: 9–12
- Enrollment: 943 (2025-2026)
- Campus type: Urban
- Colours: Blue, Silver
- Team name: Lightning (formerly Lords)
- Newspaper: Lisgarwrite
- Yearbook: Vox Lycei
- Communities served: Sandy Hill, New Edinburgh, Centretown, Rockcliffe Park, Ontario
- Public transit access: Line 1 station uOttawa. Also served by routes 5 and 14.
- Website: lisgarci.ocdsb.ca

Lisgar Collegiate Institute is an Ottawa-Carleton District School Board secondary school in Ottawa, Ontario, Canada. The school is located in downtown Ottawa by the Rideau Canal.

== History ==
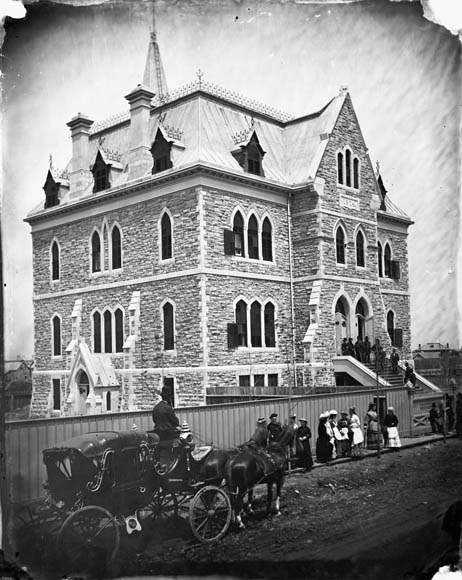
Ottawa Collegiate Institute c. 1875 – 1880

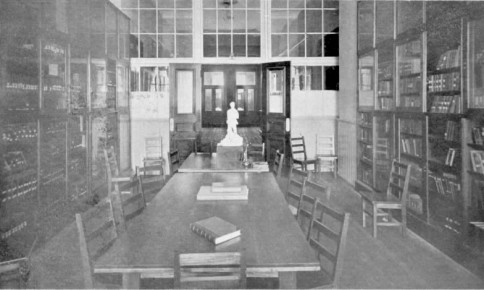
School library collection, 1910

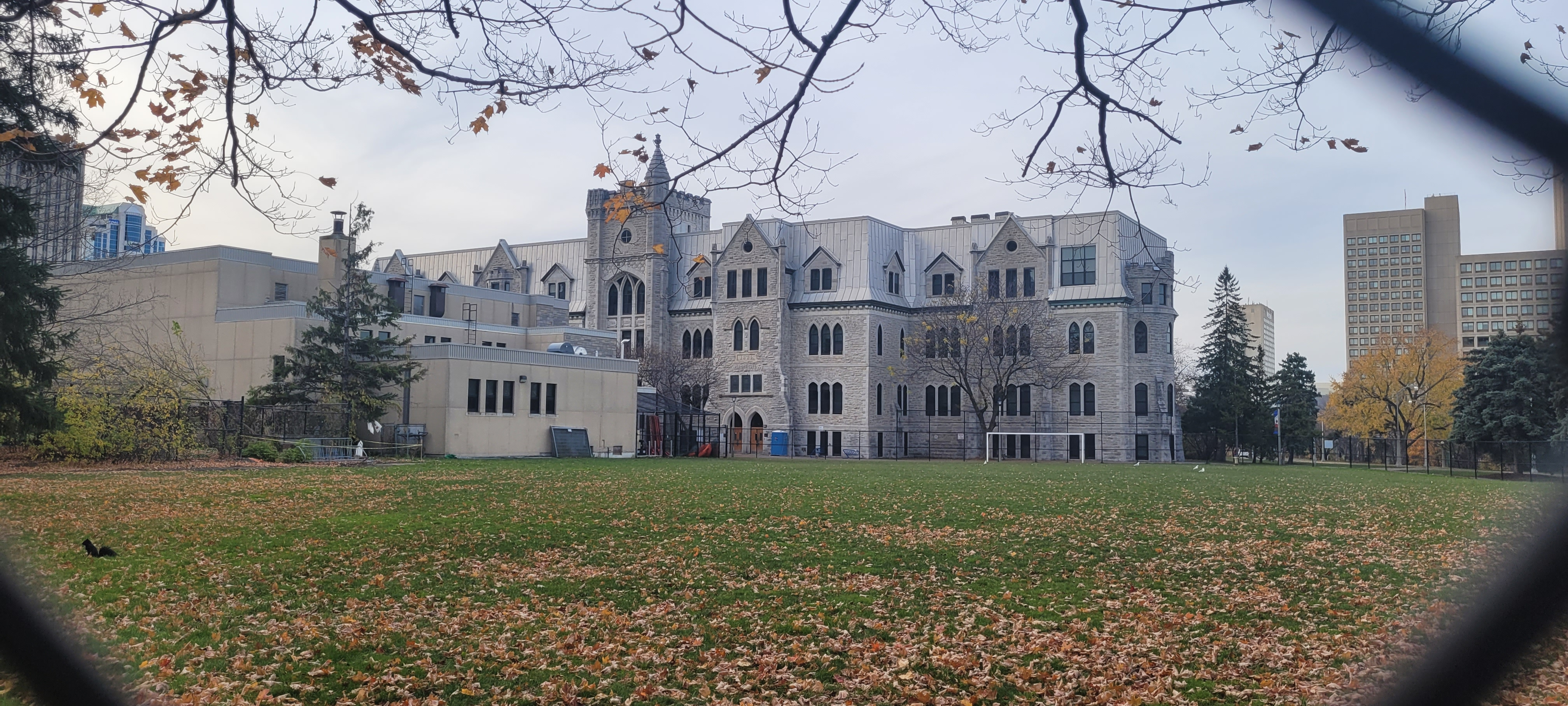
Lisgar Collegiate Institute(High School), Ottawa - November 2024

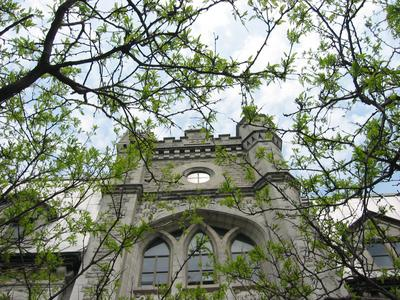
View of Lisgar Collegiate from the Mall, the area between the North and South buildings

In 1843, a grammar school with 40 paying students was opened in the Sandy Hill area of Ottawa in a house at the corner of Waller Street and Daly Avenue. In 1859, the school became one of the first in Ontario to admit girls. The school changed locations several times in the first few years, and was renamed first Bytown Grammar School and later Ottawa Grammar School. In 1871 the school was raised to a high school and in 1873 to a collegiate institute, becoming Ottawa Collegiate Institute.

The school found a permanent home in 1873 when a lot at what was then the southern edge of the city was purchased. The school board acquired the land on Biddy Street for $3,200 and paid a squatter $100 to give up any claims on the land. Biddy Street was renamed Lisgar Street in 1880 after Lord Lisgar, an Irishman who served as Canada's second Governor-General. A Gothic Revival style structure, designed by W.T. Thomas and W. Chesterton, was built at a cost of $26,000. Governor General Lord Dufferin (another Irishman) laid the cornerstone and the school opened in 1874.

In 1892, the school became the first public secondary school in Ontario to hire a female teacher. Four new classrooms were added on the south side in 1892, moving the front wall towards the street and enclosing the front entrance stairs.

A fire in 1893 caused the school to be temporarily closed. Lisgar was one of a limited number of buildings to survive the Great Ottawa fire. There have been a total of 23 fires at the school, including three major ones: 1893, 1915, and 1942.

In 1903, the east wing was built with eight new classrooms. In 1908, Ottawa architect Edgar Lewis Horwood added a west wing with laboratories, an auditorium, and the main tower. The auditorium balcony is suspended by iron rods which lead to huge beams above the ceiling.

A rifle range for the cadet corps, in the now blocked-off fifth-floor attic, was added in 1912. Students practised shooting there until after World War II when shooting moved to the nearby Cartier Square Drill Hall.

A basement cafeteria was added in 1923. After the school was split in 1922 to form Glebe Collegiate Institute, OCI was renamed Ottawa Lisgar Street Collegiate Institute, which was soon shortened to Lisgar Collegiate Institute. Officially, the school remained OCI for several decades. Since the split, Glebe and Lisgar have been traditional rivals.

In 1951, a new gymnasium was built across the street with a tunnel connecting it to the main building. The tunnel had been closed to students for decades before reopening in 2016. The new building was enlarged in 1962. The Gym Building also includes the school's computer science labs, music rooms, and its communication technology classrooms. The area in between the buildings is referred to as "The Mall", and students must cross The Mall to travel between the two buildings.

In 1953, the current, near-vertical roof was installed over the previous sloping roof. This was done to reduce the build-up of winter ice. The old roof is still there and there is an odd-shaped attic space between them.

In 1957, Lisgar was the first school in Ontario to introduce a special program for gifted students.

In the 1970s, the Ottawa Board of Education decided to close the school and sell its downtown real estate. This action was blocked by community members and alumni, and the school was completely renovated instead. This renovation included a small westward extension to the auditorium to add fire exits which replaced external fire exits on the north side of the auditorium. To meet fire code requirements, the existing west staircase was moved from the stair tower westward to just beside the entrance to the auditorium. The result is that now many windows on the north wall do not line up as intended. The windows in the stair tower had been placed a half-way between floors to align with the landings. These windows now lead into classrooms and floor-aligned windows lead into the stairway.

In 1996, the third floor of the North building was completely renovated and the science labs were modernized. In March 2003, parts of the first and second floors and the basement of the North building were damaged by a water main break that closed the school for a week, coincidentally before the previously scheduled March Break, thus giving the students two weeks off school. Some minor changes were made to the affected floors in the reconstruction.

=== Memorial Hall ===
A brass plaque and print were erected by students and alumni in 1986 to Sergeant Edward Holland of The Royal Canadian Dragoons, a graduate of Ottawa Collegiate who was awarded the Victoria Cross for bravery in action during the Boer War at Leliefontein, Komati River, South Africa on November 7, 1900.

The Ottawa Lisgar Collegiate Institute erected a brass plaque which is dedicated to the memory of students of Ottawa Collegiate Institute who died in the Great War. Another memorial is dedicated to the memory of Lieutenant Alexis Hannum Helmer who was killed in action during the war and was part of the inspiration for In Flanders Fields. Unveiled in 2001, the plaque was erected by the Lisgar Alumni Association.

Another memorial plaque is dedicated to the memory of former Lisgar students who died during the Second World War. A memorial framed poster erected by the school is dedicated to the sixteen Canadians awarded the Victoria Cross for conspicuous bravery during the Second World War.

Lisgar Collegiate Institute and Vintage Wings of Canada erected a memorial plaque, unveiled in 2008, dedicated to the memory of Pilot Officer David Francis Gaston Rouleau, who died during the Second World War while trying to get to Malta.

The Lisgar Collegiate Institute erected a memorial which is dedicated to the memory of former Lisgar students who died or served during the Korean War.

The Lisgar Collegiate Institute erected a memorial frame including a Canadian flag which was flown in Afghanistan which was presented to Lisgar by LCol Plourde.

== Academics ==
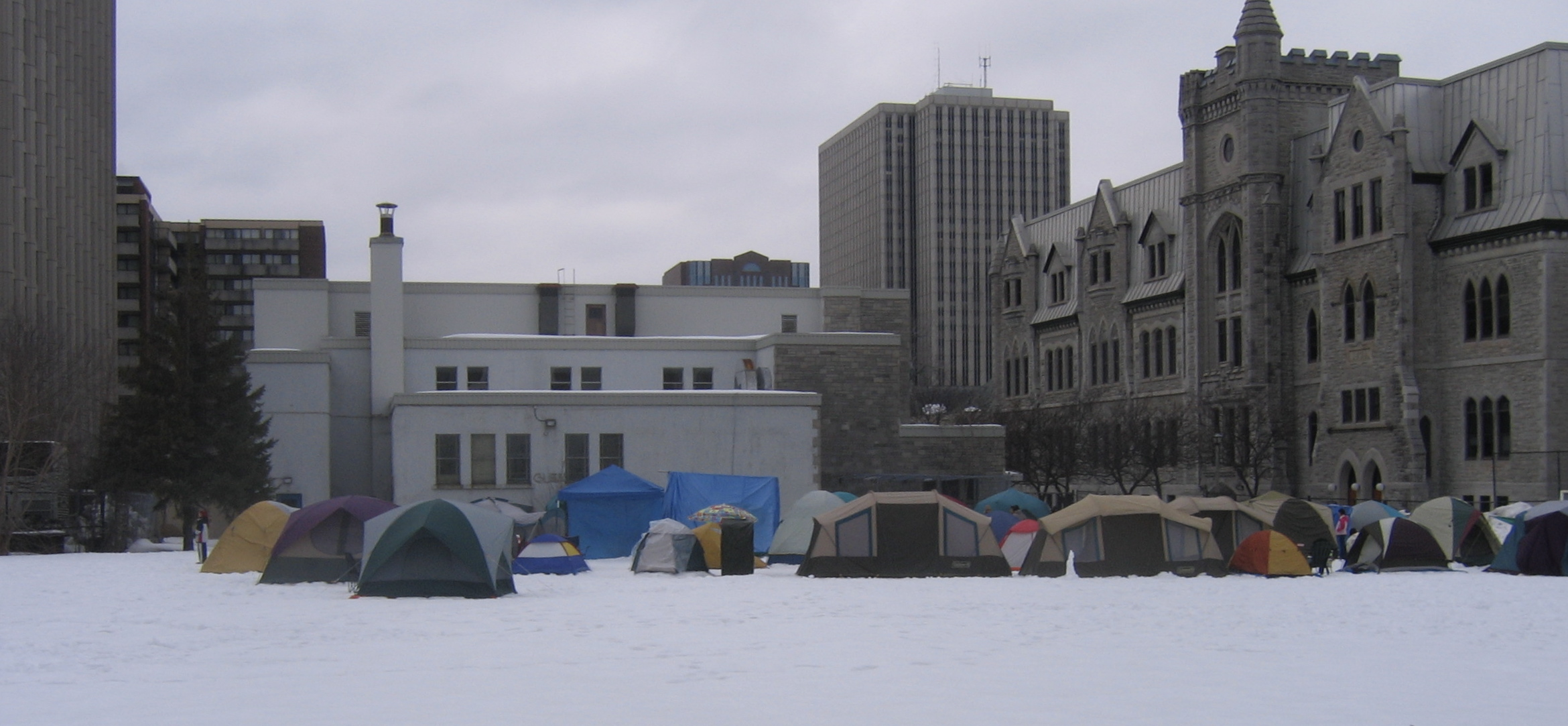
In 2006 parents camped in the Lisgar sports field to enroll a limited number of students from outside Lisgar's catchment in the school.

Lisgar was ranked 12th among all secondary schools in Ontario and 1st in Ottawa by the Fraser Institute in 2021/22. The school serves the neighbourhoods of Sandy Hill, New Edinburgh, Centretown, Rockcliffe Park, and part of Old Ottawa East. In 2006, parents and students camped out overnight to apply for a transfer to Lisgar. Lisgar was ranked number one for public schools in Ottawa and 4th in the province by the Fraser Institute in 2008. Lisgar is also home to the student-run Ottawa-Carleton Educational Space Simulation.

Students have frequently placed in the top ten amongst Canadian Mathematical Olympiad winners.

The school offers Advanced Placement courses. Apart from Advanced Placement Latin: Vergil and Advanced Placement Spanish, students taking AP courses take an advanced form of a regular course, which provides them with an Ontario Credit, as well as taking the AP exam in May. As of 2016, Lisgar inaugurated its AP Capstone Program which requires students to take AP Seminar and AP Research as well as four other AP Courses with a score greater than 3.

== Music ==
The symphony orchestra performing in the Grote Kerk (Breda) in the Netherlands (2018)

Musical ensembles at the school include the concert band (beginner), symphonic winds (senior), concert orchestra (beginner), and Lisgar Symphony Orchestra (senior). Smaller ensembles include the string ensemble, junior and senior jazz bands, and saxophone, flute and clarinet ensembles, and recently the vocal ensemble. These groups take part in music competitions, including the Ottawa Kiwanis Music Festival. All ensembles perform two annual concerts.

== Athletics ==
Sports at Lisgar include rugby, soccer, hockey, basketball, rowing, cross country. At the 160th Reunion, an "Athletic Wall of Fame" was established. There have been three inductions to date, with the third group inducted during the 175th Reunion in May 2018.

== Clubs ==
Clubs available to students include Lisgar Business Co (aka DECA), Debate Club, Biomedical Club, Model United Nations Club, Chess+ Club, Fim Club, Lisgar's Environmental Action Force (LEAF), Ottawa-Carleton Educational Space Simulation (Spacesim), Key Club, Vox Lycei (yearbook), and the school newspaper Lisgarwrite. There are more than 30 clubs in total.

Lisgar's Student Council consists of approximately 30 executive member positions. These include the co-presidents, Student Senator, Secretary, Treasurer, and 5-6 elected grade representatives, alongside 6 committees and several individual roles consisting of the remaining positions. Student Council is responsible for running a variety of school-wide events and activities throughout the course of the school year, including the Annual Pancake Breakfast, the week-long 'Battle of the Grades', and the end-of-year 'Oscars'.

The school's Reach for the Top team won the Canadian national finals in the 2008, 2015 and 2017 seasons. In 2006, the school's Reach for the Top team became the first Canadian team to participate in the National Academic Quiz Tournaments (NAQT) High School National Championships, placing 25th. In 2008, the Lisgar Reach team became the first team to qualify for both the Canadian Reach for the Top finals and the NAQT High School National Championships in Chicago, placing second in Ontario for Reach and first in their qualifying division (Ottawa) for NAQT. Electing to attend the Reach Nationals in Edmonton, Lisgar came from behind to beat two-time champion University of Toronto Schools 420–415 for the national title. In 2010, Lisgar was able to qualify two teams for the NAQT Chicago tournament.

Lisgar's Improv team has won the National Tournament of the Canadian Improv Games in 1999 and 2000, and from 2004 to 2012 qualified for the Canadian National tournament almost every year.

== Notable alumni ==
- Alexis Helmer – World War I soldier, Canadian Field Artillery, part of inspiration for In Flanders Field
- Arthur Bourinot - lawyer, scholar, poet
- Henry Botterell – World War I Canadian Fighter Pilot
- Maurice Brodie – Polio researcher
- Desmond T. Burke – Canada's Sports Hall of Fame marksman, doctor
- Sam Berger – Lawyer, involved with the Ottawa Rough Riders, as its legal advisor, president, and winning 4 Grey Cups as owner
- King Clancy – Played 16 seasons in the NHL for the Senators and Maple Leafs, member of three Stanley Cup teams
- Adrienne Clarkson – Noted broadcaster and 26th Governor General of Canada
- Peter Cureton – Actor and playwright
- Ted Finn – First director of the Canadian Security Intelligence Service
- Eugene Forsey – Canadian former Senator, constitutional expert
- Jessa Gamble – Author and science journalist
- Arnold Gosewich – Record industry executive and literary agent
- Lorry Greenberg – Former Ottawa mayor
- Lorne Greene – Newsreader, actor, and Star of TV's Bonanza
- James Walton Groves – Mycologist
- Bruce Halliday – Physician and former Member of Parliament
- Laura Hannant – Child activist
- Anne Heggtveit – World and Olympic ski champion
- David Hein – Co-author and co-composer of Tony Award-nominated musical Come from Away
- Sergeant Edward Holland – a member of the Royal Canadian Dragoons who won the Victoria Cross for valour during the Battle of Leliefontein on November 7, 1900, in the Second Boer War
- Donald Jackson – World champion figure skater, first to perform a triple lutz jump
- Peter Jennings – ABC News anchor
- Martin John, professional soccer player, full back for Welsh soccer team Cardiff City.
- Bruce Kirby – Designer of the Laser dinghy
- Evelyn Lambart – Animator
- Dominic LeBlanc – Lawyer and politician. Minister of Intergovernmental and Northern Affairs and Internal Trade and former Minister of Fisheries, Oceans and the Canadian Coast Guard.
- Rich Little – Impressionist
- Naomi K. Lewis – Author
- Adam Logan – Former world Scrabble champion
- Pegi Nicol MacLeod – Teacher, war artist and arts activist, member of the Canadian Society of Painters in Water Colour and the Canadian Group of Painters.
- David McGuffin – CBC News Africa Correspondent
- R. Tait McKenzie – Physician, educator, athlete, soldier, Scouter and renowned sculptor; childhood and lifelong friend of James Naismith inventor of basketball
- Susan McMaster – Poet, performance poet
- Timco Mucunski – Macedonian Minister of Foreign Affairs and academic
- Kate O'Brien – pediatric infectious disease physician; Director of the World Health Organization's Department of Immunization, Vaccines and Biologicals
- Chamath Palihapitiya – Founder & CEO of Social Capital, part owner of the Golden State Warriors, and former senior executive at Facebook
- Matthew Perry – Actor, known for the role of Chandler Bing on Friends.
- Paola Pivi – International multimedia artist
- Simon Pulsifer – English Wikipedia contributor
- Shelagh Rogers – Journalist, host of Sounds Like Canada
- Mike Shaver – Software developer
- Sir Percy Sherwood - Chief Commissioner of Dominion Police
- Shane Smith – Journalist, founder of Montreal-based Vice Magazine
- Percy Sparks – Manufacturer and environmentalist widely credited with being the Father of Gatineau Park
- Valdy – Folk and country musician
- Bill Westwick – Sports editor for the Ottawa Journal, and inductee into the Ottawa Sport Hall of Fame and the Canadian Football Hall of Fame
- Gordon F. Henderson – Top Canadian lawyer, President of the Canadian bar association, Chancellor of the University of Ottawa

== Notable teachers ==
=== Recent Notable Teachers ===
- Tania Asslestien - 2001 to 2026
- Sheri Jarvis - 2006 to 2026
- John Ruff - 2000 to 2026
- Lani Sommers - 2015 to present
- Jeremy Cheeseman - 2018 to present
- Tobi Hunt McCoy 2008 to present

== See also ==
- Education in Ontario
- List of Ottawa, Ontario schools
- Ottawa-Carleton Educational Space Simulation
- List of designated heritage properties in Ottawa
- List of high schools in Ontario
