= Desmond T. Burke =

Canadian sport shooter (1904-1973)

Personal information
- Nationality: Canadian
- Born: December 5, 1904
- Died: April 11, 1973 (aged 68)

Sport
- Sport: Shooting

Desmond Thomas Burke (December 5, 1904 – April 11, 1973) was a Canadian marksman who is the youngest ever to win The King's Prize at the Bisley shooting competitions.

Born in Ottawa, Ontario, Canada, 5 December 1904, Burke attended Lisgar Collegiate Institute, then known as Ottawa Collegiate Institute, where he was a member of the school's cadet corps.

The year after graduating from high school, he won The King's Prize at the age of twenty, the youngest person to do so. He was awarded the medal again in 1925, 1927, 1929, 1930 and 1931 as a lieutenant in the Governor General's Foot Guards.

During this time he was attending Queen's University in Kingston taking Arts, Engineering and Medicine. He won the Queen's University Sir Sanford Fleming Scholarship in engineering in 1926, and in 1932 graduated from medical school at Queen's. He studied to become a radiologist and became an assistant professor of radiology at the University of Toronto.

For these accomplishments, he was inducted into Canada's Sports Hall of Fame in 1972. He was also inducted into the Lisgar Collegiate Institute Athletic Wall of Fame in 2009.

Dr. Burke wrote two books on shooting, "A Practical Rifleman’s Guide" and "Canadian Bisley Shooting, an Art and a Science".
