= Laura Hannant =

Laura Kerstin Hannant (born 1985, in Ottawa, Ontario, Canada) is a youth activist and former Chairwoman of the International Children's Jury.

In 2000, she nominated the late Iqbal Masih to receive the first World's Children's Prize for the Rights of the Child. Iqbal was a "debt slave" who was literally tied to a carpet loom every day for six years, and after his escape at the age of 10 campaigned against child slavery. He was killed two years later, whereupon the World's Children's prize honoured him as the posthumous recipient of the Prize at a ceremony in Sweden.

Addressing the United Nations Special Session on Children on May 8, 2002, at the age of 16, Hannant said, "This is going to be the voice of children from now for a long time. You heard our voices now. Are you going to keep listening?"

She has met many famous dignitaries from Mother Teresa to Xanana Gusmão, President of East Timor. She was a child when she met Mother Teresa. She wanted to be like her so she became a children's rights defender. She was not an adult yet, at that time. She was at fourth grade when she began her efforts for the rights of children.

Hannant is a graduate of Lisgar Collegiate Institute in Ottawa and Lester B. Pearson College in Victoria, British Columbia.

As of 2015, Hannant is working as a community organizer in the Kootenays, British Columbia.
