= Ottawa Technical Secondary School =

Ottawa Technical Secondary School (OTSS)
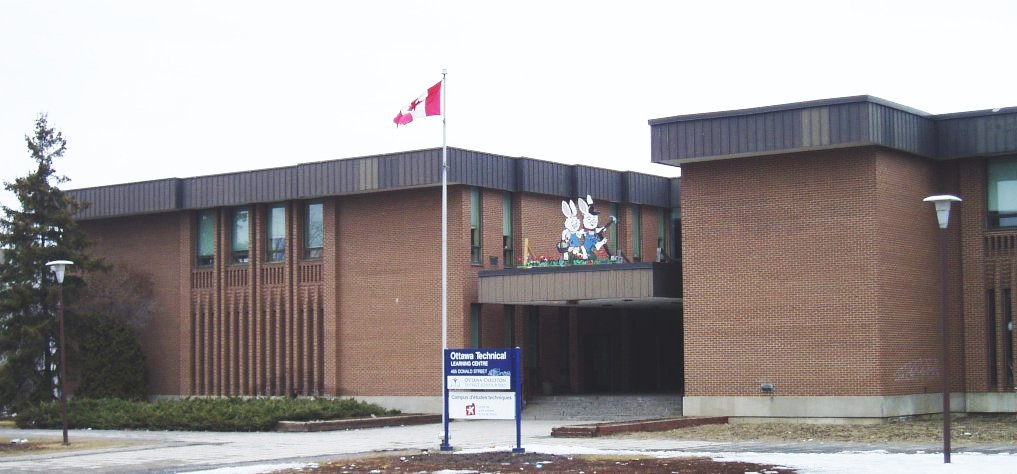

Location
- 485 Donald Street; Ottawa, Ontario, K1K 1L8; Canada; 45.4296°N 75.6464°W

Information
- Founded: 1973
- School board: Ottawa Carleton District School Board
- Administrator: Ashley St-Germain
- Principal: Jason Rama
- Vice Principals: Matt Armstrong; Lynn Pacarynuk
- Grades: 9-12
- Enrollment: 350 (2019-2020)
- Campus: Suburban
- Colour: Orange Blue
- Team name: Mustangs
- Public transit access: OC Transpo (Routes 7,14,18,19 and 620)
- Website: Official website

The Ottawa Technical Secondary School (name changed as of May 1, 2010) is an Ottawa-Carleton District School Board high school in Ottawa, Ontario, Canada.

It specializes in technology, trades, design and engineering education. It is located at 485 Donald Street, Ottawa, Ontario, Canada (Rideau/Rockcliffe ward 13) and as of 2023 serves students from the entire east side of the Rideau River. Until 2001, it was known as McArthur High School. From 2001 to 2010 it was known as Ottawa Technical Learning Centre.

The school opened in 1973 and was one of several vocational schools operated by the Ottawa Board of Education. In 2010, the name was changed to Ottawa Technical Secondary School.

== See also ==
- Education in Ontario
- List of secondary schools in Ontario
