= Jules Loeb =

Jules Loeb (October 3, 1917 – September 15, 2008) was a business owner and politician in Quebec. He served as mayor of South Hull from 1961 to 1963.

The son of Moses Loeb, a Russian immigrant, he was born and raised in Ottawa. He studied at the Ottawa High School of Commerce and at an agricultural college in Palestine, at that time administered by the British. Loeb served in the Royal Canadian Air Force during World War II. He speculated in real estate and built the Embassy Hotel in Ottawa and the Park Lane hotel (later a Ramada hotel). Loeb also operated a small chain of department stores in the area. He served as a principal for the Loeb IGA grocery chain in Canada. Loeb was an important collector of Canadian art. In 1970, the National Gallery of Canada organized a tour across Canada of selected art from the Loeb collection. He was married to Fay Zelikovitz. Loeb died in Toronto at the age of 90.

His former home, Château Monsarrat, is considered to be a heritage building.
