= Charles Edmond Mortureux =

Charles Edmond ‘Mort’ Mortureux (25 September 1876 – 8 February 1947) was born in Bordeaux, France, and emigrated to Canada about 1899. After graduating from the Ontario Agricultural College at Guelph, he joined the Canadian Department of Agriculture where he served for 25 years as chief translator. He was a leading figure in canoeing and skiing in and around Ottawa, Ontario, for 30 years.

== Ottawa New Edinburgh Canoe Club ==
Mortureux was Captain of the Ottawa New Edinburgh Canoe Club from 1916 to 1922, President of the Club House Company (which built the new clubhouse in 1923) from 1922 to 1925, and Commodore of the club from 1925 until 1946. While he led the club in the 1920s, it was a major power in Canadian paddling, winning the Canadian Canoeing Association Birks Cup for the half mile war canoe race three times and the Perney-Tubman Challenge Trophy for the war canoe half mile race in the Northern Division four times. A keen recreational paddler, he developed many canoe tripping routes in the Gatineau region north of Ottawa.

== Ottawa Ski Club ==
Mortureux was also a leading figure in organizing skiing; from 1919 to 1946 he was the President of the Ottawa Ski Club which under his leadership became one of the largest ski clubs in Canada. He oversaw the development of an extensive network of cross country trails and lodges and the beginning of downhill skiing at Camp Fortune north of Ottawa. As the President of the ski club he lobbied for the creation of Gatineau Park. In 1982 he was inducted into the Canadian Ski Hall of Fame.

In 1950 a monument was erected to his memory at Camp Fortune:

To the Memory of
Charles Edmund Mortureux
President Ottawa Ski Club 1919–1947
His Work Endures in the Gatineau Hills
