= Ottawa-Carleton District School Board =

School board in Ontario, Canada

Location
- Ottawa, Ontario Canada
- Coordinates: 45.3322°N 75.7800°W

District information
- Chief executive officer: Stacey Kay
- Chair of the board: Vacant
- Schools: 113 elementary schools 25 secondary schools 5 secondary alternative program sites
- Budget: CA$974.3 million (2018-2019)
- District ID: B66184

Other information
- Website: www.ocdsb.ca

The Ottawa-Carleton District School Board (OCDSB, known as English-language Public District School Board No. 25 prior to 1999) refers to both the institution responsible for the operation of all English public schools in the city of Ottawa, Ontario and its governing body. Like most school boards, the OCDSB is typically administered by a group of elected trustees and one director selected and appointed by the Board itself. Additionally, annually, two student trustees are selected per provincial regulation.

Since 27 June, 2025, the OCDSB has been under provincial supervision. Its board of trustees is suspended and all decisions regularly made by trustees are made by the provincially appointed supervisor, Robert Plamondon. Student trustees are still elected as of March 2026.

When not in supervision, every four years, within the context of the Ottawa municipal elections, an election is held within each of Ottawa's twelve trustee electoral zones to elect each trustee. Following election and annually thereafter, the board of trustees holds its organizational meeting, where the Board membership elects two of its members to the positions of chair and vice-chair of the Board. Chairs and membership of each of the Board's committees are also determined as part of the organizational meeting. In addition to the twelve trustees, two student trustees are elected by their peers, providing opportunities for the student body to become informed and involved in Board governance.

== History ==
The Ottawa-Carleton District School Board was created on 1 January 1998 in accordance with Ontario provincial government legislation including merging of the former adjacent Carleton Board of Education and the Ottawa Board of Education. The headquarters of the amalgamated school district is located at the former headquarters of the Carleton Board of Education at 133 Greenbank Road, Nepean.

Historically, and to this day, the OCDSB is one of the very few school boards in Ontario with an advisory council on the arts providing input and annual reports to the board of trustees.

In 2009–2010 the OCDSB tried to shut down the Alternative program. A group of students and parents from Lady Evelyn Alt teamed up with a trustee and won the Review.

In 2022 a disciplinary panel with the Ontario College of Teachers found former OCDSB teacher Peter Des Brisay guilty of professional misconduct after sexually abusing a former student in the late 1990s.

In June 2025, the provincial government took over the school board, appointing a supervisor in the process. The government cited "mismanagement and poor decision-making", and that the board had "completely depleted its reserves, incurred an accumulated deficit, and plans to use unsustainable proceeds from asset sales to balance its books" as reasons for the takeover. The move came after two trustees had resigned their positions.

=== Lawsuits ===
In 2017 a family was awarded approximately $3,000 after winning a lawsuit against the OCDSB over the board's failure to take a student's complaints about bullying seriously.

In 2018 two former students filed lawsuits against the OCDSB for failing its "legal duty to provide for the safety of its students".

In 2019 an investigation was launched to look into what ultimately resulted in three sex offence charges against OCDSB teacher Majed Turk in July 2020. The alleged incidents occurred between September and November 2019.

As of 2020, there were ongoing lawsuits filed against the OCDSB for the sexual abuse of its students by now deceased teacher and Bell High School basketball coach, Donald Greenham.

== Organization ==
The OCDSB has 147 school sites (117 elementary, 25 secondary including the Adult High School, plus five secondary alternate sites). Schools within the OCDSB provide English with Core French, Alternative, Early French Immersion, Middle French Immersion, Late French Immersion, Special Education, IEP's and gifted program.

== Finances ==
The OCDSB has an operating budget of $784.8 million for the 2010–2011 school year. In 2007, the school busses belonging to the OCDSB and the coterminous catholic school board were taken over by a new corporation: The Ottawa Student Transportation Authority (See external link, below)

== Demographics ==
The Ottawa-Carleton District School Board is the largest school board in Eastern Ontario, serving students within the City of Ottawa, covering an area of 3,760 km^{2} (1,450 sq mi). The OCDSB is the seventh largest district by school population in the province of Ontario. Enrolment as of 31 October 2007 totalled 72,388 students (47,099 elementary and 25,455 secondary).^{[1]}

The District has 2,711 full-time equivalent (FTE) elementary teachers and 1,337 secondary teachers, as of 31 October 2007, with 238 principals and vice-principals. In addition to the full-time teachers, approximately 2,494 teachers are on the district's occasional teachers list. The OCDSB also has 2,059 administrative and support staff of whom 1,817 work in the schools.^{[1]}

The chair of the OCDSB is Lyra Evans.

== Trustees ==
The following is a list of trustees elected to the school board since its creation.

Election	Zone 1	Zone 2	Zone 3	Zone 4	Zone 5	Zone 6	Zone 7	Zone 8	Zone 9	Zone 10	Zone 11	Zone 12
1997	Lynn Scott	Jim Libbey	Norm MacDonald	Alex Getty	Patty Anne Hill	Russ Jackson	Pam Morse	Sheryl MacDonald (Note: MacDonald resigned to run in the 2006 Orléans Ward by-election and was replaced by David Primeau in January 2006.)	Lynn Graham	Albert Chambers	Andrew Lam	Cynthia Bled
2000	Lynn Scott	Jim Libbey	Norm MacDonald	Margaret Lange (Note: Lloyd replaced Lange who was appointed as the Canadian Trade Commissioner in Buffalo in March 2008.)	Myrna Laurenceson	Russ Jackson	Pam Morse	Sheryl MacDonald	Lynn Graham	Joan Spice	Brian Gifford	David Moen
2003	Lynn Scott	Jim Libbey	Norm MacDonald	Margaret Lange	Alex Getty	Bronwyn Funiciello	Greg Laws (Note: Morse replaced Laws who moved to Toronto in December 2008.)	Sheryl MacDonald	Lynn Graham	Joan Spice	Riley Brockington	David Moen
2003	Lynn Scott	Jim Libbey	Norm MacDonald	Margaret Lange	Alex Getty	Bronwyn Funiciello	Greg Laws	David Primeau	Lynn Graham	Joan Spice	Riley Brockington	David Moen
2006	Lynn Scott	Cathy Curry (Note: Boothby replaced Curry who resigned in 2012.)	Alex Getty (Note: Fisher replaced Getty who died in 2009.)	Margaret Lange	Pam FitzGerald	Bronwyn Funiciello	Greg Laws	John Shea	Rob Campbell	Jennifer McKenzie	Riley Brockington	David Moen
2006	Lynn Scott	Cathy Curry	Mark Fisher	Douglas Lloyd	Pam FitzGerald	Bronwyn Funiciello	Pam Morse	John Shea	Rob Campbell	Jennifer McKenzie	Riley Brockington	David Moen
2010	Lynn Scott	Cathy Curry	Donna Blackburn	Theresa Kavanagh	Pam FitzGerald	Bronwyn Funiciello	Mark Fisher	John Shea	Rob Campbell	Jennifer McKenzie	Shirley Seward	Katie Holtzhauer
2010	Lynn Scott	Christine Boothby	Donna Blackburn	Theresa Kavanagh	Pam FitzGerald	Bronwyn Funiciello	Mark Fisher	John Shea	Rob Campbell	Jennifer McKenzie	Shirley Seward	Katie Holtzhauer
2014	Lynn Scott	Christine Boothby	Donna Blackburn	Theresa Kavanagh	Anita Olsen Harper	Chris Ellis	Mark Fisher	Keith Penny	Shawn Menard	Erica Braunovan (Note: Bell replaced Braunovan in February 2020. Braunavon resigned 31 December 2019.)	Shirley Seward	Sandra Schwartz
2018	Lynn Scott	Christine Boothby	Donna Blackburn	Wendy Hough	Rob Campbell	Chris Ellis	Jennifer Jennekens	Keith Penny	Lyra Evans	Erica Braunovan	Mark Fisher	Sandra Schwartz
2018	Lynn Scott	Christine Boothby	Donna Blackburn	Wendy Hough	Rob Campbell	Chris Ellis	Jennifer Jennekens	Keith Penny	Lyra Evans	Justine Bell (Note: Bell resigned June 2025)	Mark Fisher	Sandra Schwartz
2022	Lynn Scott	Alysha Aziz (Note: Aziz announced her resignation due to personal reasons July 2024)	Donna Blackburn	Suzanne Nash	Amanda Presley	Lyra Evans	Jennifer Jennekens	Donna Dickson	Nili Kaplan-Myrth (Note: Kaplan-Myrth resigned June 3, 2025)	Justine Bell	Matthew Lee	Cathryne Milburn
2022	Lynn Scott	Julia Fortey (Note: Fortey was appointed on October 29, 2024, replacing Aziz)	Donna Blackburn	Suzanne Nash	Amanda Presley	Lyra Evans	Jennifer Jennekens	Donna Dickson	Nili Kaplan-Myrth	Justine Bell	Matthew Lee	Cathryne Milburn
2026	John MacRae	Julia Fortey	Brenda Abramson	Emily Quaile	Lara Bremner	Jennifer Moroziuk	Jennifer Jennekens	Rick Bédard	Hilary Clauson	Keelin Pringnitz	Alan Riddell	Cathy Varrette

== List of schools ==
=== Elementary Schools ===
==== JK-3 ====
- Castlefrank Elementary School, Kanata
- General Vanier Public School, Ottawa
- Orleans Wood Elementary School, Gloucester

==== JK-4 ====
- Bayview Public School, Ottawa

==== JK-5 ====
- Carson Grove Elementary School, Gloucester
- Convent Glen Elementary School, Orleans
- Forest Valley Elementary School, Orleans
- Glen Ogilvie Public School, Gloucester
- Le Phare Elementary School, Gloucester
- Manotick Public School, Manotick
- North Gower Public School, North Gower
- Richmond Public School, Richmond
- Robert Hopkins Public School, Gloucester
- Wazoson Public School, Nepean

==== JK-6 ====
- A. Lorne Cassidy Elementary School, Stittsville
- Adrienne Clarkson Elementary School, Nepean
- Avalon Public School, Ottawa
- Bayshore Public School, Nepean
- Bells Corners Public School, Nepean
- Berrigan Elementary School, Nepean
- Brian Mulroney Elementary School, Ottawa
- Briargreen Public School, Nepean
- Bridlewood Community Elementary School, Kanata
- Cambridge Street Community Public School, Ottawa
- Carleton Heights Public School, Ottawa
- Chapman Mills Public School, Nepean
- Charles H. Hulse Public School, Ottawa
- Connaught Public School, Ottawa
- Devonshire Community Public School, Ottawa
- Dunlop Public School, Ottawa
- Elkin Street Public School, Ottawa
- Elmdale Public School, Ottawa
- Farley Mowat Public School, Ottawa
- First Avenue Public School, Ottawa
- Greely Elementary School, Greely
- Half Moon Bay Public School, Nepean
- Hilson Avenue Public School, Ottawa
- Jockvale Elementary School, Nepean
- John Young Elementary School, Kanata
- Kanata Highlands Public School, Kanata
- Knoxdale Public School, Nepean
- Lakeview Public School, Nepean
- Manor Park Public School, Ottawa
- Manordale Public School, Nepean
- Mary Honeywell Elementary School, Nepean
- Meadowlands Public School, Nepean
- Mino Mikan Elementary School, Ottawa
- Mutchmor Public School, Ottawa
- Osgoode Public School, Osgoode
- Pleasant Park Public School, Ottawa
- Queen Mary Street Public School, Ottawa
- Robert Bateman Public School, Ottawa
- Robert E. Wilson Public School, Ottawa
- Roch Carrier Public School, Kanata
- Rockcliffe Park Public School, Ottawa
- Roland Michener Public School, Kanata
- Severn Avenue Public School, Ottawa
- Shingwàkons Public School, Kanata
- Sir Winston Churchill Public School, Nepean
- South March Public School, Kanata
- Stephen Leacock Public School, Kanata
- Steve MacLean Public School, Gloucester
- Stittsville Public School, Stittsville
- Vimy Ridge Public School, Gloucester
- Viscount Alexander Public School, Ottawa
- W. Erskine Johnston Public School, Kanata
- W.E. Gowling Public School, Ottawa
- Westwind Public School, Stittsville

=== Elementary/Intermediate Schools (JK-8) ===
- Agincourt Road Public School, Ottawa
- Alta Vista Public School, Ottawa
- Barrhaven Public School, Nepean
- Blossom Park Public School, Gloucester
- Broadview Public School, Ottawa
- Castor Valley Elementary School, Greely
- Centennial Public School, Ottawa
- D. Roy Kennedy Public School, Ottawa
- Dunning-Foubert Elementary School, Orleans
- Fallingbrook Community Elementary School, Orleans
- Featherston Drive Public School, Ottawa
- Hawthorne Public School, Ottawa
- Henry Larsen Elementary School, Orleans
- Heritage Public School, Navan
- Hopewell Avenue Public School, Ottawa
- Huntley Centennial Public School, Carleton
- Jack Donohue Public School, Kanata
- Kars on the Rideau Public School, Kars
- Maple Ridge Public School, Orleans
- Metcalfe Public School, Metcalfe
- Pinecrest Public School, Ottawa
- Queen Elizabeth Public School, Ottawa
- Roberta Bondar Public School, Ottawa
- Sawmill Creek Elementary School, Gloucester
- Stonecrest Elementary School, Woodlawn
- Summerside Public School, Orleans
- Trillium Elementary School, Orleans
- Vincent Massey Public School, Ottawa
- W.O. Mitchell Elementary School, Kanata
- Woodroffe Ave Public School, Ottawa
- York Street Public School, Ottawa

=== Intermediate schools ===
==== 4-8 ====
- Fielding Drive Public School, Ottawa
- Katimavik Elementary School, Kanata
- Terry Fox Elementary School, Orleans

==== 6-8 ====
- Emily Carr Middle School, Gloucester
- Goulbourn Middle School, Stittsville
- Henry Munro Middle School, Gloucester

==== 7-8 ====
- Cedarview Middle School, Nepean
- Fisher Park/Summit Alternative Public School, Ottawa
- Glashan Public School, Ottawa
- Glen Cairn Public School, Kanata
- Goulbourn Middle School

=== Intermediate/High schools ===
==== 7-10 ====
- Riverside South Secondary School, Ottawa

==== 7-12 ====
- Bell High School, Nepean
- Earl of March Secondary School, Kanata
- Longfields-Davidson Heights Secondary School, Nepean
- Maplewood Secondary School, Stittsville
- Merivale High School, Nepean
- Sir Robert Borden High School, Nepean

=== High schools ===
- A.Y.Jackson Secondary School, Kanata
- Brookfield High School, Ottawa
- Cairine Wilson Secondary School, Orleans
- Canterbury High School, Ottawa
- Colonel By Secondary School, Gloucester
- Glebe Collegiate Institute, Ottawa
- Gloucester High School, Gloucester
- Hillcrest High School, Ottawa
- John McCrae Secondary School, Nepean
- Lisgar Collegiate Institute, Ottawa
- Nepean High School, Ottawa
- Osgoode Township High School, Metcalfe
- Ottawa Technical Secondary School, Ottawa
- Ridgemont High School, Ottawa
- Sir Guy Carleton Secondary School, Nepean
- Sir Wilfrid Laurier Secondary School, Orleans
- South Carleton High School, Richmond
- West Carleton Secondary School, Dunrobin
- Woodroffe High School, Ottawa

=== Alternate/Special Education Programs ===
- Adult High School, Ottawa
- Churchill Alternative, Ottawa
- Clifford Bowey Public School, Ottawa
- Crystal Bay Centre for Special Education, Nepean
- Elizabeth Wyn Wood Secondary Alternate Program, Nepean
- Frederick Banting Secondary Alternate Program, Stittsville
- Lady Evelyn Alternative, Ottawa
- Norman Johnston Secondary Alternate Program, Gloucester
- Regina Street Alternative, Ottawa
- Richard Pfaff Alternate Program, Ottawa
- Riverview Alternative, Ottawa
- Urban Aboriginal Alternate Program, Ottawa

=== Closed ===
- Bronson Avenue Public School (closed 1915; became Borden Public School)
- Kent Street (Central) Public School (closed 1966; the school was the first public elementary school to be built in the city and the first to be closed down)
- Borden Public School (closed and demolished 1966)
- Wellington Street Public School (closed and demolished)
- T.P. Maxwell Public School (now Carlington Community and Health Services)
- Brewer Park Public School (became Westboro Academy 1998–2019; now vacant)
- Parkway Park Public School (now Bishop Hamilton Montessori School)
- Percy Street Public School (closed 1968; a fire by an arsonist destroyed the building in 1979; the school was partially demolished expect for the foundation area which still stands today)
- Quarries Public School (closed 1980; later became East Gate Alliance Church)
- Bel-Air Public School (closed 1980; now École élémentaire publique Charlotte-Lemieux)
- Fairfield Public School (closed 1985; became École élémentaire publique Séraphin-Marion until 2002; demolished 2004)
- Fisher Park High School (closed June 1987; became Notre Dame High School 1987–1994; now Fisher Park Public School and Summit Alternative School)
- Sir John A. MacDonald High School (closed 1987; now St. Paul High School)
- Fisher Heights Public School (closed 1988; now Ottawa Islamic School)
- Graham Park Public School (closed 1988; became École Maimonides School; demolished 2011)
- Borden High School (closed 1990; converted into loft apartments in 2004)
- High School Of Commerce (closed 1990; now Adult High School)
- Brook Lane Public School (closed 1991; now St. Gregory Catholic School)
- Ottawa Technical High School (closed 1992; now Albert Street Education Centre)
- Highland Park High School (closed 1992; now Notre Dame High School)
- Champlain High School (closed 1993; Connaught Public School used the building in 1993-94 while Connaught's building was getting renovated; now Centre Jules-Léger.)
- Confederation High School (closed 1999; now Confederation Education Centre)
- Crichton Street Public School (closed 1999; now The School of Dance)
- McNabb Park Public School (closed 1999; now Richard Pfaff Alternative School)
- Queensway Public School (closed 1999; now Joan of Arc Academy)
- Whitehaven Public School (closed 1999; became École élémentaire catholique Terre-des-Jeunes until 2008; now École élémentaire catholique d'enseignement personnalisé Édouard-Bond)
- City View Public School (became City View Special Education Centre; now Elizabeth Wyn Wood Secondary Alternate Program)
- McArthur High School (closed 2001; now Ottawa Technical Secondary School)
- Overbrook Public School (closed 2001; now Counterpoint Academy Day Care)
- Lamira Dow Billings Elementary School (closed 2002; now École élémentaire publique Séraphin-Marion)
- Meadowview Public School (closed 2004; now Heritage Public School)
- Merivale Public School (closed 2004)
- Riverview Public School (closed 2004; now Baitun Naseer Mosque)
- J. S. Woodsworth Secondary School (closed 2005; now École secondaire publique Deslauriers)
- Laurentian High School (closed 2005; demolished 2009)
- R. Byrns Curry Public School (closed 2006; now Bayview Public School)
- Bayview Public School (relocated to R. Byrns Curry Public School site in 2007; demolished 2009)
- Fitzroy Harbour Public School (closed 2006)
- Grant Alternative School (relocated to Christie Public School site in 2007; closed 2017, now Maison de la francophonie d'Ottawa)
- Christie Public School (closed 2007; became Grant Alternative School 2007–2017)
- Torbolton Public School (closed 2007; now vacant)
- Queenswood Public School (closed 2008; now École élémentaire catholique d'enseignement personnalisé La Source)
- Fitzroy Centennial Public School (closed 2009)
- McGregor Easson Public School (closed 2010; now Pavillon Sainte-Geneviève)
- Parkwood Hills Public School (closed 2010; used by Champman Hills in 2012 and Carleton Heights in 2014)
- Munster Elementary School (closed 2015)
- Rideau High School (closed 2017)
- Elizabeth Park Public School (closed 2017)
- Century Public School (closed 2017; used by Elmdale Public School in 2019, later became a COVID-19 Vaccine clinic)
- D. Aubrey Moodie Intermediate School (closed 2017, later became a COVID-19 Vaccine clinic)
- Leslie Park Public School (closed 2017; now École élémentaire publique Ottawa Ouest)
- Greenbank Middle School (closed 2017; now Knoxdale Public School; the school already shared the building with Knoxdale Public School)
- J.H. Putman Middle School (closed 2019, later became a COVID-19 Vaccine clinic)

== See also ==
- List of schools in Ottawa
- Ottawa Catholic School Board
- Ottawa-Carleton Educational Space Simulation
- List of school districts in Ontario
- List of high schools in Ontario
