= 1995 in Canada =

- Decades: 1970s; 1980s; 1990s; 2000s; 2010s
- See also: History of Canada; Timeline of Canadian history; List of years in Canada

Events from the year 1995 in Canada.

== Incumbents ==
=== Crown ===
- Monarch – Elizabeth II

=== Federal government ===
- Governor General – Ray Hnatyshyn (until February 8) then Roméo LeBlanc
- Prime Minister – Jean Chrétien
- Chief Justice – Antonio Lamer (Quebec)
- Parliament – 35th

=== Provincial governments ===
==== Lieutenant governors ====
- Lieutenant Governor of Alberta – Gordon Towers
- Lieutenant Governor of British Columbia – David Lam (until April 21) then Garde Gardom
- Lieutenant Governor of Manitoba – Yvon Dumont
- Lieutenant Governor of New Brunswick – Margaret McCain
- Lieutenant Governor of Newfoundland – Frederick Russell
- Lieutenant Governor of Nova Scotia – James Kinley
- Lieutenant Governor of Ontario – Hal Jackman
- Lieutenant Governor of Prince Edward Island – Marion Reid (until August 30) then Gilbert Clements
- Lieutenant Governor of Quebec – Martial Asselin
- Lieutenant Governor of Saskatchewan – Jack Wiebe

==== Premiers ====
- Premier of Alberta – Ralph Klein
- Premier of British Columbia – Mike Harcourt
- Premier of Manitoba – Gary Filmon
- Premier of New Brunswick – Frank McKenna
- Premier of Newfoundland – Clyde Wells
- Premier of Nova Scotia – John Savage
- Premier of Ontario – Bob Rae (until June 26) then Mike Harris
- Premier of Prince Edward Island – Catherine Callbeck
- Premier of Quebec – Jacques Parizeau
- Premier of Saskatchewan – Roy Romanow

=== Territorial governments ===
==== Commissioners ====
- Commissioner of Yukon – John Kenneth McKinnon (until June 23) then Judy Gingell
- Commissioner of Northwest Territories – Daniel L. Norris (until January 16) then Helen Maksagak

==== Premiers ====
- Premier of the Northwest Territories – Nellie Cournoyea (until November 22) then Don Morin
- Premier of Yukon – John Ostashek

== Events ==
=== January to March ===
- January 5 – Rogers Communications withdraws the unpopular negative option billing system after wide-scale consumer protest.
- January 7 – The opening of Parliament is televised for the first time.
- January 18 – A video of the Canadian Airborne Regiment's brutal hazing rituals is made public.
- January 23 – As a result of the Somalia Affair and the hazing video, it is announced that the Airborne Regiment will disband.
- January 23 – Guy Paul Morin's conviction for murder that had seen him jailed for 11 years is overturned.
- February 21 – The inquiry into the April 1994 uprising in the Kingston Prison For Women rules that authorities used excessive force in putting it down.
- February 23 – American President Bill Clinton addresses Parliament.
- March 9 – As part of Brian Tobin's Turbot War Canadian officials seize the Spanish trawler the Estai.
- March 15 – Former Nova Scotia Premier Gerald Regan is charged with child abuse.
- March 18 – March 27 – A major rail strike occurs; the workers are eventually legislated back to work.
- March 20 – Erichs Tobias is accused of war crimes.
- March 27 – Bell Canada announces major job cuts.
- March 31 – Perrin Beatty appointed head of the Canadian Broadcasting Corporation (CBC).

=== April to June ===
- April – Chapters is officially incorporated.
- April 9 – Steve Stavro buys Maple Leaf Gardens from Harold Ballard's estate.
- April 16 – The Turbot War ends as Canada and the European Union reach an agreement.
- April 20 – A pipe bomb explodes outside Province House in Prince Edward Island.
- May 18 – The trial of Paul Bernardo begins.
- May 31 – The Royal Canadian Mounted Police (RCMP) announce a $1 million reward in Air India flight 182 case and restarts its investigation.
- June 6 – Labatt is sold to a Belgian company.
- June 8 – Ontario election: Mike Harris's PCs win a majority, defeating Bob Rae's NDP.
- June 9 – Floods in Medicine Hat, Alberta force the evacuation of over 5000 people.
- June 13 – A strict new gun control law is passed banning most handguns and forcing all rifles to be registered.
- June 15 – June 17 – The G7 meet in Halifax, Nova Scotia.
- June 21 – Saskatchewan election: Roy Romanow's NDP win a second consecutive majority.
- June 28 – Mike Harris becomes premier of Ontario, replacing Bob Rae.

=== July to September ===
- July 17 – Christine E. Silverberg becomes Canada's first female police chief when she is promoted to that position in Calgary.
- July 20 – In Hill v. Church of Scientology of Toronto the Supreme Court upholds Canada's largest ever libel award.
- July 27 – Thomson Corp. agrees to sell 27 Canadian newspapers to Hollinger Inc.
- August 1 – Ottawa sportscaster Brian Smith is shot in the parking lot of CJOH by escaped mental patient Jeffrey Arenburg; Smith dies in hospital the following day.
- August 11 – The Russell Hill subway accident, the first fatal accident aboard a Toronto Transit Commission subway, kills three.
- August 18–September 17: Gustafsen Lake standoff
- September 1
  - Paul Bernardo is found guilty of the kidnapping, aggravated sexual assault, and murder of Leslie Mahaffy and Kristen French.
  - The Canadian Airborne Regiment disbands.
- September 6 – The government announces plans to sell off most of its remaining holdings in Petro-Canada.

=== October to December ===
- October 14 – Alexa McDonough is elected head of the New Democratic Party, replacing Audrey McLaughlin.
- October 24 – The James Bay Cree vote 96.3% in favour of their territory remaining part of Canada in the event of Quebec sovereignty.
- October 27 – A massive rally is held in Montreal by the No side in the referendum.
- October 30 – The 1995 Quebec referendum is held on sovereignty. The No side narrowly wins.
- October 31 – Newfoundland passes a constitutional amendment to overhaul its school system.
- November 4 – Radarsat, Canada's first observation satellite is launched.
- November 5 – André Dallaire breaks into 24 Sussex Drive and the Prime Minister fends him off with an Inuit sculpture.
- November 5 – Paul Bernardo is declared a dangerous offender, meaning he will be ineligible for parole.
- November 11 – Journalist Judy Steed, in a conference speech, attacks the chair of Ryerson University's journalism program for employing Gerald Hannon as a part-time instructor; the controversy spans the next three weeks.
- November 15 – British Columbia premier announces his resignation because of the bingogate scandal.
- November 20 – Former PM Brian Mulroney sues the government over the Airbus Affair.
- November 22 – Don Morin becomes premier of the Northwest Territories, replacing Nellie Cournoyea.
- November 23 – Jean Chrétien unveils a law that would give each of Canada's four regions a constitutional veto. The West complains that it deserves more than one.
- November 28 – Canadian National Railway, the nation's largest Crown corporation and one of the largest state-run enterprises in the industrialized world is privatized.
- December – Representatives of aboriginal peoples gather and issue the Sacred Assembly Proclamation; from this was developed the Reconciliation Proclamation and the Statement of Principles and Priorities.
- December 6 – Canada agrees to send 1000 peacekeepers to Bosnia.
- December 11 – Voters in what will become Nunavut select Iqaluit as the capital of the new territory.
- December 20 – Lieutenant-General Jean Boyle becomes Chief of the Defence Staff.
- December 21 – The Krever Commission holds its final hearings.
- December 28 – Premier of Newfoundland Clyde Wells announces his retirement.

=== Full date unknown ===
- Java Moose coffee shops based in Saint John, New Brunswick is established.

== Arts and literature ==
=== New books ===
- bill bissett – Th influenza uv logik
- Ann-Marie MacDonald – The Arab's Mouth
- Douglas Coupland – Microserfs
- Stevie Cameron – On the Take
- Dave Duncan – The Hunters' Haunt
- Antonine Maillet – La Fontaine ou la Comédie des animaux
- Farley Mowat – Aftermath: Travels in a Post-War World
- Timothy Findley – The Piano Man's Daughter

==== Awards ====
- Carol Shields wins the Pulitzer Prize for Fiction for The Stone Diaries
- Robert J. Sawyer wins the Nebula Award for his work The Terminal Experiment
- Giller Prize: Rohinton Mistry – A Fine Balance
- See 1995 Governor General's Awards for a complete list of winners and finalists for those awards.
- Books in Canada First Novel Award: Shyam Selvadurai, Funny Boy
- Geoffrey Bilson Award: Joan Clark, The Dream Carvers
- Gerald Lampert Award: Keith Maillard, Dementia Americana
- Marian Engel Award: Bonnie Burnard
- Pat Lowther Award: Beth Goobie, Scars of Light
- Stephen Leacock Award: Josh Freed, Fear of Frying and Other Fax of Life
- Trillium Book Award English: – Margaret Atwood, Morning in the Burned House and Wayson Choy, The Jade Peony
- Trillium Book Award French: – Maurice Henrie, Le Balcon dans le ciel
- Vicky Metcalf Award: Sarah Ellis

=== Music ===
- Alanis Morissette's Jagged Little Pill released
- Shania Twain's The Woman in Me released
- Ashley MacIsaac, Hi™ How Are You Today?
- Susan Aglukark, This Child
- Art Bergmann, What Fresh Hell is This?

=== Television ===
- April 26 – Direct-to-home satellite television is made legal in Canada.
- Long running quiz show Front Page Challenge is cancelled by the CBC

=== Film ===
- Michael Moore's Canadian Bacon is released.

== Sport ==
- May 21 – Kamloops Blazers win their third (second consecutive) Memorial Cup by defeating Detroit Jr. Red Wings 8 to 2 . The entire tournament was played at the Blazers' own Riverside Coliseum in Kamloops, British Columbia
- May 28 – Jacques Villeneuve becomes first Canadian to win the Indianapolis 500; Canadian Scott Goodyear is third.
- June 24 – Buckingham, Quebec's Claude Lemieux of the New Jersey Devils is awarded the Conn Smythe Trophy
- June 28 – Two more American teams (Birmingham Barracudas and the Memphis Mad Dogs) are established in the Canadian Football League
- July 1 – Quebec Nordiques relocate from Quebec City to Denver, Colorado, to become the Colorado Avalanche
- September 21 – General Motors Place opens in Vancouver
- November 3 – Vancouver Grizzlies win their first game by defeating the Portland Trail Blazers 92 to 80. The game was played at the Rose Garden Arena in Portland, Oregon
- November 3 – Toronto Raptors win their first game by defeating the New Jersey Nets 94 to 79. The game was played at Skydome in Toronto
- November 19 – Baltimore Stallions become the first (and only) American team to win a Grey Cup by defeating the Calgary Stampeders 37 to 20 in the 83rd Grey Cup played at Taylor Field in Regina. Toronto's Dave Sapunjis was awarded the game's and his third Most Valuable Canadian
- November 25 – Calgary Dinos win their fourth Vanier Cup by defeating the Western Ontario Mustangs 54 to 24 in the 31st Grey Cup played at Skydome in Toronto
- December 7 – The Montreal Canadiens trade Patrick Roy to the Colorado Avalanche.

== Births ==
=== January to March ===
- January 3 – Victoria Duffield, singer, actress and dancer
- January 12 – Sarah Mehain, Paralympic swimmer
- January 14 – Eleanor Harvey, fencer
- January 18 – Margaret Purdy, pair skater
- January 24 – Dylan Everett, actor
- January 27 – Madeline Gardiner, artistic gymnast
- February 2
  - Fraser Aird, footballer
  - Curtis Lazar, ice hockey player
  - Darnell Nurse, ice hockey defenceman
- February 8 – Jordan Todosey, actress
- February 23 – Andrew Wiggins, high school basketball player
- March 2
  - Max Domi, ice hockey player
  - Matthew Di Leo, racing driver
  - Morgan Klimchuk, ice hockey player
- March 5 – Zhao Kai Pang, ice dancer
- March 22 – Nicolas Petan, ice hockey player
- March 23 – Jan Lisiecki, pianist
- March 27 – Laurent Dauphin, ice hockey player
- March 28
  - Jonathan Drouin, ice hockey forward
  - Josh Morrissey, ice hockey defenceman

=== April to June ===
- April 5 – Bo Horvat, ice hockey player
- April 11 – Erin Routliffe, New Zealand-born tennis player
- April 13 – Shavon John-Brown, footballer
- April 16 – Remi Elie, ice hockey player
- April 22 – Madison Bowey, ice hockey defenceman
- April 26
  - Frédérik Gauthier, ice hockey player
  - Andréanne Poulin, ice dancer
- April 29 – Tristan Jarry, ice hockey goaltender
- May 9 – Dillon Heatherington, ice hockey defenceman
- May 12 – Talia Chiarelli, artistic gymnast
- May 28 – Zachary Fucale, ice hockey goalie
- May 29 – Jordan Ju, figure skater
- June 6 – Sadi Jalali, Indian-born soccer player
- June 5 – Natasha Purich, figure skater
- June 13 – Mikaela Gerber, artistic gymnast
- June 20 – Carol Zhao, Chinese-born tennis player
- June 29 – Nicholas Latifi, racing driver

=== July to September ===
- July 4 – Jason Dickinson, ice hockey player
- July 6 – Eric Comrie, ice hockey goaltender
- July 11 – Tyler Medeiros, dancer, singer and songwriter
- July 12 – Samuel Morin, ice hockey defenceman
- July 17 – Austin MacDonald, actor
- August 5 – Shea Theodore, ice hockey defenceman
- August 6 – Amy Forsyth, actress
- August 26 – Anthony Duclair, ice hockey player
- August 27 – Cainan Wiebe, actor
- September 1 – Nathan MacKinnon, ice hockey forward
- September 11 – Francesco Yates, musician
- September 6 – Ty Wood, actor
- September 8 – Ellie Black, artistic gymnast
- September 24 – Alexandra Botez, chess player

=== October to December ===
- October 25 – Conchita Campbell, actress
- November 6 – Sam Reinhart, ice hockey centre
- November 12 – Félix Lengyel, Twitch streamer
- November 27 – Ricardo Hoyos, actor
- December 5 – Kaetlyn Osmond, figure skater

=== Full date unknown ===
- Gabriel Maillé, actor
- Sammy Yatim, murder victim (d. 2013)

== Deaths ==
=== January to June ===
- January 19 – Gene MacLellan, Canadian singer-songwriter (born 1938)
- January 28 – George Woodcock, poet, essayist, critic, biographer and historian (born 1912)
- February 23 – Murray Cotterill, trade union activist
- March 14 – John Peters Humphrey, legal scholar, jurist and human rights advocate (born 1905)
- April 23 – Douglas Lloyd Campbell, politician and 13th Premier of Manitoba (born 1895)
- April 25 – Stuart Trueman, journalist and writer
- May 6 – John Black Aird, lawyer, politician and 23rd Lieutenant Governor of Ontario (born 1923)

=== July to September ===
- July 8 – George Johnson, politician and Lieutenant-Governor of Manitoba (born 1920)
- August 2 – Brian Smith, ice hockey player and sportscaster (born 1940)
- August 25 – Francis Lawrence Jobin, politician and Lieutenant Governor of Manitoba (born 1914)
- September 3 – Earle Birney, poet (born 1904)
- September 23 – Philip Gaglardi, politician (born 1913)
- September 30 – Jean-Luc Pépin, academic, politician and Minister (born 1924)

=== October to December ===
- November 3 – Gordon S. Fahrni, medical doctor (born 1887)
- November 11 – Emmett Matthew Hall, jurist, civil libertarian and Supreme Court justice (born 1898)
- November 21 – Bruno Gerussi, actor and television presenter (born 1928)
- November 30 – Philip Givens, politician, judge and Mayor of Toronto (born 1922)
- December 2 – Robertson Davies, novelist, playwright, critic, journalist and professor (born 1913)
- December 3 – Elsie Knott, first female band chief
- December 4 – Lionel Giroux, midget wrestler (born 1935)
- December 16 - Charles Sauriol, naturalist and author (born 1904)

=== Full date unknown ===
- Paul Collins, long-distance runner (born 1926)

== See also ==
- 1995 in Canadian television
- List of Canadian films of 1995
