= McKinstry =

McKinstry is a surname. Notable people with the surname include:

- Alexander McKinstry (1822–1879), American politician
- Arthur R. McKinstry (1894–1991), American Episcopal bishop
- Chris McKinstry (1967–2006), Canadian artificial intelligence researcher
- Elisha W. McKinstry (1824–1901), American jurist
- Henry McKinstry (1805–1871), Canadian mayor
- James A. McKinstry (born 1942), American football player
- James McKinstry (born 1979), Scottish footballer
- Johnny McKinstry (born 1985), Northern Irish football manager
- Kool-Aid McKinstry (born 2002), American football player
- Leo McKinstry (born 1962), Northern Irish writer and journalist
- Nancy McKinstry (born 1959), American businesswoman
- Zach McKinstry (born 1995), American baseball player

== See also ==
- McKinstry's Mills Historic District, a historic district in Maryland, United States
- William McKinstry Farmhouse, a historic house in Massachusetts, United States
- William McKinstry, Jr. House, a historic house in Massachusetts, United States
