= Brian Smith (ice hockey, born 1940) =

Canadian professional ice hockey player and sportscaster (1940–1995)

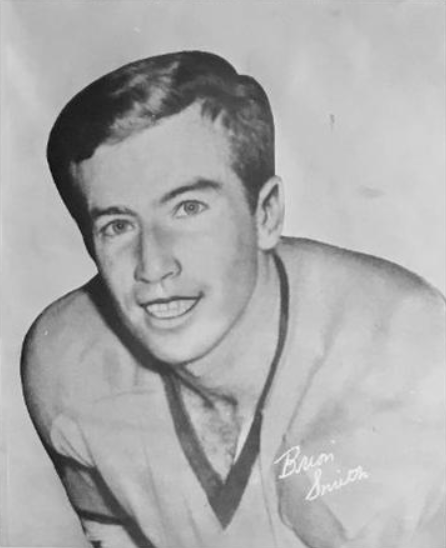
- Smith in 1968
- Born: September 6, 1940 Ottawa, Ontario, Canada
- Died: August 2, 1995 (aged 54) Ottawa, Ontario, Canada
- Height: 5 ft 11 in (180 cm)
- Weight: 170 lb (77 kg; 12 st 2 lb)
- Position: Left wing
- Shot: Left
- Played for: Los Angeles Kings; Minnesota North Stars; Houston Aeros
- Playing career: 1960–1973

Brian Desmond Smith (September 6, 1940 – August 2, 1995) was a Canadian professional ice hockey player and sportscaster. Smith was born in Ottawa, Ontario, the son of former professional ice hockey player Des Smith and brother of former professional ice hockey goaltender Gary Smith. Smith was a professional ice hockey player from 1960 to 1973, playing 67 games in the National Hockey League (NHL) with the Los Angeles Kings and Minnesota North Stars during the 1967–68 and 1968–69 seasons. He also later played for the Houston Aeros of the World Hockey Association during the 1972–73 season. Following his hockey career, Smith was a broadcaster for CJOH-TV in Ottawa until 1995, when he was shot and killed by gunman Jeffrey Arenburg.

== Life and career ==
=== Career ===
Smith played junior hockey for the Brockville Junior Canadiens in 1959–60, making a Memorial Cup appearance in 1960. He began his professional ice hockey career with the Hull-Ottawa Canadiens of the EPHL from 1960 to 1963. He refused to report to the Springfield Indians in 1963 because he was wary of mistreatment by coach Eddie Shore. He played the 1963–64 season in Austria, under the assumed name Bobby Smith before joining the Indians, but only after being suspended by International Ice Hockey Federation President Bunny Ahearne for playing without his release. He played for the Indians from 1964 to 1967 and participated in the team's strike against Shore in 1966. Smith, along with teammate Bill White, got the little-known lawyer Alan Eagleson to represent the players in the conflict, which eventually started Eagleson's career as an agent. The players refused to practice and ultimately Shore was forced to sell the team to Kings owner Jack Kent Cooke for $900,000.

When the NHL expanded in 1967, he was one of the players transferred to the new Los Angeles Kings franchise when they purchased the Indians franchise and its contracts, and he was one of the original Kings' players, playing the 1967–68 season with the Kings. He scored two goals against his brother, Gary Smith.

In the following season, he played for the Phoenix Roadrunners of the Western Hockey League and the Memphis South Stars of the CHL. He then returned to the NHL with the Minnesota North Stars in 1968–69, and finished his career with the WHA Houston Aeros in 1972–73. He broke his jaw in an exhibition game and soon after his career ended.

In 1973, Smith joined Ottawa television station CJOH-TV as the station's 6 PM sports anchor, a position he held until his death. He also participated in charitable activities, especially the Ottawa Boys and Girls Club.

=== Death ===
On August 1, 1995, Smith was shot in CJOH's parking lot, just minutes after the end of the station's 6 PM newscast. He was on his way to a charitable fund-raising event for the Children's Wish Foundation. He died about 18 hours later on August 2 in the Ottawa Civic Hospital. The gunman, Jeffrey Arenburg, who had paranoid schizophrenia, had gone to CJOH because he believed the station was broadcasting messages in his head. Smith was the first broadcast personality that Arenburg recognized coming out of the building.

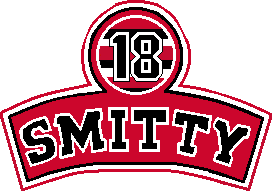
"Smitty" patch worn by the team during the 1995 season

Smith's death was a shock to the Ottawa sports community. The Ottawa Senators honoured him with a 'Smitty 18' patch on their jerseys, which they wore for the 1995–96 season and with a banner hanging in the rafters at Canadian Tire Centre. The press box at Canadian Tire Centre was also renamed the "Brian 'Smitty' Smith Press Box" in his honour. Flags flew at half-staff at an Ottawa Lynx baseball game, and a tribute was held by the Ottawa Rough Riders, whose players raised their helmets while the crowd joined in a one-minute cheer.

Gunman Arenburg was found to be not criminally responsible due to his mental disorder and was sentenced to a mental institution in 1997. He had previously been sentenced to a mental institution but had never reported. An inquest into Smith's killing recommended there should be more public protection and significant changes to the Mental Health Act of Ontario. The result, Brian's Law, was passed on June 21, 2000, by the Ontario Legislature.

Smith's widow, Ottawa Citizen journalist Alana Kainz, established the Brian Smith Memorial Scholarship fund in Smith's memory, which provides tuition funds to attend college or university. It is administered by the Ottawa Boys and Girls Club. In 2001, the club renamed its summer camp from Camp Minwassin to Camp Smitty in Smith's honour. CJOH-TV established the Brian Smith Foundation to give disadvantaged children and young adults in the Ottawa region an opportunity to participate in athletics, recreation and education.

In 2005, he posthumously became a partial namesake of the Ernie Calcutt/Eddie MacCabe/Brian Smith Memorial Lifetime Achievement Award, established by the Ottawa Sport Award Society to recognize careers in journalism.

== Career statistics ==
=== Regular season and playoffs ===
			Regular season					Playoffs
Season	Team	League	GP	G	A	Pts	PIM	GP	G	A	Pts	PIM
1959–60	Brockville Junior Canadiens	UVJHL	—	—	—	—	—	—	—	—	—	—
1959–60	Brockville Junior Canadiens	M-Cup	—	—	—	—	—	13	1	2	3	7
1960–61	Montreal Royals	EPHL	1	0	0	0	0	—	—	—	—	—
1960–61	Hull-Ottawa Canadiens	EPHL	2	0	1	1	0	5	1	0	1	0
1960–61	Hull Canadiens	IPSHL	—	—	—	—	—	—	—	—	—	—
1960–61	Hull Canadiens	Al-Cup	—	—	—	—	—	3	1	0	1	9
1961–62	Hull-Ottawa Canadiens	EPHL	59	16	15	31	35	8	4	3	7	2
1961–62	Hull-Ottawa Canadiens	EPHL	72	24	34	58	40	3	0	0	0	0
1964–65	Springfield Indians	AHL	70	22	12	34	32	—	—	—	—	—
1965–66	Springfield Indians	AHL	69	20	18	38	15	6	0	2	2	4
1966–67	Springfield Indians	AHL	68	30	31	61	15	—	—	—	—	—
1967–68	Los Angeles Kings	NHL	58	10	9	19	33	7	0	0	0	0
1968–69	Minnesota North Stars	NHL	9	0	1	1	0	—	—	—	—	—
1968–69	Phoenix Roadrunners	WHL	21	1	3	4	0	—	—	—	—	—
1968–69	Memphis South Stars	CHL	21	5	7	12	11	—	—	—	—	—
1969–70	Denver Spurs	WHL	60	17	25	42	15	—	—	—	—	—
1970–71	SC Bern	NLA	—	—	—	—	—	—	—	—	—	—
1971–72	SC Bern	NLA	—	—	—	—	—	—	—	—	—	—
1972–73	SC Bern	NLA	—	—	—	—	—	—	—	—	—	—
1972–73	Houston Aeros	WHA	48	7	6	13	19	10	0	2	2	0
WHA totals			48	7	6	13	19	10	0	2	2	0
NHL totals			67	10	10	20	33	7	0	0	0	0
