= Catherine Hickman =

American and Canadian football executive (born 1989)

Cleveland Browns
- Title: Assistant general manager

Personal information
- Born: 1989 (age 36–37); Montreal, Quebec

Career history
- Montreal Alouettes (2015–2017); Coordinator of football administration (2015-2016); Assistant general manager (2017); Toronto Argonauts (2018–2019) Director of football administration; Tampa Bay Vipers (2019) Front office; Philadelphia Eagles (2019–2022); Football operations coordinator (2019-2021); Vice president of football operations (2022); Cleveland Browns (2022–present) Assistant general manager

Catherine Hickman (née Raîche) (born 1989) is the assistant general manager for the Cleveland Browns of the National Football League (NFL). She previously held the position of vice president of football operations for the Philadelphia Eagles of the NFL. She has also held front office positions with the Montreal Alouettes and the Toronto Argonauts of the Canadian Football League (CFL) and Tampa Bay Vipers of the XFL.

== Early life and education ==
In 1989, Raîche was born in Montreal, Quebec. She completed a degree in law at the Université de Sherbrooke and a master's degree in tax.

== Career ==
Raîche began her career in law in 2012 practicing for the Quebec Bar Association. From 2012 to 2015, she worked in business law for a Montreal firm. In 2015, Raîche changed her career and began working in sports for the Montreal Alouettes as an intern. Later in the year, she became the coordinator of Football Administration for the Alouettes in December 2015. Raîche's appointment to the Alouettes made her the first woman to become a personnel executive in the CFL since the hiring of Ottawa Rough Riders general manager Jo-Anne Polak in 1988.

Raîche was a coordinator until January 2017 when she was promoted to assistant general manager alongside Joe Mack for the Alouettes. At the time, she was the only female assistant general manager in the CFL and was the first woman to become a CFL assistant general manager. She remained with the Alouettes before resigning in December 2017. After resigning from her position with the Alouettes, Raîche became the Toronto Argonauts director of football administration in January 2018. She left the Argonauts in April 2019 for a front office position in the XFL, for the Tampa Bay Vipers, reuniting her with head coach/general manager Marc Trestman who was relieved of his duties with Toronto in November 2018.

On July 25, 2019, Raîche was hired as football operations coordinator by the Philadelphia Eagles of the NFL. She was then promoted to the position of vice president of football operations for the Eagles on May 27, 2021. With her promotion, she became the second highest ranked woman in Philadelphia Eagles and NFL history to be involved in football personnel. Susan Tose Spencer became the first and only female general manager in NFL history when she was hired by the Philadelphia Eagles in 1983. Raîche interviewed for the Minnesota Vikings' general manager position in January 2022, becoming the first woman to interview for an NFL general manager position. In June 2022, Raîche was selected by the Cleveland Browns to become the team's vice-president of football operations and assistant general manager.
