= Bill Westwick =

Canadian sports journalist (1908–1990)

- Born: August 2, 1908; Ottawa, Ontario, Canada
- Died: June 19, 1990 (aged 81); Ottawa, Ontario, Canada
- Known for: Ottawa Journal sports editor
- Father: Harry "Rat" Westwick
- Awards: Canadian Football Hall of Fame; Ottawa Sport Hall of Fame

William George Westwick (August 2, 1908 – June 19, 1990) was a Canadian sports journalist. He wrote for the Ottawa Journal from 1926 to 1973, was mentored by Basil O'Meara, then served as the paper's sports editor from 1942 until retirement. Westwick regularly covered ice hockey, Canadian football, and boxing; and had a reputation for not hurting anyone, being accurate, and unquestioned veracity. As the sports editor, he sought for his staff to report the facts first, then develop a personal writing style with time, and mentored his successor Eddie MacCabe. Westwick was the son of Harry "Rat" Westwick, and was inducted into the Ottawa Sport Hall of Fame and the Canadian Football Hall of Fame.

== Early life and family ==
William George Westwick was born on August 2, 1908, in Ottawa, Ontario, to parents Harry "Rat" Westwick and Rubina Duval. Westwick had two brothers and two sisters. His father won the Stanley Cup playing for the Ottawa Silver Seven, and won national championships as a lacrosse player. Thomas Westwick was an uncle to Westwick as his father's brother. Tommy Gorman was also an uncle to Westwick, having married Harry Westwick's sister Mary in 1910. Westwick attended Lisgar Collegiate Institute, where he was an amateur boxer and a collegiate champion. He also played football, hockey and lacrosse.

== Journalism career ==
Westwick began writing for the Ottawa Journal in 1926, mentored by its sports editor Basil O'Meara, who convinced Westwick to write about sports instead of pursuing a professional hockey playing career. Westwick served a brief time as city editor of the Ottawa Journal, then succeeded O'Meara as the sports editor from 1942 to 1973. As the sports editor, Westwick sought for his staff to report the facts first, then develop a personal writing style with time.

Columns by Westwick regularly covered ice hockey, Canadian football, and boxing. He frequently wrote about heavyweight boxing championships, and also reported on the World Series, the Stanley Cup, the Olympic Games, and the British Empire Games. Notable sports events covered were the heavyweight championship won by Cassius Clay, the Richard Riot, the 1960 World Series, and the perfect game pitched by Don Larsen.

During the mid-1950s when the Ottawa Rough Riders were struggling, Westwick poked fun at the team rather than criticize. When coach Chan Caldwell suggested that the team could practice on a train ride to an away game by attaching a railway flatcar filled with dirt, Westwick played along with the joke although the plan never happened. Fellow journalist Eddie MacCabe recalled that Westwick reported on the idea with "brilliant clarity and memorable hilarity".

Following a 1959 National Hockey League playoffs game, Westwick quoted league president Clarence Campbell as accusing the referee Red Storey of "freezing" in the final minutes of a near-riotous game. Storey subsequently resigned as a referee. Campbell stated that Westwick took the words out of context, accused him of "breaking confidence" in the article. Westwick's fellow newsmen defended his article and did not question its veracity.

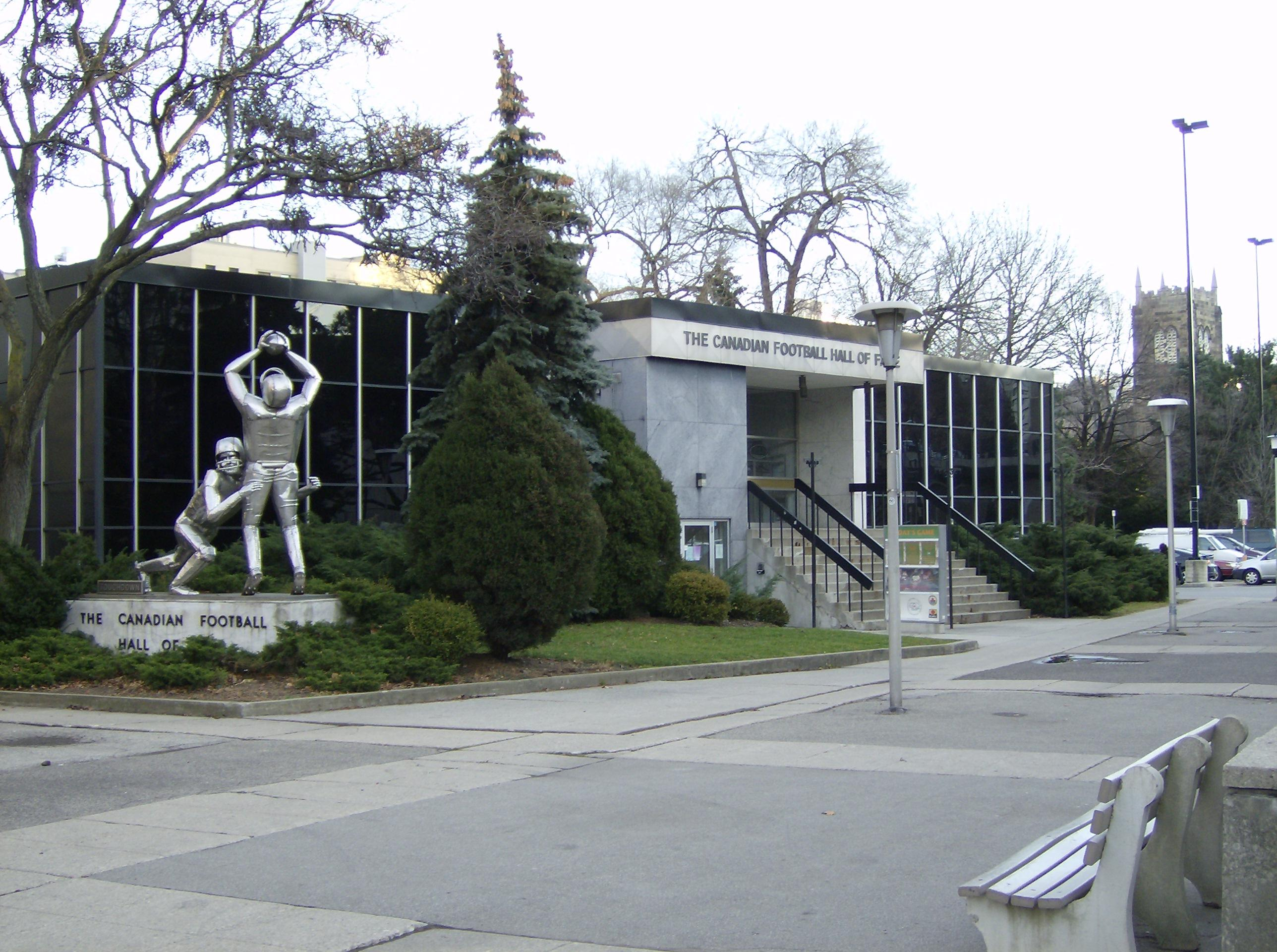
The Canadian Football Hall of Fame and Museum, c. 2007

In addition to writing, Westwick served as a horse racing official, and was on the selection committee for the Canadian Football Hall of Fame from 1964 to 1982. He retired from the Ottawa Journal on August 29, 1973, and was succeeded by Eddie MacCabe as the sports editor, who had been his assistant since 1952.

=== Reputation ===
The Canadian Press journalist Stuart Lake described Westwick as an "old school journalist", a two-fingered typist who signed off with -30- to end his copy, that he "could belt back beers with the best of them" until he quit drinking, and that he "had a deep sense of responsibility for what he wrote and went out of his way not to hurt people with the millions of words that flowed from his typewriter". Eddie MacCabe described Westwick as "always the gentleman", had gained the confidence of athletes and colleagues, and that "he was at pains not to hurt anyone, but never so much that he would take a back step from a testy situation". MacCabe also recalled that Westwick may have appeared disorganized, but never missed a deadline.

"Perhaps [Westwick] never took himself seriously — which is the kind of guy Bill is — but a lot of people did. When Bill said something, he was above all, fair, painstakingly accurate, and although he will disclaim that he was never an expert on anything, spoke from the authority of many years of experience. He always regarded himself primarily as a reporter, and because of his innate and deep-rooted sense of fairness, only took a solid stand after he'd become firmly convinced it was necessary. When he did, it was so thoroughly thought out that you were hard pressed to find a hole in his logic."

— Bob Mellor, Ottawa Citizen

== Personal life ==
Westwick was married to Rita, and had two sons and three daughters. He resided in the Sandy Hill neighbourhood of Ottawa, and had a family cottage on Long Lake near Buckingham, Quebec. He died on June 19, 1990, in Ottawa, and was cremated.

== Honours and awards ==
In 1948, Westwick received the National Press Club of Canada Sports Award for his coverage of the 36th Grey Cup, when the Ottawa Rough Riders lost to Calgary Stampeders. In 1961, he received a Canadian Sports Advisory Council award for encouragement of amateur sport. His career in journalism was also recognized with a Governor General's Award. After his retirement from the Ottawa Journal, he was the guest of honour at a testimonial dinner held at the Château Laurier on October 24, 1973. The dinner was attended by more than 500 people including prominent sports persons. He received lifetime passes to games for the Ottawa Rough Riders and the Ottawa 67's, and a key to the city of Ottawa.

Westwick was inducted into the builder category of the Ottawa Sport Hall of Fame on May 24, 1983, and was inducted into the Football Reporters of Canada section of the Canadian Football Hall of Fame in 1984.
