= Dan Rambo =

Football scout

Personal information
- Born: Libby, Montana, U.S.

Career information
- College: Carroll College

Career history
- 1983–1990: Saskatchewan Roughriders (Dir. of Player Personnel)
- 1990–1991: WLAF (Scout)
- 1992: Ottawa Rough Riders (GM)
- 1993: Denver Broncos (Scout)
- 1994–1997: Saskatchewan Roughriders (Dir. of Player Personnel)
- 1998–2006: Denver Broncos (Scout)
- 2007–2009: Hamilton Tiger-Cats (Dir. of Football Ops.)

Dan Rambo is a Canadian and American football scout, and executive who served as general manager of the Ottawa Rough Riders.

== Playing career ==
Rambo was born in Libby, Montana. He attended Carroll College where he led the NAIA in rushing with an average of 152 yards per game during his senior season. He went undrafted and signed with the New York Giants as a free agent. In 1976 he tried out for the Saskatchewan Roughriders. He was a member of the Oakland Raiders practice squad and played semi-pro football. He stopped playing in 1979 and took a job as the manager of a health club in Helena, Montana.

== Scouting ==
=== Saskatchewan Roughriders ===
In 1982, Oakland Raiders executive John Herrera was named general manager of the Saskatchewan Roughriders. Herrera wanted to hire a friend to serve as the team's chief scout and he hired Rambo, who he knew from when Rambo was on the Raiders practice squad, as director of player personnel. In Saskatchewan, Rambo developed a computerized scouting system. Herrera was fired after the 1984 season, but was kept on by his successors, Bill Quinter, Bill Baker, and Alan Ford. In 1989 the Roughriders won their first Grey Cup in 23 years. In August 1990, Rambo joined the World League of American Football as a scout.

=== Ottawa Rough Riders ===
In 1991, Rambo was named general manager and director of football operations of the Ottawa Rough Riders. Following Rambo's hiring, interim head coach Joe Faragalli resigned due to a dispute with management. After Mike Riley, Tom Higgins, Dennis Meyer, and Joe Paopao all declined the position, Rambo hired Edmonton Eskimos offensive line coach Ron Smeltzer to serve as head coach. Under Rambo and Smeltzer, the Rough Riders finished with a 9-9 record. It was the first time the Rough Riders didn't have a losing record in ten years. In May 1993, Rambo was fired by the Rough Riders due to a dispute with the team's vice-chairman, John Ritchie.

=== Later career ===
Following his dismissal from the Rough Riders, Rambo was hired by the Winnipeg Blue Bombers to scout NFL training camps. He later joined the Denver Broncos as a scout. In February 1994 he returned to the Saskatchewan Roughriders as director of player personnel. He resigned in May 1998 to become a northeast region college scout for the Denver Broncos. He remained with the Broncos until 2006, when he resigned to spend more time with his family. He then worked as a consultant for a group that unsuccessfully sought to bring an expansion franchise to Ottawa. From 2007 to 2009 he was the director of football operations for the Hamilton Tiger-Cats. In the role, Rambo oversaw the team's player recruitment and scouting. After leaving the Tiger-Cats, Rambo co-founded FBXchange - a football scouting software company.
