= Eddie MacCabe =

Canadian sports journalist and writer (1927–1998)

- Born: January 15, 1927; Toronto, Ontario, Canada
- Died: May 22, 1998 (aged 71); Ottawa, Ontario, Canada
- Occupations: Sports journalist, writer
- Known for: Ottawa Journal; Ottawa Citizen
- Awards: Canadian Football Hall of Fame; Ottawa Sport Hall of Fame

Edward William Joseph MacCabe (January 15, 1927 – May 22, 1998) was a Canadian sports journalist and writer. He began in journalism with the Ottawa Journal in 1946, briefly wrote for the Montreal Star from 1951 and 1952, then returned to the Ottawa Journal as a columnist and its sports editor until 1977. He later served as the sports editor at the Ottawa Citizen from 1977 to 1985. He regularly reported on the Ottawa Rough Riders and covered the Grey Cup championship annually from 1947 onward. He was friends with the people he wrote about but could be ruthless when necessary, and relied on the human touch in his writings. He wrote history books for the Ottawa Hunt and Golf Club and the Canada Games, and a biography of football quarterback Russ Jackson. MacCabe detailed the history of Ottawa through sports, and wrote Christmas-themed short stories published annually in the Ottawa Journal and the Ottawa Citizen. He was inducted into the Canadian Football Hall of Fame in 1985, and the Ottawa Sport Hall of Fame in 1994.

== Early life ==
Edward William Joseph MacCabe was born in Toronto, Ontario, on January 15, 1927, into a family with Irish heritage. He was the son of Joseph MacCabe and Winnifred Flynn, and moved to Ottawa at age nine. MacCabe grew up in the Westboro neighbourhood, and his father worked as a typesetter for the Ottawa Journal and handled sports wagers. His father encouraged him to play sports as a youth and participate in the Ottawa Boys & Girls Club as a boxer, where MacCabe was jokingly called "Mighty Mouth MacCabe". He served in the Royal Canadian Air Force, then later attended St. Patrick's College.

== Journalism career ==
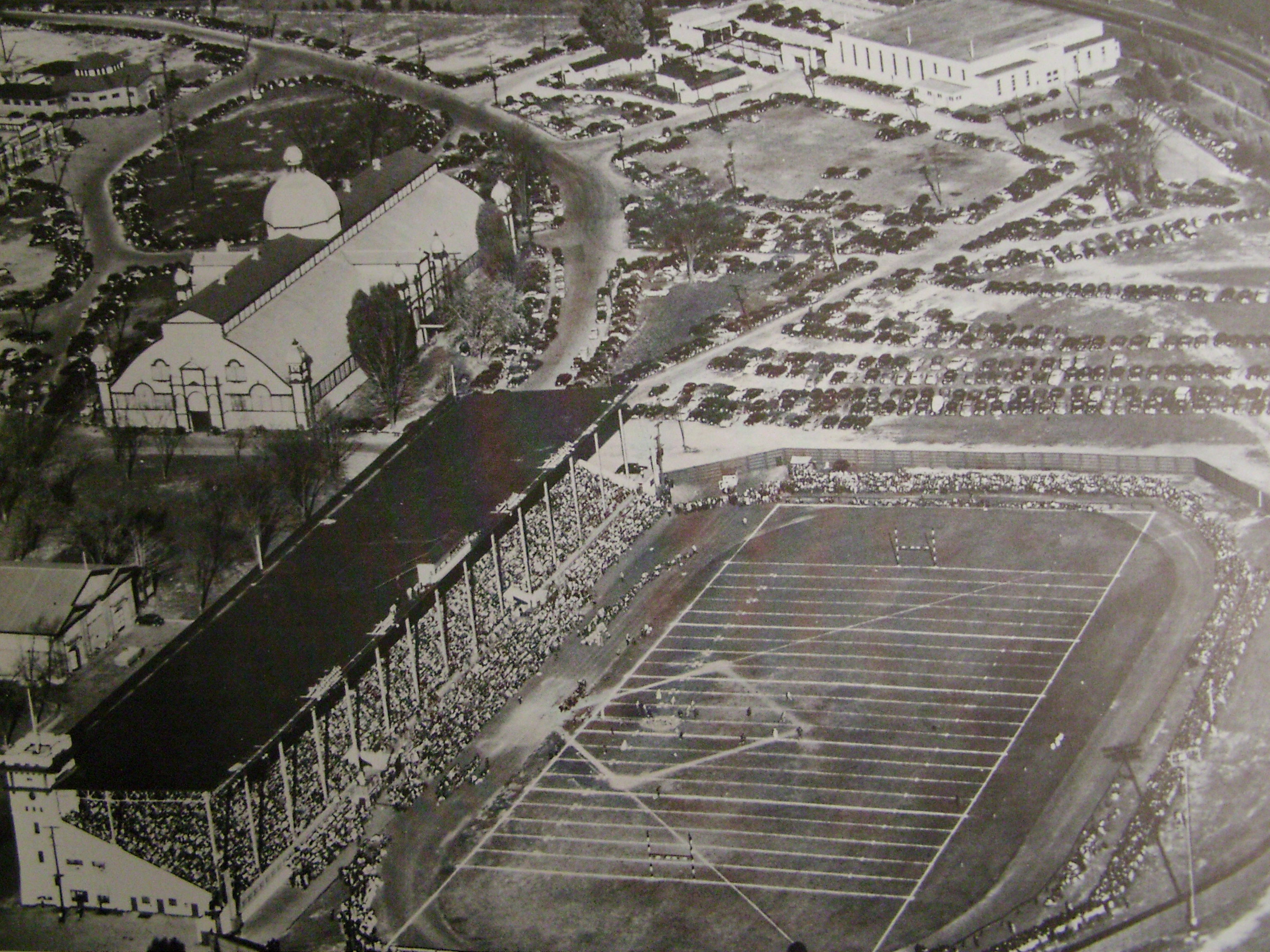
Lansdowne Park c. 1950, home field of the Ottawa Rough Riders

MacCabe began writing for the Ottawa Journal in June 1946, briefly worked for the Montreal Star from 1951 and 1952, then returned to the Ottawa Journal as a columnist and its sports editor until 1977. He succeeded Bill Westwick as the sports editor, who had mentored him since 1952. MacCabe was lured to the Ottawa Citizen in 1977, by its editor who offered more money to have better journalists. He regularly reported on the Ottawa Rough Riders, travelled with the team, and was the link between the players and the community. He covered the Grey Cup championship annually from 1947 onward, and often wrote about amateur golf and boxing, junior ice hockey and high school sports.

Colleagues of MacCabe knew him for storytelling in the newsroom. He often retold a story of when United States president Dwight D. Eisenhower golfed at the Ottawa Hunt and Golf Club in 1959. MacCabe joked that he once bribed a caddie to allow him to carry the golf bag for the president to get an exclusive interview, then after being noticed he was pinned to the ground with guns pointed at his head. MacCabe also claimed that when he covered the 1974 Summit Series in Moscow, he used the credit card of an oil company to visit and write about apartments and a factory in Moscow, despite a request from the Embassy of Canada in Moscow to confine his writing solely to hockey.

Journalist John Besley described MacCabe as, "often provocative and always well-read, some say he defined an age of Ottawa sports history". Luiza Chwialkowska wrote, "MacCabe also gave the capital a glimpse into its own soul by writing columns and stories about Old Ottawa, bringing the street cars, the bars, the characters, the gangs, the boxing rings, the athletes, and their hangers-on to life". According to Dave Brown, MacCabe "knew the writer's job was to find the reader's emotional string, and give it a twang". Brown also said that, MacCabe was friends with the people he wrote about but could be ruthless when necessary; and that MacCabe wrote about sports at a time when it had a closer connection to the community, and that he relied on the human touch in his writings.

MacCabe retired as sports editor of the Ottawa Citizen after a heart attack in 1985, then worked occasionally as a freelancer.

== Sports administrator ==
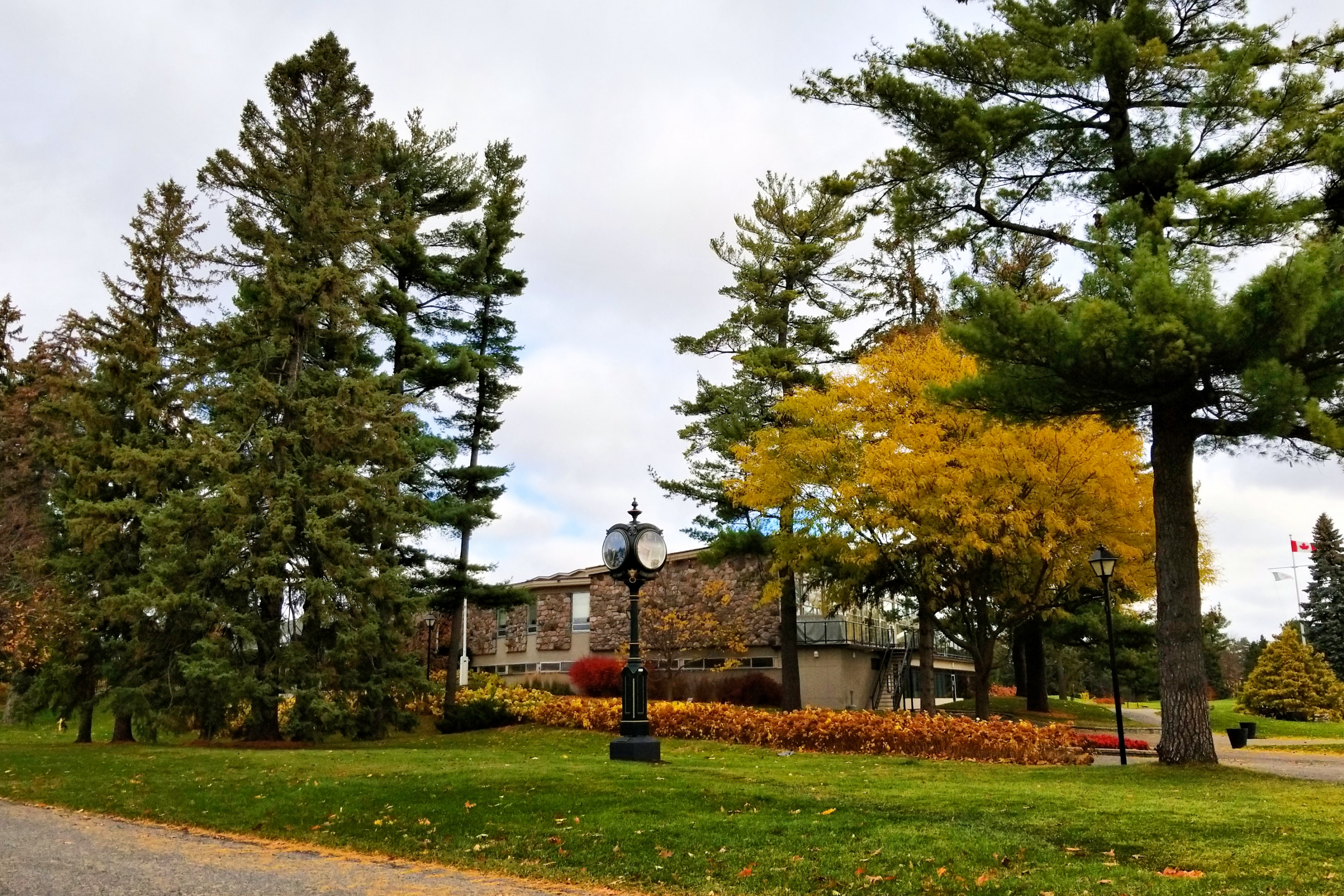
The Ottawa Hunt and Golf Club clubhouse

MacCabe served on the board of directors for the Ottawa Sport Hall of Fame, the Ottawa Hunt and Golf Club, and the Quebec Golf Association. He also sat on the selection committees of the Canadian Football Hall of Fame and the Ottawa Sport Hall of Fame.

== Published works ==
During the 1950s, MacCabe wrote plays on the sport of boxing, televised by NBC in the United States. He wrote history books for the 75th anniversary of the Ottawa Hunt and Golf Club, and the 25th anniversary of the Canada Games. He also wrote a biography of Russ Jackson, the quarterback of the Rough Riders from 1958 to 1969. He wrote Christmas-themed short stories published annually in the Ottawa Journal and the Ottawa Citizen, one of which was televised in 1993.

List of books:

- MacCabe, Eddie (1969). Profile of a Pro: The Russ Jackson Story. Scarborough, Ontario: Prentice Hall. OCLC 869502215.
- MacCabe, Eddie (1983). The Ottawa Hunt Club: 75 Years of History, 1908–1983. Gloucester, Ontario: Ottawa Hunt and Golf Club. OCLC 708723975.
- MacCabe, Eddie (1992). Canada Games, 1967 to 1992: The Official Retrospective of the Canada Games. Ottawa, Ontario: Canada Games Council. OCLC 319697919.

== Personal life ==
MacCabe was married twice and had two daughters. According to his daughter, MacCabe's favourite meal was spaghetti and meatballs. He competed as an amateur boxer; and played ice hockey, golf, and the banjo. He also volunteered his time with the Ottawa Boys & Girls Club. He moved to Carleton Place when he retired in 1987. He died on May 22, 1998, at the Ottawa Civic Hospital, due to complications of surgery for colon cancer. His funeral at St. George's Catholic Church was attended by dignitaries including Clayton Kenny, John Turner, Brian Kilrea, Patrick MacAdam, Keith Davey, and players from the Ottawa Rough Riders.

Later in life, MacCabe advocated for information on colon cancer to become more available to patients. After his death, his daughters planned to publish a book of his Christmas stories and donate the proceeds toward their fundraising campaign for a colon cancer centre in Ottawa.

== Honours and legacy ==
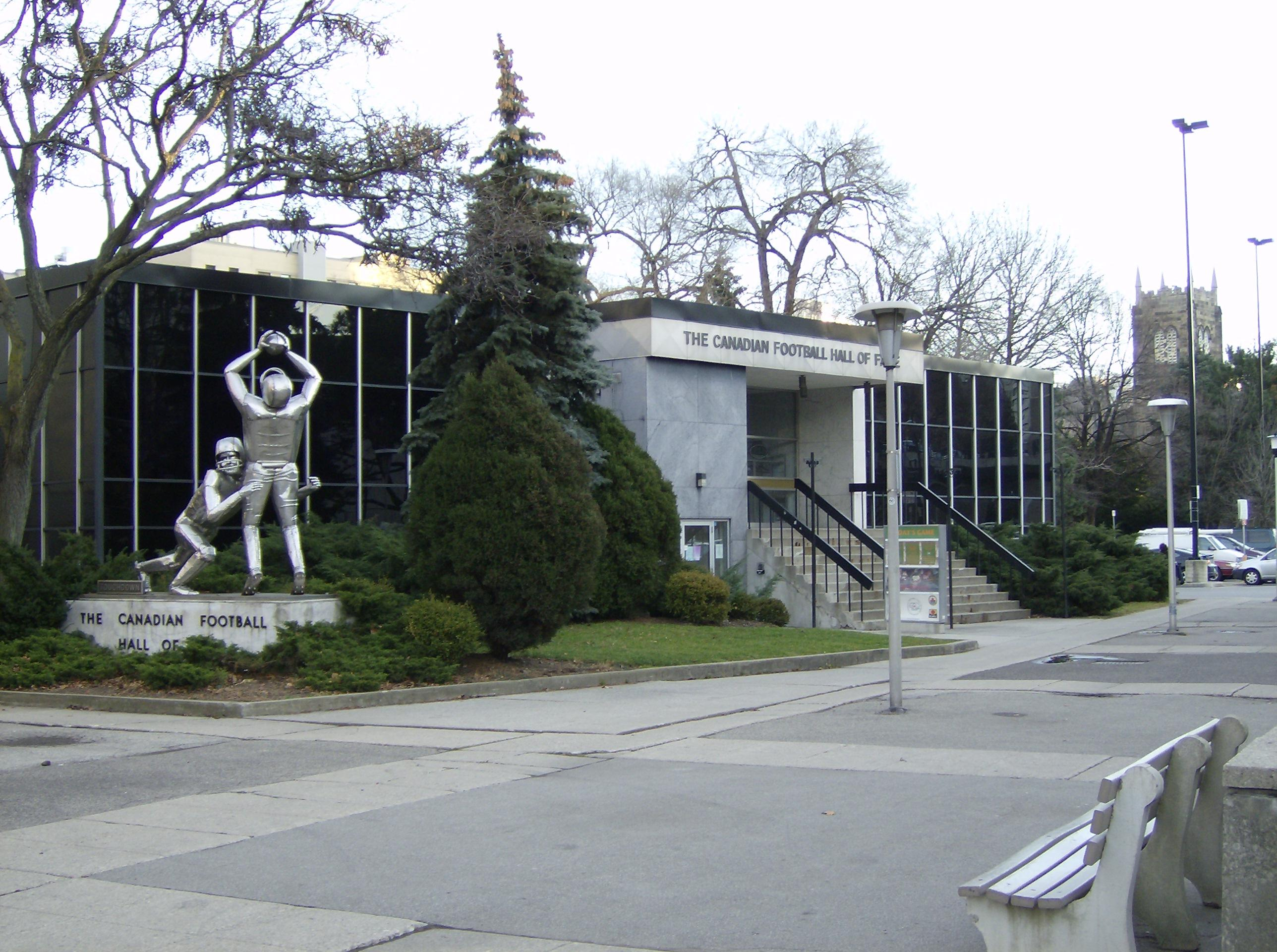
The Canadian Football Hall of Fame and Museum, c. 2007

MacCabe received the Dow Award in 1960, a prize given by Dow Breweries to recognize the best sportswriter in Canadian football. In June 1983, he was the guest of honour at a testimonial dinner held at the Ottawa Civic Centre attended by more than 1,000 people, which raised $15,000 for the Ottawa Boys and Girls Club.

MacCabe was inducted into the Football Reporters of Canada section of the Canadian Football Hall of Fame in 1985. When he was inducted into the builder category of the Ottawa Sport Hall of Fame in 1994, MacCabe estimated that he had written about or knew 90 per cent of the other 162 inductees. He also received a citation of merit from the Government of Canada for contributions to amateur sport, and was inducted into the Canadian Sportswriters Hall of Fame.

In 2005, he posthumously became a partial namesake of the Ernie Calcutt/Eddie MacCabe/Brian Smith Memorial Lifetime Achievement Award, established by the Ottawa Sport Award Society to recognize careers in journalism.
