= Basil O'Meara =

Canadian sports journalist (1892–1971)

- Born: June 5, 1892; Ontario, Canada
- Died: October 25, 1971 (aged 79); Montreal, Quebec, Canada
- Occupation: journalist
- Years active: 1910 – c. 1968
- Employer: Montreal Star
- Awards: Elmer Ferguson Memorial Award (1984)

Basil Edmund "Baz" O'Meara (June 5, 1892 – October 25, 1971), was a Canadian sports journalist. A columnist for the Montreal Star, he won the Elmer Ferguson Memorial Award in 1984 and is a member of the media section of the Hockey Hall of Fame. In 1979, he was inducted into the Canadian Football Hall of Fame.

O'Meara began his career at the Ottawa Free Press in 1910. He was the sports editor of the Ottawa Journal during the 1920s, and mentored his successor Bill Westwick. He joined the Star in 1929 and retired at the age of 76 around 1968. Although controversy exists over this claim, he was widely credited with nicknaming Maurice Richard "Rocket".

O'Meara died on October 25, 1971 in a Montreal hospital at age 79. He had entered the facility roughly one week before, after suffering a heart attack, and never regained consciousness.
