= Ron Smeltzer =

American gridiron football coach (born 1941)

Personal information
- Born: October 29, 1941 (age 85); York, Pennsylvania, U.S.

Career information
- College: West Chester University

Career history
- 1968–1969: Colorado (GA)
- 1970–1971: UC Santa Barbara (OL)
- 1972–1977: UNLV (OL)
- 1979–1983: Servite High School (HC)
- 1984–1985: BC Lions (OL)
- 1986–1987: Calgary Stampeders (OC)
- 1988: BC Lions (OL)
- 1989: BC Lions (OC/OL)
- 1990: Holy Cross Regional High School (HC)
- 1991: Edmonton Eskimos (OL)
- 1992–1993: Ottawa Rough Riders (HC)
- 1994: Las Vegas Posse (OC)
- 1995–2000: Cimarron-Memorial High School (Asst.)
- 2001–2002: Coronado High School (HC)
- 2003–2007: Cimarron-Memorial High School (HC)

Ron Smeltzer is a retired American and Canadian football coach who served as the head coach of the Ottawa Rough Riders from 1992 to 1993.

== Early life ==
Smeltzer was born on October 29, 1941, in York, Pennsylvania. When he was 17 he joined the United States Marine Corps. After a four year hitch he attended West Chester University, where he played center and linebacker.

== Coaching career ==
Smeltzer began his coaching career as a graduate assistant at Colorado from 1968 to 1969. He then spent two seasons as the offensive line coach at UC Santa Barbara. From 1972 to 1977 he was the offensive line coach at UNLV. While at UNLV, Smeltzer met his wife, who was an undergrad at the university.

From 1979 to 1983, Smeltzer served as head coach of Servite High School in Anaheim, California. In 1982 he switched from a veer offense to a pro-type passing offense led by Quarterback Steve Beuerlein. The team won the state championship in 1982 and 1983. In 1984 he joined the BC Lions as offensive line coach. He remained with the team until 1986 when he followed fellow Lions assistant Bob Vespaziani to the Calgary Stampeders. He was not retained by Vespaziani's successor Lary Kuharich and returned to the Lions in 1988. In 1989 he was given the additional duties of offensive coordinator. He was not retained for the 1990 season and instead became a full-time teacher and head coach at Holy Cross Regional High School. In 1991 he became the offensive line coach of the Edmonton Eskimos.

On February 10, 1992, Smeltzer was named head coach of the Ottawa Rough Riders. His hiring came after Mike Riley, Tom Higgins, Dennis Meyer, and Joe Paopao all declined the position. He was the Rough Riders seventh coach in seven years. In his first season, Smeltzer led the team to a 9–9 record. It was the first time the Rough Riders did not have a losing record in ten years. Following general manager Dan Rambo's departure, Smeltzer was given the additional role of director of football operations. The Rough Riders went 4-14 in 1993 and Smeltzer was fired at the end of the season.

In 1994 Smeltzer joined Ron Meyer, who he had worked under at UNLV, as offensive coordinator of the Las Vegas Posse. The club folded after one year and Smeltzer chose to remain in Las Vegas rather than uproot his family again. He was the lead assistant at Cimarron-Memorial High School from 1995 to 2000 and helped lead the team to state championships in 1998 and 1999. From 2001 to 2002 he was the head coach at Coronado High School. He was the school's first ever football coach and lead the team to a 7–9 record. In 2003 he returned to Cimarron-Memorial, this time as head coach. At both Coronado and Cimarron, Smeltzer coached future Harvard and LSU quarterback Andrew Hatch. Smeltzer retired from coaching following the 2007 season.
