= Jo-Anne Polak =

Chair of Football Canada
- Incumbent
- Assumed office July 2, 2025
- Preceded by: Peter Baxter

Personal details
- Born: Jo-Anne Polak; 1959 St. John's, Newfoundland and Labrador, Canada
- Party: Conservative (federal); Progressive Conservative (provincial)
- Other political affiliations: Progressive Conservative (federal; until 2003)
- Education: University of Waterloo
- Football career

Career information
- College: Waterloo

Career history
- 1989–1991: Ottawa Rough Riders (general manager)

Jo-Anne Polak (born 1959) is a Canadian businesswoman who was the general manager of the Ottawa Rough Riders from 1989 to 1991. Upon her appointment, Polak became the first woman executive in the Canadian Football League and the first woman general manager to lead a North American sports team. After leaving the Rough Riders, Polak primarily worked at Hill & Knowlton Canada as their vice president between the 1990s and 2000s. After becoming a general manager for Canada Post in 2008, she was named Vice President of Communications in 2011. She left the job at Canada Post in January 2025.

== Early life and education ==
In 1959, Polak was born in St. John's, Newfoundland and Labrador. Her mother was a nurse while her father was a pathologist. Polak was part of a choir while she grew up in Barrie, Ontario. While Polak was in school, she joined the Progressive Conservative Party of Canada's youth group. Polak attended the University of Waterloo in the environmental studies program.

== Career ==
As an adult, Polak continued to remain with the Progressive Conservatives and worked for Member of Parliament Susan Fish and Phil Gillies. She was also a campaign organizer for John Crosbie in 1983 and Larry Grossman in 1985. During her political career, Polak became an account manager for an Ottawa public relations company in 1984. While in public relations, Polak joined the Ottawa Rough Riders in 1987.

For the Rough Riders, Polak was initially named business manager in December 1988, and became a co-general manager alongside Steve Goldman later that month. As general manager, Polak became the first woman to hold an executive role in the Canadian Football League and the first woman general manager of a North American sports team. During this time period, Polak was the alternate governor for the Rough Riders between 1989 and 1991. She held the position of general manager until stepping down in November 1991.

After leaving the Rough Riders, Polak was briefly a radio host from 1992 to 1993 before working at Hill & Knowlton Canada as the company's vice president until 2007. Polak went on to work in communications at Canada Post as general manager in 2008 before her promotion to vice president of communications in 2011. She left the job at Canada Post in January 2025.

On July 2, 2025, it was announced that Polak would be joining the Football Canada Board of Directors as its new Chairperson, succeeding Peter Baxter.

== Honours and personal life ==
Polak received the Order of Ottawa during 2025. She is married with two step-children.
