= Ernie Calcutt =

Canadian sports commentator and radio news director (1932–1984)

- Born: November 1, 1932; Ottawa, Ontario, Canada
- Died: January 10, 1984 (aged 51); Ottawa, Ontario, Canada
- Resting place: Notre-Dame Cemetery, Ottawa
- Occupations: Sports commentator and radio news director
- Known for: Ottawa Rough Riders and CFRA
- Awards: Canadian Football Hall of Fame; Ottawa Sport Hall of Fame

Ernest George Calcutt (November 1, 1932 – January 10, 1984) was a Canadian sports commentator and radio news director. He worked for CFRA 580-AM in Ottawa, and was the voice for the Ottawa Rough Riders radio broadcasts from 1964 to 1983. He served as president of the Canadian Football Reporters, and was inducted into both the Canadian Football Hall of Fame and the Ottawa Sport Hall of Fame.

== Early life and education ==
Ernest George Calcutt was born on November 1, 1932, in Ottawa, Ontario, the son of Allan and Doris Calcutt. He grew up in the Centretown neighbourhood of Ottawa, was an altar boy at St Patrick's Basilica and frequented the Ottawa Auditorium as a youth. He played Canadian football and ice hockey, and attended St. Patrick's High School. He was married, and had five children.

== Radio career and community work ==
Calcutt began working for CFRA 580-AM radio part-time in 1961. He also worked with Metropolitan Life Insurance for 12 years, until he joined CRFA full-time in 1964. He became the station's sports director in 1965, and then its news director in 1968. He broadcast sports news reports every 30 minutes, gave a daily morning commentary and hosted a public affairs talk show.

Calcutt was the English language radio sports commentator for the Ottawa Rough Riders from 1964 to 1983. The Ottawa Citizen described Calcutt as having an encyclopedic knowledge of Canadian football, and that he was candid about the Ottawa Rough Riders and not intimidated to give criticism despite that the team and radio station had common ownership. During his broadcast tenure, the team competed in six Grey Cup games and won four Canadian Football League championships. He was credited for having a sense of on-air humour, and for coining the phrases "pulling an el foldo" and "being as wide open as a church door on a Sunday morning". He also served as president of the Canadian Football Reporters, and was a recurring host of the Schenley Award for the league's most valuable player.

Calcutt served as a director with the Ottawa Boys and Girls Club, and was a founding member of both the Ottawa Sport Hall of Fame in 1968, and the Children's Hospital of Eastern Ontario in 1974. He was a frequent master of ceremonies for the Ottawa Sports Awards annual dinner, and made contributions to the Easter Seals telethon hosted in Ottawa. He helped establish Operation Go Home, to return runaway children to their families. The Ottawa Police Service credited his efforts for taking 15,000 children off the streets in 11 years.

Calcutt died on January 10, 1984, in Ottawa, Ontario, due to a stroke. His funeral at St Patrick's Basilica was reported to have been attended by at least one thousand people. His remains were cremated and a memorial was erected at Notre-Dame Cemetery in Ottawa. He was succeeded by John Badham as the radio announcer for the Ottawa Rough Riders and the sports director of CFRA.

== Posthumous honours ==
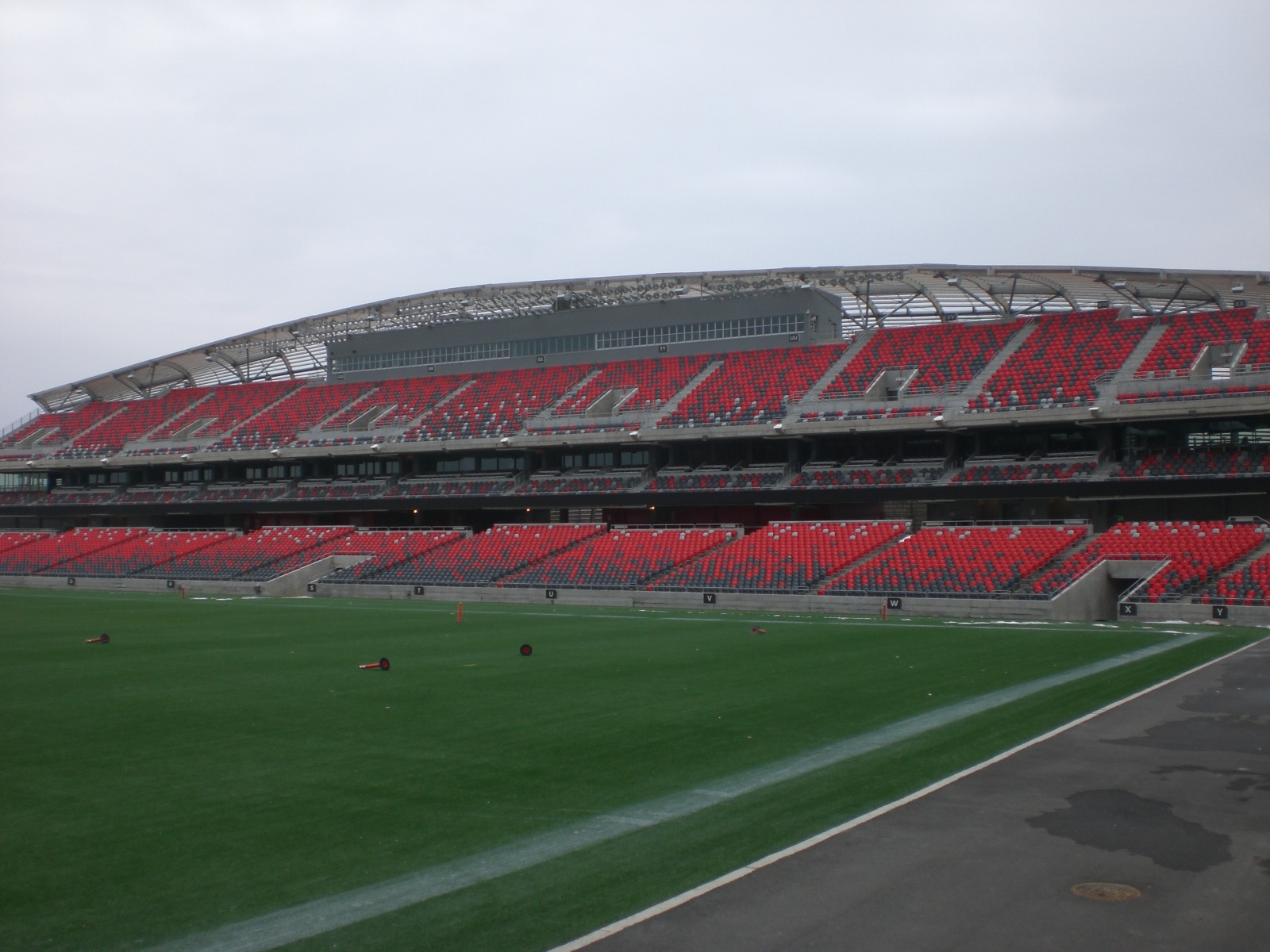
South stand at TD Place Stadium including the press box named for Calcutt

The City of Ottawa made him the namesake of Ernie Calcutt Park in 1984. The new artificial turf field at Lansdowne Park Stadium was also named for Calcutt in 1984. He was inducted into the builder category of the Ottawa Sports Hall of Fame in 1988. He was named to the honour roll of Sports Media Canada, and is a partial namesake of the Ernie Calcutt/Eddie MacCabe/Brian Smith Memorial Award for Lifetime Achievement in Sports Media in Ottawa.

On October 29, 2014, the press box and media centre at the renovated TD Place Stadium were named for Calcutt. He was inducted into the football reporters section of Canadian Football Hall of Fame on November 26, 2017, in a ceremony at the 105th Grey Cup game played in Ottawa.
