= George McPhail =

Canadian football player

Profile
- Position: Halfback

Personal information
- Born: c. 1928
- Died: St. Catharines, Ontario, Canada
- Listed height: 5 ft 9 in (1.75 m)
- Listed weight: 160 lb (73 kg)

Career history
- 1948: Ottawa Rough Riders
- 1949: Regina Roughriders
- 1950–1952: Winnipeg Blue Bombers
- 1953: Montreal Alouettes

George McPhail (born c. 1928) was a Canadian football player who played for the Ottawa Rough Riders, Regina Roughriders, Winnipeg Blue Bombers and Montreal Alouettes.
