= Christine E. Silverberg =

Canadian lawyer and police chief

Christine E. Silverberg (born 1949) is a Canadian lawyer who was the first female Chief of the Calgary Police Service and later practiced law alongside Hersh Wolch, who famously won David Milgaard's wrongful conviction case.

Silverberg was born in Brampton, Ontario and met her husband Ben Silverberg in Toronto while earning a B.A. in political science at York University, working as an undercover police officer and then working for the Ontario Solicitor-General's Office. She later finished an M.A. in criminology from the University of Toronto and was appointed Chief of the Calgary Police Service in 1995, which she remained at until 2000. Silverberg then gained admission to the Faculty of Law at the University of Calgary, graduating with a J.D. degree in 2003, and then practiced at Gowlings where she was named Partner in 2008.

Silverberg additionally completed the Queen's University School of Business Executive Program and is certified with the F.B.I.'s National Executive Institute. She was named among Canada's 100 Most Powerful Women in 2004 and is the recipient of the B'nai B'rith Woman of Valour Award. In 2010 Silverberg was appointed by the Lieutenant Governor in Council of Alberta to Hearing Tribunals established under the Health Professions Act of Alberta.

Since 2008 she practiced law at Wolch deWitt Silverberg & Watts. She currently practices at SilverbergLegal in Calgary.
