= Ottawa Journal =

Canadian newspaper

- Type: Daily
- Format: Broadsheet
- Owner(s): F.P. Publications (1959–1980); Thomson (1980 closure)
- Founded: 10 December 1885
- Ceased publication: 27 August 1980
- Language: English
- Headquarters: Ottawa, Ontario, Canada
- ISSN: 0841-4572

The Ottawa Journal was a daily broadsheet newspaper published in Ottawa, Ontario, Canada, from 1885 to 1980.

== History ==
The newspaper, originally called the Ottawa Evening Journal, was founded in 1885 by Alexander Smith Woodburn (1832-1904). Woodburn had been in the printing business for decades, having apprenticed in the late 1840s and early 1850s under Dawson Kerr, publisher of The Orange Lily, one of Bytown's early literary newspapers. By 1860, he and John George Bell (who had previously published the Bytown Packet) had established a printing office on Elgin Street under the name of Bell & Woodburn. After Bell retired in May 1872, Woodburn continued the business on his own.

The newspaper's office was originally located at 36 Elgin Street (now 40 Elgin St.), where Woodburn's (and previously Bell & Woodburn's) printing business had been operating from since the building was constructed in 1867. The first edition was published on 10 December 1885, and in it Woodburn gave his reasoning for starting the paper. He stated that Ottawa was lacking an "able and independent" newspaper and needed a daily that was "of high moral tone, free from partizanship and party prejudices." Ottawa had an existing English-language newspaper, the Ottawa Citizen (then the Daily Citizen), which Woodburn felt was too partisan.

The newspaper's first editor was John Wesley Dafoe. In early May 1886, he left the Evening Journal to join the staff of the Manitoba Free Press, which was later renamed the Winnipeg Free Press. He was succeeded by Arthur H. U. Colquohoun of the Montreal Star.

The Evening Journal soon faced financial difficulties, racking up several thousand dollars of debt by the end of 1886. Philip Dansken Ross, then editor of the Montreal Star, paid Woodburn $4,000 in exchange for a half interest in the newspaper. Their partnership came into effect on 1 January 1887 and was announced two days later. Their partnership was dissolved on 31 October 1891, with Ross purchasing Woodburn's interest in the newspaper.

The Evening Journal expanded in June 1887. On 4 June, the Saturday edition of the Journal doubled in size to eight pages long, while the rest of the daily editions remained four pages. On 6 June, Woodburn and Ross began publishing the Semi-Weekly Journal twice a week to service the rural areas surrounding Ottawa. In 1899, the Semi-Weekly Journal would be renamed the Ottawa Valley Journal, and in 1917, it became the Ottawa Farm Journal.

In 1892, the business became a joint stock company and gained a charter of incorporation from the provincial government; publishing was afterward carried out by The Journal Printing Company (Limited) with P. D. Ross as the managing director and editor. In 1893, the newspaper was enlarged to an eight-page paper after the purchase of a new Goss Straight-Line Newspaper Perfecting Press, which dramatically sped up the printing process.

The newspaper office moved from 36 Elgin St. to 34 Elgin St. on 1 March 1894. By 1912, the Evening Journal would occupy both 34 and 36 Elgin St.

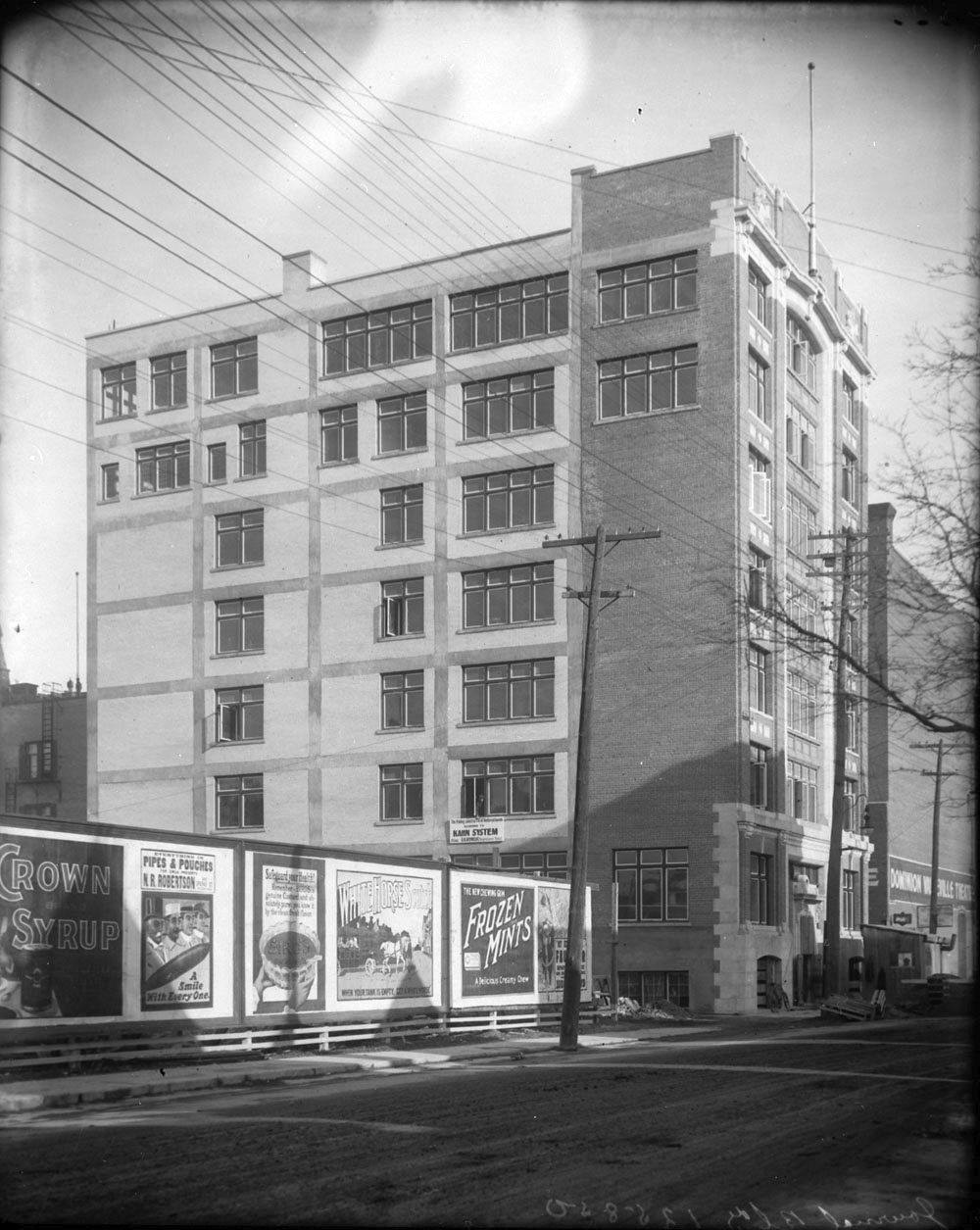
The Ottawa Journal Building (233-237 Queen St.) by Topley Studios, Nov 1913. Topley Studio Fonds / Library and Archives Canada / PA-042717

The Evening Journal continued to expand its operations. A new building was constructed at 233-237 Queen St. in 1913 for around $180,000. It was designed by architect Arthur LeBaron Weeks. Made of brick and Indiana limestone, the eight-storey building used the Kahn system of reinforced concrete and was claimed to be fireproof. The newspaper equipment, departments, and office occupied the basement, first and second floors, and sixth to eighth floors. The third to fifth floors were offices that could be leased to the public. The newspaper moved to its new building on 10 January 1914.

At the end of 1916, the Journal Publishing Co. announced that it would be taking over the property, assets, and franchise of the Ottawa Free Press. P. D. Ross had briefly owned the Free Press about a decade earlier; he and the Southams, who owned the Ottawa Citizen, had purchased the paper together in 1905. Having multiple English-language newspapers in Ottawa created a lot of competition, so it is believed that Ross and the Southams purchased the Free Press with the intention of letting it "simmer on the back burner" and to prevent anyone else from reviving the declining paper. In December 1905, they hired Ernest Norman Smith to act as editor and managing director of the Free Press. However, Ross and the Southams faced criticism when the purchase became known to the public. The Free Press was a Liberal publication, while the Citizen was Conservative and the Evening Journal was Independent but Conservative leaning. Rather than close the Free Press, which would create an opportunity for a new Liberal newspaper to be established, Ross and the Southams sold it to Smith on 1 January 1907.

The merge in 1916 was caused, in part, by the First World War, which increased the cost of newsprint, labour, and equipment. In his book News and the Southams, Charles Bruce wrote:

"War costs, finally, convinced all hands there wasn't room for three. And by that time the Citizen's swing to independence and beyond - a swing so pronounced as to make the establishment of a new Liberal paper unlikely - had cleared the way to absorption of the Free Press by the Journal."

The last edition of the Free Press was published on 30 December 1916. The Ottawa Free Press Ltd., the company that published the newspaper, was dissolved the following day. E. Norman Smith, who had been president of the Ottawa Free Press Ltd., became the Vice President of the Journal Publishing Co. He also became the editor of both the Evening Journal and its new morning paper called the Morning Journal-Press, which was first published on 1 January 1917. In February 1919, the name of the morning paper was shortened to the Morning Journal.

In 1959, the newspaper was purchased by F.P. Publications. By then, the Journal, whose readers tended to come from rural areas, was trailing the Ottawa Citizen, its main competitor. The paper encountered labour problems in the 1970s and never really recovered.

In 1980, the Journal was bought by Thomson Newspapers and was closed on 27 August 1980. That left Southam Newspapers's Ottawa Citizen as the only major English-language newspaper in Ottawa (Le Droit remaining the only French-language daily newspaper in Ottawa).

The closure aroused considerable controversy since a day later, Southam closed the Winnipeg Tribune, the primary rival to Thomson's Winnipeg Free Press. Concern over both incidents prompted the Government of Canada to conduct the Royal Commission on Newspapers, commonly known as the Kent Commission.

To many, it seemed that possibly-illegal collusion to reduce competition had occurred. Charges were brought against both Southam and Thomson in April 1981 under the now-defunct Combines Investigation Act that alleged a breach of section 33 by merger or monopolistic conduct, but they were dismissed on 9 December 1983.

Ottawa went without a second major newspaper until the debut of the Ottawa Sun in 1988.

The paper's politics were generally regarded as conservative.

== Notable staff ==
- Basil O'Meara, sports editor during the 1920s
- Bill Westwick, columnist and sports editor from 1926 to 1973
- Eddie MacCabe, columnist and sports editor from 1946 to 1977

== Sources ==
- Smith, I. Norman (1974). The Journal Men: P. D. Ross, E. Norman Smith and Grattan O'Leary of The Ottawa Journal: Three Great Canadian Newspapermen and the Tradition They Created. Toronto: McClelland and Stewart Limited. ISBN 0771081928.
- Bruce, Charles (1968). News and the Southams. Toronto: Macmillan.
