= Chan Caldwell =

Canadian football coach (1920–2000)

Profile
- Position: Wide receiver

Personal information
- Born: January 6, 1920; Knoxville, Tennessee, U.S.
- Died: June 14, 2000 (aged 80)

Career information
- College: Tennessee

Career history
- 1955: Ottawa Rough Riders

Charles Andrew Caldwell (January 6, 1920 – June 14, 2000) was an American professional football coach who served as the head coach of the Ottawa Rough Riders in 1955. He played college football at Tennessee.

== Early life and education ==
Caldwell was born on January 6, 1920, in Knoxville, Tennessee. He played college football at Tennessee. He played two seasons of college football. In 1946, he had four catches for 37 yards. In 1947 he had four catches for 48 yards.

== Coaching career ==
In 1955, Caldwell was the head coach of the Ottawa Rough Riders. He had a record of 3–9.

== Head coaching record ==
Team	Year	Regular season					Postseason		
Team	Year	Won	Lost	Ties	Win %	Finish	Won	Lost	Result
OTT	1955	3	9	0	.250	4th in IRFU	–	–	Missed playoffs
Total		3	9	0	.250	0 IRFU; Championships	–	–	

== Death ==
Caldwell died on June 14, 2000, at the age of 80.
