= 1972–73 Nationalliga A season =

Swiss professional ice hockey season

The 1972–73 Nationalliga A season was the 35th season of the Nationalliga A, the top level of ice hockey in Switzerland. Eight teams participated in the league, and HC La Chaux-de-Fonds won the championship.

== Standings ==
Pl.	Team	GP	W	T	L	GF–GA	Pts
1.	HC La Chaux-de-Fonds	28	19	2	7	153:85	40
2.	HC Sierre	28	16	3	9	127:113	35
3.	EHC Kloten	28	13	1	14	94:108	27
4.	HC Servette Genève	28	10	6	12	115:108	26
5.	SC Langnau	28	11	4	13	114:132	26
6.	HC Ambrì-Piotta	28	10	5	13	111:116	25
7.	EHC Visp	28	10	4	14	92:105	24
8.	HC Lugano	28	9	3	16	90:129	21
