= McKinstry's Mills Historic District =

Historic district in Maryland, United States

- U.S. National Register of Historic Places
- U.S. Historic district
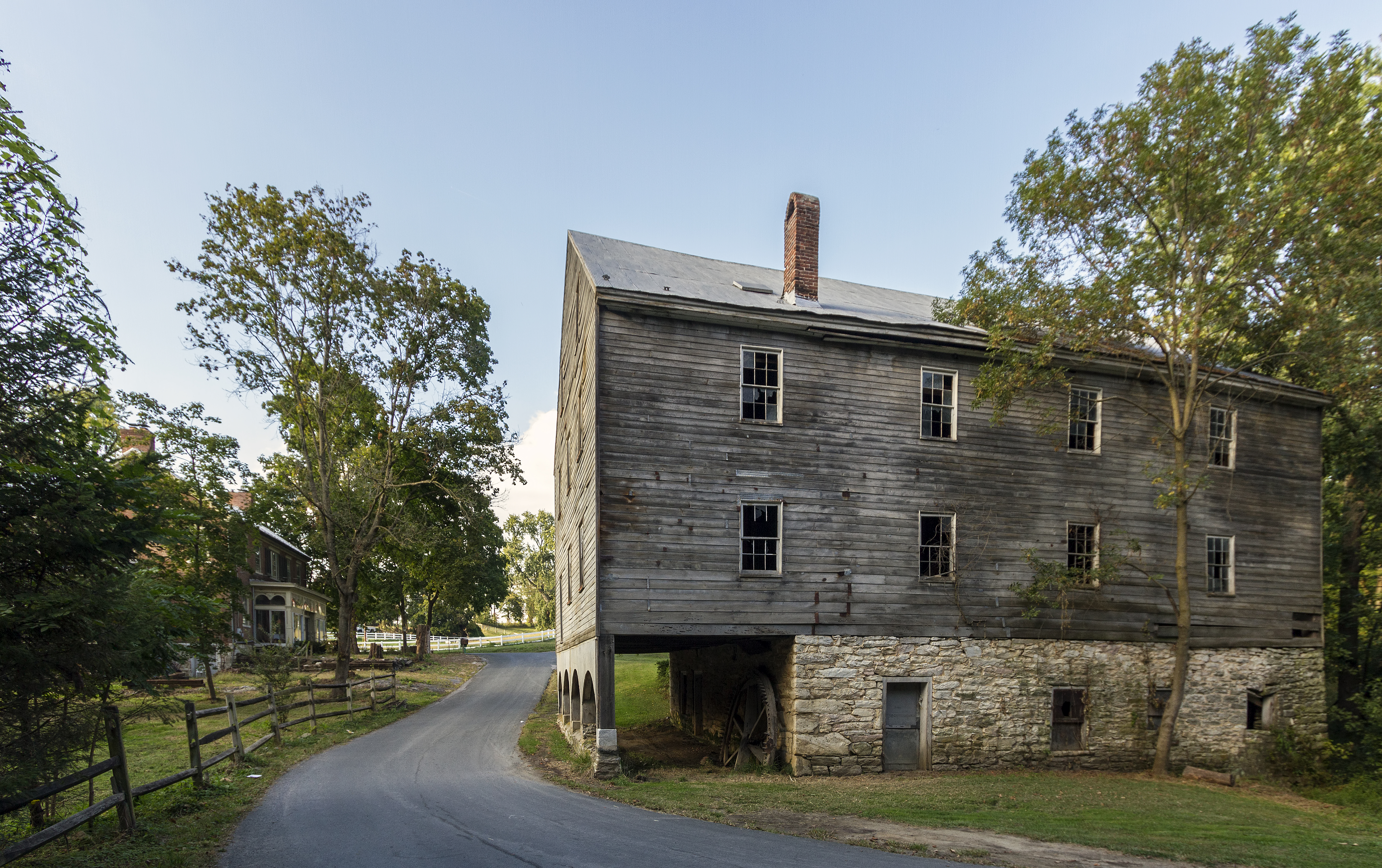
- McKinstry's Mill and house

- Location within Maryland Location within the United States
- Nearest city: Union Bridge, Maryland
- Coordinates: 39°32′0″N 77°09′32″W
- Area: 26 acres (11 ha)
- Built: 1844
- Built by: Wolfe, Joseph
- Architectural style: Warren pony truss
- NRHP reference No.: 97000338
- Added to NRHP: April 16, 1997

The McKinstry's Mills Historic District is a national historic district in Union Bridge, located in Carroll and Frederick County, Maryland. The district comprises the entirety of the settlement of McKinstry's Mills, a 26-acre (110,000 m^{2}) hamlet consisting of six separate properties that were owned and developed in the 19th century by the McKinstry family, local millers. At the center is a 3 1/2-story grist mill constructed in 1844. Also included are the McKinstry homestead, built between 1825 and 1835; the residence of miller Samuel McKinstry, dated 1849; a store building of 1850; and two other small houses and a variety of outbuildings. There is also a 1908 Warren pony truss bridge.

It was added to the National Register of Historic Places in 1997.
