= William McKinstry Jr. House =

Historic house in Massachusetts, United States

- U.S. National Register of Historic Places
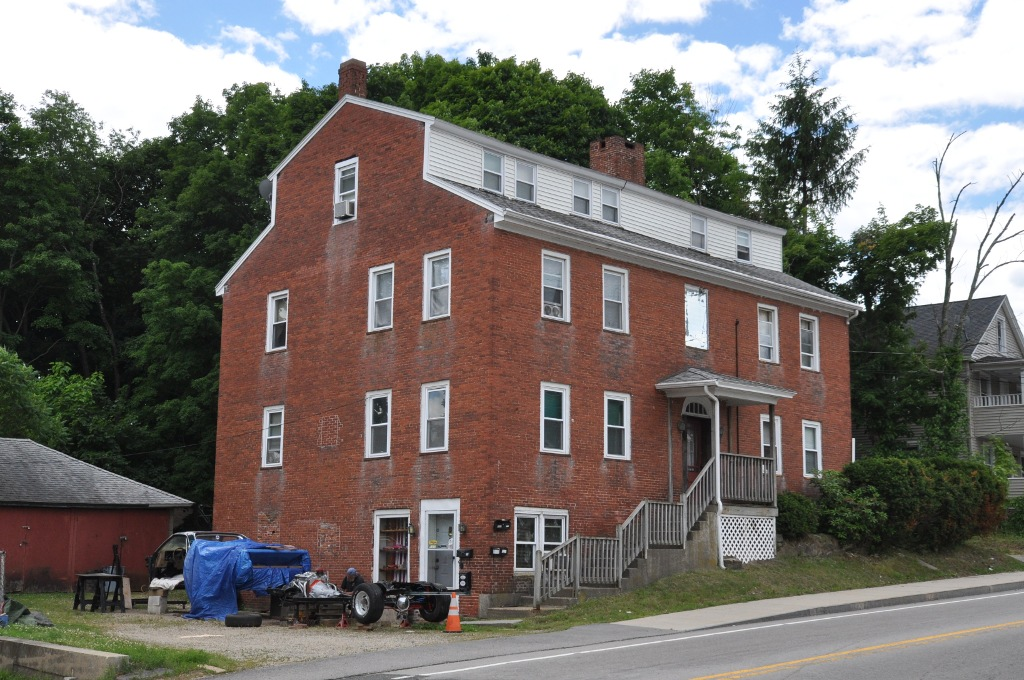

- Location within Massachusetts Location within the United States
- Location: 915 W. Main St., Southbridge, Massachusetts
- Coordinates: 42°5′28″N 72°2′31″W
- Built: 1815
- Architectural style: Federal
- MPS: Southbridge MRA
- NRHP reference No.: 89000528
- Added to NRHP: June 22, 1989

The William McKinstry Jr. House is a historic house at 915 W. Main Street in Southbridge, Massachusetts. It is a 2+ story building, unusual because of its distinctive monitor roof. Its construction date is unknown, but it is documented in a painting of Southbridge's Globe Village area in 1822. It appears to have been intended for housing, but the monitor roof is more typically associated with mill buildings. It is known to have been occupied by William McKinstry Jr., son of an early Southbridge settler, in 1836.

The house was listed on the National Register of Historic Places in 1989.

== See also ==
- National Register of Historic Places listings in Southbridge, Massachusetts
- National Register of Historic Places listings in Worcester County, Massachusetts
