= 1970–71 Nationalliga A season =

Swiss ice hockey season

The 1970–71 Nationalliga A season was the 33rd season of the Nationalliga A, the top level of ice hockey in Switzerland. Eight teams participated in the league, and HC La Chaux-de-Fonds won the championship.

== First round ==
Pl.	Team	GP	W	T	L	GF–GA	Pts
1.	HC La Chaux-de-Fonds	14	12	2	0	93:28	26
2.	HC Servette Genève	14	10	1	3	81:44	21
3.	EHC Kloten	14	8	2	4	73:59	18
4.	HC Sierre	14	7	2	5	58:57	16
5.	HC Ambrì-Piotta	14	6	1	7	45:65	13
6.	SC Langnau	14	4	1	9	64:69	9
7.	Zürcher SC	14	3	1	10	54:78	7
8.	EHC Visp	14	0	2	12	32:100	2

== Final round ==
Pl.	Team	GP	W	T	L	GF–GA	Pts (B)
1.	HC La Chaux-de-Fonds	8	7	0	1	60:14	17(3)
2.	HC Servette Genève	8	5	0	3	45:35	12(2)
3.	HC Sierre	8	3	1	4	26:31	7(0)
4.	HC Ambrì-Piotta	8	3	0	5	24:53	6(0)
5.	EHC Kloten	8	1	1	6	20:42	4(1)

== Relegation ==
Pl.	Team	GP	W	T	L	GF–GA	Pts (B)
1.	SC Langnau	8	5	1	2	43:39	11(2)
2.	EHC Visp	8	4	2	2	38:32	10(0)
3.	Zürcher SC	8	1	1	6	30:40	4(1)
