= Jeffrey Arenburg =

Canadian gunman (1956–2017)

- Born: Jeffrey Robert Arenburg; December 30, 1956; Upper Northfield, Nova Scotia, Canada
- Died: June 13, 2017 (aged 60); Ottawa, Ontario, Canada
- Occupation: Scallop fisherman

Jeffrey Robert Arenburg (December 30, 1956 – June 13, 2017) was a Canadian man who shot and killed sportscaster and ex-National Hockey League player Brian Smith in Ottawa, Ontario, on August 1, 1995. Arenburg, a paranoid schizophrenic, was found not criminally responsible for the crime and was discharged from a mental health facility in 2006, eleven years before his death.

== Early life ==
Jeffrey Arenburg was born on December 30, 1956, in Upper Northfield, Nova Scotia, to a farming family that raised cattle and sold produce. He dropped out of school in grade nine and later found employment as a scallop fisherman in Digby, Nova Scotia. He had reportedly been exhibiting symptoms of schizophrenia for some time but was not officially diagnosed until 1990. At some point he began to believe that his ex-wife and her family were "torturing" him by broadcasting his thoughts on radio and television.

Arenburg was hospitalized in 1990 after causing a disturbance at the courthouse in Bridgewater during which he demanded an investigation, stating to authorities that his former in-laws were stealing his thoughts and selling them to Hollywood movie studios. He also came to believe that his former in-laws and the government were importing drugs into Nova Scotia and were "out to get him" due to his efforts to expose their activities. Following this disturbance, Arenburg told doctors at the South Shore Regional Hospital about the broadcasts and made threats to either burn down his in-laws' house or kill someone if the broadcasts of his thoughts were allowed to continue. He then demanded to be discharged and his request was granted, despite the threats he had made.

In January 1992, Arenburg physically assaulted the manager of a Bridgewater radio station, citing messages being broadcast in his head. He was found guilty of assault and fined C$300 or two weeks in jail in the earlier incident, but never showed up for his trial. Arenburg had already skipped town and moved to Ottawa; the authorities in Bridgewater decided that it was not worth their while to track him down.

== Ottawa shooting ==
On August 1, 1995, Arenburg went to the studio of CJOH-TV, the CTV television station in Ottawa. Witnesses said he parked his car approximately sixty metres from the front entrance of the studio, pulled a long-barreled .22-calibre rifle from his trunk and fired two shots, one hitting and killing CJOH's longtime sports anchor, Brian Smith. Arenburg had gone to the studio because he believed the station was broadcasting messages in his head. Smith was the first broadcast personality that he saw and recognized coming out of the building.

Following the shooting, police recovered a list of other Ottawa media personalities in Arenburg's apartment, and an official at the city's press club noted that he had previously ejected Arenburg from the club three times for loudly demanding to see various people on his list. Arenburg had also reportedly been turned away from the Parliament Buildings on several occasions.

Arenburg was found not criminally responsible in Smith's death due to his mental condition. He was remanded to the Oak Ridge Division of Mental Health Centre Penetanguishene. Smith's murder led to renewed calls in Canada for strengthening of the government's gun control legislation.

In 2001, the Ontario Review Board began to grant Arenburg 72-hour release. He applied for full conditional release in 2004. The Ontario Review Board granted Arenburg an absolute discharge from the Mental Health Centre Penetanguishene in November 2006. According to radio station CFRA, the board heard that he no longer posed a significant risk to the community and no longer suffers from the symptoms of paranoid schizophrenia.

== Post-release ==
On November 29, 2007, Arenburg was arrested after punching a U.S. customs officer in the head in Buffalo, New York, at the Peace Bridge International Crossing. According to officials, Arenburg attempted to enter the United States on a commercial bus as a passenger and was denied entry due to past criminal convictions. He was subsequently jailed for two years and was released on September 8, 2009. In a submission to the Ontario Review Board, a doctor said Arenburg had good insight into his illness but "would likely suffer from psychotic symptoms if he stops taking his medication."

As of early 2014, Arenburg had moved back to Bridgewater, Nova Scotia. There he claimed in an interview on the CBC program The Fifth Estate that he was no longer mentally ill and admitted he did not take the medication prescribed to keep his schizophrenia under control. In November 2014, Arenburg returned to Ottawa, stating he had been run out of Bridgewater after the CBC interview aired. Upon arriving in Ottawa he was staying in a shelter with C$15 to his name awaiting his Canada Pension Plan disability cheque.

== Death ==
On June 26, 2017, it was reported that Arenburg had died in Ottawa on June 13 of a heart attack.
