= Java Moose =

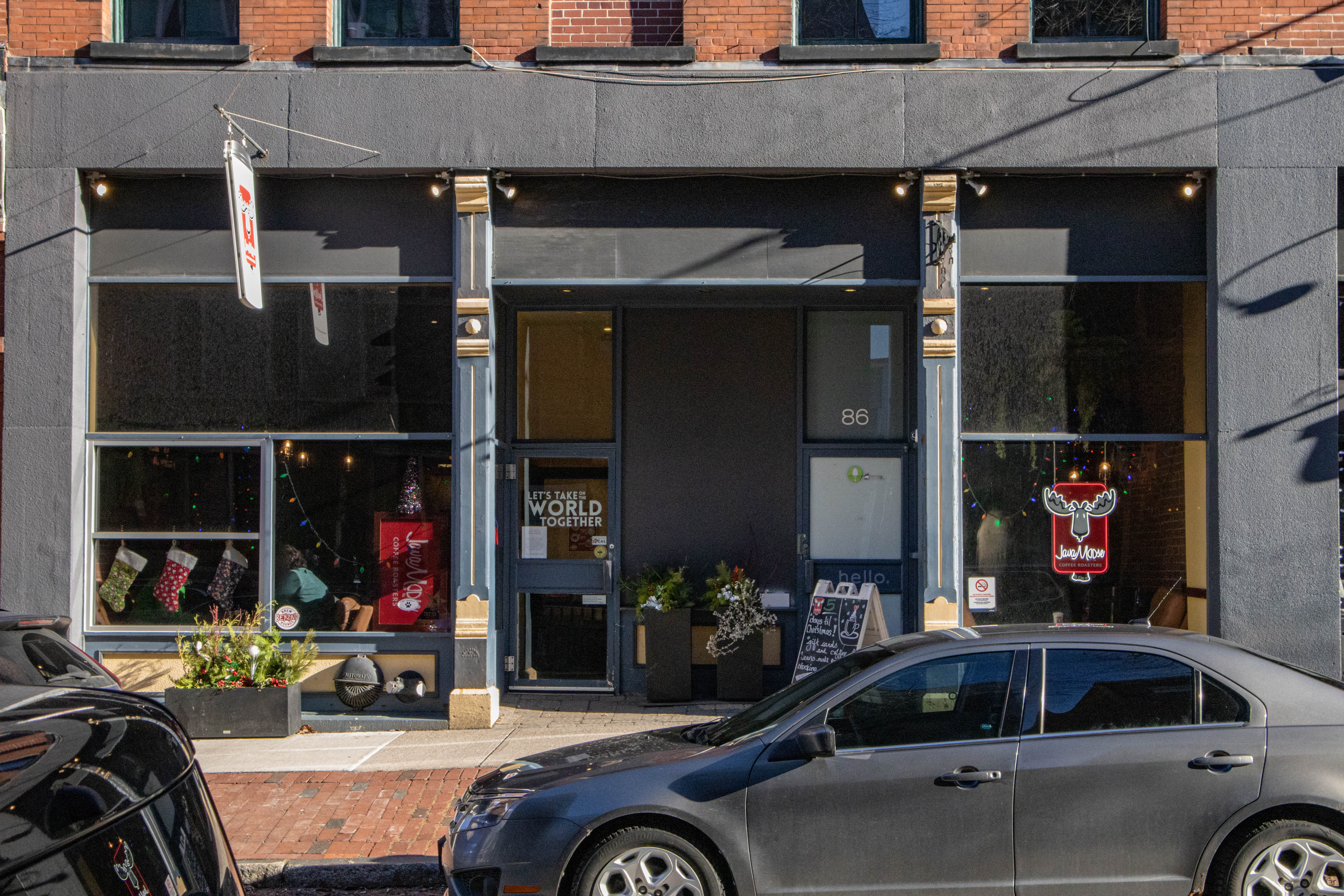
- Java Moose's Uptown location on 84 Prince William Street
- Interactive map of Java Moose

Restaurant information
- Established: 1995
- Owners: Glen McLean; Randy Pedersen (d. 2023)
- Location: 84 Prince William Street, Saint John (Main location), Saint John, Rothesay, New Brunswick, Canada
- Coordinates: 45.2719723°N 66.0619405°W
- Website: javamoose.com

Java Moose is a series of coffee shops with four locations based in Saint John and Rothesay in the Canadian province of New Brunswick. Java Moose was established in 1995 by partners Glen McLean and Randy Pedersen, with their first location being opened in 1996 at the McAllister Place. Additionally, they have a kiosk located at St. Thomas University. The coffee shop chain also distributes coffee for 250 establishments.

== History ==
Java Moose was established in 1995. In 2000, Java Moose was honored by the Saint John Board of Trade as being one of the best local businesses of the year.

In January 2015, Java Moose partnered with Coccamp, a Brazilian coffee bean company.
