= Morning in the Burned House =

Book of poetry by Margaret Atwood

First edition

Morning in the Burned House is a book of poetry by Canadian author Margaret Atwood published by McClelland and Stewart in 1995.

The book expresses themes, interests, and styles characteristic of Atwood’s poetry. These include attention to the landscape of the Canadian Shield, an air of foreboding, and poems addressed to an unspecified "you."

However, the collection also explores two distinct concerns. The first is torture, in particular the torture of women, which Atwood confronts through the retelling of myths such as those of Cressida, Helen of Troy, and Sekhmet, the Egyptian lion-headed goddess of war. Second, Atwood focuses a sequence of poems on aging and mortality by depicting and responding to her father's slow death from cancer.

== Reception ==
Morning in the Burned House was the co-winner of the 1995 Trillium Book Award in the English-language division.
