= Steve Goldman =

Canadian football coach

Biographical details
- Born: February 8, 1945 (age 81); Brooklyn, New York, U.S.

Playing career
- 1963–1965: Colorado State
- Position: Tight end

Coaching career (HC unless noted)
- 1966–1967: Florida State (GA)
- 1968–1970: Clearwater High School (OB and WR)
- 1971: Rice (Freshmen)
- 1972–1973: Rice (OB)
- 1974: Rice (OC)
- 1975-1979: Louisville (OC)
- 1980–1981: Toronto Argonauts (OB)
- 1982–1983: Hamilton Tiger-Cats (OB)
- 1984–1987: Edmonton Eskimos (OB)
- 1988: Saskatchewan Roughriders (OC)
- 1989–1991: Ottawa Rough Riders
- 1992: Nevada Aces
- 1993–1997: Temple (AHC/QB)

Head coaching record
- Overall: 11-29 (CFL)

Accomplishments and honors

Championships
- 75th Grey Cup

Steven E. "Steve" Goldman (born 1945) is an American financial advisor and former gridiron football coach. He is a Senior Vice President and Financial Advisor with UBS. From 1989 to 1991 he was head coach of the Ottawa Rough Riders of the Canadian Football League.

== Early life ==
Goldman was born on February 8, 1945, in Brooklyn. He played Tight end for the Colorado State Rams football team.

== College coaching ==
In 1966, Goldman began his coaching career as a graduate assistant under Bill Peterson at Florida State. While there, he also earned his Master of Science degree. In 1968, he became the backs and receivers coach at Clearwater High School. At Clearwater, Goldman and head coach Earle Brown installed a pro-set offense. In 1969, Clearwater wide receiver Joel Parker was named a Parade All-American and Class 2A all-state player. In 1971, Bill Peterson became head coach of the Rice Owls football team and Goldman joined him as an assistant. After one season as freshman coach, Goldman joined the varsity team as offensive backfield coach. In 1974, he became the Owls' offensive coordinator. In 1975, Goldman was hired by Louisville Cardinals Vince Gibson. Gibson wanted to run a pass-heavy offense and respected Goldman's knowledge of the passing game.

== Canadian Football League ==
In 1980, Goldman moved to the Canadian Football League. He was the offensive backfield coach for the Toronto Argonauts from 1980 to 1981, Hamilton Tiger-Cats from 1982 to 1983, Edmonton Eskimos from 1984 to 1987, and offensive coordinator for the Saskatchewan Roughriders in 1988.

Goldman was head coach and director of football operations of the Ottawa Rough Riders from 1989 to 1991. He had an overall record of 11-29 and made the playoffs in 1990 (a 34-25 East Division Semifinal loss to Toronto). He was fired after an 0–4 beginning to the 1991 season and was replaced by Joe Faragalli. During his 13 years in the CFL, Goldman coached many successful quarterbacks, including Condredge Holloway, Tom Clements, Dieter Brock, Matt Dunigan, Damon Allen, and Tom Burgess.

== Post-CFL coaching career ==
Goldman was hired to coach the Nevada Aces of the Professional Spring Football League in 1992, but the league folded before play began. In December 1992 he became the assistant head coach and quarterbacks coach at Temple.

== Financial advisor ==
Goldman retired from coaching in 1997 and began a second career as a financial advisor at Morgan Stanley legacy Smith Barney. In August 2016, Goldman became a senior vice president at UBS Financial Services.
