= Hersh Wolch =

Canadian lawyer (1940–2017)

Hersh Wolch (April 18, 1940 – July 17, 2017) was a prominent Canadian lawyer, born in Winnipeg, Manitoba.

Wolch's primary practice was in the area of criminal law where he conducted precedent-setting criminal litigation at all levels of court. He was featured in the inaugural issue of The Best Lawyers in Canada. He was selected to be a Fellow of the American College of Trial Lawyers and was a member of the International Society of Barristers. Wolch was a past president of the Manitoba Trial Lawyers’ Association and was Director of Education for the Law Society of Manitoba.

His clients included politicians, celebrities, musicians, professional athletes, police, lawyers, and judges. Wolch was formerly of the firm Wolch, Pinx, Tapper, Scurfield in Winnipeg, where many now-prominent lawyers and judges began their legal careers as students. He was later based in Calgary, Alberta, at the firm of Wolch deWit Watts & Wilson. Wolch was also general counsel to Tarrabain & Company, a law firm in Edmonton, Alberta.

== Wrongful convictions ==
Wolch is best known for acting on behalf of the wrongly convicted, including: David Milgaard, Steven Truscott, Kyle Unger, Herman Kaglik, Steven Kaminski, and David Richardson.

Wolch gained high-profile attention in 1997 when his client, Milgaard, was cleared by DNA evidence after serving 23 years in prison for the murder of Gail Miller, a Saskatoon nursing aide found murdered in 1969.

He represented Milgaard in an inquiry into his wrongful conviction, which contributed to a somewhat unusual history between Wolch and the Supreme Court of Canada. He has the rare distinction of having called evidence before the Supreme Court while conducting the Milgaard Inquiry. As a rule, only trial level courts hear evidence, and only three times has there been evidence called in the Supreme Court—each concerning possible wrongful convictions. The first two lost: first was Wilbert Coffin, he was hanged, and then there was Truscott who also lost—long before his innocence was recognized. In Milgaard, Wolch achieved the only successful review of its kind in the history of the Supreme Court. Along the way he cross-examined a serial killer and Justice of the Court of Appeal, also rarities in the Supreme Court, as well as lawyers and police. The inquiry lasted 21 days and ultimately reshaped how the legal system in Canada operates in terms of minimizing the risks of wrongful convictions, recognizing indicators of when those risks are present, and responding to past cases where a wrongful conviction is subsequently alleged.

When representing American volcanologist David Richardson, Wolch received additional attention by arguing that Richardson had a legal right to possess plutonium for religious reasons. Although Richardson was convicted, he avoided prison time by surrendering his radioactive materials.

Wolch is also well-recognized as an expert in compensation for the wrongly convicted. Milgaard received what remains the highest award ever ($10 million) for a wrongful conviction. At the time, Milgaard’s was also the highest compensation ever awarded, globally, for a wrongful conviction. Truscott received $6.5 million. Kaminski and Kaglik have been reported to have received $2.2 million and $1.1 million respectively.

== Hostage negotiations ==
In January 1978, he was called in as a hostage negotiator, when a British Columbian gunman, Bruce Archer, took three hostages in a doctor's office after killing an RCMP officer in a motel shoot-out where he shot three police officers in a small rural village of around 300 inhabitants. Archer and his accomplice both surrendered.

In 1982, two guards at Stony Mountain Penitentiary in Manitoba were taken hostage by multiple prisoners, including three convicted killers. The incident lasted approximately 39 hours. Wolch successfully negotiated the safe release of the hostages from inside the prison.

== Aboriginal justice inquiries ==
Wolch represented the Assembly of First Nations at the Manitoba Aboriginal Justice Inquiry, investigating concerns that racism and social factors were prejudicing Aboriginals within the justice system, particularly in response to public outrage following the death of aboriginal leader J.J. Harper at the hands of police, and the flawed investigation into the murder of Helen Betty Osborne at the hands of white teenagers.

He again represented the Assembly of First Nations at the Alberta Jacobs Inquiry, following cries of racism when veteran RCMP officer D. Voller shot and killed Connie Jacobs, a mother standing beside her children, also consequently killing her 9-year-old son.

== Sample of cases ==
Other notable cases include:

- 1971 – Appeared in the Supreme Court on behalf of the Crown in the matter of Ruth Thelma Piche. The major issues involved the right to silence, the voluntariness of inculpatory statements, and the admissibility of inconsistencies between exculpatory statements given at different times. Piche, pre-Charter and prior to the landmark of R v Lavallee, is an early burning bed case.
- 1988 – Represented Judge Trudel, a provincial court judge in Manitoba, from the charge of obstructing justice. A plea bargain was struck wherein Judge Trudel resigned. Trudel received his pension and retirement benefits.
- 1988 – Appeared for Barry Neilson, a former police officer charged with murder.
- 2001 – Represented Kenneth Szczerba, a member of the Hells Angels, who was accused and found guilty of plotting to bomb the house of a local Alderman and set fire to another in an attempt to intimidate them.
- 2003 – Defending Gurcharn Sidhu against claims that he bribed an Edmonton Workers' Compensation Board case manager to award him large settlements.
- 2004 – Representing Cpl. Tereposky of the RCMP in an investigation into $275,000 paid to a drug informant for the arrest of two heroin dealers in Calgary.
- 2004 – Acting as lawyer for Kyle Unger's appeal after the hair-comparison evidence used in his trial was found unreliable. Unger was convicted of the 1990 sexual mutilation and beating death of a 16-year Brigitte Grenier at an outdoor rock concert.
- 2007 – Wolch agreed to serve as appellate counsel for convicted Edmonton murderers Michael White and George Allen.
- 2009 – Theoren Fleury retained Wolch as counsel in regards to his complaint against Graham James, his former hockey coach and a convicted sex offender. It is unusual for a victim of a crime to retain private counsel in Canada as it is the role of the Attorney General to handle prosecutions. Fleury was oft quoted for his statement: "I’ve hired Hersh Wolch, who might be the best criminal attorney in North America."
- 2011 – Wolch appeared before the Supreme Court on behalf of Ross Barros. Barros was a former police officer turned private investigator charged with obstructing justice and extortion. The charges came after Barros, hired by an accused to investigate a case, allegedly discovered the identity of a police informer or agent. No ruling has been reached as of the date this entry is made.

== Other points of interest ==
Wolch holds the rank of Life Master Bridge Player, the highest recognition of achievement for bridge players. Wolch has won Provincial Tennis Tournament. Wolch has scored a Hole in One in golf. He has represented Canada at international Contract Bridge tournaments, won multiple prizes, and once played against Omar Sharif.

In 2001, Wolch was one of the major shareholders to loan Maple Leaf Distillers 3.1 million to help it expand and meet an agreement with Pernod Ricard, the third-largest wine distributor in the world. Wolch was a director of Salibury House Restaurants, based in Winnipeg, Manitoba.

== Personal life ==
Mr. Wolch married Linda Nodder in 1969 and they eventually had five children together: Amanda, Eden, Glynnis, Shana and Gavin. The couple divorced in 1996. He was married to Sheilah Martin, a lawyer, professor, judge, and puisne justice of the Supreme Court of Canada from 2000 until his death in 2017.

== Death ==
On July 17, 2017, Hersh was pronounced dead at the Foothills hospital after collapsing at his Calgary home early in the morning due to a heart attack.
