= James A. McKinstry =

American professor (born 1942)

James A. McKinstry (born April 12, 1942) is a former professor at LIU Post, a tenured Special Education teacher in the New York City Department of Education and previously worked in aeronautical engineering. He was on the Taxi Squad on the New York Jets 1963 football team and was included in a Life magazine photograph of the team. He also taught physical education at St. Patrick’s school in Huntington, NY.

== Biography ==
McKinstry's athletic career started at S.U.N.Y. Farmingdale. He was honored twice as a Junior College All-American. He then signed with the Montreal Alouettes in the Canadian Football League in 1961. While playing for the Grand Rapids Blazers football team in the United Football League, McKinstry was scouted by the New York Jets as a free agent. He also had interest from other teams, such as the New York Giants. McKinstry played as a tight end with the Jets from 1963 to 1965. His time with the Jets was interrupted when he voluntarily went into the Army at the beginning of the Vietnam War.

During his time with the Jets, McKinstry worked full-time on the off season for Grumman Aerospace Corporation in Bethpage on the project management team. He coordinated activities for the Lunar Excursion Module (L.E.M.) and was appointed Night Director for the F-14 Tomcat production. McKinstry worked on the proposal plan for the X-29, which was placed in the Smithsonian Air and Space Museum.

While working nights at Grumman, he obtained a Bachelor of Science degree in health and physical education at LIU Post in 1976, graduating with the designation of cum laude. After completing a Masters of Science degree in education, with New York State certifications in special education and adapted physical education at LIU Post in 1978, he was appointed to a faculty position in Health, Physical Education, and Recreation.

Expanding on his graduate thesis in speed development, McKinstry launched his own business, Nu Tek Athletic Consulting Ltd, in 1986. Nu Tek Athletic Consulting Ltd specialized in speed training for professional, college, and high school athletes. McKinstry lectured at various institutions such as LIU Post, Yale, and the Joe Namath Football Camp.

In 1994, with the merger of Northrop Corporation and Grumman Corporation, McKinstry began working for the New York City Department of Education. During his four years he taught SIE VII special education students, earning a tenured teacher appointment.

McKinstry worked at St. John's University as an administrator from 1998 to 2014.

McKinstry now volunteers at various organizations, such as the Intrepid Sea, Air & Space Museum, teaching young children about the benefits of education while pursuing their interest in sports. He also supports head injury awareness, speaking at the Head Injury Association Sports Forum.

== Children ==
His son, also called James, was a scholarship tennis player at St. John's University as well as walk on football player. His daughter Kelly was a scholarship basketball player at Molloy College and his other daughter, Erin, was a scholarship tennis player at Fordham University.

== Athletic highlights ==
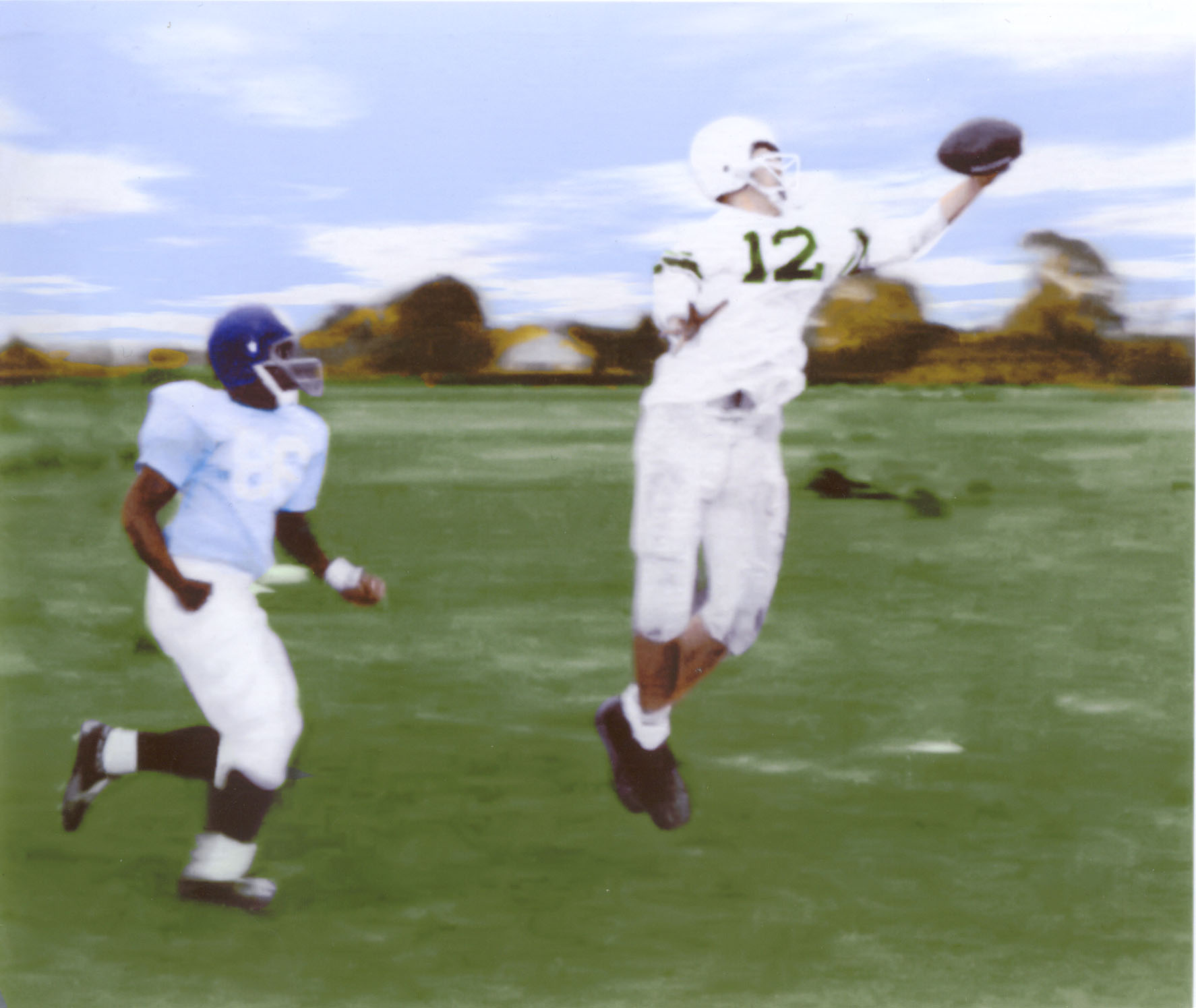
McKinstry making a touchdown in 1961

- Two-year junior college All-American in football - Farmingdale State College (1960–1962)
- Full academic undergraduate scholarship to LIU Post (1970–1976)
- Featured in Life magazine pullout with the New York Jets (October 25, 1963)
- Joe Namath Football Camp lecturer on speed development
- Industrial League Basketball Coach of the Year (1979 and 1980)
- Sports Hall of Fame - Farmingdale State College (1995)
